= Abidjan =

Largest city and district of Ivory Coast

- City and autonomous district
- Autonomous District of Abidjan; District Autonome d'Abidjan (French)
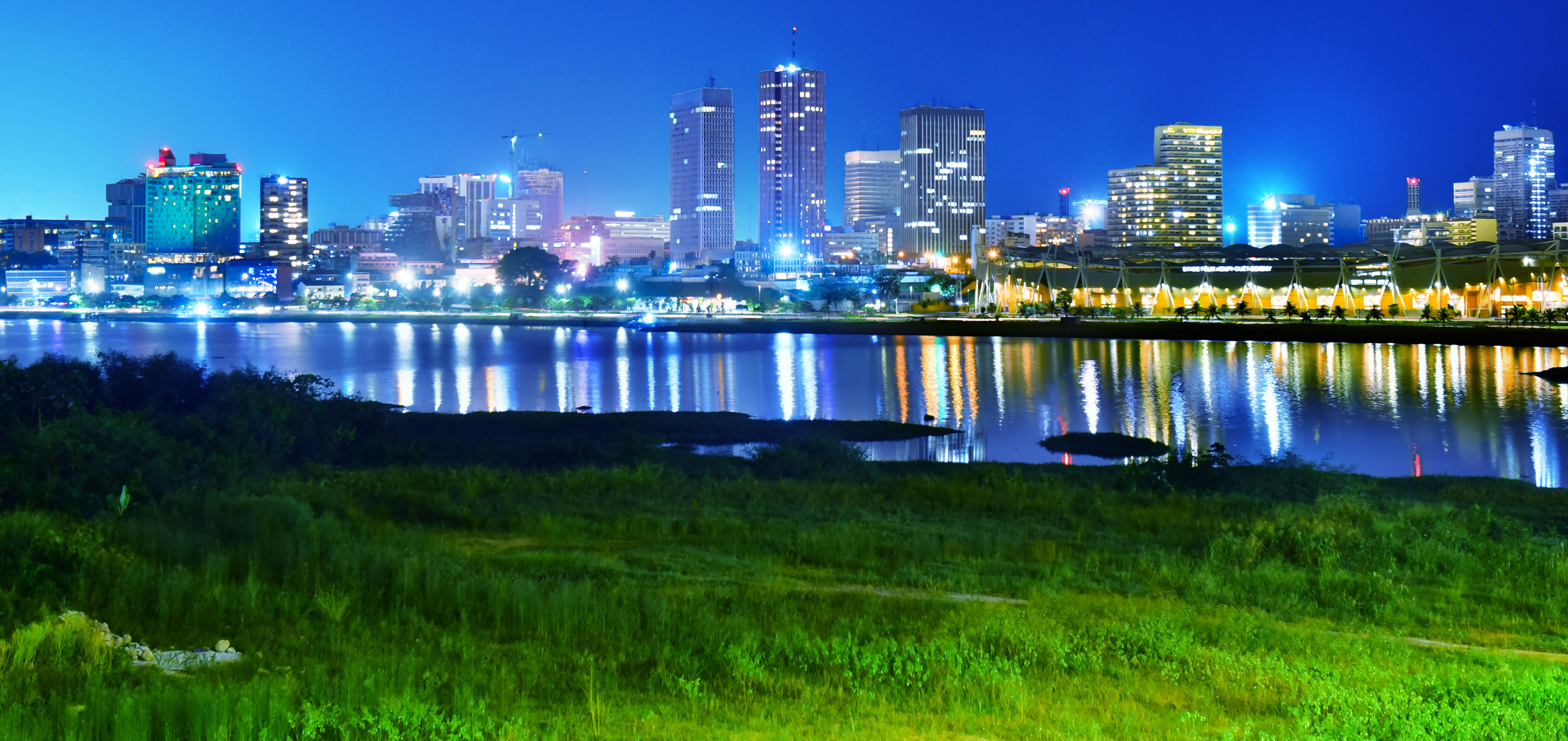
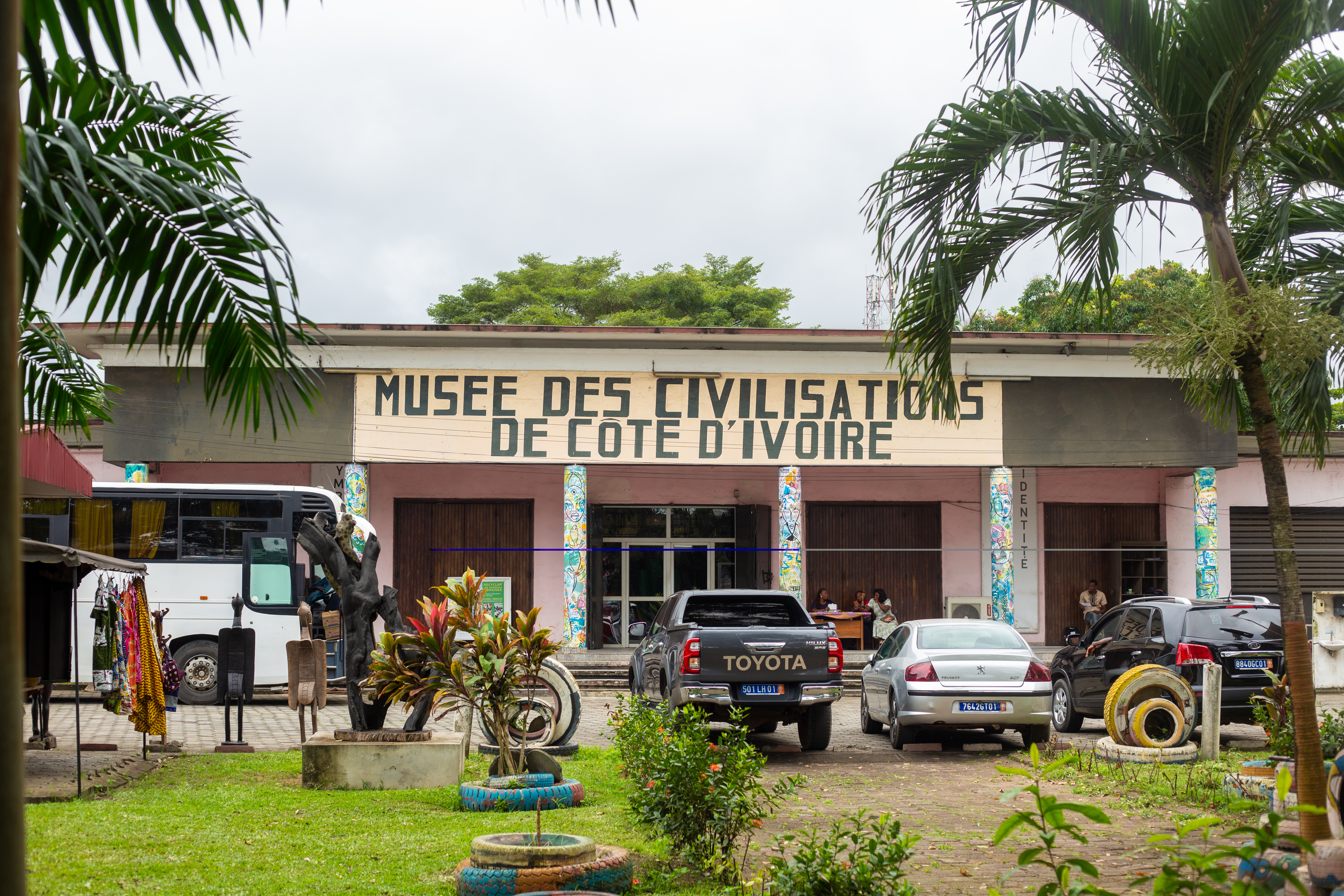
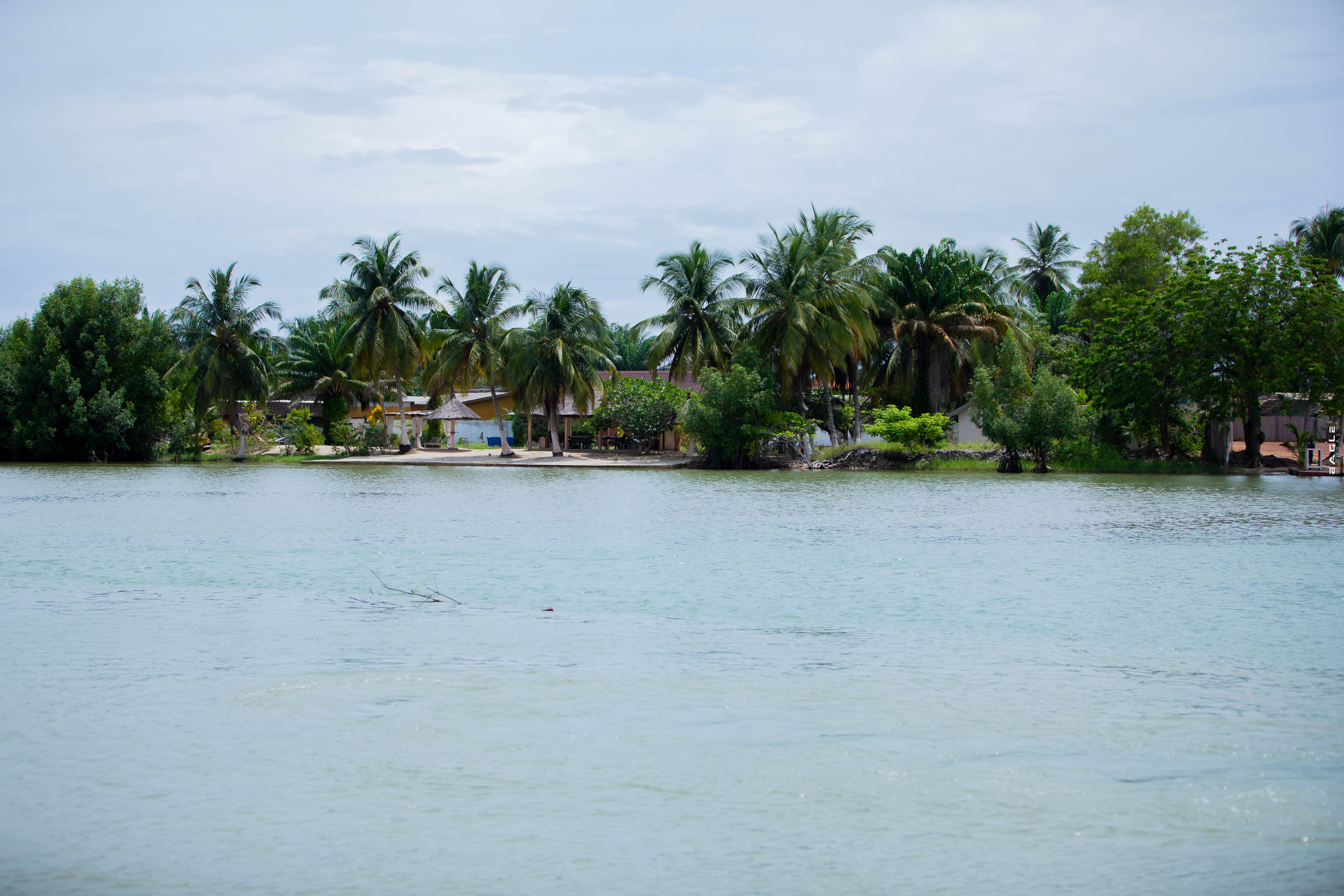
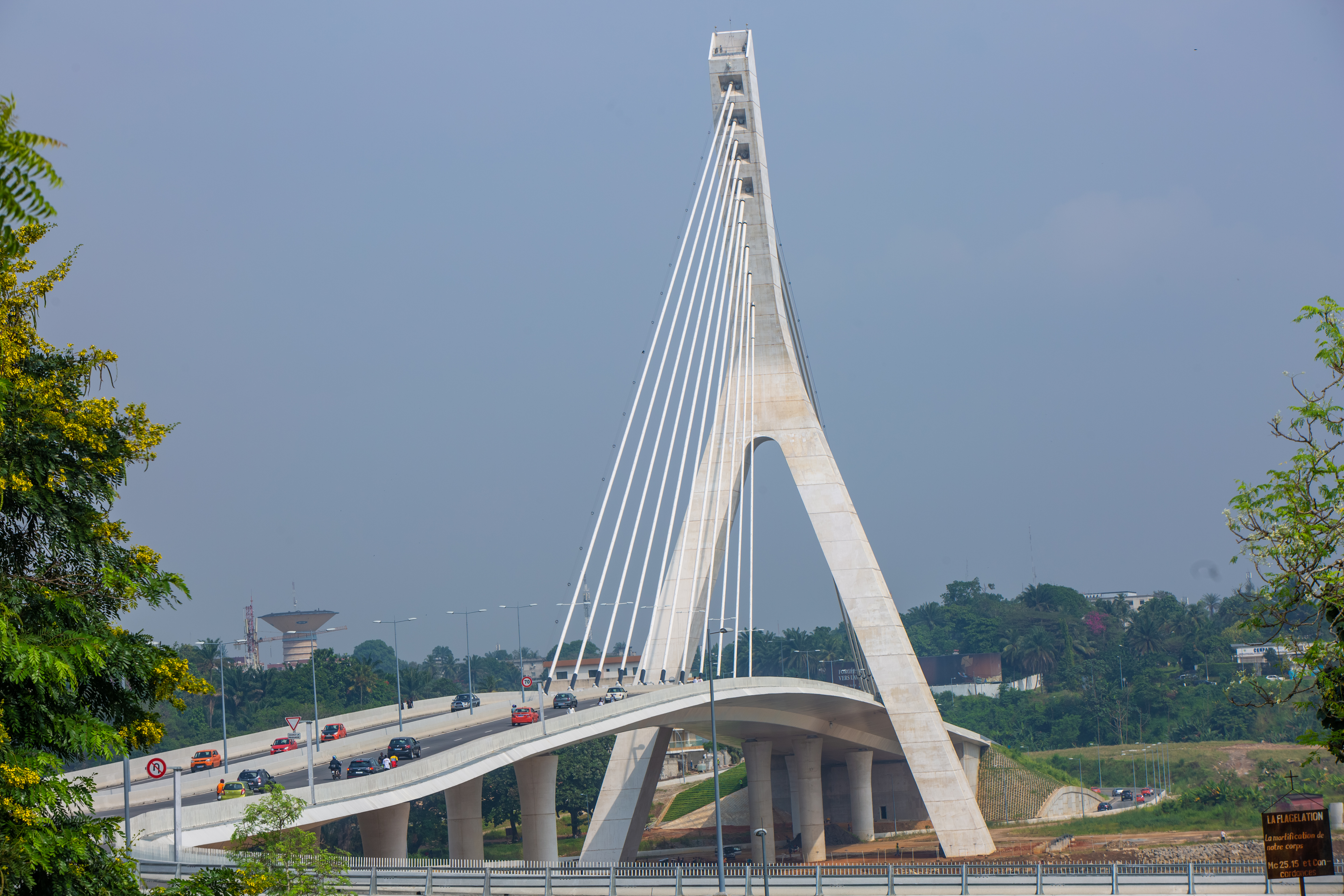
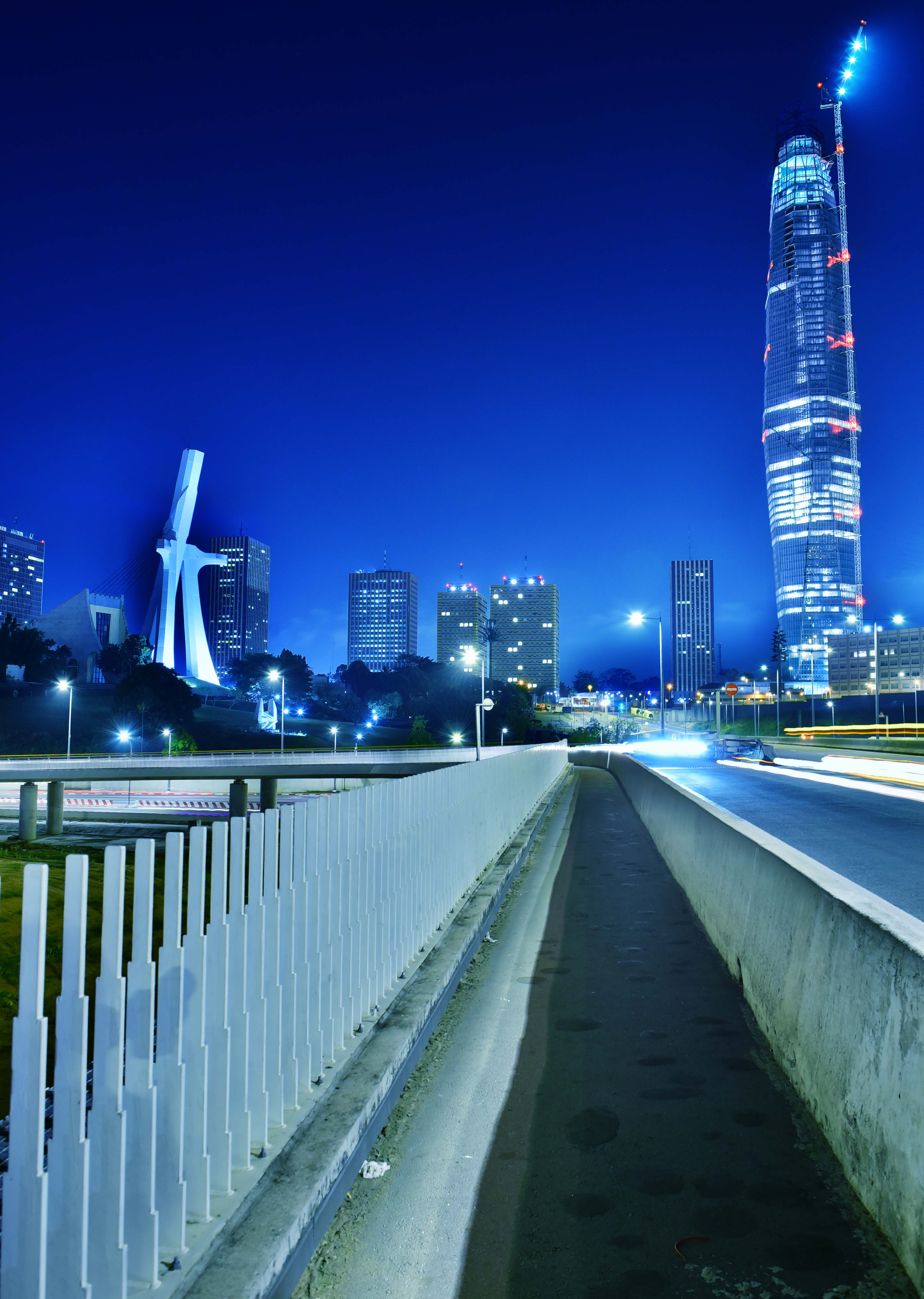
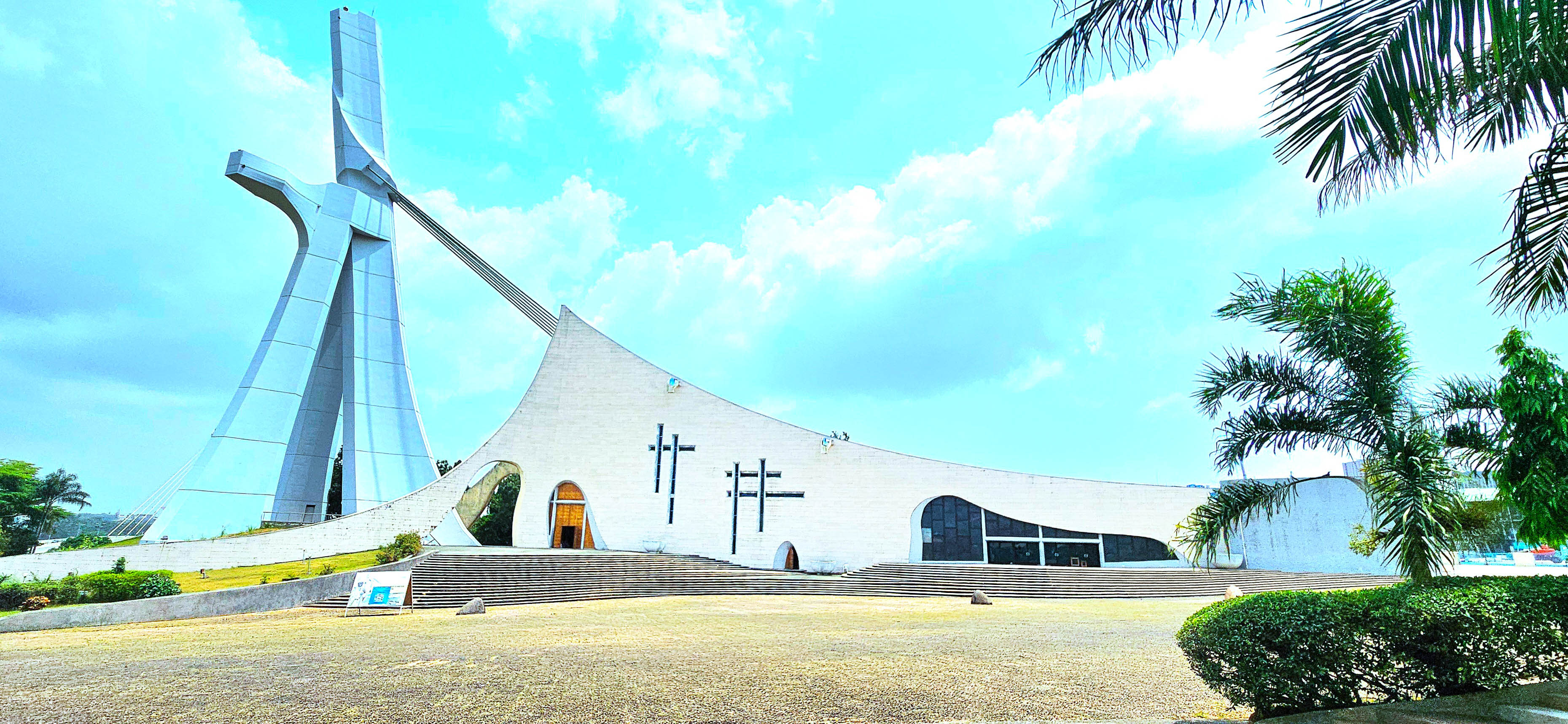
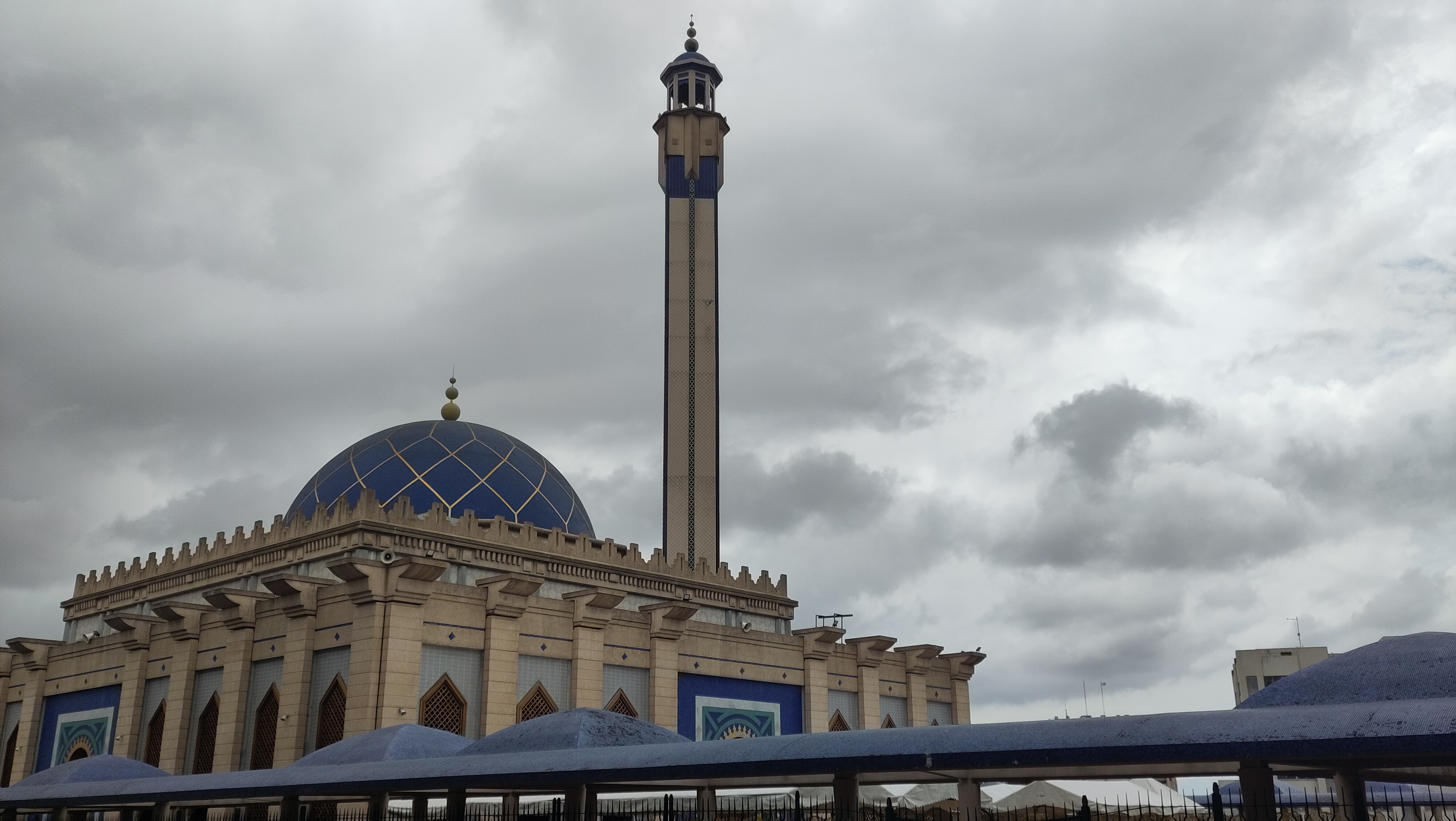
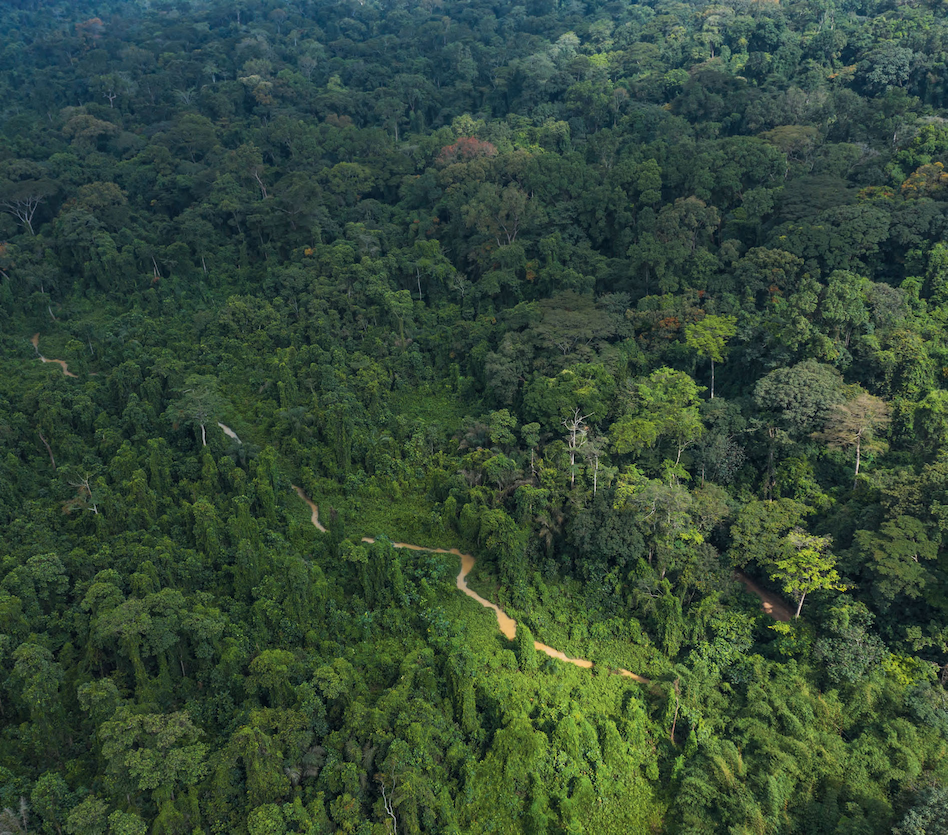
- Skyline of Le Plateau Musée des Civilisations de Côte d'Ivoire Ébrié Lagoon A. Ouattara Bridge Cité Administrative St. Paul's Cathedral Abidjan Great Mosque Banco National Park Felix Houphouet Boigny Stadium

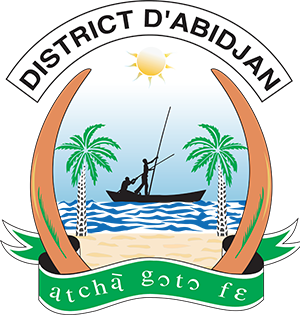
- Logo
- Nickname: "Babi"
- Motto: "District d'Abidjan, acteur de développement"
- Map of the 10 communes which formed the former City of Abidjan (422 km^{2}), within the larger Autonomous District of Abidjan (2119 km^{2})

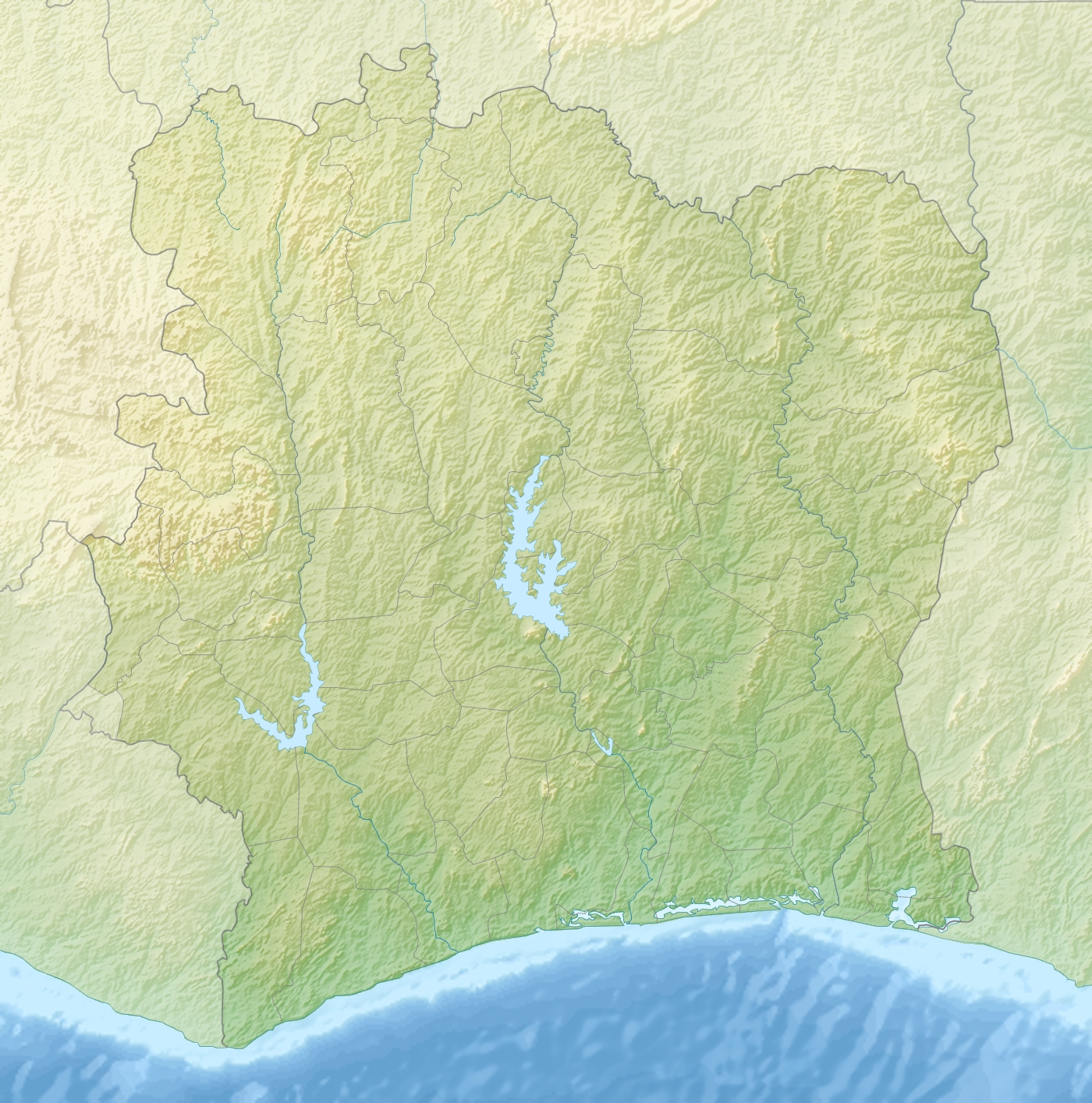
- Location in Cote d'Ivoire Abidjan (Africa)
- Coordinates: 5°19′N 4°2′W
- Country: Ivory Coast
- District: Abidjan
- Department: Abidjan
- Founded: 1898

Government
  - Governor: Ibrahim Bacongo Cissé

Area
  - Total: 2,119 km^{2} (818 sq mi)
  - City: 422 km^{2} (163 sq mi)
- Elevation: 18 m (59 ft)

Population (14 Dec. 2021 census)
  - Total: 6,321,017
  - Rank: 1st
  - Density: 2,983/km^{2} (7,726/sq mi)
  - City: 5,616,633
  - City density: 13,300/km^{2} (34,500/sq mi)
- Demonym: Abidjanais

Human Development Index
  - HDI (2022): 0.569 (medium)
- Time zone: UTC+0 (GMT)
- Official language: French
- Climate: Tropical savanna climate (Aw)
- Website: abidjan.district.ci (in French)

Abidjan (/ˌæbɪˈdʒɑːn/ AB-ih-JAHN, French: [abidʒɑ̃]; N'ko: ߊߓߌߖߊ߲߬) is the seat of government, largest city and former capital of Ivory Coast. As of the 2021 census, Abidjan's population was 6.3 million, which is 21.5 percent of the overall population of the country, making it the sixth most populous city proper in Africa, after Lagos, Cairo, Kinshasa, Dar es Salaam, and Johannesburg. A cultural crossroads of West Africa, Abidjan is characterised by a high level of industrialisation and urbanisation. It is the most populous French-speaking city in West Africa.

The city expanded quickly after the construction of a new wharf in 1931, followed by its designation as the capital city of the then-French colony in 1933. The completion of the Vridi Canal in 1951 enabled Abidjan to become an important sea port. Abidjan remained the capital of Ivory Coast after its independence from France in 1960. In 1983, the city of Yamoussoukro was designated as the official political capital of Ivory Coast. However, Abidjan has officially been designated as the "economic capital" of the country, because it is the largest city in the country and the centre of its economic activity. Many political institutions and all foreign embassies continue to be located in Abidjan as well. The Abidjan Autonomous District, which encompasses the city and some of its suburbs, is one of the 14 districts of Ivory Coast.

== Etymology ==
According to oral tradition of the Tchaman as reported in the Encyclopedic Dictionary of Côte d'Ivoire, the name "Abidjan" results from a misunderstanding. Legend states that an old man carrying branches to repair the roof of his house met a European explorer who asked him the name of the nearest village. The old man did not speak the language of the explorer, and thought that he was being asked to justify his presence in that place. Terrified by this unexpected meeting, he fled shouting "min-chan m'bidjan", which means in the Ebrié language: "I just cut the leaves." The explorer, thinking that his question had been answered, recorded the name of the locale as Abidjan.

A slightly different and less elaborate version of the legend: When the first colonists asked a native man the name of the place, the man misunderstood and replied "M'bi min djan": "I've just been cutting leaves".

== History ==
=== Colonial era ===
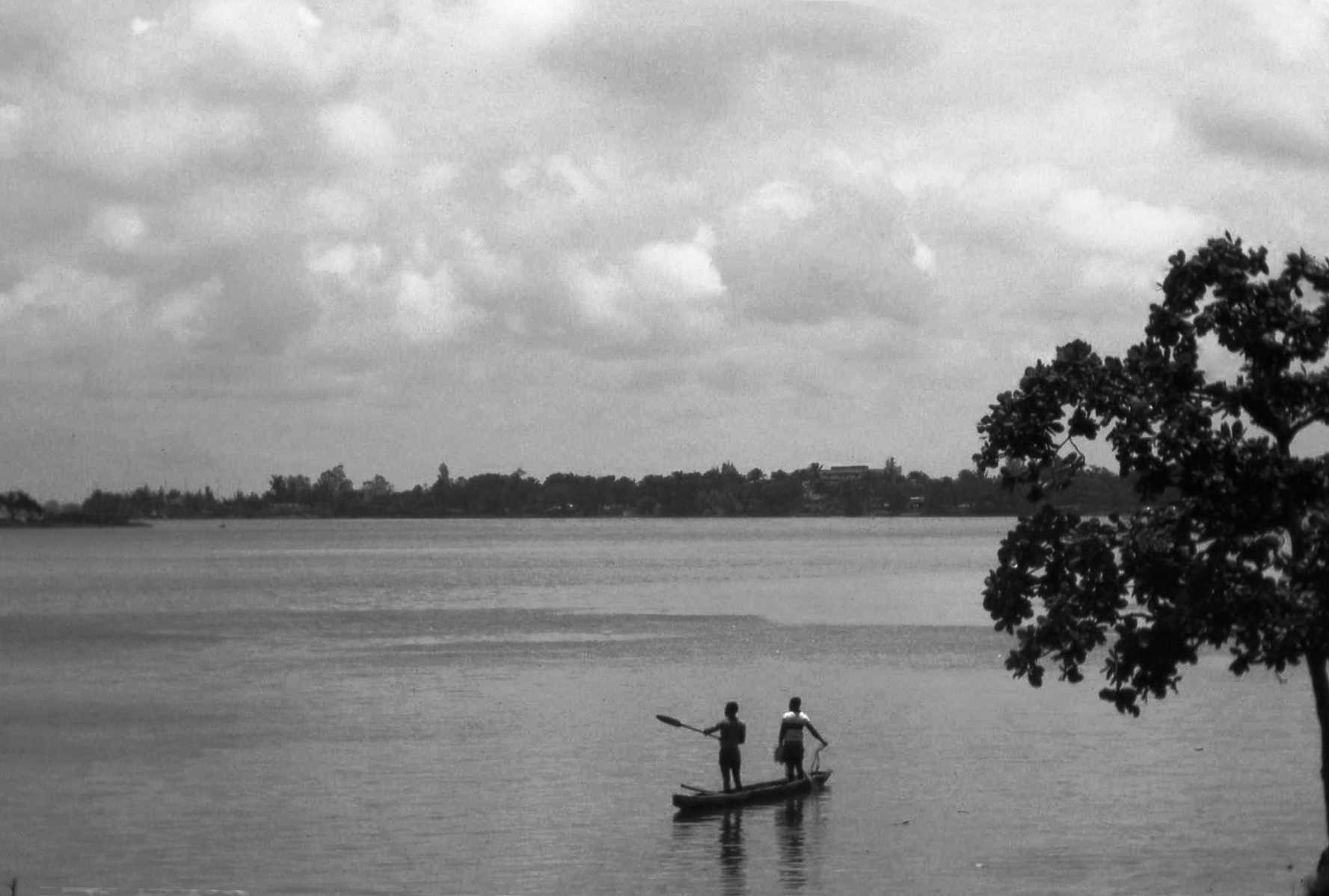
Abidjan boatmen.

Abidjan was originally a small Atchan fishing village. In 1896, following a series of deadly yellow fever epidemics, French colonists who had initially settled in Grand-Bassam decided to move to a safer place and in 1898 chose the current location of Abidjan. In 1903 it officially became a town. The settlers were followed by the colonial government, created in 1899. But then nearby Bingerville became the capital of the French colony, from 1900 until 1934.

The future Abidjan, situated on the edge of the lagoon n'doupé ("the lagoon in hot water"), offered more land and greater opportunities for trade expansion. The wharf in Petit Bassam (now Port-Bouët) south of town quickly overtook the wharf of Grand-Bassam in importance, and became the main point of economic access to the colony. In 1904, the rail terminus was located in the Port-Bouët area of Abidjan. Starting in 1904, when Bingerville was not yet complete, Abidjan became the main economic hub of the colony of Ivory Coast and a prime channel for distributing products to the European hinterland, particularly through the Lebanese community, which was increasing in importance.

Henri de Fougères became governor of French Sudan in 1924, and remained governor until his death in 1931. One of the main streets of Abidjan still bears his name.

In 1931, Plateau and what would become Treichville were connected by a floating bridge, more or less where the Houphouët-Boigny Bridge stands today. The year 1931 also saw addresses begin to be assigned to the streets of Abidjan for the first time. The addressing project was temporarily concluded in 1964, under the leadership of Mayor Konan Kanga, then badly redone American-style in 1993.

Abidjan became the third capital of Ivory Coast by a 1934 decree, following Grand-Bassam and Bingerville. The decision to designate Abidjan as the capital spurred from its railroad that would connect the North and South regions of the Ivorian colony. Several villages in Tchaman were then deserted. The leader of the Tchaman community can still be found in Adjame ("center" or "meeting" in Tchaman), north of the Plateau.

South of the Plateau district (the current central district of the city of Abidjan), the village of Dugbeo was moved across the lagoon to Anoumabo, "the forest of fruit bats", which became the neighborhood of Treichville (now known as Commikro, city of clerks). Treichville was renamed in 1934, in honour of Marcel Treich-Laplène (1860–1890), the first explorer of the Ivory Coast and its first colonial administrator, considered its founder. Instead of Dugbeyo, is the current Treich-Laplénie Avenue, the bus station and water lagoon buses in Plateau, and the Avenue Charles de Gaulle (commonly called Rue du Commerce).

The city was laid out like most colonial towns, on a grid plan. Le Plateau ("m'brato" in Tchaman) were inhabited by settlers. In the north, the city was inhabited by the colonized. The two zones were separated by the Gallieni Military Barracks, where now there is the current courthouse. City spaces were often segregated between French colonists and Ivorian natives.

Near the port, originally named Boulevard de Marseille, settlers became defensive and stole a street sign of a famous street of Marseille renamed the street Canebière, a sand track. This is the legend behind the first Blohorn oil mills, in Cocody and a racetrack was built in the south of the city.

In Le Plateau in the 1940s, the Bardon Park Hotel was built, the first air-conditioned hotel working in francophone Africa.

Under the Pacte Colonial (Colonial Pact), Abidjan served as a port city that would connect the colonial hinterlands that produced raw materials to the industrial centers of France. The construction of the 15m-deep Vridi Canal in 1950 aided in this endeavor by connecting the Ebrié Lagoon to the sea. By the late 1950s, Abidjan became the financial center of West Africa, challenging the dominance of Dakar. In 1958, the first bridge to connect Petit-Bassam Island with the mainland was completed.

During World War II, France's Vichy government completed construction of the Port in Abidjan to counter British influence. After the war, France competed with other harbors in the Gulf of Guinea, and due to increased foreign interest in the capital city, placed protectionist policies on imports, foreign consulates, and U.S. building contracts. The Abidjan city council elections of 1945 sparked the beginnings of the nationalist movement that challenged France's authority.

=== After independence ===
When Ivory Coast became independent in 1960, Abidjan became the new country's administrative and economic center. The axis south of Treichville, towards the international airport and the beaches, became the heart of European and middle-class Abidjan. The city saw considerable population growth in the decades following independence, expanding from 180,000 inhabitants in 1960 to 1,269,000 in 1978. Abidjan's skyline dates back to the economic prosperity of this period.

New districts such as the upmarket Cocody were founded during this period; built to a large extent in a colonial style, Cocody has since become home to Ivory Coast's wealthy classes as well as expatriates and foreign diplomats. The district is home to the embassy of France, Hotel Ivoire (which for a long time, was the only African hotel to have a skating rink), and, since 2009, the largest U.S. embassy in West Africa.

Construction on St. Paul's Cathedral, designed by Italian architect Aldo Spirito, began with the 1980 groundbreaking by Pope John Paul II and was completed in 1985. From the 1980s, Abidjan's fortunes declined as a result of negligence on the part of officials as well as corruption and general degradation. In 1983, the village of Yamoussoukro became the new political capital of Ivory Coast under the leadership of President Félix Houphouët-Boigny, who was born in Yamoussoukro.

From 2002 to 2007 and especially from 2010 to 2011, Abidjan suffered from the consequences of the First and Second Ivorian Civil Wars. In November 2004, armed conflict broke out between French forces and Ivorian forces loyal to Laurent Gbagbo after the Ivorian Air Force attacked French peacekeepers in northern Ivory Coast. After France destroyed Ivory Coast's air capabilities in retaliation, pro-Gbagbo groups staged riots and looting in Abidjan and targeted French homes, schools, and businesses. French peacekeepers moved into the city to calm the situation. Other crises during the first civil war period include the case of the Probo Koala in 2006, in which disposed products caused thousands of residents to seek medical attention. Ivory Coast's civil conflicts seriously impacted the security situation in Abidjan. Amidst the anti-French riots in November 2004, 4,000 prisoners in Abidjan escaped from the country's largest prison.

Abidjan was one of the main theaters of the 2010–2011 Ivorian crisis and the site of major demonstrations against incumbent president Gbagbo, including one on International Women's Day in 2011 that saw several demonstrators killed by Gbagbo's forces. Civil postwar violence persisted in urban districts with high territorial control by Ggabo's supporters. Districts became associated with specific political attributes, which Ggabo's forces used to target residents in Abobo and Yopougon. Ethnic homogeneity in segregated neighborhoods is suggested to have enabled such territorial turmoil. The end of the crisis came with Gbagbo's capture in Abidjan in April 2011, following a major offensive by forces loyal to election winner Alassane Ouattara with support from France and the UN. Overtime, the intensity of postwar violence has decreased.

In 2025, a major overhaul of names from the colonial era will be reorganized to more African names.

== Geography ==
Location map of Abidjan

Abidjan lies on the south-east coast of the country, on the Gulf of Guinea. The city is located on the Ébrié Lagoon. The business district, Le Plateau, is the center of the city, along with Cocody, Deux Plateaux (the city's wealthiest neighborhood and a hub for diplomats), and Adjamé, a slum on the north shore of the lagoon. Treichville and Marcory lie to the south, Attecoube, Locodjro, Abobo Doume and Yopougon to the west, and Île Boulay is located in the middle of the lagoon. Further south lies Port Bouët, home to the airport and main seaport. Abidjan is located at 5°25' North, 4°2' West (5.41667, –4.03333).

=== Climate ===
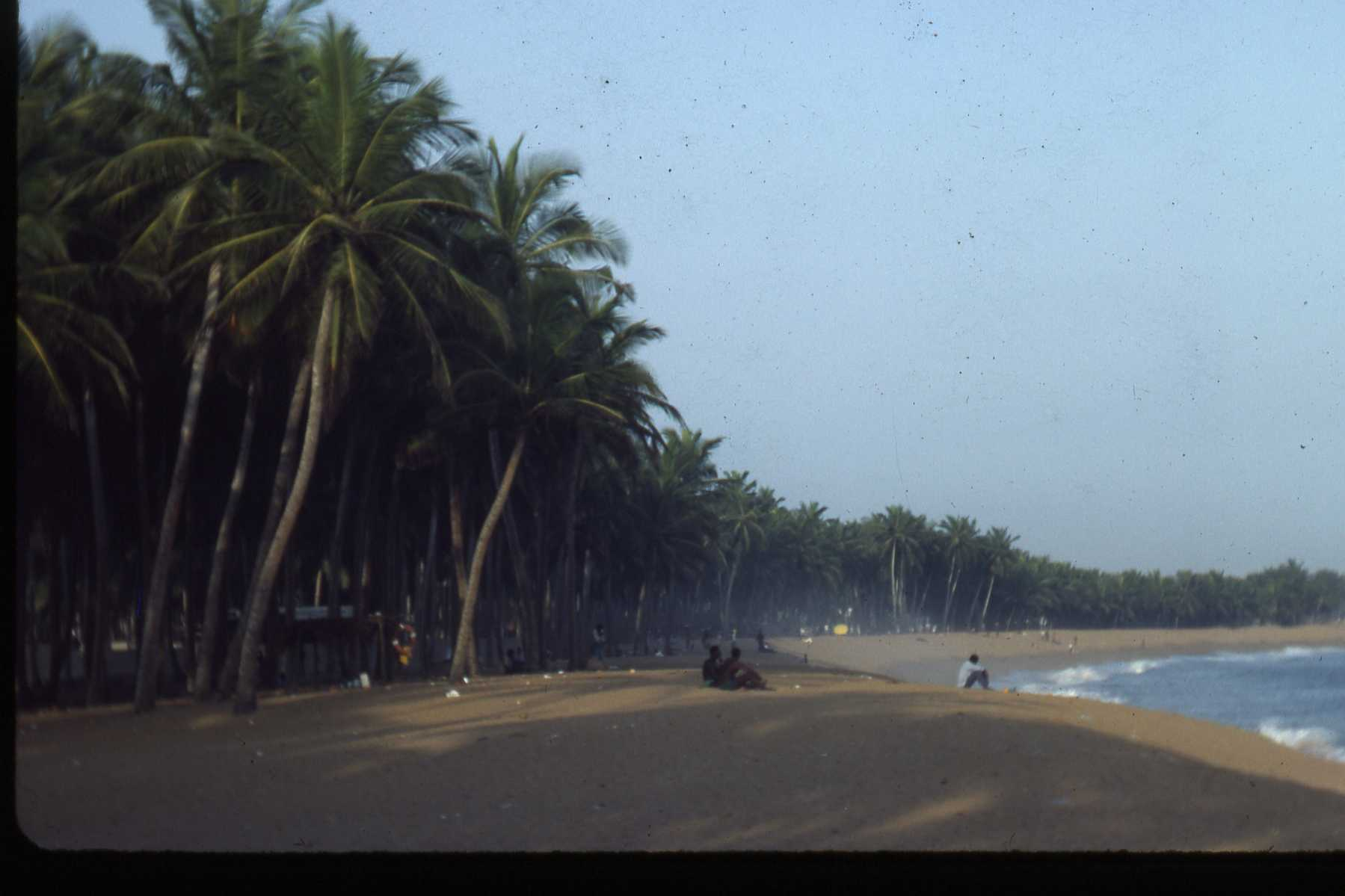
Beach of Vridi

Abidjan experiences a tropical wet and dry climate, according to the Köppen climate classification (Köppen climate classification: Aw), closely bordering a tropical monsoon climate (Am). Abidjan has nonconsecutive rainy seasons and dry seasons (precipitation above and below 60 millimetres (2.4 in) with a long rainy season from March to July, a short dry season in August, a short rainy season from September to November, and a long dry season from December to February. Precipitation is abundant during the summer months, except for August, due to activation of the Benguela Current, which reduces the precipitation total throughout the month. The Benguela Current also lowers the mean temperature during August, making it the coolest month of the year, averaging 24.5 °C (76.1 °F). Abidjan has three additional dry months (December, January, and February). Abidjan is generally humid, with average relative humidity above 80% throughout the year.

Climate data for Abidjan, Cote d'Ivoire (1991-2020) normals
Month	Jan	Feb	Mar	Apr	May	Jun	Jul	Aug	Sep	Oct	Nov	Dec	Year
Record high °C (°F)	35.0 (95.0)	35.7 (96.3)	34.9 (94.8)	35.0 (95.0)	34.9 (94.8)	36.2 (97.2)	34.0 (93.2)	32.0 (89.6)	32.1 (89.8)	32.8 (91.0)	35.0 (95.0)	33.7 (92.7)	36.2 (97.2)
Mean daily maximum °C (°F)	31.9 (89.4)	32.4 (90.3)	32.4 (90.3)	32.3 (90.1)	31.5 (88.7)	29.6 (85.3)	28.6 (83.5)	28.1 (82.6)	28.8 (83.8)	30.3 (86.5)	31.5 (88.7)	31.3 (88.3)	30.7 (87.3)
Daily mean °C (°F)	26.8 (80.2)	27.7 (81.9)	27.9 (82.2)	27.7 (81.9)	26.9 (80.4)	25.8 (78.4)	24.7 (76.5)	24.5 (76.1)	25.6 (78.1)	26.8 (80.2)	27.4 (81.3)	27.0 (80.6)	26.6 (79.9)
Mean daily minimum °C (°F)	23.5 (74.3)	24.6 (76.3)	24.9 (76.8)	24.9 (76.8)	24.6 (76.3)	23.7 (74.7)	22.9 (73.2)	22.1 (71.8)	22.3 (72.1)	23.6 (74.5)	24.4 (75.9)	23.8 (74.8)	23.8 (74.8)
Record low °C (°F)	14.7 (58.5)	16.0 (60.8)	19.0 (66.2)	15.9 (60.6)	18.5 (65.3)	18.6 (65.5)	17.1 (62.8)	17.2 (63.0)	15.2 (59.4)	17.5 (63.5)	19.5 (67.1)	16.5 (61.7)	14.7 (58.5)
Average rainfall mm (inches)	24.6 (0.97)	41.3 (1.63)	88.3 (3.48)	161.3 (6.35)	268.3 (10.56)	441.1 (17.37)	134.5 (5.30)	26.1 (1.03)	74.6 (2.94)	204.1 (8.04)	169.8 (6.69)	57.5 (2.26)	1,691.5 (66.62)
Average rainy days (≥ 1 mm)	1.9	3.2	6.6	8.5	13.2	16	7.8	4.2	5.9	11.4	12.5	5.6	96.8
Average relative humidity (%)	84	86	83	82	84	86	85	86	89	87	83	83	85
Mean monthly sunshine hours	208.8	200.9	221.3	219.7	191.8	129.8	147.4	121.9	134	194.3	233.6	217.3	2,220.8
Source 1: Deutscher Wetterdienst
Source 2: Danish Meteorological Institute

Abidjan mean sea temperature [°C (°F)]
Jan	Feb	Mar	Apr	May	Jun	Jul	Aug	Sep	Oct	Nov	Dec
28 °C (82 °F)	28 °C (82 °F)	28 °C (82 °F)	29 °C (84 °F)	29 °C (84 °F)	28 °C (82 °F)	26 °C (79 °F)	25 °C (77 °F)	25 °C (77 °F)	26 °C (79 °F)	28 °C (82 °F)	28 °C (82 °F)

==== Climate change ====
A 2019 paper published in PLOS One estimates that under Representative Concentration Pathway 4.5, a "moderate" scenario of climate change where global warming reaches ~2.5–3 °C (4.5–5.4 °F) by 2100, the climate of Abidjan in the year 2050 would most closely resemble the current climate of Manila in the Philippines. The annual temperature would increase by 1.8 °C (3.2 °F), and the temperature of the coldest month by 1.9 °C (3.4 °F), but the temperature of the warmest month would be 3.4 °C (6.1 °F) higher. According to Climate Action Tracker, the current warming trajectory appears consistent with 2.7 °C (4.9 °F), which closely matches RCP 4.5.

Moreover, according to the 2022 IPCC Sixth Assessment Report, Abidjan is one of 12 major African cities (Abidjan, Alexandria, Algiers, Cape Town, Casablanca, Dakar, Dar es Salaam, Durban, Lagos, Lomé, Luanda and Maputo) which would be the most severely affected by the future sea level rise. It estimates that they would collectively sustain cumulative damages of US$65 billion under RCP 4.5 and US$86.5 billion for the high-emission scenario RCP 8.5 by the year 2050. Additionally, RCP 8.5 combined with the hypothetical impact from marine ice sheet instability at high levels of warming would involve up to US$137.5 billion in damages, while the additional accounting for the "low-probability, high-damage events" may increase aggregate risks to US$187 billion for the "moderate" RCP4.5, US$206 billion for RCP8.5 and US$397 billion under the high-end ice sheet instability scenario. Since sea level rise would continue for about 10,000 years under every scenario of climate change, future costs of sea level rise would only increase, especially without adaptation measures.

=== Territorial divisions ===
The Autonomous District of Abidjan (District Autonome d'Abidjan), which superseded the former City of Abidjan (Ville d'Abidjan) in 2001, is made up of 10 central communes, whose territory corresponds to the former City of Abidjan, and 4 outlying sub-prefectures: Anyama, Bingerville, Brofodoumé, and Songon.

The 10 communes of the former City of Abidjan are traditionally divided into northern Abidjan and southern Abidjan, with the Ébrié Lagoon separating both halves of the city.

==== Communes of Northern Abidjan ====
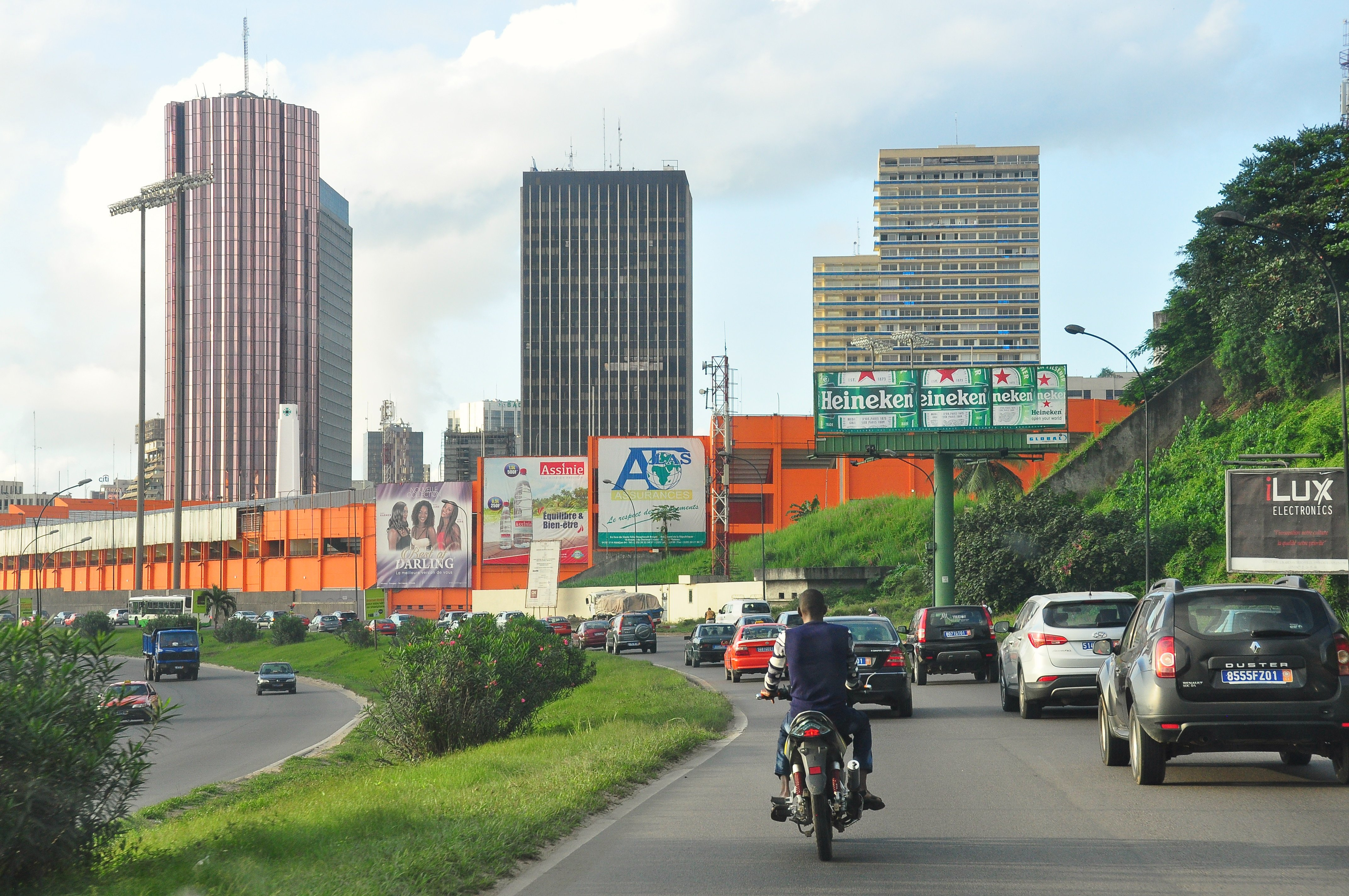
A view of the Plateau district in Abidjan

- Abobo consists mainly of public housing. Abobo has a large population of low-income migrants. This area has developed spontaneously.
- Adjamé developed from the village of Ébrié, which existed before Abidjan developed. Although polluted and small in size, this commune is commercially very important for the Ivorian economy. It contains a varied shopping district and its bus station is the Côte d'Ivoire's main hub for international bus lines.
- Yopougon is the most populous commune of Abidjan, lying partly in Northern Abidjan and partly across the lagoon in Southern Abidjan. It is home to both industrial and residential areas. The research station ORSTOM, the Pasteur Institute, and a training hospital are located in this commune.
- Plateau is Ivory Coast's business center, with very modern, tall buildings. Although the governmental and administrative capital of Côte d'Ivoire officially transferred to Yamoussoukro in 1983, the institutions of the republic such as the Presidency and National Assembly are still located in Plateau. It is the main administrative, commercial and financial center of Ivory Coast.
- Attécoubé contains Banco forest, classified as a national park.
- Cocody is famous for its residential districts, Deux-Plateaux and Riviera. The Université Félix Houphouët-Boigny, a public institution, and some private universities are also located within the commune. Radiodiffusion télévision ivoirienne is located in Cocody. The President of the Republic also resides in this commune, which contains the embassy district.

==== Communes of Southern Abidjan ====
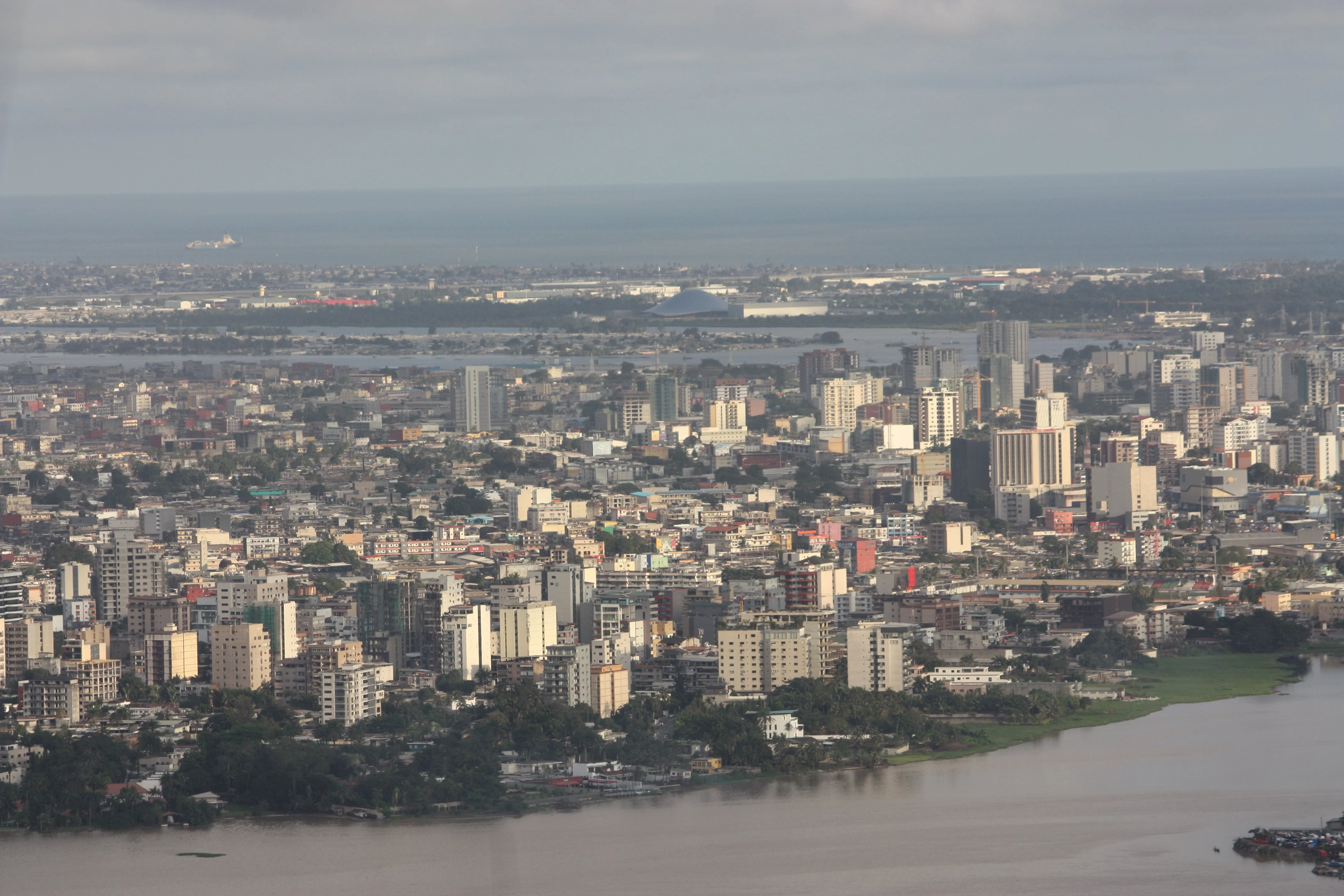
Marcory in January 2025 seen from the Tour F under construction. In the background the dome of the Abidjan Exhibition Centre and the Atlantic Ocean.

- Koumassi: This commune has an important industrial area.
- Marcory: This commune is mainly residential, and contains the upscale Biétry and Zone 4 neighborhoods where many foreigners live.
- Port-Bouët: This commune includes the Société Ivoirienne de Raffinage refinery and the Félix-Houphouët-Boigny International Airport. There is also an established office of the IRD, the centre of Little Bassam. The famous lighthouse sweeps the Gulf of Guinea for several nautical miles out. The Vridi beach area is busy every weekend although the ocean is very rough; this phenomenon widely holds all along the Gulf of Guinea. From 1950 on, Vridi has been the primary employment hub in Abidjan because of its increasing number of factories and warehouses.
- Treichville: This commune is home to the Autonomous Port of Abidjan and to many stores. The port area is also industrial. There is also the Treichville state swimming pool (PET), the Treichville sports palace, the Palace of Culture, and the Abidjan racetrack.
  - Île Boulay.

==== Suburbs ====
Towns near Abidjan include Jacqueville, Grand-Lahou and Dabou in the west; Sikensi, Tiassalé, Agboville, Adzopé and Alépé in the north; and Grand-Bassam to the east.

The towns (or sub-prefectures) of Anyama, Bingerville, Brofodoumé and Songon are within the Abidjan Department, which is co-extensive with the autonomous district.

== Politics ==
=== Administration ===
==== Organisation ====
Formerly managed by the French colonial administration, Abidjan became a municipality (commune) in 1956, divided into administrative areas by lagoons. Its first municipal council was elected on 18 November 1956, and the first mayor in the context of the Loi-Cadre of 1956 was president Félix Houphouët-Boigny.

List of successive mayors
Date of election	Name	Party	Background	Status
1956	Félix Houphouët-Boigny	PDCI-RDA	Politician	Elected
	Antoine Filidori		Industry	Appointed
	Jean Porquet		Industry	Appointed
	Antoine Konan Kanga	PDCI-RDA	Politician	Appointed
1980	Emmanuel Dioulo	PDCI-RDA	Politician	Elected
1985	Mobio N'Koumo	PDCI-RDA	Politician	Elected

In 1980, the municipality of Abidjan (commune d'Abidjan) was transformed into the City of Abidjan (Ville d'Abidjan), and its territory was divided in 10 communes. A city council and mayor of the City of Abidjan elected by the population oversaw the entire city, whereas 10 municipal councils also elected by the population managed each commune. Dioulo Emmanuel was elected mayor of the City of Abidjan on 30 November 1980.

In 2001, the City of Abidjan was disbanded and replaced by a larger Autonomous District of Abidjan. The autonomous district overlaps the Abidjan Department, which was established in 1969 and has had its current boundaries since 1998. The district is made up of the 10 communes of the former City of Abidjan, and of 4 outlying sub-prefectures: Anyama, Bingerville, Brofodoumé, and Songon. Since the 2000s, the built-up area of Abidjan has largely expanded into these 4 formerly rural sub-prefectures.

As a result of the creation of the Autonomous District of Abidjan in 2001, the post of Mayor of City of Abidjan was replaced by that of District Governor, appointed by the head of state. The position has been occupied by Ibrahim Bacongo Cissé since 2023. The District Governor manages Abidjan along with an assembly, the Autonomous District Council (Conseil du District Autonome), one-third of whose members are appointed by the government of Ivory Coast, and two-third are representatives from the municipal councils of the communes making up the district. Each of the ten communes of Abidjan has its own municipal council, headed by a mayor. The last municipal elections were held in 2018. The sub-prefectures of the autonomous district also have their own mayors and councils.

Location of the autonomous district of Abidjan

The 10 communes of the former City of Abidjan, now included in the larger Autonomous District of Abidjan

Commune	Mayor	Political party
Abobo	Adama Toungara	RDR
Adjamé	Youssouf Sylla	RDR
Attécoubé	Danho Paulin	PDCI-RDA
Cocody	Jean-Marc Yacé	PDCI-RDA
Le Plateau	Akossi Noel Bendjo	PDCI-RDA
Yopougon	Gbamnan Djidan Jean Félicien	FPI
Treichville	François Amichia	PDCI-RDA
Koumassi	N'Dohi Yapi Raymond	PDCI-RDA
Marcory	Marcellin Akanda Assi	FPI
Port-Bouët	Hortense Aka-Anghui	PDCI-RDA

The communes of Abobo, Adjamé, Attécoubé, Cocody, and Plateau are located north of the Ébrié Lagoon (hence the name "Abidjan North"). This is the continental part of Abidjan. The commune of Yopougon straddles the lagoon, with part lying north and part south of that body of water. The communes of Treichville, Koumassi, Marcory, and Port-Bouet in Abidjan are south of the lagoon. Blokosso and Locodjro villages are included within the city and maintain cultural identity in urban areas.

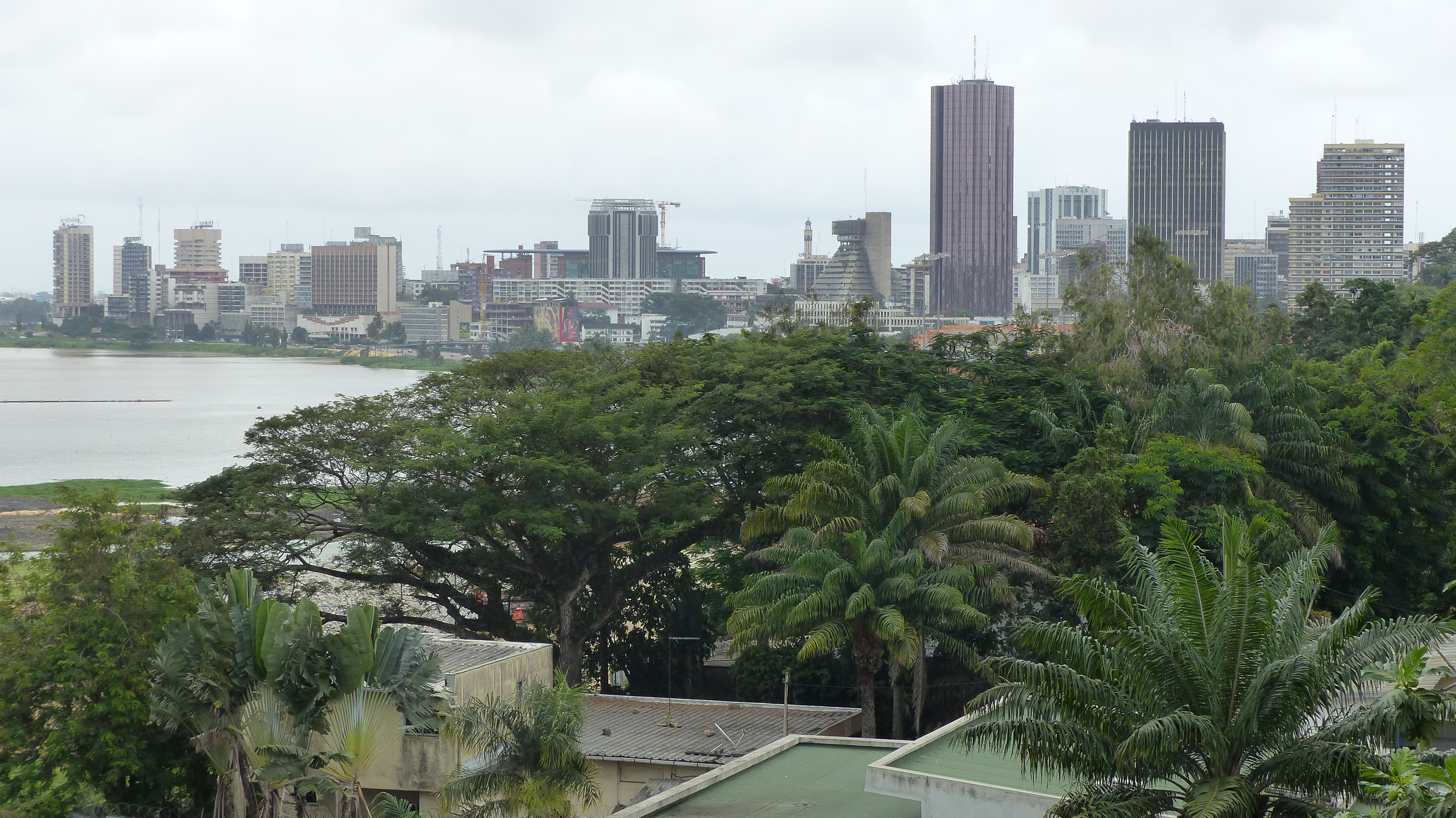
Le Plateau, Abidjan

== Education ==
The Université Félix Houphouët-Boigny was founded in 1964.

In Ivory Coast, the enrollment rate is 74% and access to secondary education is limited by an entrance assessment at the 6th stage after which one-third of students are allowed to continue their studies. 24% of the student population resides in Abidjan, which comprises 20% of the total population. Abidjan is the location of the main educational institutions in Ivory Coast. These include the Lycée Classique d'Abidjan, the Lycée Sainte-Marie de Cocody, Lycée garçon de Bingerville, and Mami Adjoua the Lyceum. The Blaise Pascal Abidjan school is a French school – a school who has signed an agreement with the AEFE. Recently the Lycée International Jean-Mermoz re-opened which was initially called College International Jean-Mermoz, founded by Pierre Padovani. The Institution suffered from a devastating war and was forced to close. The city also hosts a campus of the HEC Paris business school.

== Government institutions ==
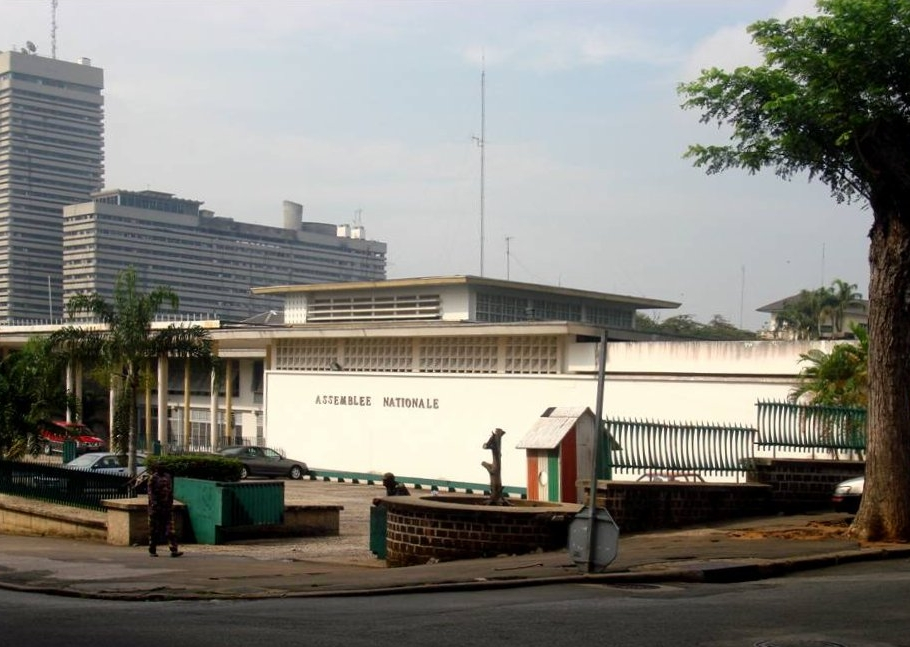
Seat of the National Assembly of Cote d'Ivoire

The majority of Ivorian government institutions are still located in Abidjan and have not been transferred to the political capital, Yamoussoukro. The President's office is in Cocody, and the parliament, the Constitutional Council, the Supreme Court, and the Chancellery of the National Order are all in Le Plateau. Under the presidency of Laurent Gbagbo (2000–11), efforts were made to give effect to the project of making the political capital Yamoussoukro in Côte d'Ivoire. This goal continues to be the consensus of the country's political leaders.

Government offices are located in Le Plateau in the administrative district of Abidjan, Boulevard Carde or Angoulvant Boulevard (near the Cathedral of St. Paul of Abidjan), or elsewhere in the great buildings of the town.

== Security ==
The instability of the 2002–2007 civil war and 2010–2011 crisis saw foreign peacekeeping forces stationed in Abidjan. The United Nations Operation in Côte d'Ivoire (UNOCI), established in April 2004, has its headquarters at the former Hotel Sebroko in Attécoubé. While the size of the force has been reduced since the end of the 2011 crisis, UNOCI's mandate was extended in 2013 and again in 2015. The force remains authorized to maintain up to 5,245 troops, 192 observers, 1,500 police and eight customs officers in the country.

France's peacekeeping operations in Ivory Coast continued under the aegis of Operation Unicorn until 2015 and then as the French forces in Côte d'Ivoire from 2015 onward. In 2014, French defense minister Jean-Yves Le Drian announced that Abidjan would be reinforced as the entry point for France's military presence and counterterrorism operations in the Sahel region. After al-Qaeda militants targeted beachgoers at Grand-Bassam in March 2016, the French government announced it would increase its troop deployment in Côte d'Ivoire from 500 to 900. French soldiers are based in Port-Bouet as well as at the Abidjan airport.

In 2007, Pierre Laba's comedy film Permanent Danger explored the laxity of the police against banditry in major African cities, specifically in Abidjan.

=== Police ===
Abidjan is divided into districts, each of which has a police station. The municipal police and national police are separate.

All police are trained at the National Police Academy in the town of Cocody. They are recruited by competitive examination held by the police administration. The police include several sections, such as the BAE (Anti Riot Squad), whose base is located in Yopougon north of the city, the CRS (Republican Security Company), whose main base is located in Williamsville (Adjame) and also includes a secondary base called CRS2, which is located in Zone 4 in the town of Marcory in the central capital. The Force and CECOS accompany the police.

The main base of the gendarmerie is at Agban (commonly Adjamé). There are others in Abobo and Koumassi. A training school is in Cocody and the city.

=== Drugs ===
Since 2000, Ivory Coast has experienced a sharp rise in drug trafficking. Drug dens arise mainly in informal settlements and there has been a recent spike in demand among unemployed youth and Ivorian vagrants. The Ivorian police increasingly focus on the fight against trafficking and drug use in the district of Abidjan. A report by the Office of the UN says West Africa plays an increasingly important role in the transit of cocaine between Latin America and Europe. In May 2007, seven drug houses were dismantled and 191 people arrested including a military officer.

=== French military base ===
Abidjan is home to Port-Bouet, one of the six French military bases that still exist in Africa (Dakar, Libreville, Bouar CAR, N'Djamena and Djibouti). Thousands of people live there, around the 43rd BIMA which is permanently in place in accordance with established defence agreements on 24 April 1961 linking the two countries.

== Relationships and partnerships ==
=== Diplomacy and international bodies ===
Abidjan is the regional headquarters of major international institutions, including UNICEF, the UN Development Programme, the World Health Organization, the World Food Programme, the United Nations Office for Project Services, the United Nations Population Fund, the International Labour Organization, the International Monetary Fund, and the International Fund for Agricultural Development. Diplomatic missions in Ivory Coast are mostly located in Abidjan.

The African Development Bank (ADB), the largest financial institution in Africa, is headquartered in Abidjan.

==== Twin towns – Sister cities ====
Abidjan is sisters with:

- Tianjin, China
- Marseille, France
- São Paulo, Brazil
- San Francisco, United States
- Alfortville, France (twinned with Cocody)
- Kumasi, Ghana (twinned with Treichville)
- Pontault-Combault, France (twinned with Anyama)
- Boulogne-Billancourt, France
- Yokohama, Japan
- Basel, Switzerland

== Society ==
The 2021 census recorded Abidjan's population as 6,321,017. As Abidjan is inhabited by people from a wide array of different ethnicities, French is commonly spoken in the metropolitan area, which is the third largest French-speaking metropolitan area in the world after Kinshasa and Paris. Colloquial Abidjan French has appeared, which has a different pronunciation and some slang words different from standard French. Abidjan is recognized as one of the few areas in Africa where French (colloquial Abidjan French) is truly a native tongue, along with Libreville, Gabon.

=== Demographics ===
The District of Abidjan's population was 6,321,017 at the 14 December 2021 census, up from 4,707,404 at the 15 May 2014 census.

Population increase, lower in the 2000s due to the economic crisis and Ivorian Civil War, has picked up in the 2010s to levels unseen since the 1980s thanks to the rapid economic growth experienced by Abidjan after the return of peace in 2012. Many inhabitants come to live in Abidjan for employment and better standards of living.

Demographic evolution
Year	City of Abidjan (422 km^{2}) (disbanded in 2001)	District of Abidjan (2,119 km^{2}) (created in 2001)	Yearly growth
1912	1,400	—	—
1928	5,400	—	+8.80%
1939	22,000	—	+13.62%
1948	48,000	—	+9.06%
1955	125,000	—	+14.65%
1963	254,000	—	+8.70%
1975	951,216	—	+11.81%
1988	1,929,079	—	+5.65%
1998	2,877,948	3,133,608	+3.79%
2014	—	4,707,404	+2.68%
2021	—	6,321,017	+3.96%
Sources: City: 1912–1948 administrative estimates, 1955 INSEE census, 1963 SEMA demographic survey, 1975–1998 INS censuses. District: 1998 INS census, 2014 INS census, 2021 INS census.

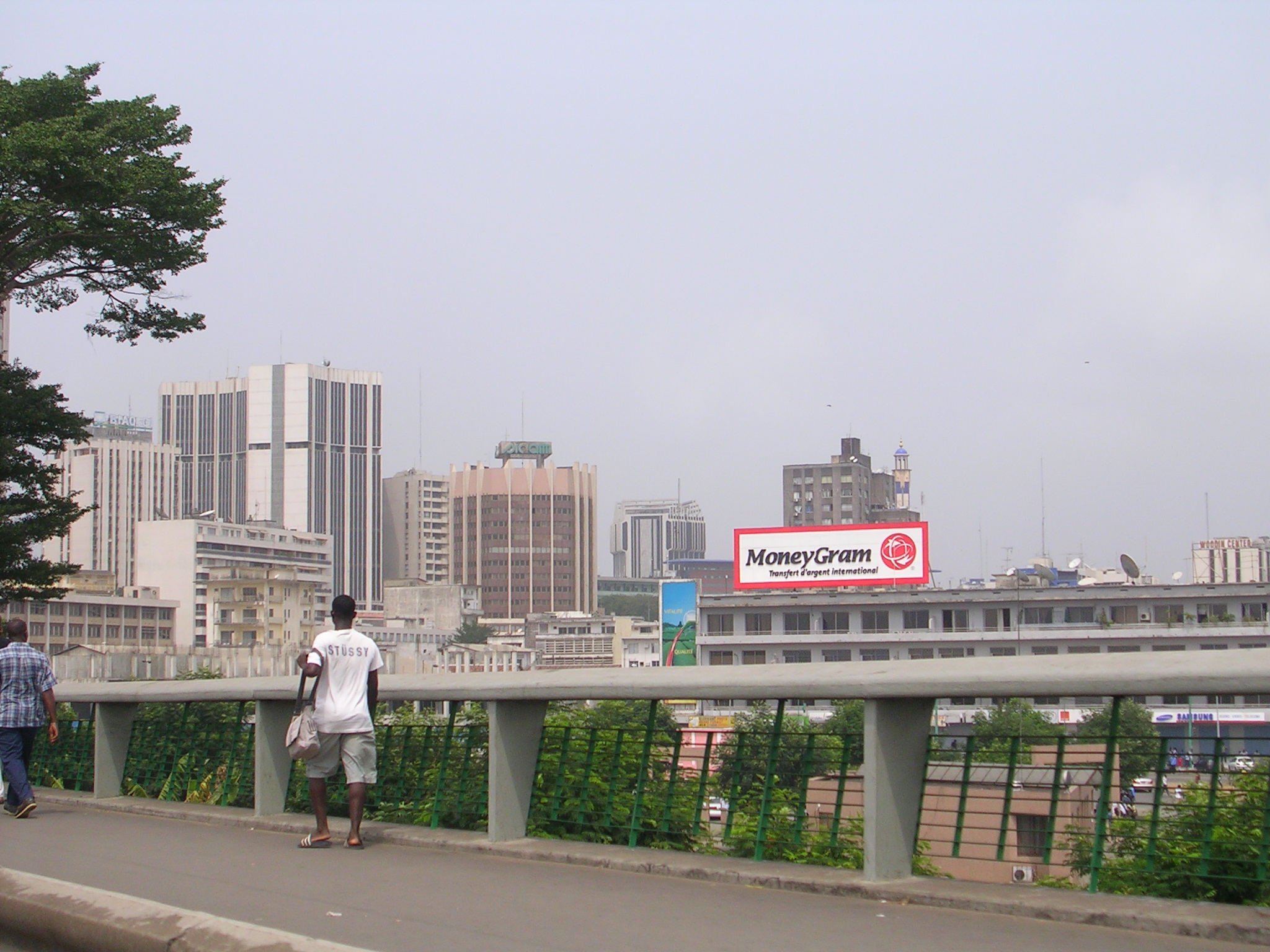
Abidjan Centre

By 1950, Abidjan had just exceeded a population of 50,000 (at the end of 1948). Reaching a population of a million by the end of 1975, the city grew at a rate of 10 to 12% per year, doubling every six or seven years. However, this growth underwent a sharp decline due to the crises of the 1980s and 1990s. In the last 20 years of the 20th century, the growth rate dropped to 3–6%. Birth rate growth was supplemented by migration, with the influx being substantial and the outflow only partly offseting the arrivals. The migration, prior to the census of 1988, contributed a growth of about 80,000 with 50,000 people from within Ivory Coast, and about 30,000 from abroad per year.

From within Ivory Coast, the migration pattern was dominated by Akan (South-east, 48%), then Mandé (North-west, 24%) and Krou (South-west, 20%). From abroad, the migration was Burkinabes (30%), Malians (22%), Ghanaians (19%), Nigerien (11%), and Guineans (9%). Of the non-African migration, Lebanese migration was highest, followed by European migration, with the French being largest of this latter group. All in all, people of non-African origin represent 3% of the total population of Abidjan, which remains the highest in the region.

=== Languages ===
The traditional language of the city's region is Ebrié. Since the colonial period, the official language in Abidjan and throughout Côte d'Ivoire has been French. While the official language is a standard variety of French similar to that of Paris, the most commonly spoken form of French in Abidjan is a colloquial dialect known as français de Treichville or français de Moussa which differs from standard French in pronunciation and in some of its vocabulary. Another form of spoken French in Abidjan is Nouchi, a highly informal variety used as adolescent slang. The historical lingua franca, still spoken and understood by most of the trading population of Abidjan, is Dioula. The city is home to Ivorians from throughout the country and about sixty vernacular languages are spoken, such as Attié, Baoulé, Bété, and Wobé. Abidjan is surrounded by more than thirty villages where Baoulé and Ébrié are still commonly spoken.

=== Religion ===
Religion in Abidjan (2021 census)
Religion	Percent
Christianity	47.7%
Islam	46.0%
None	3.6%
Traditional	0.3%
Other	2.4%

Abidjan has a religiously diverse population. According to the 2021 census, Christianity is the plurality religion in the city (47.7%), followed closely by Islam (46.0%) and those with no religion (3.6%). A smaller share of residents adhere to traditional religions or other faiths.

=== Health ===
Some traditional medicine establishments sell traditional drugs in the street. There are numerous health centers, pharmacies and pharmacopoeias. The city has more than fifty clinics, and over sixty specialist locations (veterinary, dermatology, dental, optometry, motherhood, psychology, pediatrics, etc.).

=== Urbanism and habitat ===
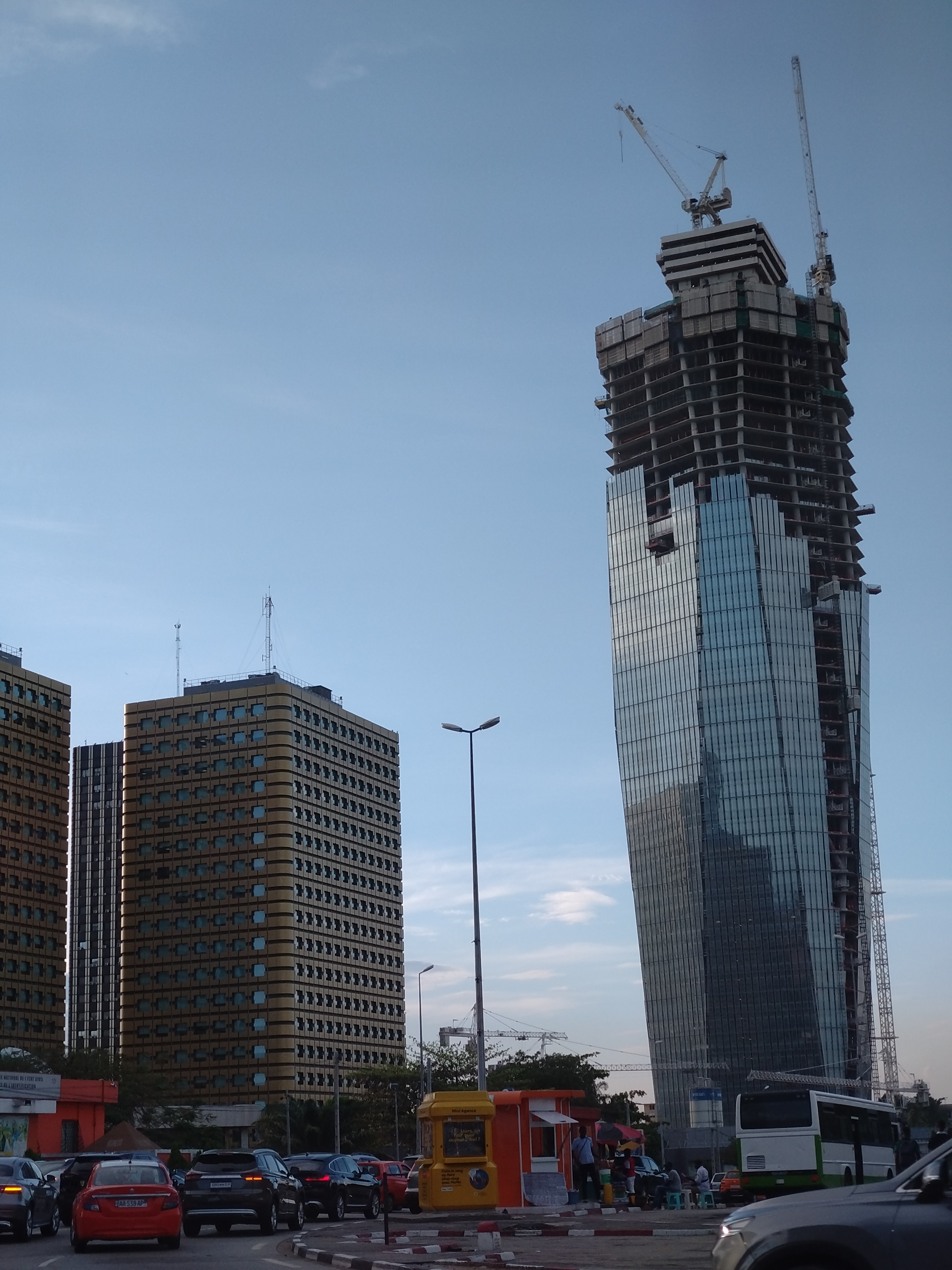
Tour F, under construction in 2024 in the central administrative district of Le Plateau, should be the tallest skyscraper in subsaharan Africa at more than 300 meters (1,000 ft) in height.

Modern districts like Plateau or Cocody have developed similar to those in Europe with the construction of large office towers and apartment buildings between the 1970s and the mid-1980s. The CCIA building (Abidjan International Trade Center Building), a skyscraper, was completed in 1982.

Traditional neighborhoods like Treichville or Marcory maintained the system of "concessions" where housing is adjacent to the plant and an area of several houses, within the normal organization and multi centuries-old African villages.

The district of Cocody is also home to many single-storey wooden villas, surrounded by vast gardens of lush vegetation, fed by the heavy rains that water the city. Wealthier inhabitants constructed villas in imitation of Greek temples in this district. In addition, many houses were built on stilts on the edge of the Ébrié Lagoon. The town hall, a fine example of modernist architecture, was designed by architect Henri Chomette.

==== Problems with urban network ====
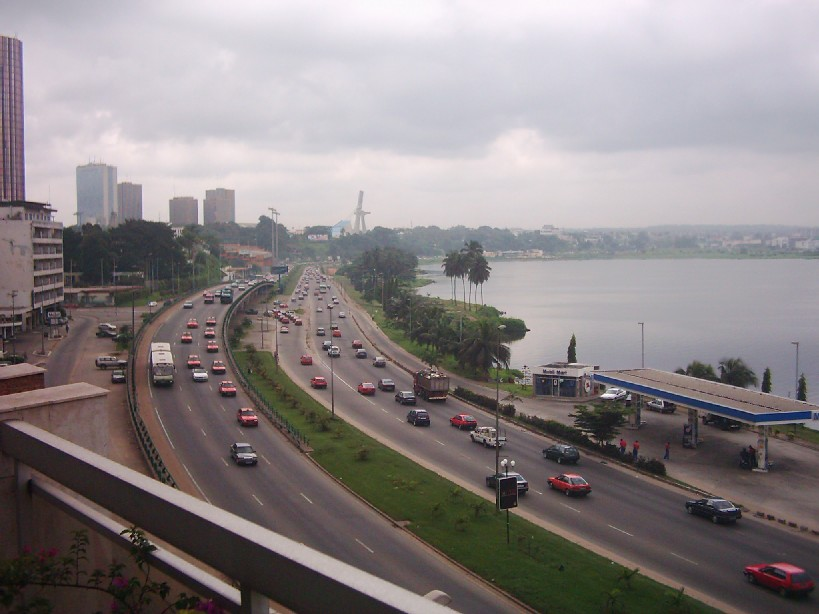
Urban Network in Le Plateau

The urban network is disrupted, as Abidjan has seen its population double every seven years since 1945. Rural people are attracted by the opportunities of the city. Abidjan represents 45% of city dwellers in Ivory Coast and 20% of the overall population. The city is by far the country's largest, dwarfing the second-largest city, Bouaké (which had 542,082 inhabitants in 2014) as well as the political capital, Yamoussoukro (207,412 inhabitants).

==== Urban squalor ====
Since the 2006 Probo Koala toxic waste dumping incident, significant efforts have been made to address waste management issues in Abidjan. In 2006, a contract was signed between China and Ivory Coast: a Chinese company handling urban waste and industrial plans to treat all waste district this transformation also create daily cleaning.

French nongovernmental organisation ACTED rolled out a three-part project across three districts of Abidjan in 2016, establishing street cleaning, waste collection and hygiene training. ACTED spokesperson Jérémy Lescot described the project as "a fine success".

==== Urban rehabilitation ====
The last transportation upgrade in Abidjan led to the repaving of certain roads in the capital in 1994. Since May 2007, the company Ageroute (Road Management Agency) is undertaking major operations in Abidjan and Anyama relating to badly damaged roads, suffering from lack of maintenance, heavy rain and protests. It is also addressing the gutters and unpaved roads. The District and BNETD plan to rehabilitate and construct 400 to 500 miles (640–800 kilometres), providing them with a quality to last 15–20 years of life. Improvements include the rehabilitation of roads in Abidjan and Anyama, construction of drains, the tarring of gravel roads and sanitation of the city by the construction of sewers. These rehabilitations affect all municipalities in Abidjan:

- In Cocody, at a cost of 3 billion CFA franc, reconstruction of the Corniche, one of the busiest roads in the municipality. Reconstruction has been extended by the dam of the limit, located at the Carrefour de la vie, to filter all waste dumped into the lagoon.
- At Yopougon, the rehabilitation nerve Sand continues with the construction of a culvert 200 feet (61 metres) long designed to slow the streaking wastewater, the main cause of the degradation of pathways.
- In Abobo the degradation of the roads requires a significant investment in manufacturing and installation of gutters to ensure proper sanitation. The rehabilitation of roads and highways continues.

== Notable people ==
- Simon Adingra (born 2002), footballer
- Patrick Bohui (born 2003), footballer
- Fatou Bolli (born 1952), novelist
- Amad Diallo (born 2002), footballer
- Lassina Diomandé (born 1979), footballer
- Didier Drogba (born 1978), footballer
- Modeste Gnakpa (born 1988), footballer
- Marc Guéhi (born 2000), footballer
- Ediémou Blin Jacob (1945-2026), priest
- Kader Kohou (born 1998), American football player
- Ismaël Koné (born 2002), footballer
- Christian Kouamé (born 1997), footballer
- Arnaud Monney (born 1981), footballer
- Anderson Lago Zeze (born 1989), footballer
- Olivia Yacé (born 1998), beauty queen, Tourism Ambassador of Ivory Coast
- Wilfried Zaha (born 1992), footballer

== Economy ==
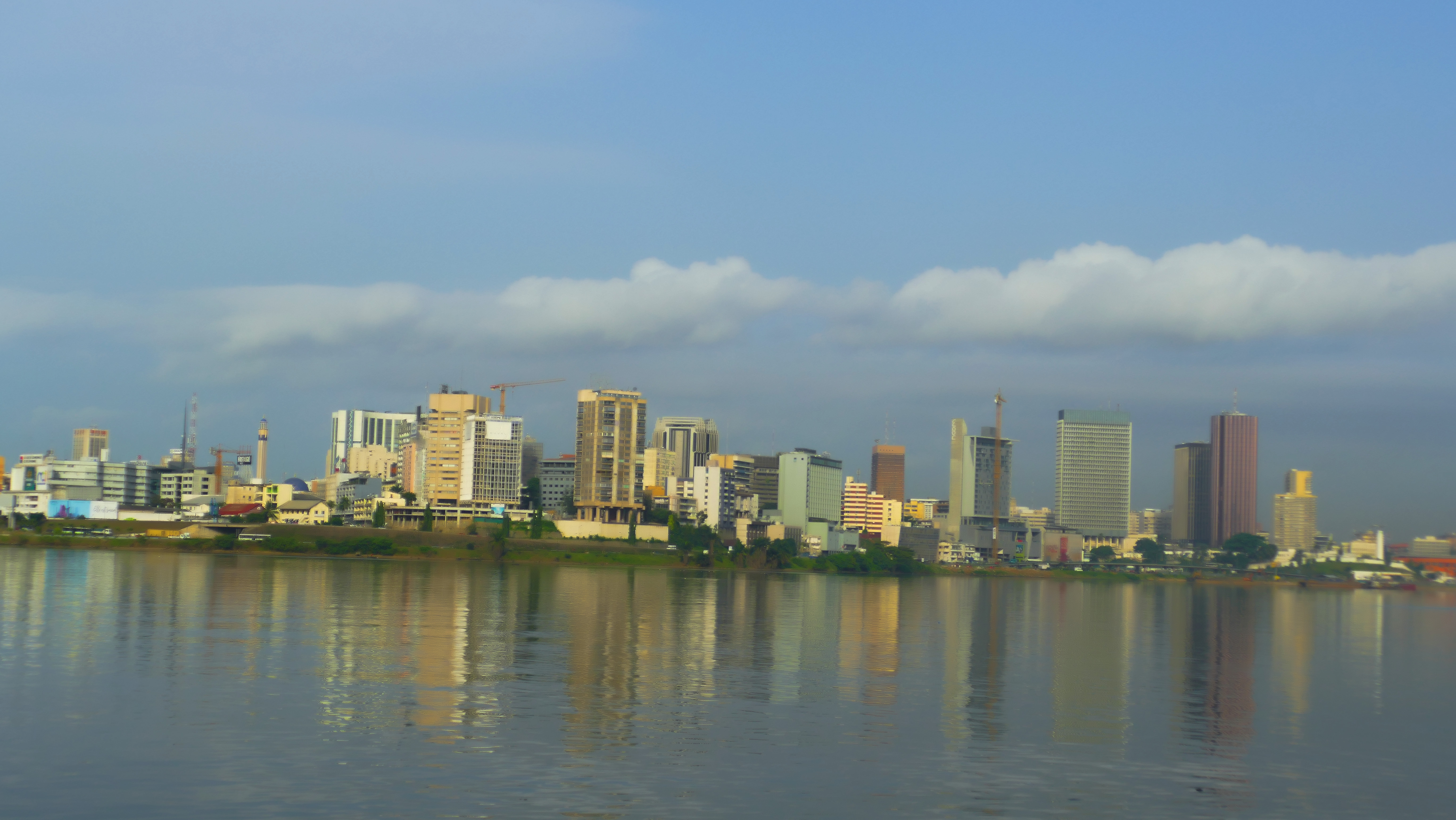
Skyline of the Plateau central business district

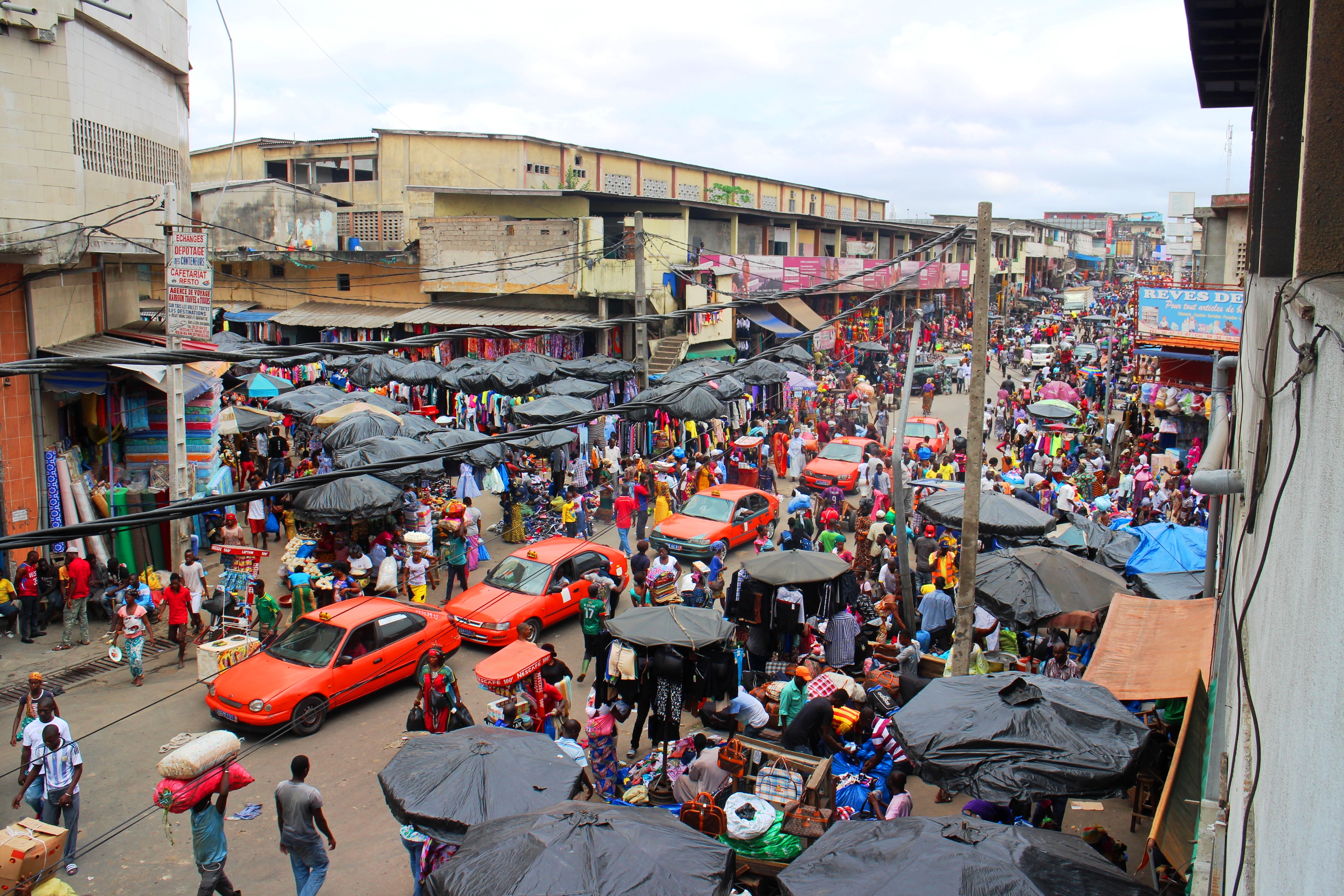
Market in Adjamé

The principal stock exchange of Ivory Coast and the other seven countries of the Union Économique et Monétaire Ouest Africaine (UEMOA), (Note: Bénin, Burkina Faso, Guinée-Bissau, Mali, Niger, Sénégal, and Togo.) Bourse Régionale des Valeurs Mobilières (BRVM), is located in Abidjan. Air Ivoire had its head office in Abidjan. Prior to its dissolution, Air Afrique was headquartered in Abidjan.

== Industry ==
The region near the lagoons is the most industrialized region of the country.

Major industries include food processing, lumber, automobile manufacturing, textiles, chemicals, and soap. There is also a large oil refinery. Its industries are mainly in construction and maintenance with the presence of major international groups: the furnace SETAO, Colas, Bouygues, Jean Lefebvre, and Swiss Holcim.

There are textile industries with the packaging of cotton in the north both for export or for on-site processing of cloth, canvas, batik clothing and miscellaneous. The textile sector is very dynamic, and represents 15.6% of net investment, 13% of turnover and 24% of the value added in Ivorian industry.

There are several offshore oil wells in operation (Côte d'Ivoire is an oil producing country), which leads to the presence of a chemical industry with oil refineries, and an oil port. It also works on stones and precious metals for exportation

The city also has a large wood processing plant at the port by river from the forests of central Canada. It exports natural mahogany, peeled wood, plywood and chipboard for the past two centuries.

Food industry mainly include: the production of palm oil, bergamot and Seville oranges. In the west, rubber is processed as well as manufacturing beverages from pineapples, oranges and mangoes, producing robusta coffee: Côte d'Ivoire is the third largest producer, behind Colombia and Brazil and processing cocoa, it is the largest producer in the world ahead of Ghana and Indonesia. (37% of cocoa and 10% of coffee products undergo at least one first local processing). Abidjan is also the first African tuna port for the European market. This generated 3,000 salaried jobs and is an important source of foreign exchange. As in all countries of the Third World developing countries, much of the city's economy lies in what economists describe as informal economy with its many "odd jobs".

=== Tertiary sector ===
The development of tertiary industry, with the establishment of international commercial banks and the increasing number of service companies of all types, appears to be the trend of recent years. Abidjan is the main financial center of French West Africa. The seat of the common stock exchange of West Africa (BRVM) is located in Abidjan. BRVM is mainly dominated by Ivorian firms.

=== Electricity ===
The thermal power plant Azito, built in 1997 in partnership with EDF, located on the Yopougon on the edge of the lagoon and facing Ébrié Island Boulay, alone provides 300 MW. Two other power plants, built in 1984 and 1985, are installed in Vridi. Several utilities are installed in Abidjan: CI Energies, formerly SOPIE, which is a corporation state, ICE and CIPREL, subsidiaries of the French group SAUR Côte d'Ivoire produces all the electricity it consumes, and exports to neighboring countries, Ghana, Togo, Benin, Mali and Burkina Faso through the interconnection.

The production, which increases steadily, and gas storage are provided by two state companies: PETROCI and GESTOCI. A small industry of renewable energy production has also developed.

=== Telecommunication and ICT ===
The city has a powerful fixed telephone network of 450,000 lines (in 2004) managed by Côte d'Ivoire Telecom. Broadband Internet connections, leased lines and ADSL are powered by various providers: Aviso Ivory Coast Telecoms. Africa is Line, Globe Access, Afnet.

=== Banking system ===
Abidjan hosts offices of international financial institutions including the World Bank, International Monetary Fund, African Development Bank, BOAD, as well as the Banking Commission of WAEMU, the regional stock exchange and subsidiaries of international banks such as BNP Paribas, General bank, Crédit Lyonnais, Citibank, JPMorgan Chase & Co., Barclays. Sixteen national banks, including SGBCI and BICI, maintain a network of 170 branches, alongside seven financial institutions and more than thirty insurance companies.

=== Transportation ===
Trains on the line to Ouagadougou run from several stations in the city, the most important being in Treichville. Ferries link Treichville, Abobo-Doumé and Le Plateau. Félix-Houphouët-Boigny International Airport serves the city. Work on a new metro system has begun, with the beginning of service expected in 2028.

SOTRA (Abidjan Transport Company) ensure urban transportation in Abidjan via bus, taxi and luggage Line Express.

SOTRA has announced the start of work for the use of light rail to Abidjan. The project has three phases at a cost of 125 billion CFA francs for a long loop of 32 km.

==== Taxis ====
There are two kinds: the taxi-meter (red), which can travel throughout the city, and woro-woro (yellow and green, blue or orange depending on the commune), which are limited to a neighborhood.

==== Airport ====
Port Bouet Airport has a large capacity that allows it to accommodate all existing large aircraft. Abidjan is located an hour's flight from all the capitals of the sub-region. Abidjan is served by major airlines in the direction of the great capitals of the world. Headquarters of the former multinational African Air company, Abidjan airport had nearly 2,070,000 passengers in 2017.

==== Circulation ====
The District has several paved streets and boulevards linking the towns between them and the District across the country. Abidjan has a network of urban bypasses.

River transport is already consistent with fishing spots and many "boat-buses" connecting the various neighborhoods of the city thrives plan lagoon.

Abidjan is also the bridgehead of the country's only highway linking the city to the administrative and political capital, Yamoussoukro.

==== Port ====
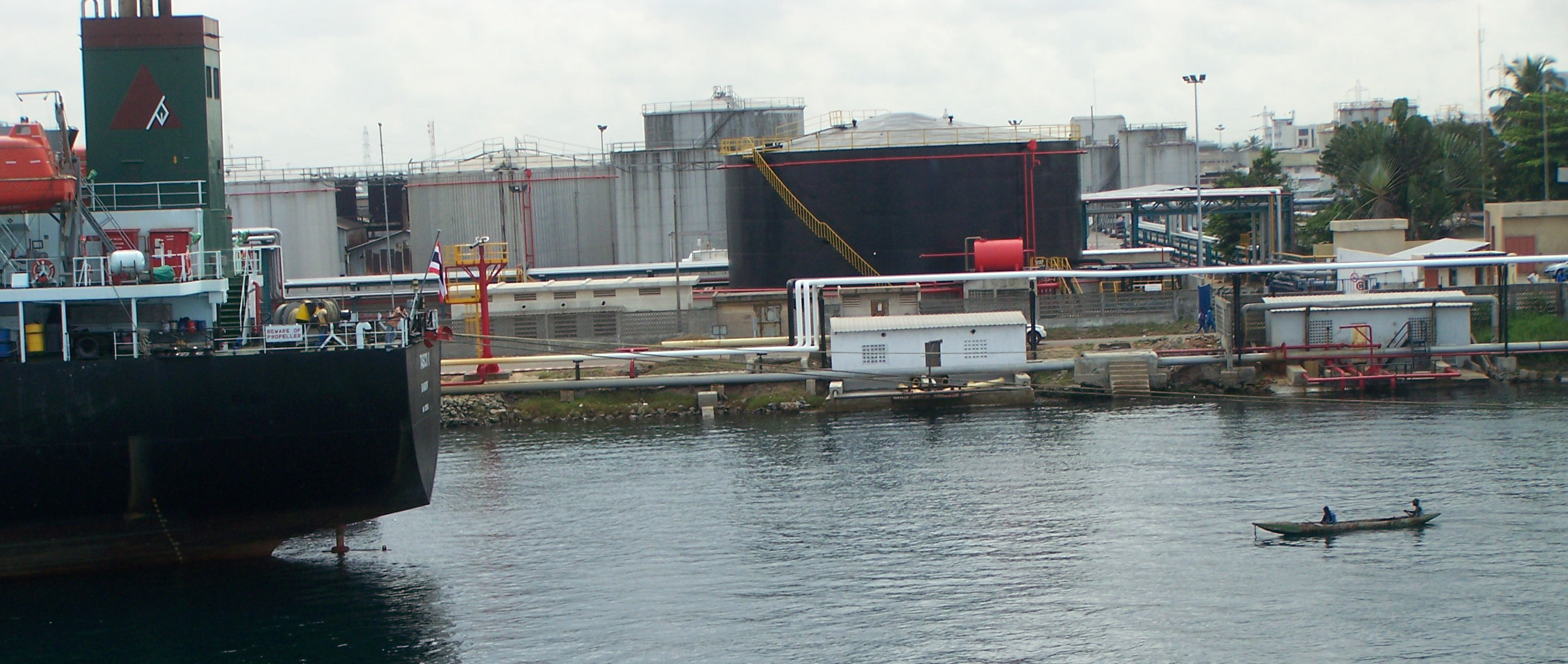
Port of Abidjan, 2009

Abidjan has one of the biggest ports in the sub-region (West Africa). It is a container transshipment port and was opened in 1951 in the presence of the Minister of Overseas and Colonies at the time, François Mitterrand. The 15 m deep Vridi Canal, where boats with large draughts can dock in the deep-water port.

Ivory Coast is in the Franc Zone (where the currency is CFA francs), as part of the West African Economic and Monetary Union (WAEMU). Abidjan is the economic centre of both the Côte d'Ivoire and of the whole region, including Burkina Faso and Mali; this is mainly because of its deep-water port. The road network in Abidjan (5,600 km asphalted in 1995, compared to 1,000 km in 1970), which covers the whole region, effectively increases its port activity as 50% of the business from Burkina Faso, Mali and Niger pass through it.

Abidjan receives the bulk of the country's industrial activity; its port alone receiving 60% of ivory park industry. Abidjan has ambitions of oil-production—off-shore production and especially refining and distribution. In 1995 the port received 12 million tonnes of traffic, of which 5.5 million tonnes were petroleum products.

Exports include coffee, cocoa, timber, bananas, pineapples, and manganese.

==== Bridges ====
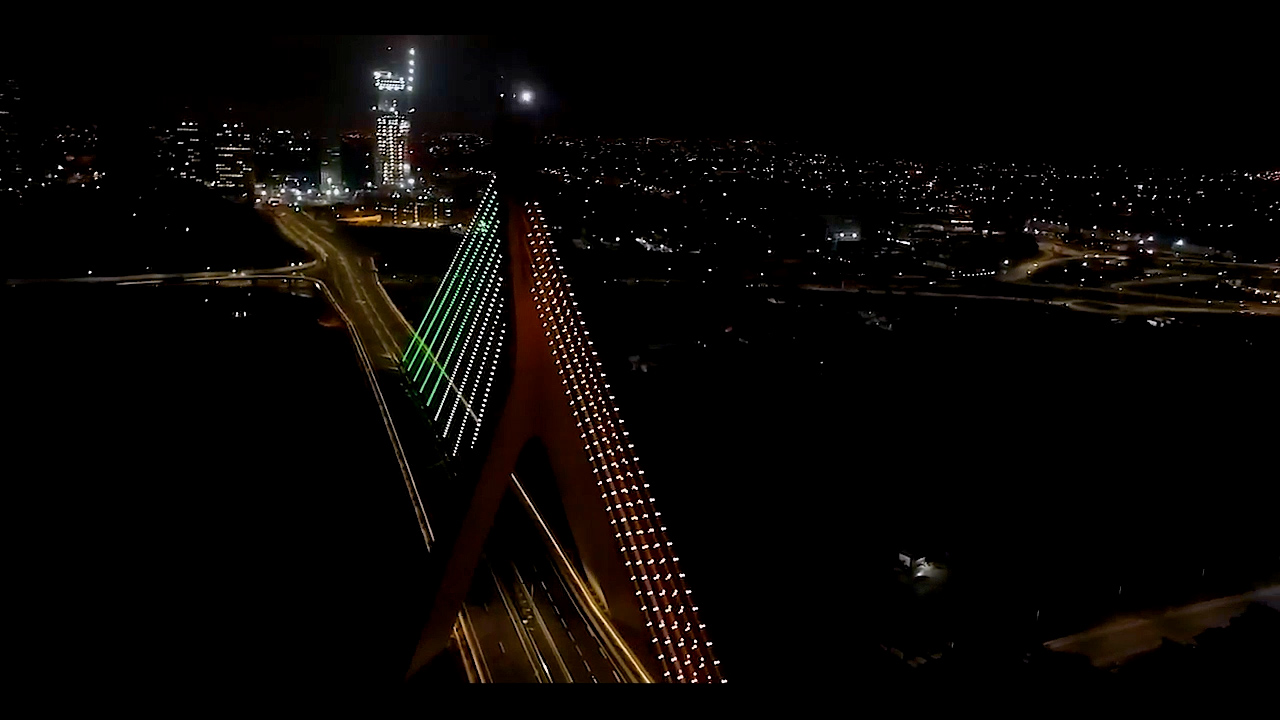
Alassane Ouattara Bridge, completed in 2023, is the 5th bridge over the Abidjan lagoon.

The two-halves of the city, Northern Abidjan and Southern Abidjan, are joined by the Houphouët-Boigny, the Charles de Gaulle and the Henri Konan Bédié bridges. The two former bridges, built in the 1950s and 1960s respectively, are located between Treichville and Le Plateau. The Général-de-Gaulle Bridge extends over the immense Valéry Giscard d'Estaing Boulevard which leads to the airport. Both bridges are often congested, especially during rush hour or on the occasion of police and military roadblocks.

A third 1.5 km (0.93 mi) toll bridge and expressway, the Henri Konan Bédié Bridge between Cocody and Marcory was completed in December 2014. Project construction began in the second half of 2012 and required the relocation of several homes and businesses opposite the Mille Maquis (the noted restaurant la Bâche bleue was moved). According to data reported by the African Development Bank, 2,499 persons were impacted by the bridge construction and were relocated and compensated.

A fourth 1.4 km (0.87 mi) 8-lane toll bridge between Yopougon and Plateau was built between 2018 and 2024.

A fifth 630 m (690 yd) 4-lane toll-free bridge, the Alassane Ouattara Bridge between Cocody and Plateau, was built between 2019 and 2023.

==== Trains and trams ====
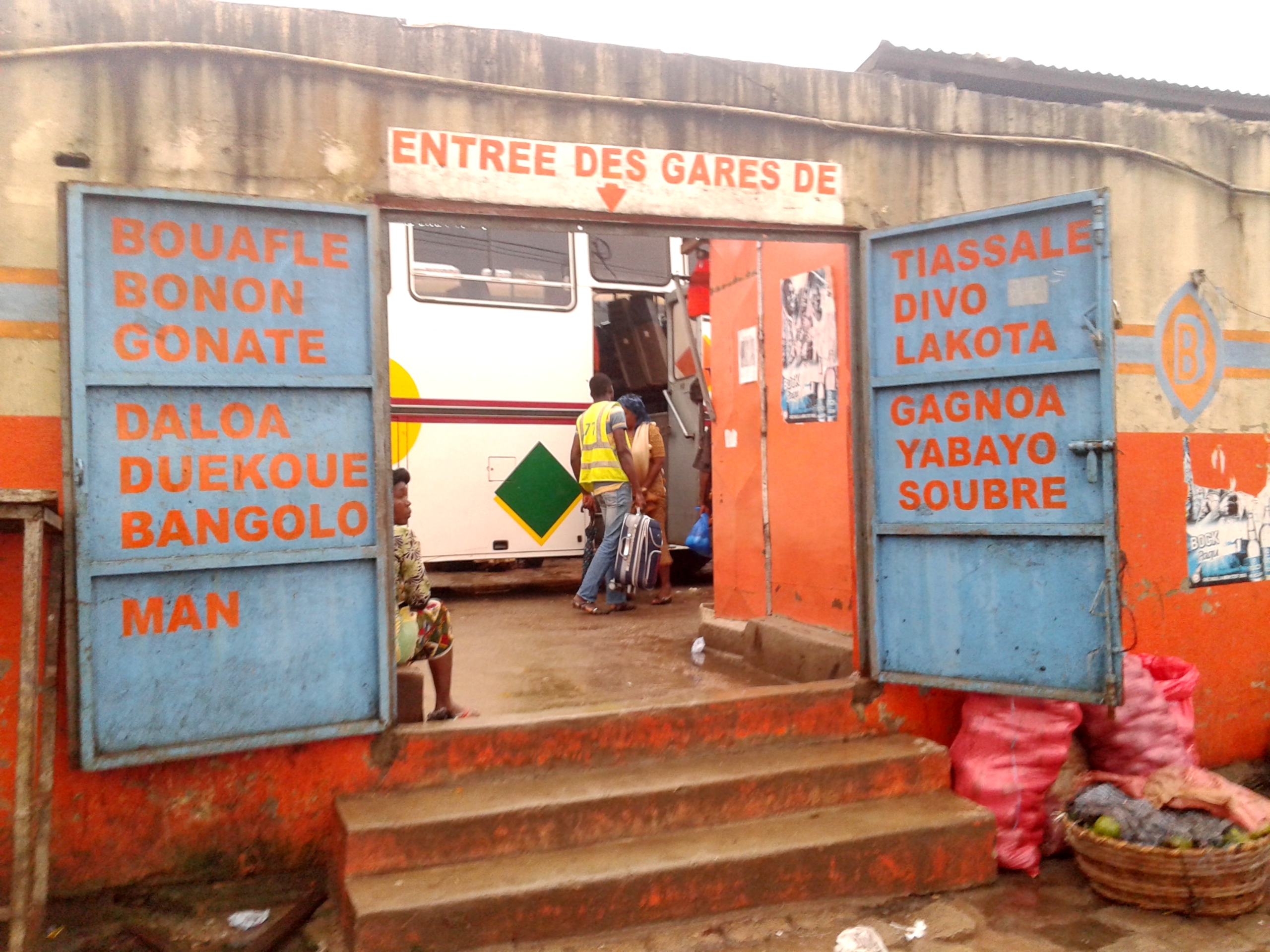
Train platform, Abidjan, 2014

The city is the foothold for the region's only railway: the Abidjan-Ouagadougou line, with stations in Treichville, Abobo and Adjamé. This line only has two trains, the Gazelle and the Bélier, and links the two capitals in about 40 hours.

The most recent project in Abidjan is the Abidjan Metro which is promised by the Ivory Society of Railroads (SICF).

The development of infrastructural projects has been envisaged, including a suburban train system in Abidjan which is estimated to cost almost 100 billion CFA francs. This suburban train system would link the North-West to the East and North of the city. The project extends over 25 km of railway tracks which as of 2011 were used by the operator Sitarail, a subsidiary company of the Bolloré group. The infrastructural works (tracks, electrification, and civil engineers) have been estimated at 40 billion CFA francs, financed by the State of Ivory Coast and backers (World Bank and the French Development Agency). In addition, a BOT concession contract would be given to a private operator, over 20–30 years, to operate the network. This operator will be in charge of the acquisition of railway materials, workshop renovation and the implementation of an organisational system. The concession contract has been estimated to be around 60 billion CFA francs.

=== Tourism ===
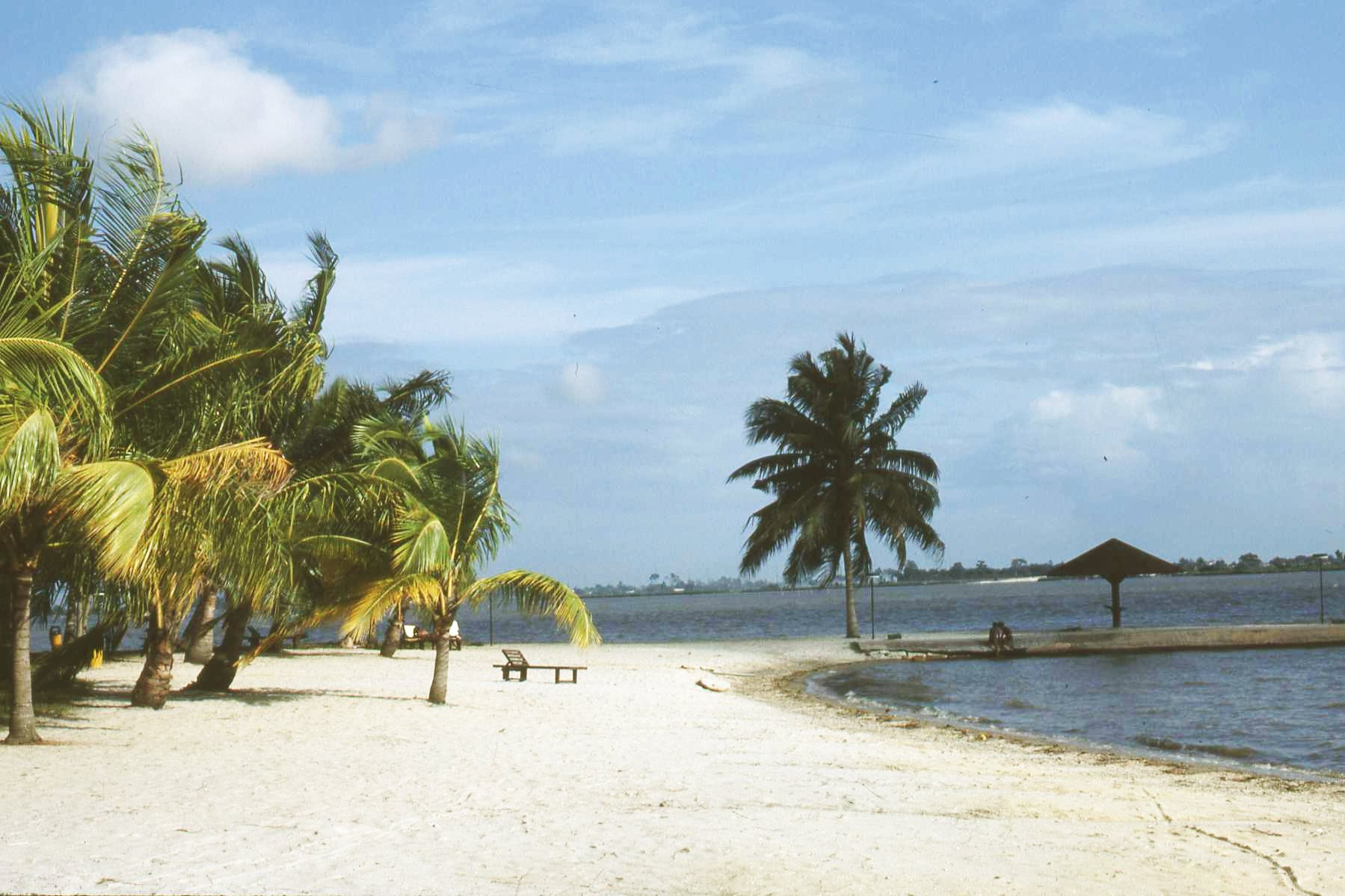
A beach in Cocody

Abidjan has features relevant to tourism such as accommodation facilities (such as the Golf Hôtel), sporting facilities, night life, and transport and communication lines. The city is known by nicknames such as "Manhattan of the tropics", "Small Manhattan" and "Pearl of the lagoons".

Abidjan also has beaches around the lagoon, with palm and coconut trees, in the Vridi area, which are very popular at weekends with the picturesque sight of the pineapple and coconut sellers. Nevertheless, the rip-tides which affects practically the whole of the Gulf of Guinea's coast, means that in this area swimming is not usually allowed. Generally, in Cote d'Ivoire, tourism has never really been developed as an economic industry; the country is not much of a common holiday destination.

==== Parc du Banco (Banco National Park) ====
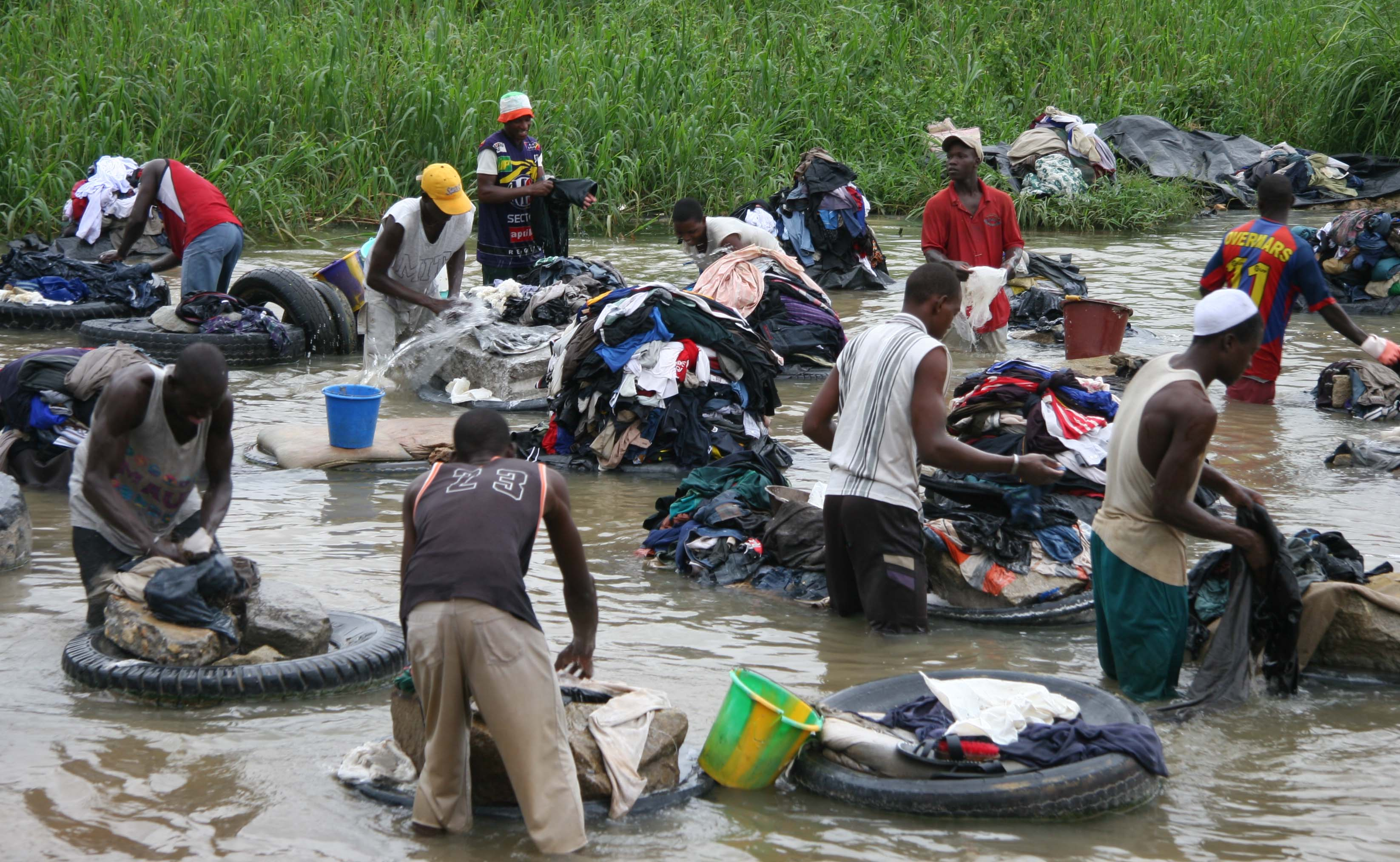
Fanicos, Abidjan's washermen

Converted in 1926, this park has 3,000 hectares and ancient "sacred wood" lies at the entrance to the city, in the Attécoubé community, which has been conserved as a relic of the first forest which surrounded the lagoon in the past. A tarmaced road goes straight to the lake at the heart of the park and trails go throughout it. The park is inhabited and there are coffee and cocoa plantations.

At the edge of the park, a small river serves as a wash-house where the fanicos, laundry men, work after collecting the laundry from the whole of the city. It is one of the 'small jobs' which exist in Abidjan.

==== Nightlife ====
The district has an abundance of night-clubs, maquis, out-door areas, and go-go bars. These entertainment platforms provide a musical 'pipeline' encompassing mainly DJs, Coupé Décalé and Zouglou, and, in lesser amounts, other local and international varieties.

Formerly containing only local traditional varieties, Congolese music and Western music, Abidjan's night life has experienced a positive cultural disruption in its music since the start of the 2000s, with the arrival of Coupé Décalé.

This musical genre was introduced in 2002 by Douk Saga and La Jet Set, with the help of Sagacité, created a phenomenon which has not stopped spreading and reaching out to the hot nights in the capitals of the sub-region. It has given a globally identifiable cultural identity to entertainment 'made in Côte d'Ivoire'.

The Zouglou additionally benefits "Wôyô" spaces; furnished and dedicated so that the most famous, the Internat at Fitini's and the Lycee at Vieux Gazeur's, attract 'zouglouphiles' the whole weekend.

Treichville, with its many maquis, discothèques, and jazz clubs, used to be the liveliest area in the city, but since the end of the 1990s Youpougon, Marcory, and Cocody have taken over this role.

== Culture ==
=== Monuments and museums ===
- The National Library of Côte d'Ivoire
- In Cocody:
  - The Goethe Institute.
  - The Municipal Museum.
  - The American Culture Centre (CCA)
  - The Ki Yi M'Bock Village (in the Riviera).
  - Cocody Museum of Contemporary Art.
  - Point d'Orgue, private music education centre
- In Plateau:
  - The French Cultural Centre (CCF)
  - The Côte d'Ivoire Museum of Civilisations: presents a collection of Ivorian art (statues, masks, jewelry, tools, carved doors, tom-toms and musical instruments from every region in the country).
- In Treichville:
  - The Sports Palace
  - The Cultural Palace.
  - The Abidjan artisanal centre (CAVA)

=== Cinema ===
==== Festivals ====
Each year film festivals are organised in Abidjan: The Clap-Ivoire Festival, the Spanish Film Festival, the Côte d'Ivoire National Film Festival (FESNACI) – the first of which was organised in 2007, the short film festival (FIMA), which has been organised since 1998 by Hanni Tchelley, the Abidjan Israeli Film Festival; the fourth one took place in 2006 in the Goethe Institute.

==== Abidjan in cinema ====
Several films depict or are devoted to the city:

- Moi, un noir (1958) by Jean Rouch
- Le Sixième doigt, a film by Henri Duparc.
- Bronx-Barbès by Eliane Delatour released in 2000.
- Mentir Pour Être Parfait by Abraham Arts Entertainment
- Enfer De La Justice by Abraham Arts Entertainment
- Caramel a film by Henri Duparc with Adrienne Koutouan, Fortuné Akakpo.
- Rue Princesse a film by Henri Duparc with Félicité Wouassi, Akissi Delta, Gérard Essomba released in 1993, depicting a neighborhood known for nightlife, music, and prostitutes.
- Danger Permanent a film by Pierre Laba with Michel Bohiri, Michel Gohou, Adrienne Koutouan, Jimmy Danger.
- Un homme pour deux sœurs a film by Marie-Louise Asseu released in 2007, with Bétika, Jimmy Danger, Michel Gohou
- Man from Cocody a film by Christian-Jaque released in 1964, with Jean Marais, Philippe Clay, Robert Dalban, Jacques Morel, Gil Delamare, Maria Grazia Buccela, Nancy Holloway and Liselotte Pulver.
- Le virus, a film by Bleu Brigitte released in December 2007, with Fortuné Akakpo, Fanta Coulibaly, Tatianna de M'C Ensira.

=== Music ===
Abidjan is a turntable for West African music, and a major producer of musical art in Africa. The city attracts the majority of musicians from the Côte d'Ivoire mainly because of its many dance clubs, which allow artists to make their debut and express themselves, record companies and national media. Here are a few examples of the most popular artists to have made their debut in Abidjan: Alpha Blondy, Aïcha Koné, the group Magic System, Meiway, and Tiken Jah Fakoly, as well as Gadji Celi, Chantal Taiba, Nayanka Bell, DJ Arafat. In the 1980s, South African musician Miriam Makeba relocated to Abidjan when she was not allowed back into the country, as did the Congolese singer Tshala Muana.

Since the 1990s, Abidjan has had a significant variety of musical styles being exported throughout Africa and the West. These are Zoblazo, Mapouka, Zouglou and, since 2002, the Coupé-Décalé; the popularity and great variety of these dances make the city a kind of African dance and musical trend capital. The Democratic Republic of the Congo formerly held this title, with rumba, soukous and then ndombolo. Abidjan is also considered the reggae capital of Africa.

Each year, the city organises the following music festivals:

- Abi-Reggae
- Faya Flow
- Les Top d'or.
- Concerto Festival.
- Le Tiercé Gagnant
- The RTI Music Awards.
- Dj Mix Atalakou, organised by RTI Music TV
- International Jazz Festival of Abidjan (FIJA)
- International Festival of Black Music (FIMNA). Organised every two years, alternating with the International Jazz Festival.

=== Media ===
Most mass media in Côte d'Ivoire can be found in Abidjan.

==== Television and radio ====
The National Council for Audio-visual Communication (CNCA) is the regulating authority of audio-visual material in Côte d'Ivoire.

Radiodiffusion Television Ivoirienne (RTI) is the radio and television broadcasting authority for Côte d'Ivoire; it is financed by licence fees, publicity and grants. RTI has four television channels and two radio stations: La Première (non-specialised), TV2, RTI Music TV, RTI Sport TV, Radio Côte d'Ivoire, and Fréquence 2 (non-specialised radio). Radio Jam is a private radio station in Côte d'Ivoire and is most listened to by young people.

With regards to private channels, Tam-Tam TV will be the first International Côte d'Ivoire television channel with headquarters in Abidjan, with other studios in the United States, Italy, France, Asia, the Middle East.

There are also several Ivory Coast TV channels or radio stations available on the Internet: Africahit, Music TV, Abidjan.net TV, Bengueshow, etc.

With the launch in 2015 of DISCOP Africa Abidjan, the city became a hub for TV market professionals from French-speaking Africa.

==== Press ====
At the time of the single-party, a political situation which ruled over the country for 30 years like most other West African countries after independence, only one daily newspaper was distributed throughout the country: Fraternité Matin, from the parliamentary group PDCI-RDA, which was founded by the first president, Félix Houphouët-Boigny. The advent of multiple parties in Côte d'Ivoiret in 1999 can be seen in the proliferation of newspapers and diverse publications, of which the majority is published in Abidjan.

- Daily Publications
  - L'Inter
  - Nord-Sud
  - Fraternité Matin
  - Mo" Papers.
  - Mo" Entertainment
  - Le nouveau réveil
  - Notre Voie
  - Le Front
  - Le National (journal)
  - Le Temps
  - Le Jour
  - Le Patriote
  - Le Matin d'Abidjan
  - Le Courrier d'Abidjan
  - Ivoir'Soir
  - Soir Info
  - 24 heures
- Daily Sports Publications
  - Douze
  - Le Sport
- Weekly Publications
  - Gbich (journal satirique)
  - La Nouvelle République
  - Le Démocrate
  - Top Visage
- Monthly Publications
  - Déclic Magazine*
  - Babi Mams Magazine
  - Amina

==== Internet and digital TV ====
The President, the Prime Minister, the government, and ministers have an official website.

- The web portal Abidjan.net, which is domiciled in California in the U.S., broadcasts information about the city and the country all over the world. In the "global village" organisation, Abidjan has a number of internet-cafés which are increasing exponentially, in 2007, there were 400,000 Internet users.
- The web portal Abidjan24.net, which is domiciled in Abidjan in the Ivory Coast, broadcasts information about the city and the country all over the world.

==== Television channels ====
- There is only one public state-owned channel (RTI), which is also in charge of radio.
- Channel 2 (TV2): in progress.
- Private channels and international radio: undeveloped, non-existent.
- Local radio stations: localised regional nature stations, not accessible out of the country.

=== Festivals and cultural events ===
==== Theatre ====
- The MASA Festival.

==== Dance ====
- Urban Dance Festival.
- Hip-hop is back. The show was on 21 April 2007, and Diam's and Rageman were guests. It took place on two stages at the Las Palmas complex.

==== Fashion ====
Several fashion events are organised in the city each year: "Les Féeries" (The Fairies), the ceremonies for Miss Côte d'Ivoire, Miss Abidjan District, Miss Christmas (for 6- to 11-year-olds) and Miss Awoulaba (very prestigious). Moreover, the Yéhé Fashion Show takes place every year, a celebration of African fashion, and the International Festival of Lingerie and Beauty of Abidjan (FILBA).

Abidjan is also the headquarters for Ivory Coast's clothes designers, renowned for being the best in Africa; including Gilles Touré (designer for Miss Côte d'Ivoire) or even Pathéo.

==== Other ====
- Climbie Beach Festival
- International Cartoon Festival.
- International Comedy Festival (FIRA) organised by Adama Dahico.

== Places of worship ==
St. Paul's Cathedral in Abidjan

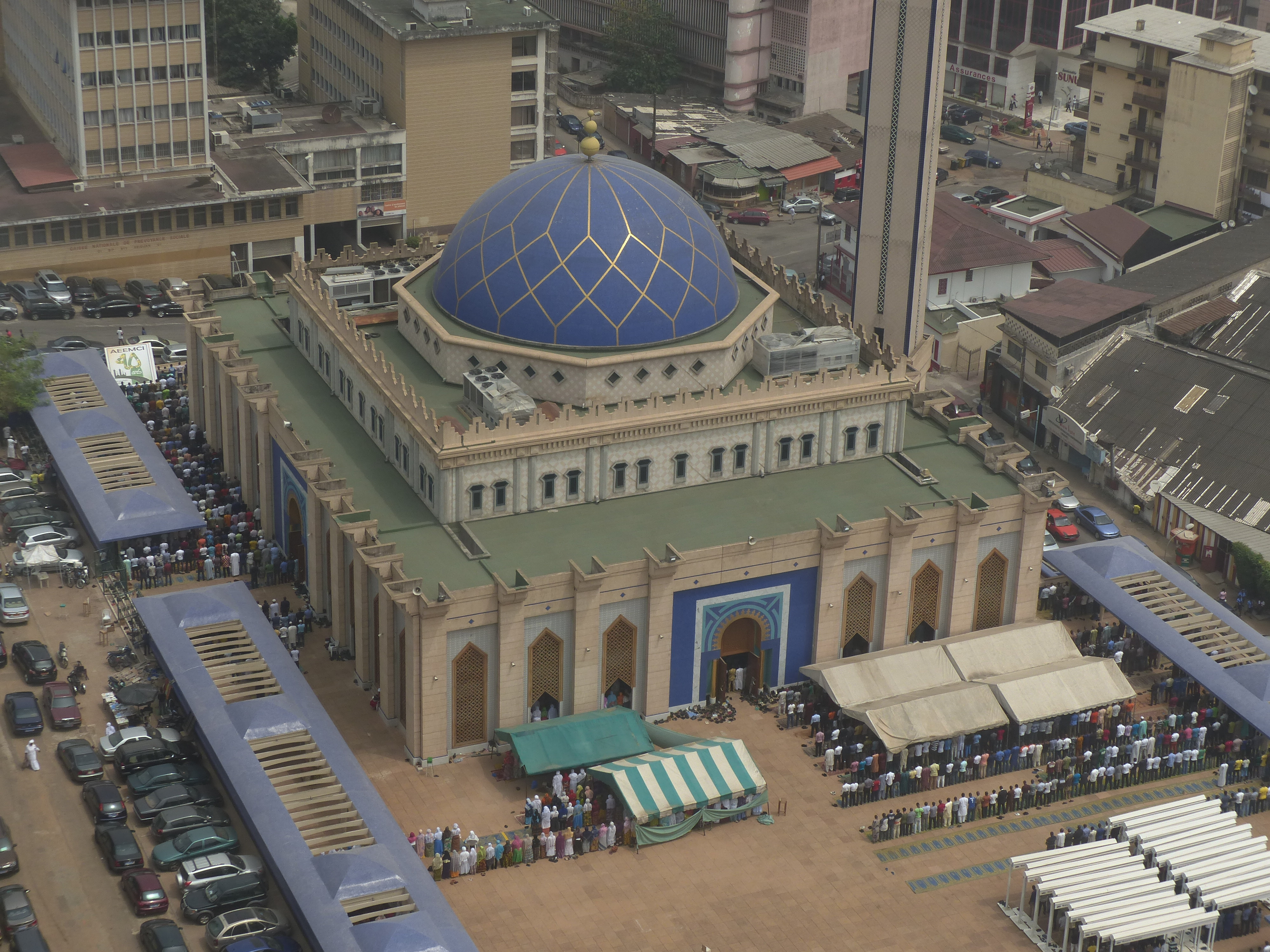
Great Mosque in Abidjan

Among the places of worship, they are predominantly Christian churches and temples : Roman Catholic Archdiocese of Abidjan (Catholic Church), United Methodist Church Ivory Coast (World Methodist Council), Union of Missionary Baptist Churches in Ivory Coast (Baptist World Alliance), Assemblies of God. There are also Muslim mosques. The Church of Jesus Christ of Latter-day Saints has over 100 congregations in the area with a temple that was completed in May 2025.

== Sport ==
Côte d'Ivoire is home to teams from several sports: (basketball, athletics, rugby, handball, volleyball, etc.), soccer is very popular in Abidjan. Abidjan is home to ASEC Mimosas, one of the country's leading football clubs.

=== Football ===
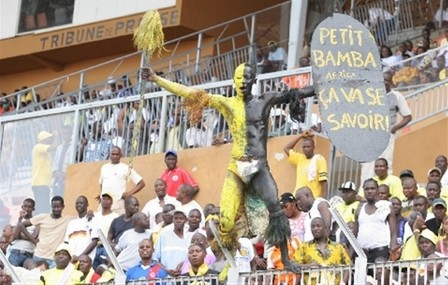
Mimosa Supporters

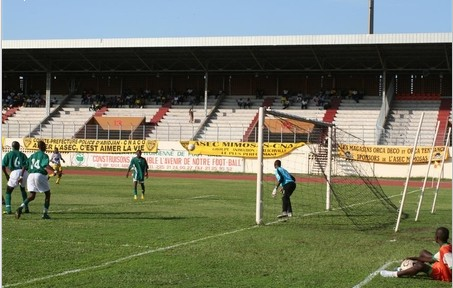
Stade Félix Houphouët-Boigny, nicknamed "le Félicia"

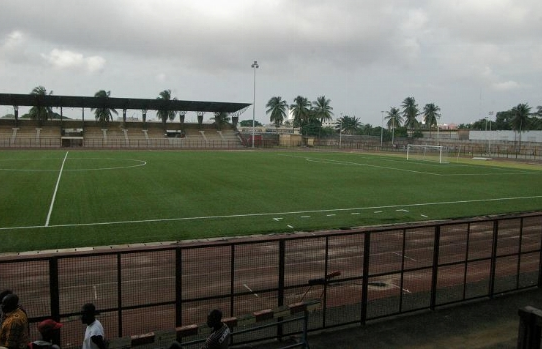
The Stade Robert Champroux after its renovation in 2007

- Ivorian Football Federation
- Professional Clubs

Club	Stadium	Founded in	Titles	Cups	F. H.-B. Cups
ASEC Mimosas	Stade Félix Houphouët-Boigny	1948	22	14	11
Africa Sports	Stade Robert Champroux	1947	14	13	10
Stade d'Abidjan	Stade Municipal d'Abidjan	1936	5	5	1
Stella Club d'Adjamé	Stade Robert Champroux	1953	3	2	2
Jeunesse Abidjan	Stade Robert Champroux	1932		1	
Satellite FC Abidjan	Stade Imam Ali Timité				
EFYM		1997			
Rio-Sports d'Anyama	Parc des sports de Rio	1990			

- Each year a 7-a-side football tournament is organised: the Festival of Maracana d'Abidjan (FESTMA) which takes place in Yopougon.
- Following the undeniable success of the "Football Academy" created by Jean-Marc Guillou (Académie Sol Béni), from which several old members have rejoined professional European clubs, several football training centres for young footballers have developed in recent years: the Cyril Domoraud Centre, Labo foot in Yopougon, the Centre ivoirien de formation de football d'Abidjan (CIFFA), l'Étoile Scientifique Football Abidjan (ESFA), etc.

Events:

In 1964, the Jeux d'Abidjan took place in Abidjan, as did the final of the African Cup Winners' Cup in 1975, 1980, 1983, and 1990, then another in 1992 under the name of CAF Confederations Cup. The Stade Félix Houphouët-Boigny was the host of the very first African Super Cup in 1992, and the second in 1998. The finals of the 1966, 1986, 1995, and 1998 CAF Champions League also took place in Abidjan.

The main football event organised in Abidjan was the 1984 African Cup of Nations and one of the finals of the 1983 African Youth Cup of Nations.

The economic capital also attracted other football events such as the Assumption Tournament (the first one taking place in 2007 in the Stade Robert Champroux), the West African Club Championship (UFOA Cup), and international gala matches.

=== Other sports ===
Basketball

- Côte d'Ivoire Basketball Federation
- Clubs : Abidjan Basket Club, Club sportif Abidjanais, ASEC Mimosas, Phénix Basket Club de Cocody and Génération Basket-ball Club (GBC) which is a new club of young volunteers who want to become basketball players.

Rugby

- Côte d'IvoireRugby Federation
- Clubs : Abidjan University Club, Treichville Biafra Olympic

Abidjan is the centre of Ivorian rugby, and most of the Côte d'Ivoiret national rugby union team come from here. Although the origins of Ivorian rugby go back to the 1960s and earlier, French official Jean-François Turon managed the team at Abidjan University in the 1980s, but it was François Dali who created Ivorian rugby, and his son was the national captain during the 1990s.

Cycling

- Côte d'Ivoire Cycling Federation
- Clubs : ASFA Moossou, Club cycliste d'Azagui, AS Cavel de Koumassi, Cycliste club de l'océan, and the Club cycliste de Yopougon

Tennis

- Côte d'Ivoire Tennis which organised the first International Tennis tournament CEDEAO in 2007
- Clubs : Seamen's Club, SGBCI Tennis Club, Tennis Club Hotel Ivoire, Sporting Club 2 Plateaux, Palm Club Abidjan Tennis, and the Lycée technique Abidjan Tennis Club

Judo

- Côte d'Ivoire Federation of Judo and Related Disciplines which organised the 15th Abidjan Tournament in 2007'.

Athletics

- Côte d'Ivoire Athletics Federation.
- Clubs : Club d'Attécoubé and Club de Yopougon

Boxing

- Club : SOA Boxing Club d'Abidjan

Golf

- Côte d'Ivoire Golf Federation
- Club: Ivoire Golf Club

=== Facilities ===
- Stadiums : Alassane Ouattara Stadium, Stade INJS, Stade Municipal d'Abidjan, Stade Municipal de Man FC, Stade Félix Houphouët-Boigny, Parc des Sports de Treichville, Stade Robert Champroux, Stade du Port autonome d'Abidjan.
- Other facilities: Omnisport Palace in Treichville
- Olympic Complex: with 80,000 to 100,000 seats is being planned, thanks to the Ivorian managers' desire to provide the "Elephants" with a better national stadium. The complex will have, in addition to areas for all different Olympic disciplines (football, athletics, swimming, etc.), restaurants, shops, auditoriums, conference rooms, a hotel for the sportspeople, and training areas. Since the sudden increase in Ivorian football, the government believes that the national team deserves a better stadium. Although, there was a problem with the "Félicia": it is impossible to increase its size due to its location in Le Plateau. The project for the new complex was suspended as of 2011 because of a lack of investors and the political situation which the country has been experiencing since December 1999.
