= Anderson Lago Zeze =

Ivorian footballer (born 1989)

Anderson Zeze
Personal information
- Full name: Anderson Lago Zeze
- Date of birth: 13 July 1989 (age 37)
- Place of birth: Abidjan, Côte d'Ivoire
- Height: 1.72 m (5 ft 7 1/2 in)
- Positions: Midfielder; winger

Youth career
- Académie de Sol Beni

Senior career*
Years	Team	Apps	(Gls)
2008–2010	SK Kladno	1	(0)
2010	→ SK Střešovice (loan)		
2010–2011	FK Viktoria Žižkov		
2011–2014	CD Laudio		
- * Club domestic league appearances and goals

Anderson Lago Zeze (born 13 July 1989) is an Ivorian footballer who plays as a midfielder and can be used as a winger .

== Career ==
Zeze began his career with the Académie de Sol Beni the youth academy of ASEC Mimosas and signed on 1 August 2008 a contract for SK Kladno, his first professional game was on 28 October 2008 against 1. FC Brno of the Gambrinus liga, the top league in the Czech Republic.

== International ==
In 2008 Zeze was called up to a training camp with the Côte d'Ivoire under-20 national
