= French people in Ivory Coast =

French Ivorians are those who were born in or reside in Ivory Coast, who descend from French community. There was a small but prominent French community in Ivory Coast until 2002, when a failed coup d'état and civil war led to anti-French riots. Of the 20,000 living in the country at the start of the conflict, by 2004 only 15,000 remained.

== Population graph ==
Year	White population	% of pop.
1960	30,000	.9%
1980	60,000	.7%
2002	20,000	.1%
2004	15,000	.09%

== Notable people ==
- Dominique Ouattara (born 1954), current First Lady of Ivory Coast (2011-present)
