= Institut National de la Statistique de Côte d'Ivoire =

Ivory Coast's principal government institution in charge of statistics and census data

The Institut National de la Statistique de Côte d'Ivoire is a national institute of Côte d'Ivoire which is dedicated to collecting statistical data on demographics, population, climatology, industry, tourism, education, employment, etc...
