= Étienne Mougeotte =

French journalist (1940–2021)

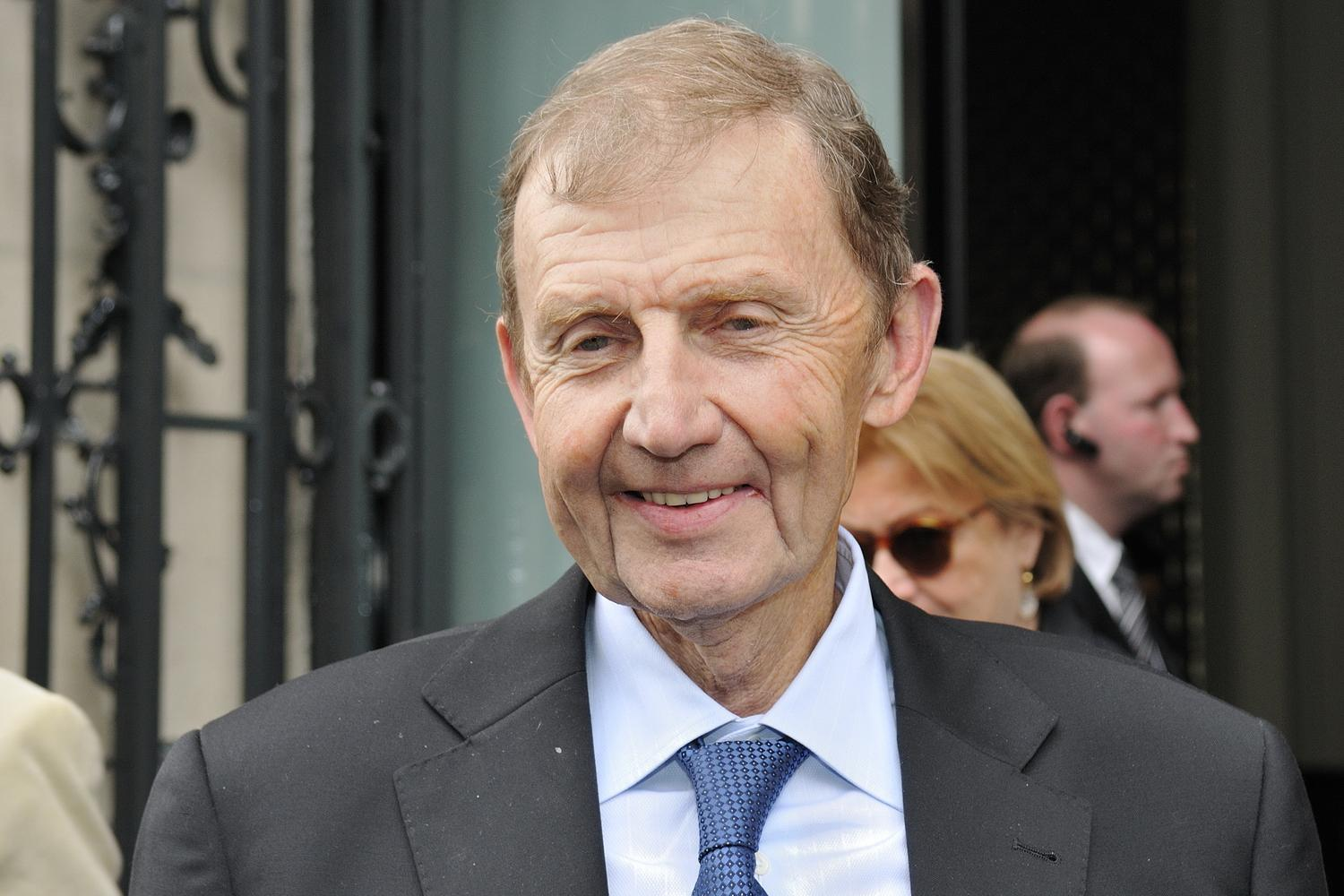
- Mougeotte in 2009
- Born: 4 March 1940; La Rochefoucauld, France
- Died: 7 October 2021 (aged 81); Paris, France
- Education: Lycée Henri-IV
- Alma mater: Sciences Po; French Press Institute
- Occupation: Journalist
- Known for: Vice-president of TF1 (1989–2008)

Étienne Mougeotte (4 March 1940 – 7 October 2021) was a French journalist and media director. During his fifty-year career, he served as Vice-President of TF1 Group and was satellite director of TF1 from 1987 to 2007 alongside Patrick Le Lay. He directed the editorial staff at Le Figaro from 2008 to 2012 and was Director-General of Radio Classique from 2012 to 2018. From 2015 to 2020, he was President of Groupe Valmonde, including the magazine Valeurs actuelles.

== Biography ==
=== Youth and studies ===
Mougeotte was born in La Rochefoucauld on 4 March 1940, during the Phoney War. His father worked as an inspector for SNCF and his mother was a housewife in Charente. His father died when he was 18, which compelled his mother to start working. He was a khâgne student at the Lycée Henri-IV, which prepared him to attend Sciences Po, where he became Vice-President of the Union Nationale des Étudiants de France. He was opposed to President Charles de Gaulle while maintaining an anti-Marxist stance. While a student, he spent his time playing basketball alongside Lionel Jospin. He finished his studies at the French Press Institute.

=== Early career ===
Mougeotte began his career with Paris-Normandie before joining France Inter as a reporter and correspondent in Beirut. During his time in Lebanon, he often interacted with Lebanese radio. He notably covered the Six-Day War for France Inter. He then worked as a newspaper editor for Europe 1 during May 68. In 1969, he joined the Office de Radiodiffusion Télévision Française (ORTF), presented the newscast Information Première with Philippe Gildas. From 1972 to 1973, he worked for RTL before returning to Europe 1 in 1974, where he became editor and news director until 1981.

=== TF1 ===
In 1987, Mougeotte joined TF1, which had just been purchased by Bouygues. He quickly became Vice=President of TF1 Group and became antenna director of TF1 in 1989. In 1987, he was diagnosed with throat cancer, which he recovered from, but left lasting effects on his voice. He and Patrick Le Lay were credited with the group's success in the 1990s and 2000s. He was responsible for hiring multiple personalities who became prominent news anchors, such as Nikos Aliagas, Arthur, Christophe Dechavanne, and Jean-Luc Reichmann. Several successful programs also took off under Mougeotte's leadership, such as Ciel, mon mardi !, À prendre ou à laisser, Qui veut gagner des millions ?, and others. He received great renown for his journalistic and professional skills.

Mougeotte also served as President of La Chaîne Info, the non-stop news channel of the TF1 Group, from 1994 to 2007. In 2006, he became Vice-President of France 24.

=== Later career ===
Mougeotte left TF1 in 2007 to become a communications consultant. However, he remained an adviser to TF1 Group CEO Nonce Paolini, who replaced Patrick Le Lay. In August 2007, he began working for Le Figaro Magazine and became editorial director of the Le Figaro group in November of that year, replacing Nicolas Beytout. On 2 December 2007, he joined the team of interviewers on Le Grand Jury. In 2012, he took part in the group with supported re-election for President Nicolas Sarkozy. In July 2012, he left his post as editorial director of Le Figaro and was replaced by Alexis Brézet. That month, he briefly worked as a consultant for TVous.

On 12 December 2012, Mougeotte was appointed general manager of Radio Classique, a position he held until 1 March 2018. In 2015, with Iskandar Safa and Charles Villeneuve, he purchased Groupe Valmonde from Laboratoires Pierre Fabre, which the right-wing weekly magazine Valeurs contemporaine was a part of.

=== Political opinions ===
In his youth, Mougeotte was firmly committed to the left and was briefly suspended from the ORTF for this reason. He broke from the left following the signing of the Programme commun in 1972 and became a supporter of President Valéry Giscard d'Estaing. He was ousted from Europe 1 following the victory of François Mitterrand in 1981. During his time as Vice-President of TF1, the channel leaned to the right and supported Nicolas Sarkozy in 2007. In 2012, Le HuffPost considered him a right-wing journalist, and François Hollande refused any interview with Le Figaro during the 2012 French presidential election, and would have demanded his departure from the newspaper.

=== Other activities ===
Mougeotte briefly worked as an associate professor of journalism at Sciences Po.

=== Death ===
Mougeotte died of tonsil cancer in Paris at the age of 81 on 7 October 2021. His funeral was celebrated on 13 October at Saint-François-Xavier, Paris.

== Publication ==
- Pouvoirs (2021)
