= North West London Hospitals NHS Trust =

- Type: NHS hospital trust
- Hospitals: Northwick Park Hospital; St Mark's Hospital; Central Middlesex Hospital
- Staff: 4300

North West London Hospitals NHS Trust was an NHS trust that ran Northwick Park Hospital and St Mark's Hospital in Harrow and Central Middlesex Hospital, Park Royal, London, England. In October 2014, the trust merged with Ealing Hospital NHS Trust to become London North West Healthcare NHS Trust.

In May 2013 Moorfields Hospital opened a satellite Eye Centre at Northwick Park meaning that patients could access their specialist services without having to travel to Moorfields.

In October 2013 the Trust had to apologise when it was discovered that 822 patients on the waiting list for elected procedures had not been dealt with within the 18-week target.

In November 2013 it emerged that waiting times for 2,700 elective patients had been improperly recorded at the Trust. A report said: “There was a culture where some staff felt under pressure to stop patients’ clocks prematurely.”

The Trust has been at the centre of proposals for reconfiguration for some years, with suggestions that hospitals in north west London "will almost certainly" have to close. In the area it is said "there are more hospitals per head of population, more hospital beds per head of population and travel time to a local hospital is much shorter than anywhere else in the country".

== See also ==
- List of NHS trusts
