= Ashgabat Cable Car =

Cableway near Ashgabat, Turkmenistan

Coordinates: 37°50′02″N 58°18′35″E

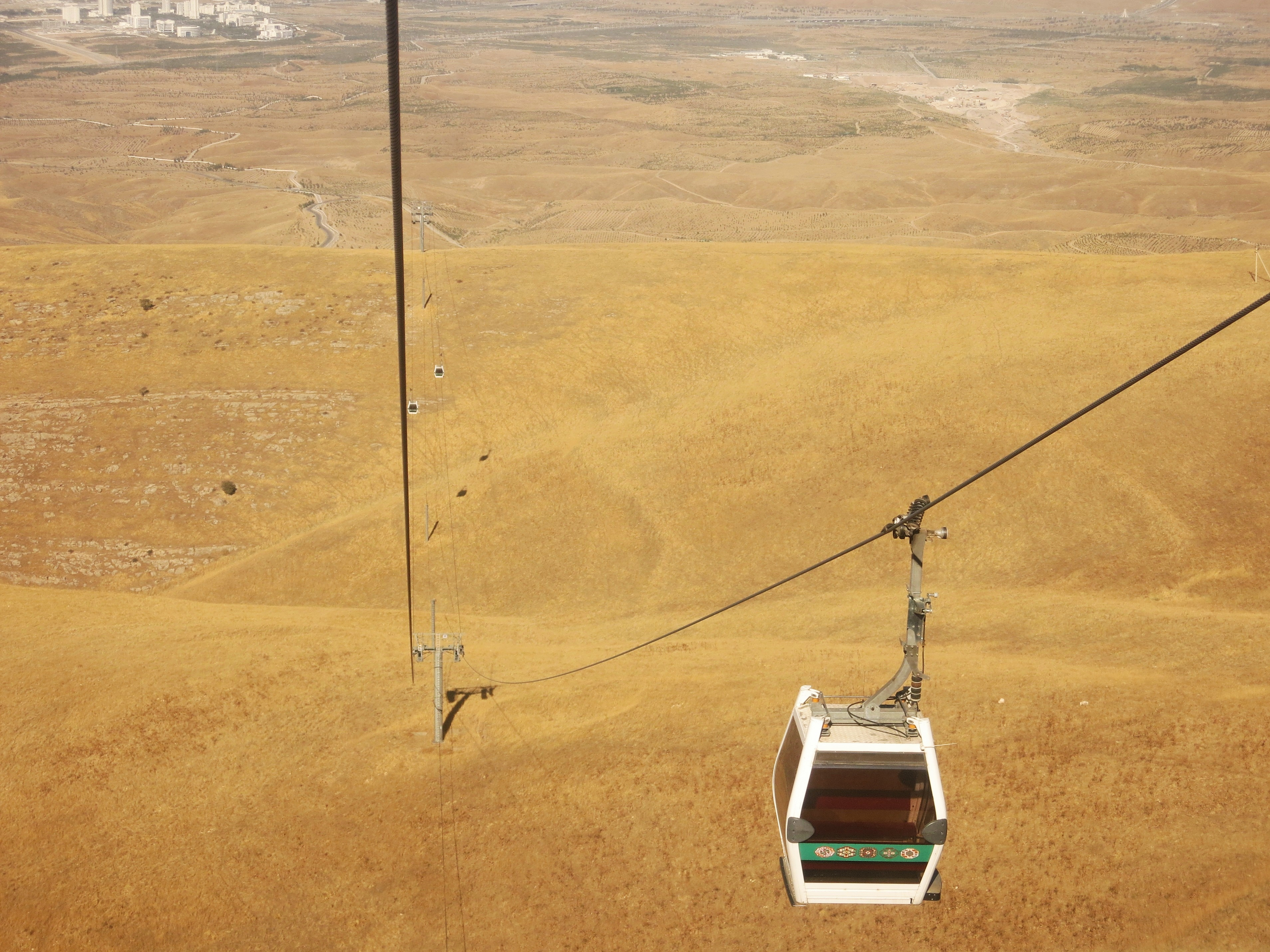
- Interactive map of Ashgabat Cable Car

Overview
- Status: Operational
- Location: Ashgabat, Turkmenistan
- Termini: Ashgabat; Kopetdag
- Elevation: lowest: 1,270 m (4,170 ft)
- No. of stations: 2
- Open: 18 October 2006

Technical features
- Aerial lift type: Aerial tramway
- Line length: 4 km (2.5 mi)
- Operating speed: 6 m/s (13 mph)

Ashgabat Cable Car (Turkmen: Türkmenbaşynyň Asma ýoly) is a 4 km (2.5 mi) cableway between Ashgabat and the foothills of the Kopetdag. The cableway is the first and only cable car in Turkmenistan. Construction was finished on 18 October 2006.

== History ==
Construction was started in 2005 by the French company Bouygues for $20.5 million, on the order of the Turkmenenergogurlushyk concern of the Ministry of Energy and Industry of Turkmenistan.

The cable car was inaugurated on 18 October 2006 with the participation of the President of Turkmenistan Saparmurat Niyazov and the head of Bouygues Martin Bouygues.

Since January 2025, Röwşen Private Enterprise has been carrying out major renovations of the buildings and facilities of the Ashgabat Cable Car, as well as the surrounding areas. The project is scheduled to be fully operational by June 2026.

== Specification ==
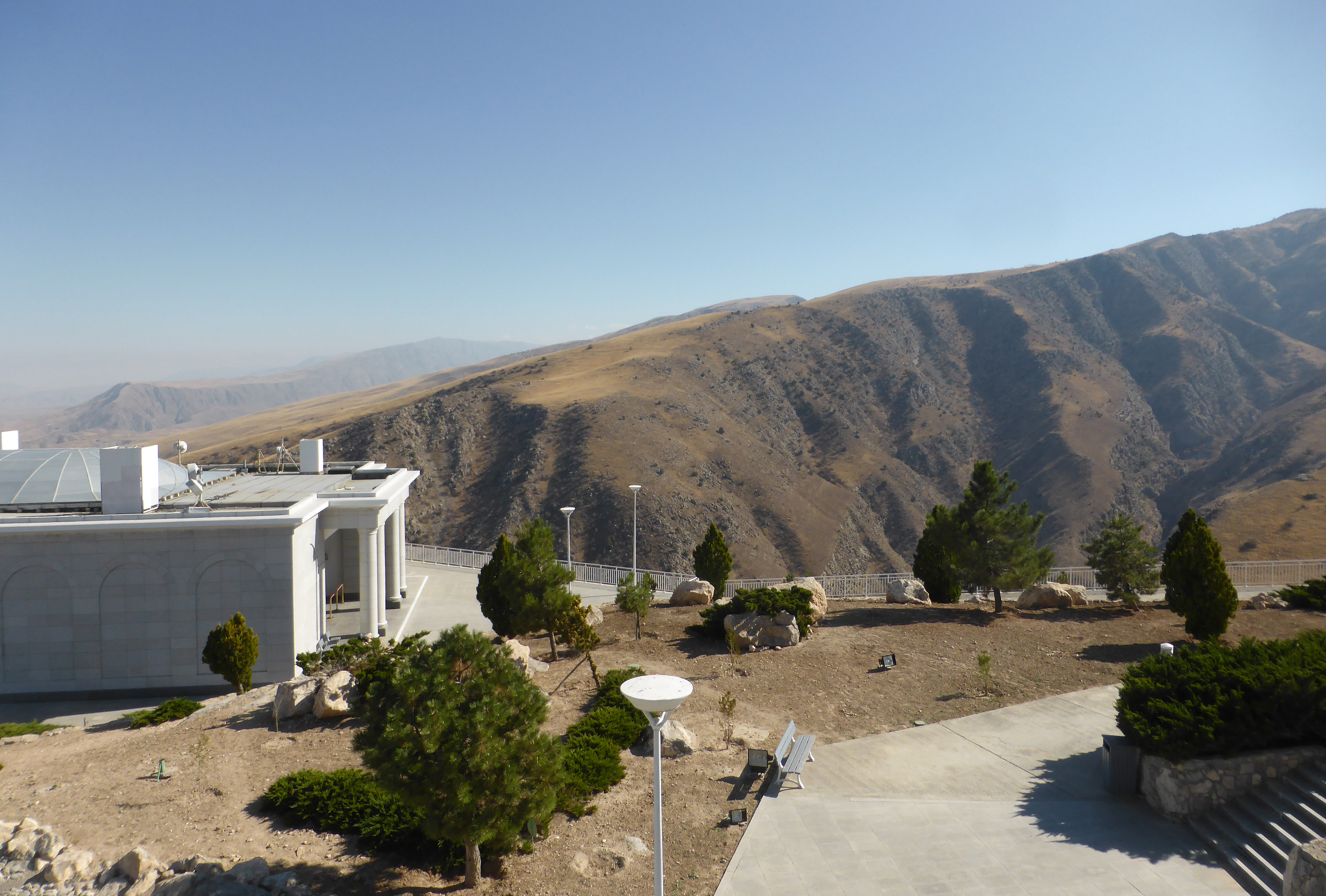
Ashgabat Cable Car restaurant

Each of the 14 cabins can accommodate 8 people and moves at 6 meters per second. Passengers are carried out every 72 seconds, with a journey time of 10 minutes over the 4 km length.

The sending station is located south of the Main Museum of Turkmenistan at an altitude of 1,270 metres (4,170 feet) above sea level. The station has a waiting room and ticket office, facilities for technical services, and equipment. On an area of 6,500 square metres (70,000 square feet) is a small park equipped with parking for 100 cars and 5 buses. In addition to the arrival station, a constructed building with a total area of over 1,000 square metres (11,000 square feet), which houses two restaurants and cafes, which both can take 280 people, and several shops and offices for staff. The neighborhood set up a sightseeing helicopter pad, covered terraces and stairways, alleys, and a water cascade length of 80 metres (260 feet).

On the mountain accessible by the cable car, several telescopes have been installed for observing the surroundings.
