= Patrick Le Lay =

French engineer (1946–2020)

- Born: 7 June 1942; Saint-Brieuc, France
- Died: 18 March 2020 (aged 77); Neuilly-sur-Seine, France
- Education: ESTP Paris; HEC Paris (MBA)
- Occupation: President of TF1 (1988-2008)

Patrick Le Lay (7 June 1942 – 18 March 2020) was a French engineer who served as Director of TF1 from 1988 to 2008.

== Biography ==
Patrick was the son of engineer Jean Le Lay and Gabrielle Colin. The Le Lay family lived in Plénet during World War II. However, one of their hosts, Lola Drucker, was arrested by the Gestapo, but Le Lay's fluency in German helped to save her and her family. He studied at the Lycée Saint-Vincent de Rennes, the École Spéciale des Travaux Publics, and the HEC Paris.

Le Lay married Claudine Sénécal on 12 November 1966, with whom he had two children: Laurent-Éric and Anne-Vefa. His second marriage was to Dominique Polette.

A public works engineer, Le Lay worked for several construction companies before Bouygues in 1981. It was with this corporation that Le Lay aided in the privatization of television channel TF1, as per the will of Francis Bouygues. He was vice-president of TF1 during the privatization in April 1987, and he succeeded Francis Bouygues as president and managing director on 11 October 1988. Under his direction, the television channel became one of the leaders in Europe. Le Lay signed a contract with Endemol in 2001 to buy all reality shows previously aired by the media company. On 22 May 2007, he relinquished his title of managing director to Nonce Paolini. In November 2007, Le Lay won an Emmy Award for Best Television Director. On 27 July 2008, he announced that he would gradually leave TF1. On 31 July 2008, he resigned as CEO, leaving the job to Nonce Paolini. His salary as CEO in 2008 was estimated at €1,930,000. In July 2012, he was tried in Nanterre for an excessive use of fixed-term contracts as CEO of TF1, and was fined €7500.

After leaving TF1, Le Lay chaired the investment fund Serendipity, of which the main shareholders are Groupe Artémis and Bouygues. In January 2010, he was removed from his position at Serendipity by Martin Bouygues, the final move in a long series of steps by the Bouygues family to rid Le Lay of positions of power among their assets.

On 7 May 2010, Le Lay was appointed as President of Stade Rennais F.C. by François Pinault, replacing Frédéric de Saint-Sernin, who had resigned for health reasons. On 25 June 2012, he left this position and was replaced by de Saint-Sernin.

Patrick Le Lay died on 18 March 2020 at the age of 77.

== Decorations ==
- Commander of the Legion of Honour (2008). He earned Knight on 31 December 1993, Officer on 31 December 2002, and finally Commander on 21 March 2008.
