= Edward Bouygues =

French businessman (born 1984)

Edward Bouygues (born April 14, 1984) is a French businessman and the eldest son of Martin Bouygues.

== Biography ==
=== Childhood and education ===
Bouygues was born on April 14, 1984. He studied at the École Supérieure des Sciences Commerciales d'Angers and at the London Business School. His parents are Martin Bouygues and Melissa Bouygues.

=== Career ===
He joined his family business in 2014 after completing his studies. In 2016, he became a member of the group's Board of Directors at the request of his father, Martin Bouygues. His appointment received 89.76% of the votes in his favour at the shareholders' general meeting.

In 2019, at the age of 34, Bouygues was appointed Director of Strategy on the executive committee of Bouygues Telecom.^{,}

In 2021, he became Deputy CEO of the Bouygues Group, working alongside Pascal Grangé, and Chairman of Bouygues Europe. He was previously Vice President of the telecom operator Bouygues Telecom.

In 2022, he was appointed as Chairman of Bouygues Telecom.^{,} On May 21, 2022, he married Maria de la Orden, a Spanish designer.
