= Douglas Cameron (broadcaster) =

British broadcaster and newsreader (born 1933)

Douglas Cameron MBE
- Born: 29 October 1933 (age 92); Scotland
- Occupation: Radio presenter
- Known for: AM programme (LBC)
- Spouse: Marjorie Peat
- Children: 2
- Awards: Radio Academy Hall of Fame 2003; Roll of Honour of Radio's All Time Greats 1988; UK Radio Personality of the Year 1987; Independent Radio Personality of the Year by the Variety Club 1979 & 1984

Douglas Cameron (born 29 October 1933) is a British broadcaster and newsreader who for over 30 years broadcast on LBC, most notably on the breakfast programme with co-presenter Bob Holness in the 1980s. Cameron's radio awards include induction into the Radio Academy Hall of Fame in recognition of his 42-year broadcasting career.

== Early life ==
Cameron was born in Scotland, and worked as an accountant in Edinburgh, before starting out in broadcasting.

== Career ==
In 1961, Cameron began his broadcasting career in Scotland as a regular contributor to Scotsport then after a year became a continuity announcer and newsreader with STV. In February 1962, he formed one of STV's first news-reading trios, alongside Michael O'Halloran and Raymond Boyd, and unlike their contemporaries of the time, they read the news from printed scripts, rather than Autocue.

Cameron left STV in 1964 and joined the BBC in London as a network announcer. He also presented schools and further education programmes during this time. In 1968 Cameron became a newsreader on Radio 4's nightly news opt-out programme South-East, before joining the Today programme in 1971, alongside co-presenters Jack de Manio and John Timpson.

Meanwhile, commercial radio was being launched. Today editor, Marshall Stewart, moved to LBC and Cameron soon joined him, leaving the BBC in 1974 to join Independent Radio News (IRN) as a newsreader and sub-editor. He became IRN's principal morning newsreader, before he moved to co-present LBC's flagship breakfast show, the AM Programme, firstly with Allen MacKenzie and then Clive Roslin. Bob Holness delivered the travel and traffic reports from Helicopter 417 before moving to co-present the AM Programme with Cameron in 1975, a partnership that would last for 10 years.

At the time, the AM programme ran from 6am to 10am and was the only four-hour news breakfast show in Europe. By the early 1980s the programme was bringing in 2 million listeners and was more popular in the capital than Radio 4's Today programme. The breakfast show was designed to become lighter as it passed through the morning. Cameron put the success of AM down to the light and shade of hard news combined with everyday features such as medical and cooking segments. On 7 June 1985, Holness left the AM programme and he was replaced by Peter Deeley who moved from weekends. Cameron later appeared on Holness' This Is Your Life.

In 1989, LBC split into two frequencies; LBC Crown FM and London Talkback Radio on AM. Cameron co-presented the breakfast programme with Bob Wellings on London Talkback. The new station employed a number of celebrities to present new programmes, with Cameron later remarking, "If people like that bring in money at the box office, then they are worth every penny. But they didn't with us." By 1992, Douglas Cameron's Breakfast Call, which ran from 5.30am to 9am, was attracting 230,000 listeners.

London Talkback relaunched as London News Talk 1152 in October 1994 and Cameron co-presented the breakfast show with Brian Hayes. On the subject of talk-radio shock jocks, Cameron was quoted as saying "They should remember they're there for the listeners, not to gratify their own egos." The pairing with Hayes did not last and, by the autumn of 1995, Cameron was presenting the early breakfast programme, Dawn Call from 5am to 7am. Throughout this period, he would refer to the station on air as LBC News Talk in an attempt to keep the LBC name alive.

LBC was relaunched on 1152AM in July 1996 and Cameron was moved to host the drivetime programme with Clare Catford, nightly from 5pm to 8pm. By summer 1997, he was hosting the drivetime programme solo between 4pm and 7pm and was drawing close to half a million listeners, the loyalty of which he put down to "fighting their battles for them. We are their unelected representatives." In March 1999, Cameron moved to present News at One, a daily one-hourly lunchtime programme. However, by October of the same year he had returned to reading news bulletins. Cameron announced his retirement from regular broadcasting in November 2003.

Cameron is known for his voice being "dark, steely and with a nasal buzz that was almost Antipodean" He described his broadcasting style as "a little old-fashioned", and that "I've always believed in the autocratic approach. If people make a dreadful point I say, 'Valueless, cheerio'."

As part of LBC's 30th anniversary in 2003, Holness and Cameron reunited on LBC News 1152 to present a one-off two-hour breakfast show on 2 September between 8 and 10am. In October 2013, Cameron made a one-off return to the airwaves, reading the 8am news bulletin on Nick Ferrari's LBC 97.3 breakfast programme in celebration of LBC's 40 years on air.

== Personal life ==
Cameron lived in Bearsden before embarking on a career in broadcasting. He moved to London in 1964, initially settling in Kenton with his wife Marjorie (née Peat), a former singer and radiographer, before moving to Northwood in 1973. The couple have a son, Michael (born c. 1965), and a daughter, Judith Rose (born c. 1968).

Cameron has been involved in local events, such as presenting awards, hospital open days, opening fetes and commentating on the Hillingdon half-marathon. He made a guest broadcast on Northwick Park's hospital radio station, Radio Northwick, in 1972 on a visit to see friend Alfie Bass.

== Honours ==
Cameron was awarded the Independent Radio Personality of the Year by the Variety Club in 1979 and 1984, and a Sony award for UK Radio Personality of the Year in 1987. This was the first time it had been awarded to an independent radio broadcaster. The following year, in 1988, he was listed on Sony's Roll of Honour of Radio's All Time Greats.

In January 1999, Cameron received an MBE for services to radio. In 2003, after announcing his retirement, Cameron received an induction into the Radio Academy Hall of Fame in recognition of his 42-year broadcasting career.
