= Nonce Paolini =

French business executive

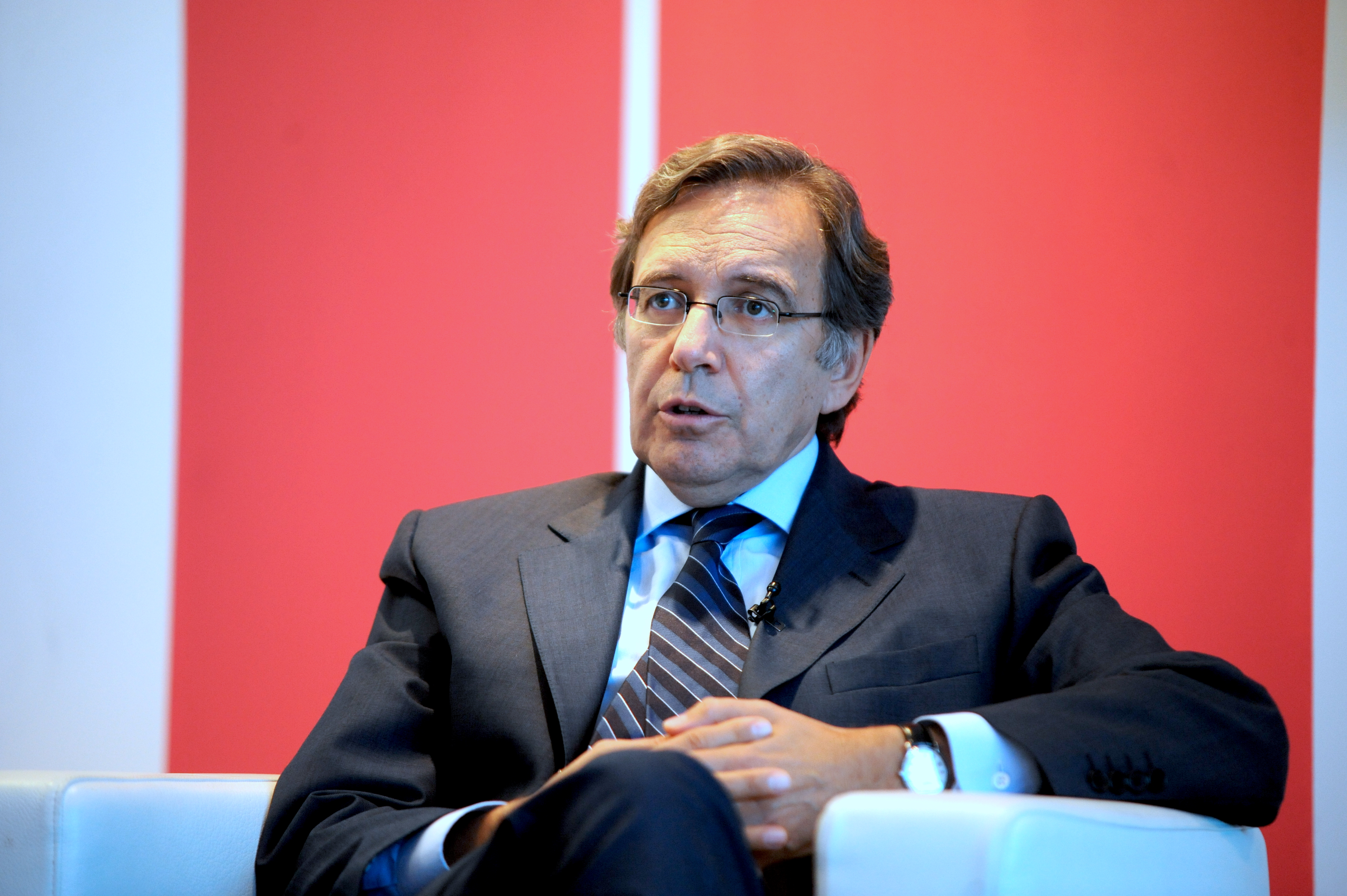
- Paolini in 2010 Paris
- Born: April 1, 1949; Ivry-sur-Seine, France
- Died: July 17, 2024 (aged 75); Paris, France
- Education: Paris Institute of Political Studies
- Occupation: Business executive
- Known for: Former chairman of French media company TF1 Group
- Spouse: Catherine Falgayrac (third wife)
- Children: 3
- Awards: Legion of Honour

Nonce Paolini (April 1, 1949 - July 17, 2024) was a French business executive. He was the director general and then chairman of French media company TF1 Group (the Bouygues Group being the main shareholder). He left this position in February 2016 and was succeeded by Gilles Pélisson.

He had previously served as the deputy general manager of Bouygues Telecom, France's third largest mobile phone operator and a subsidiary of the Bouygues Group.

== Early life and education ==
Paolini's family is originally from Nice. He attended Lycée Montaigne (Paris), holds a Master's degree in literature, and graduated from the Institut d'études politiques de Paris (class of 1972).

== Career ==
He began his professional career at public companies Électricité de France (EDF) and Gaz de France (GDF), where he held various responsibilities.

In 1988, he joined the French industrial group Bouygues, where he became director of human resources, and in 1990, director of external communications. In July 1993, he became the group's human relations director for TF1 Group. From 1999 to 2001, he held the positions of internal communication director and deputy general manager of the group, which was built around TF1, a commercial terrestrial television channel privatized in 1987.

In January 2002, he joined Bouygues Telecom, the telecommunications operator and subsidiary of the Bouygues Group, to become its deputy general manager. In April 2004, he became Bouygues Telecom's managing director and administrator.

From July 2002 to March 2005, Paolini chaired the association Médiation Télécom (AMET), an organization mediating between clients and landline and mobile phone operators.

On February 20, 2007, Patrick Le Lay proposed to separate the roles of president (which he would keep) and general manager of the group, assigning it to someone else. On May 22 following, Paolini was named general manager of the TF1 Group by its board of directors. Étienne Mougeotte, then vice-president of TF1, had to leave his role as director of the group's broadcast and program divisions in August.

On July 31, 2008, Paolini was appointed president-director general of the TF1 Group, replacing Patrick Le Lay who left the presidency while keeping his position as an administrator. He took office on August 25. In this capacity, his annual salary was made public by TF1 and amounted to €1,300,000 in 2008.

In 2015, he was often cited in the media for having dismissed Claire Chazal, who presented TF1's weekend news programs for 24 years.

On February 17, 2016, Paolini stepped down in favor of Gilles Pélisson.

In May 2022, he spoke out to denounce the actions of TF1's star presenter, Patrick Poivre d'Arvor, defending himself against a charge of covering up a system of sexual violence.

== Private life ==
He is married for the third time to Catherine Falgayrac, one of the presenters of the show Téléshopping on TF1, and has three daughters from two previous unions.

== Decorations ==
- Chevalier de la Légion d'honneur (13 July 2007). Nominated under the jurisdiction of the Ministry of Economy and Finance.
