= RNP =

RNP may refer to:

== Medicine ==
- Ribonucleoprotein, a compound of ribonucleic acid and protein
- Ribonucleoprotein particle, intracellular compartments involved in post-transcriptional fate
- Registered nurse practitioner

== Military ==
- Royal Navy Police, in the United Kingdom

== Other ==
- Rede Nacional de Ensino e Pesquisa, the academic Internet system of Brazil
- Required navigation performance for a specific procedure or block of airspace
- Rosa nel Pugno (RnP), or Rose in the Fist, a former Italian political federation around 2006
- Radio Northwick Park, a London hospital radio station
- Owosso Community Airport, Michigan, US, IATA code
- Radon–Nikodym property, in mathematics, a property of some Banach spaces, related to integration and differentiability
- Rassemblement National Populaire, a French fascist party active during World War Two
