= Odile Benyahia-Kouider =

French journalist

Odile Benyahia-Kouider (born May 13, 1966, in Bourges, France) is a journalist and author. Currently she is one of the main contributors of the French weekly Le Nouvel Observateur.

== Biography ==
Odile Benyahia-Kouider studied "hypokhâgne" studies at the Hélène Boucher College. She then obtained a degree in specialized modern literature at the University of Sorbonne Paris IV in 1988 before pursuing her studies in journalism at the École supérieure de journalisme de Lille (ESJ), where she graduated in 1990. Her career as a journalist began in 1990 within the Media service of the French daily Libération. Later on, at 29 years of age, she became chief of the media and television pages. In 1998, she was responsible for the finance department at Libération, where she writes about the war between banks (BNP Paribas, Société Générale). From 2001 to 2006, she was a correspondent for Libération in Berlin. This is where she got the opportunity to write about politics as well as economics and culture.

She returned to Paris after the FIFA World Cup in 2006. She left Libération a few months after its founder, Serge July, was ousted by Edouard de Rothschild. She was then hired by the business magazine Challenges as associate editor, responsible for the industry and finance sectors. In 2008, Le Nouvel Observateur appointed her initially as one of its main reporters within the economy department, then as an investigative reporter. She publishes numerous portraits of big business leaders including Martin Bouygues, Serge Dassault, Arnaud Lagardère, Michel-Edouard Leclerc, and Maurice Lévy. She also continues to publish articles about the developments in Germany.

She is the author of Un si petit monde (such a small world), published in 2011. The narrative tells the story of the takeover of the newspaper Le Monde by a trio of businessmen : Pierre Bergé, Xavier Niel and Matthieu Pigasse. For L’Allemagne paiera (Germany will pay), a trip to the country of Angela Merkel, she received the award “Prix du Meilleur Livre Économique” for best economics book in 2013 as well as the "Ailleurs" prize.

She is married to the lawyer, university professor and specialist in constitutional law Olivier Beaud.

== Bibliography ==
- "Un si petit monde" - Fayard, 2011.
- "L'Allemagne paiera" - Fayard, 2013. Prize for best economics book.
