= Ealing Hospital =

Coordinates: 51°30′25″N 0°20′44″W

- London North West University Healthcare NHS Trust
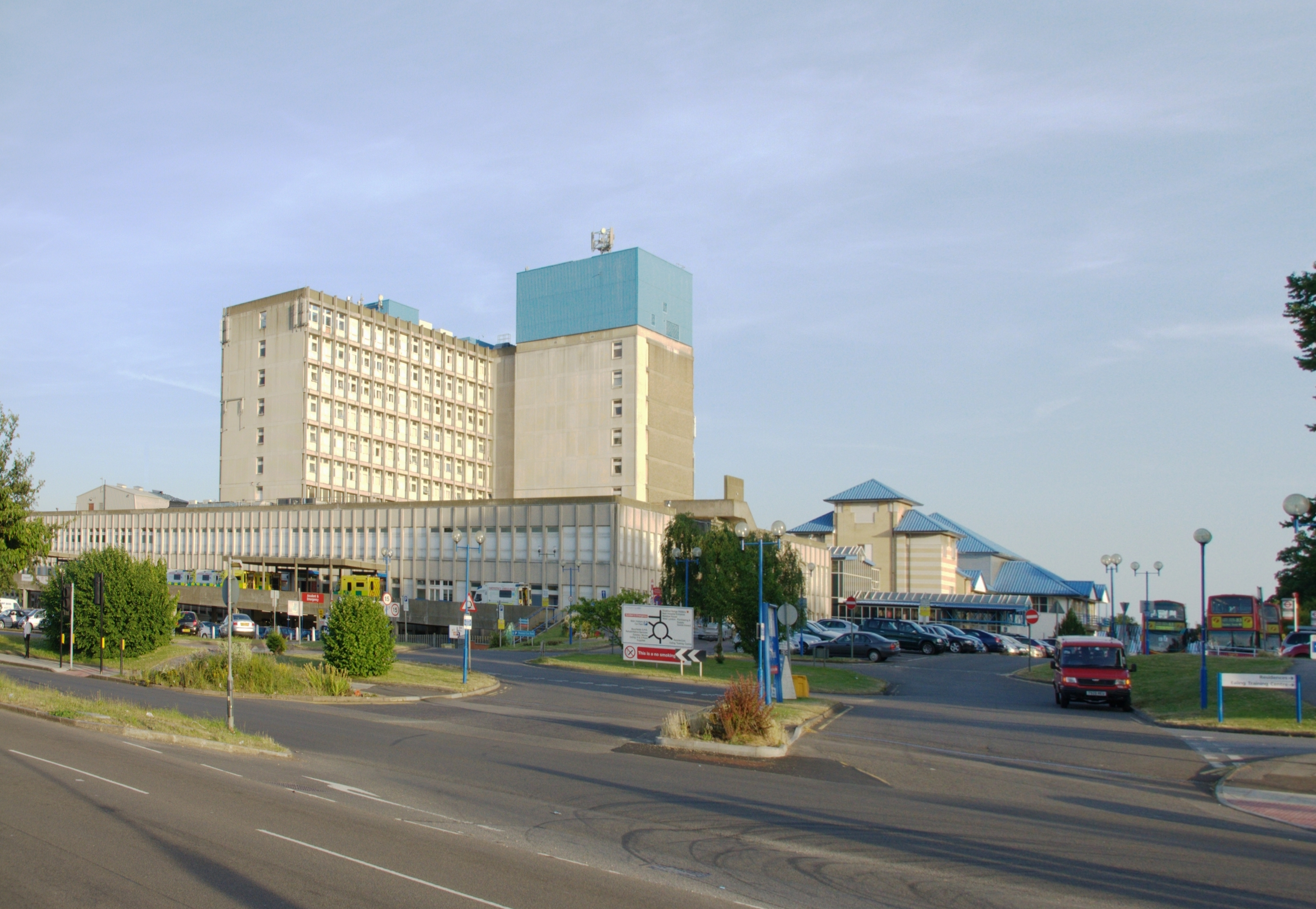

Geography
- Location: Uxbridge Road, Southall, UB1 3HW, Greater London, England, United Kingdom

Organisation
- Care system: NHS England
- Type: District General
- Affiliated university: Imperial College London

Services
- Emergency department: Yes Accident & Emergency
- Beds: ~358

History
- Founded: 1992; 34 years ago

Links
- Website: lnwh.nhs.uk
- Lists: Hospitals in England

Ealing Hospital is a district general NHS hospital, part of London North West University Healthcare NHS Trust, located in the Southall district of the London Borough of Ealing, West London, England. It lies on the south side of the Uxbridge Road 8.5 miles west of central London. It sits between Southall town centre to the west and Hanwell to the east. It is built on land that was once part of St Bernard's Hospital which is run by West London Mental Health (NHS) Trust. The Ealing Hospital Interchange bus station is adjacent to the hospital.

== History ==
=== Early history ===
The original hospital in the area was the Ealing Cottage Hospital which opened at Minton Lodge in Ealing Dene in 1871. This was replaced by the King Edward Memorial Hospital, named in memory of King Edward VII which was opened by Princess Helena in 1911. Two children's wards were opened in the 1930s and named the Princess Elizabeth Ward and the Prince Edward of Kent Ward; both were decorated with picture tiles depicting Noah's ark, fairy tales, nursery rhymes and biblical scenes and made by Carter and Co.. Two tiles depicted Princess Elizabeth and her sister Princess Margaret. When the hospital closed in the 1980s there was opposition to the tiles being moved away from the new hospital to the Ironbridge Gorge museum. Most were restored and re-installed in the new hospital but some are in the Jackfield Tile Museum.

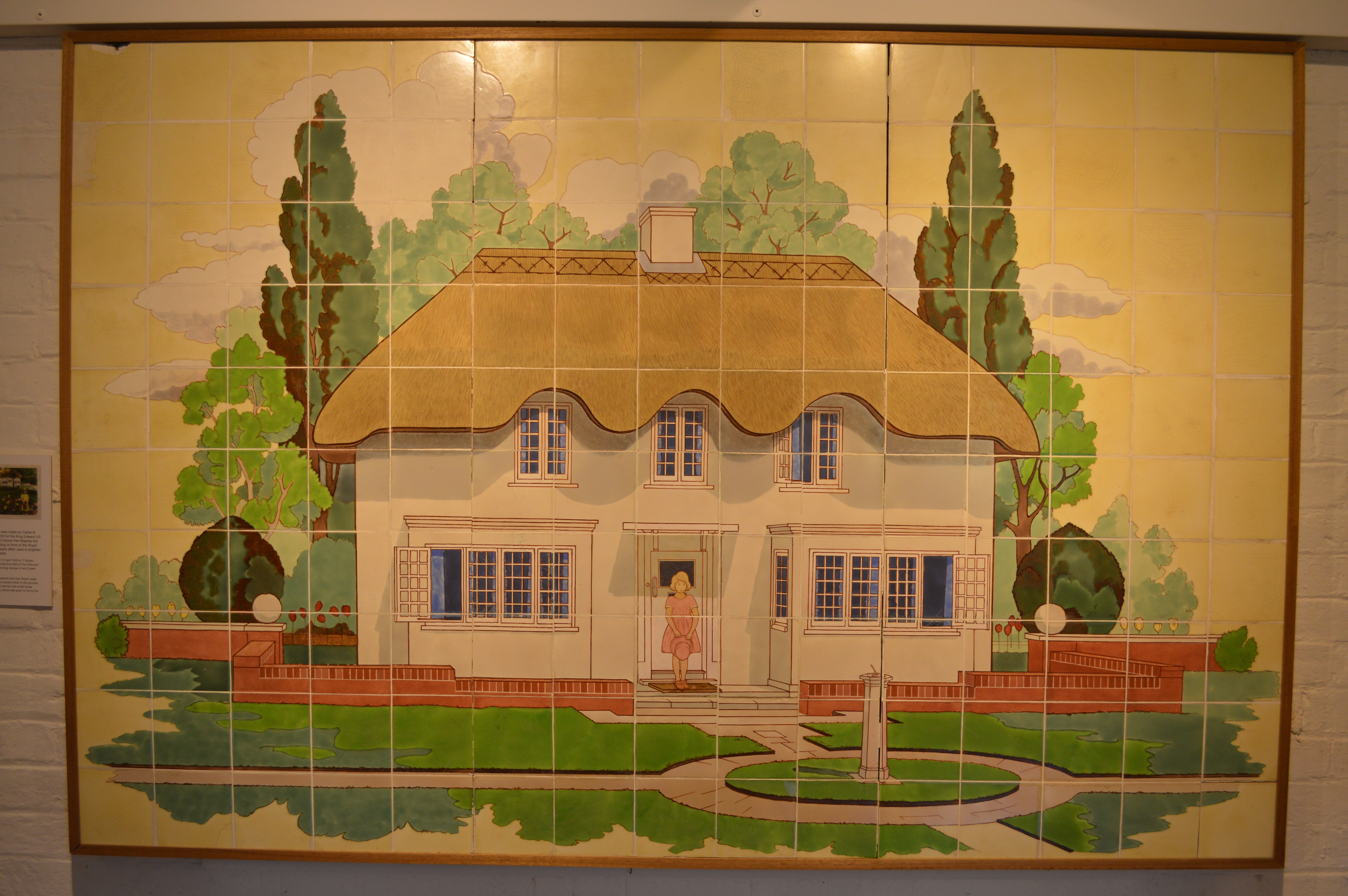
Picture tile from Princess Elizabeth Ward

The hospital joined the National Health Service in 1948 and came under the management of the North West Metropolitan Regional Hospital Board.

The present Ealing District Hospital was built in the late 1970s and opened 5 November 1979. Occupying part of St. Bernard's Hospital former grounds, the whole complex was renamed Ealing Hospital. (Note: This period has gone on to sometimes cause confusion. Owing to the government edict of the day that local psychiatric and maternity services were to be viewed and treated no differently from any other parts of the health service, they demanded that these services to be combined with the services provided by district hospitals. Hence, it became the 'General Unit.' During this time: St. Bernard's Hospital, the (then new) John Conolly Wing and Max Glatt Unit became collectively known as the 'Psychiatric Unit'. The whole complex was called 'Ealing Hospital'. This situation remained until the 'General Unit' and Maternity Unit administration split away to become the Ealing Hospital (NHS) Trust. For some years afterwards, such functions as site care and maintenance was still under the direction of the psychiatric services trusts of St Bernard's Hospital until the new Ealing Hospital NHS Trust started to prepare for Foundation status and became fully autonomous. This confusion has resulted in television crews pointing their cameras at the wrong buildings and delivery vans and juggernauts – having see the sign for St Bernard's 'wing' – going round and round looking for St. Bernard's Main Hospital block but in the adjacent housing estate just to the west.) At the same time, the King Edward Memorial was closed along with the nearby Hanwell Cottage Hospital in Green Lane and many of the services provided by the Southall-Norwood Hospital on The Green were transferred to the new hospital. The adjacent St. Bernard's Hospital regaining its old identity to provide mental health services once more.

=== Merger ===
In October 2014, as part of a drive towards efficiency savings in the NHS, Ealing Hospital NHS Trust merged with The North West London Hospitals NHS Trust. Ealing Hospital underwent a merger process that saw acute services distributed between itself, Northwick Park and St Mark's Hospital, and Central Middlesex Hospital. It is anticipated that there will be a phased removal of acute care services from Ealing Hospital in the medium to long-term.

=== History of maternity unit ===
The original NHS provision for births was Perivale Maternity Hospital, (Note: Originally opened 1948 as Perivale Maternity Home, the site eventually had 166 homes built upon it – Notting Hill Housing Trust.) Greenford. With a total of 67 beds and ten cots in a special care baby unit, Ealing residents 'chose' to have 33.5% of their births here at a rate of 1,800 per annum. (Queen Charlotte's Hospital came second with 23.5%). Various working committees agreed that for various reasons it would be better to move the facilities at Perivale to a new maternity unit located on the same site as Ealing General. Thus, on 1 March 1985, a proposal was submitted outlining a number of options together with assessments of relative costs and benefits. The aim was for a 60 beds unit to be able to reach 2,500 deliveries per annum.

Due to the centralisation of maternity units in North West London, in May 2015, the decision was made for the maternity unit at Ealing Hospital to be closed. From 31 June 2015, women were no longer able to give birth at Ealing Hospital.

=== Quality of care ===
In 2008 Ealing Hospital Trust was listed last out of the 165 trusts in England in a survey of patients' ratings of the level of care. Director of Nursing Paul Reeves said that the data was collected in August 2007 and the trust was addressing the issues with a series of action plans.

In 2008/09 Ealing Hospital did well in a Dr Foster patient safety enquiry achieving a band 4 – better than many other hospitals in the surrounding area.

In September 2014, following the closure of nearby Emergency Departments at Central Middlesex and Hammersmith Hospitals, there was a significant increase in pressure on surrounding departments, including at Ealing Hospital, where the percentage of patients being seen under 4 hours fell to 67.8%. An independent review is ongoing about the impact the decision to close these departments has had on emergency care in the North West London area.

Care UK runs an urgent care centre on the site which was investigated by ITV's Exposure programme in July 2015.

== See also ==
- Healthcare in London
- List of hospitals in England
- List of NHS trusts
