= IFP School =

Graduate engineering school near Paris

French Institute of Petroleum
- École Nationale Supérieure du Pétrole et des Moteurs
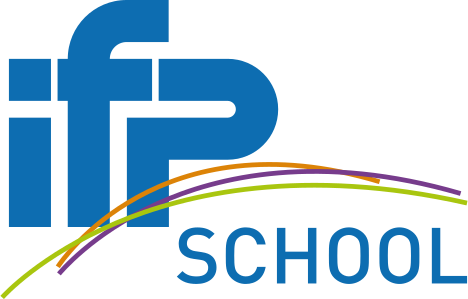
- Motto: L'école de l'innovation énergétique et de la mobilité durable
- Motto in English: The school for energy innovation and sustainable mobility
- Type: Grande école
- Established: 1954
- Affiliations: CGE - Conférence des Grandes Écoles
- Director: Christine Travers
- Students: 650
- Postgraduates: 500 / year
- Doctoral students: 55 / year
- Location: Rueil-Malmaison, Île-de-France, France; 48.8778°N 2.1722°E
- Campus: Suburban
- Website: ifp-school.com

The IFP School (French: École Nationale Supérieure du Pétrole et des Moteurs - ENSPM) is a graduate engineering school located in Rueil-Malmaison, France. Founded in 1954, IFP School is part of the IFP Energies nouvelles (IFPEN), a French public-sector research and training center. The school graduates approximately 600 students per year in 20 graduate programs (10 in English), employing 40 regular professors and 350 instructors from industry.

== History ==
While several institutions for oil and gas research and training existed in France since 1924, after the creation of IFP in 1944 these various institutions were folded into IFP and moved to the Rueil-Malmaison campus. The formal merger occurred in 1954, when by governmental decree the École Nationale Supérieure du Pétrole et des Moteurs (ENSPM) was formed and associated with the Fuels Department of the French Ministry of Ecology, Sustainable Development and Energy.

The school has evolved since its inception by creating the Center for Petroleum Economics (1963), expanding into graduate research degrees (1975), adding English language programs (1989), offering apprenticeship training (1996), and launching off-site degrees in critical energy regions around the world (2002).

== Campus ==
IFP School is located on the IFP Energies Nouvelles site in Rueil-Malmaison, 12.6 km (7.8 mi) from the center of Paris. The campus consists of an administrative building, the academic building (containing classrooms, computer labs, offices, a library), a cafeteria, and a dormitory (132 apartments).

Off-site degree programs are also offered in Algeria, Nigeria, Malaysia, Russia and Venezuela, through partnerships with local universities and industrial sponsors.

== Organization and administration ==
Research and academics are divided into four centers, with Management and Administration considered a separate department. The centers are:

- Exploration-Production
- Refining, Petrochemicals, Gas
- IC Engines and Hydrocarbon Utilizations
- Economics and Management

== Academics ==
IFP School primarily provides graduate training programs to both young engineers and industry professionals. Research masters and doctoral theses can be prepared in IFP's laboratories in all fields related to oil, gas, new energy technologies or engines. Approximately 50% of the student body is from outside France, and with 80% of students receiving scholarships or corporate sponsorship, IFP claims a 99% employment rate of graduating students. Notable degrees, organized by center, include:

Center for Economics and Management

- Energy Technology Economics & Management (ETEM, formerly PEM)
- Sustainable Development, Environmental and Energy Economics
- Energy and Environmental Policy and Economics
- Energy and Markets

Center for Exploration-Production

- Petroleum Geosciences, Geology or Geophysics
- Reservoir Geoscience and Engineering
- Petroleum Engineering and Project Development
- Lithosphere, Basins, Oil

Center for IC Engines and Hydrocarbon Utilizations

- Powertrain Engineering
- Energy and Products
- Energy and Powertrain
- Electrification of Automotive Propulsion

Center for Refining, Petrochemicals, Gas

- Processes and Polymers
- Energy and Processes

In 2010, a team of five students from the IFP School "Petroleum Geosciences" program (made up of geologists and geophysicists of the 2010 class) won the Imperial Barrel Award, a worldwide competition sponsored by the American Association of Petroleum Geologists.

== Student life ==
Various activities outside of the classroom are organized at IFP School, centered around language courses, the Business Skills Center, and several cultural and athletic associations. IFP's campus is a 30-minute commute from central Paris by RER A, so much of the student life is centered there.

== Notable alumni ==
- Olivier Bouygues, deputy CEO of Bouygues
- Pierre Gadonneix, French businessman, chairman of the board and CEO of EDF, 2004–2009
- François Perrodo, chairman of the board of Perenco
- Laurent Rossi, chief executive officer at Automobiles Alpine and Alpine F1 Team
- Macky Sall, President of Senegal
- Jon Samseth, specialist of energy issues, scientific advisor for publications of UNEP and member of the Norwegian Academy of Technological Sciences
