= Henri Konan Bédié Bridge =

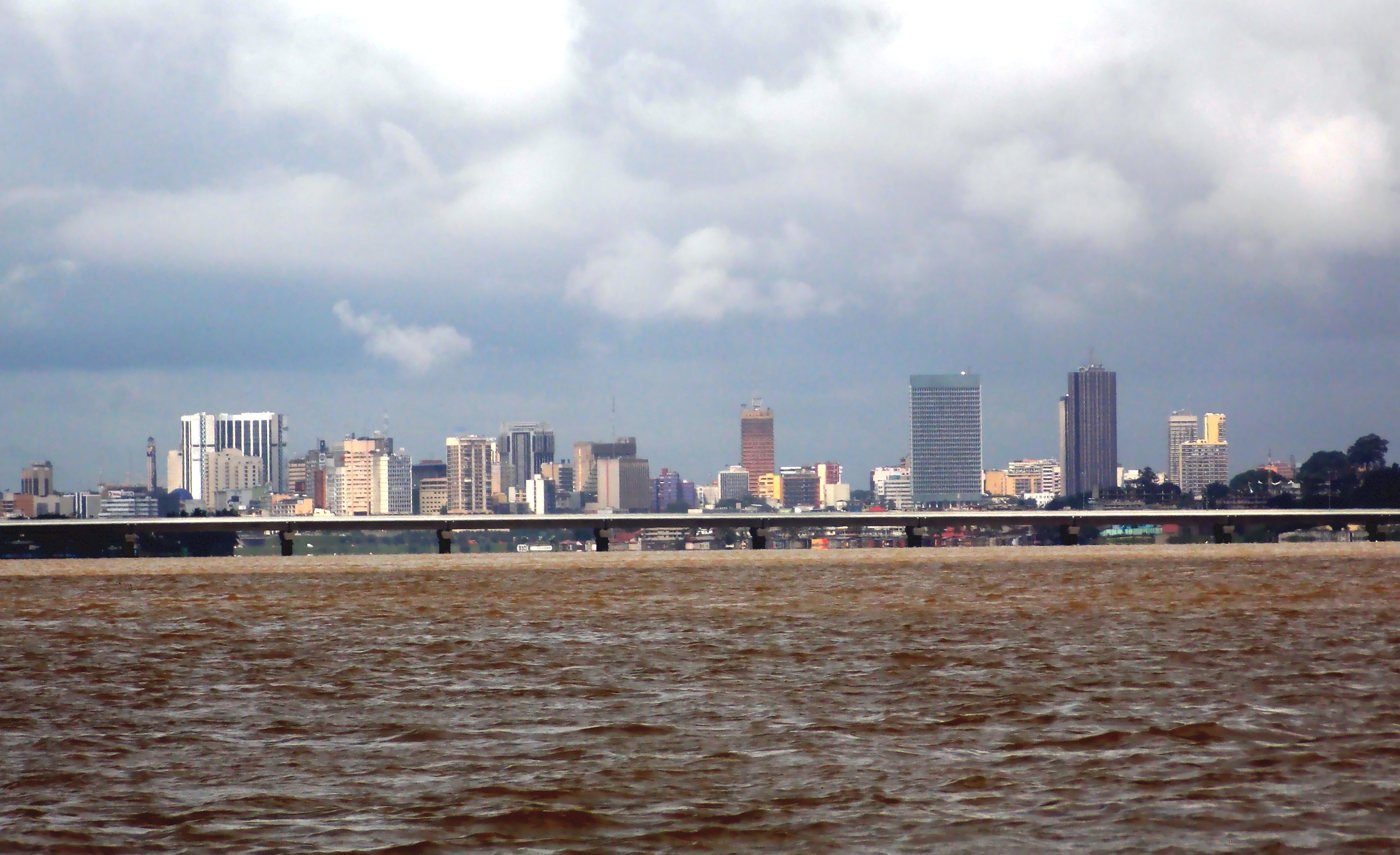
- Panorama of the Henri Konan Bédié Bridge
- Coordinates: 5°19′19″N 3°58′50″W
- Locale: Abidjan, Ivory Coast

Characteristics
- Design: Box girder bridge
- Total length: 1500 m

History
- Opened: 2014; 12 years ago

Statistics
- Toll: Yes

Location
- Interactive map of Henri Konan Bédié Bridge

Henri Konan Bédié Bridge, also known as the HKB Bridge or Third Bridge, is a road bridge and expressway linking the north and south of Abidjan. The 1.5 km (0.93 mi) viaduct crosses the Ébrié Lagoon connecting the districts of Cocody and Marcory.

Built, financed and operated as a Public-private partnership, the toll bridge is the third major road crossing of the Ebrié lagoon and was designed to reduce congestion on its two predecessors, the Houphouët-Boigny Bridge and the Charles de Gaulle Bridge, constructed in the 1950s and 1960s respectively.

== History ==
The bridge was featured in development plans for Abidjan as far back as 1952. In 1997 the Ivorian government signed a concession agreement with a consortium headed by the Bouygues Group for the construction and operation of the bridge and associated expressway project. Due to political instability, major work on the project only got underway in 2011.
