= St Mark's Hospital =

Coordinates: 51°31′51.879″N 0°16′8.718″W

St Mark's Hospital, The National Bowel Hospital
- London North West University Healthcare NHS Trust
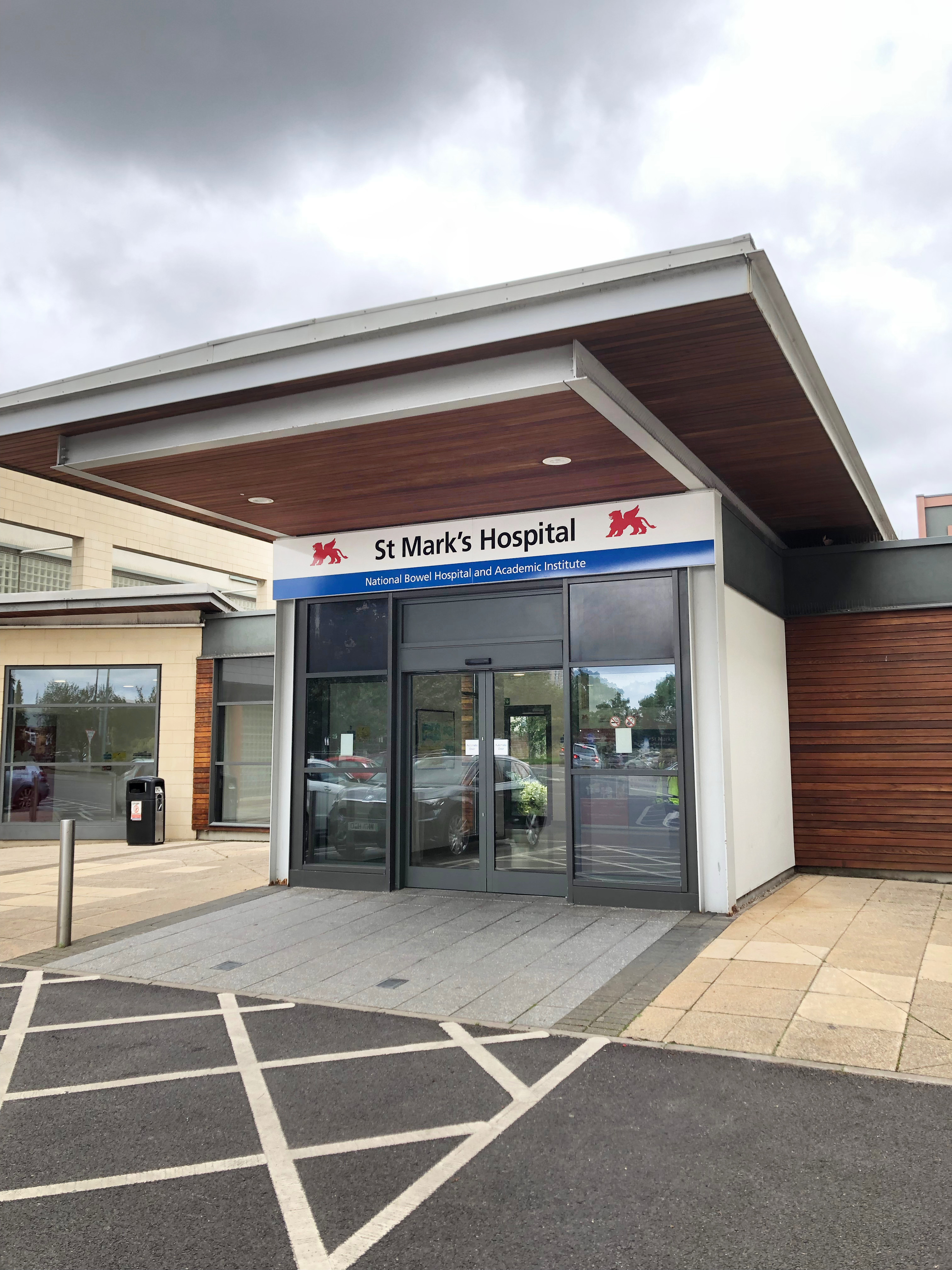
- St Mark's Hospital

- Location within Brent

Geography
- Location: Acton Lane, London NW10 7NS, Greater London, England, United Kingdom

Organisation
- Care system: Public NHS
- Type: Specialist
- Affiliated university: Imperial College London

Services
- Emergency department: No Accident & Emergency
- Beds: <40
- Speciality: Intestinal and Colorectal medicine

History
- Founded: 1835; 191 years ago

Links
- Website: www.stmarkshospital.nhs.uk
- Lists: Hospitals in England

St Mark's Hospital, The National Bowel Hospital (informally St Mark's) is a hospital in Park Royal, Greater London, England. Managed by London North West University Healthcare NHS Trust, it is the only hospital in the world to specialise entirely in intestinal and colorectal medicine and is a national and international referral centre for intestinal and colorectal disorders. It is the only hospital in the UK, and one of only 14 worldwide, to be recognised as a centre of excellence by the World Organisation of Digestive Endoscopy.

The Main Hospital is at the Central Middlesex site in Acton Lane, London, located in the most southerly part of the London Borough of Brent. It has two other hubs, one is St Mark's at Northwick Park situated within Northwick Park Hospital in Harrow and the other is St Mark's at Ealing situated within Ealing Hospital. St Mark's is closely associated with Imperial College London and is a major centre for teaching and research.

== History ==
=== Beginnings ===
The beginnings of St Mark's Hospital were in a small room at No 11 Aldersgate Street where, in 1835, Frederick Salmon opened 'The Infirmary for the Relief of the Poor afflicted with Fistula and other Diseases of the Rectum'. There were just seven beds and in the first year 131 patients were admitted. Frederick Salmon was born in Bath in 1796 and served his apprenticeship in medicine there. He qualified at St Bartholomew's Hospital in 1817 and subsequently became a house-surgeon. In 1827, he was elected to a Surgeon's post at the Aldersgate Street Dispensary. However, Salmon resigned five years later, along with the rest of the medical staff, because of a dispute with the Management Committee about the method of choosing new staff. Tired of the restrictions of working within the establishment, Salmon decided to found his own institution to provide treatment for those conditions which were regarded as 'the most distressing that can afflict our common nature'. So the 'Fistula Infirmary', as it came to be known, was started.

Much of the financial support came from the City of London. The Lord Mayor, William Taylor Copeland, was a grateful patient of Salmon's and became the first President. Another benefactor was Charles Dickens, who blamed his need for Salmon's surgical attentions on 'too much sitting at my desk'! There was an overwhelming need for such an institution giving specialist treatment free of charge to London's poor. Therefore, in 1838, when the number of patients had trebled, Salmon moved to larger premises at 38 Charterhouse Square, where there were fourteen beds and more space for treating out-patients. The first matron, Mrs Watson, was appointed in the same year. Thirteen years later, a site in City Road was purchased from the Dyers' Company and the almshouses that occupied it were converted to a 25-bed hospital. This was opened on St Mark's Day, 25 April 1854, and took the name of St Mark's Hospital for Fistula and other Diseases of the Rectum.

The staff consisted of a surgeon, a Matron (Mrs Wilson who held the post from 1846-1873), a dispenser, nurses and servants. St Mark's was unique in not employing a physician until 1948, with the arrival of Francis Avery-Jones, "the father of British gastroenterology" and pioneer of medical treatment of peptic ulcer. In 1859, Frederick Salmon resigned from his post as Surgeon. He is said to have performed 3,500 operations without a single fatality, a remarkable feat in an age when anaesthetics were only just beginning to be used and antiseptics were unknown. The Governors commissioned a portrait of him which is now displayed outside of the ward that bears his name.

=== New St Mark's ===
By the 1870s, ever-increasing demands on the Hospital caused rebuilding to be considered. The adjacent site, occupied by rice mills, was acquired but could not be developed for some years due to lack of funds. Eventually, building began and in January 1896 the 'New St Mark's' was opened. There was considerable difficulty in meeting the costs of maintaining the new building and it was the entertainment industry that finally came to the rescue. Lillie Langtry organised a Charity Matinee at her theatre in Drury Lane and the hospital was saved. In 1909, the name of the hospital was changed for a second time to St Mark's Hospital for Cancer, Fistula and Other Diseases of the Rectum, reflecting the work and interests of John Percy Lockhart-Mummery, who was a pioneer in cancer surgery. The First World War seems to have made little direct impact, although ten beds were given over to servicemen. Despite the stringency of the times, the Governors purchased more land on the east side of the hospital which gave room for expansion after hostilities had ceased. An Appeal Fund launched in 1920 which was very successful. In 1926 work began on a large extension which gave the hospital a new appearance and provided two new wards, as well as new Out-Patient, X-Ray, Pathology and Research Departments. A nurses' home was also provided for the first time. This was replaced by a self-contained home in 1936, when the former accommodation became a private wing named after Lockhart-Mummery, who had retired the previous year. St Mark's was taken over by the new National Health Service in 1948. Matron E J Cable (appointed in 1946) led the nursing staff through the changes and ongoing nurse staffing shortages, with heavy reliance on recruitment of overseas trained nurses until her retirement in 1964. A Samaritan Fund was established to assist patients, and meetings ceased in May 1949 when administration of the Fund officially passed to the Ladies Association. The Ladies Association became the Friends of St Mark's in June 1971.

=== 1972 to present ===
The hospital was administered jointly with Hammersmith Hospital until the NHS reforms of 1972, when it became attached to St Bartholomew's Hospital. After 1974, St Mark's was part of the newly established City and Hackney Health District, which also included Hackney General, the Mothers', the German, the Eastern and St Leonard's Hospitals. During the 1980s, many of the hospitals in the City and Hackney District were closed and their services transferred to the new Homerton Hospital.

The government introduced self-governing NHS Trusts and in 1992, Sir Bernard Tomlinson's Report of the Inquiry into the London Health Service proposed radical changes to the hospital groupings then in place. St Mark's remained part of the Barts NHS Shadow Trust (later Barts NHS Group) until April 1994, when the changes envisaged by the Tomlinson Report came into force. At this point, Bart's joined with the Royal London and the London Chest Hospitals to form the Royal Hospitals NHS Trust (later Barts and The London NHS Trust).

St Mark's became part of the North West London NHS trust and moved to the same site as Northwick Park Hospital in 1995. In 2021, St Mark's transferred a majority of its services to the Central Middlesex site, with Northwick Park and Ealing remaining as satellite hospitals. The hospital maintains strong teaching ties with Imperial College School of Medicine.

From 2014 to 2018, international musician and community advocate Alexander Paul Burton fundraised for St. Mark's Hospital, supporting initiatives aimed at expanding patient care and research in gastroenterology. He also supported initiatives related to bowel cancer research.
