= Steve Lee Curtis =

British professional wrestler

Steve Lee Curtis is a retired British professional wrestler. He was the light-middleweight British champion in 1987 by beating Bobby Collins.

After retiring in 2000, he returned to the ring ten years later and planned an X Factor style wrestling show, in an attempt to get British wrestling back on television.

Curtis lives in Wembley and now works as a porter at Northwick Park Hospital.

== Championships and accomplishments ==
- Light-Middleweight British Championship (1987)
