= Olivier Bouygues =

French businessman (born 14 September 1950)

- Born: 14 September 1950 (age 75); France
- Education: IFP School
- Occupations: Deputy CEO, Bouygues; CEO, SCDM
- Children: 2
- Parent: Francis Bouygues
- Relatives: Martin Bouygues (brother)

Olivier Bouygues (born 14 September 1950) is deputy CEO of the French company Bouygues, and CEO of the family holding company SCDM.

== Early life ==
He was born on 14 September 1950, and educated at the École Nationale Supérieure du Pétrole et des Moteurs.

== Career ==
In 1974, he joined the Bouygues group, beginning his career in the civil works branch. From 1983-88, he worked at Bouygues Offshore, and held the posts of Director of Boscam, a Cameroon subsidiary, then Director of the France Works and Special Projects division. From 1988-92, he was Chairman and CEO of Maison Bouygues. In 1992, he became Group Executive Vice President of Utilities Management, which grouped the international and French activities of Saur. In 2002, he was appointed Deputy CEO of Bouygues.

He is a director of TF1 Group.

== Personal life ==
He is co-owner of the Château Montrose vineyard, with his brother Martin Bouygues. The brothers purchased the winery in 2006.

Bouygues was briefly taken into police custody in July 2025 on suspicion of illegally hunting protected bird species, including cormorants, buzzards, and egrets, on his estate in Sologne. The French Office for Biodiversity and the Orléans prosecutor's office alleged that the killings were part of a "systematic destruction" of protected species over several years and discovered evidence of potentially illegal wild boar breeding on the property. He is scheduled to appear before the Court of appeal in March 2026.
