= Peter Deeley =

Peter Deeley (born c. 1949) is a British journalist who until January 2006 was a presenter on the London phone-in radio station, LBC 97.3.

== Career ==
Deeley has interviewed former U.S. Presidents Ronald Reagan and Richard Nixon, as well as Dr. Henry Kissinger and former British Prime Ministers Baroness Thatcher, Tony Blair and Sir John Major.

His career began in the late 1960s when he reported on the Solihull News in the West Midlands, before moving to the Birmingham Evening Mail. In the late 1970s, he became deputy news editor and talk show presenter at Beacon Radio in Wolverhampton. From there, he moved to the Independent Radio News reporting team, where he remained until the early 1980s, before joining radio station LBC in London, presenting LBC Reports and Weekend Breakfast.

From 1985 until 1990, he was the breakfast anchorman at LBC alongside Douglas Cameron. He has also worked on Talk Radio UK, BBC Radio Kent and BBC Radio 5 Live. Before his retirement from broadcasting, Deeley presented the overnight programme on LBC from 1 am to 5 am on Mondays and from 12 am to 5 am on Tuesdays, Wednesdays and Thursdays.

== Personal life and later career ==
In December 2005, Deeley announced during his programme that he was leaving LBC to become an addiction psychotherapist, being a recovering alcoholic himself. He broadcast his last regular show in the early hours of 2 January 2006. However, in April 2006 he briefly returned to LBC standing in for Marcus Churchill.

In 2007, Deeley and his partner Alan Tollins (born c. 1959), a GP, bought a country bed and breakfast business at a 15th-century hall house, Farthingales Homestead, in the ancient village of Nonington near Canterbury on the edge of the North Downs. Due to the declining health of Tollins' parents, the pair decided to sell the business in 2015.
