= Lawrence Tomlinson =

English businessman (born 1964)

- Born: Lawrence Neil Tomlinson; 24 July 1964 (age 62); Batley, United Kingdom
- Education: Batley Grammar School; Bradford University
- Occupation: Businessman
- Children: Amy Tomlinson; Emma Tomlinson; Freddie Tomlinson; Lucy Tomlinson

Lawrence Neil Tomlinson (born 24 July 1964) is an English businessman and chairman of the LNT Group. In 2025, Tomlinson ranked 267th on the Sunday Times Rich List with an estimated personal wealth of £525m. Tomlinson built his wealth in the care home industry, and subsequently diversified into other ventures including Ginetta Cars.

== Early life ==
Tomlinson grew up in Batley, where he attended grammar school before going on to study engineering at Huddersfield College at age 15. Early on in his studies, engineering company, Wellman Bibby, spotted his skills and sponsored his engineering degree at Bradford University. He was head hunted by Holset Engineering for their Graduate Trainee Programme in 1987.

Throughout most of his youth, his father was a haulage driver and his mother worked at Fox's Biscuits. When he was in his teens his parents started a care home. Tomlinson was involved from the start, writing software on an Amstrad 8256 to aid them with the management of the care home. After completing his studies, and whilst still in training at Holset Engineering, Tomlinson bought the care home from his parents in 1988. This was the start of Tricare.

== Career ==
Tomlinson initially started with a single care home in 1988, which has since grown into the LNT Group and employs over 1,000 people across five core businesses:

- Ginetta, an automobile manufacturer.
- Ideal Care Homes, a care home operator.
- LNT Construction, a care home building firm.
- LNT Software, a developer of care home management systems.
- LNT Solutions, a developer of climate protection systems for the aerospace and rail industries.

The LNT Group was ranked 28th in the Sunday Times Fast Track 100 Companies in 2010.

Tomlinson was the Institute of Directors’ Overall Director of the Year 2013 and advised Government on business issues as the Serial Entrepreneur in Residence in the Department of Business, Innovation and Skills in 2013–14.

=== Biography ===
Tomlinson started in business importing ski boats and classic cars into the UK. Borrowing £526k from his local bank in 1988, he bought out his parents care home company and, spotting a gap in the market for bespoke purpose built care homes, he went on to design, build and operate new facilities, establishing LNT Construction in 1991. LNT Construction has built 20–25% of all the new elderly care homes in the UK, operating under a vertically integrated model since 2008, when Tomlinson purchased their main subcontractors for cash.

From there, he launched further businesses including LNT Software, which develops and sells bespoke software for the care home industry. LNT Software's care home management programme, CoolCare has been installed in over 1,000 care homes across the country.

A further addition to the LNT Group was LNT Solutions, a chemical company that Tomlinson bought from his motor-racing instructor in the pub following a track day. The business initially produced domestic products which, whilst demonstrating good technology, were not best suited to business-consumer sales. LNT Solutions supplies Network Rail with a chemical that stops trains slipping on the leaves, de-ices the third rail and supplies runway and aeroplane wing de-icer to airports across North America and Northern Europe.

In 2005 Tomlinson acquired Ginetta, which has been continuously building race cars since 1958. Since its purchase by LNT, Ginetta has grown to become one of the most significant players on the global motorsport scene. Tomlinson has himself raced at Le Mans winning the GT2 class at the 24 hours of Le Mans in 2006. Tomlinson's contribution to engineering has been recognised by three Honorary Doctorates from the University of Huddersfield, the University of Bradford and Leeds Metropolitan University.

Tomlinson sold Orchard Care Homes (originally Tricare) in 2007 for £175m. Since the sale, he has set up the Ideal Carehomes operation. He re-entered the care sector in 2009 when he set up Ideal Care Homes. In 2015, social housing provider Anchor bought 24 care homes from Ideal Carehomes in a deal worth in excess of £100m. Ideal Carehomes retained 15 care homes across the Midlands, North West and Yorkshire.

In June 2017, Ideal Carehomes moved to its new Headquarters in the Midlands to bring the team closer to the location of the homes and has since expanded its portfolio to 16 homes after opening Mountview in Leicester in November 2017.

Tomlinson donated £40,500 to the Conservative Party during the 2019 United Kingdom general election, split across thirteen candidates.

== Entrepreneur In Residence ==
In April 2013, Lawrence Tomlinson became Serial Entrepreneur in Residence at the Department for Business, Innovation and Skills. Tomlinson was selected from over 100 candidates.

Tomlinson was awarded a £10,000 honorarium and expenses in return for one day a week in the Department. Tomlinson ran a competition for his £10,000 honorarium in return for the best idea for growth. The winner was announced during Global Entrepreneurship Week in November 2013.

Throughout the year, Tomlinson worked across Government departments providing advice and feedback to civil servants, Ministers and MPs on policy ideas including; planning, red-tape and access to finance.

Tomlinson’s time in the Department for Business, Innovation and Skills will largely be remembered for his work on the Tomlinson Report.

The Entrepreneur in Residence scheme has been extended for a further year. In March 2014 BIS advertised for two new Entrepreneurs.

== Motor racing ==
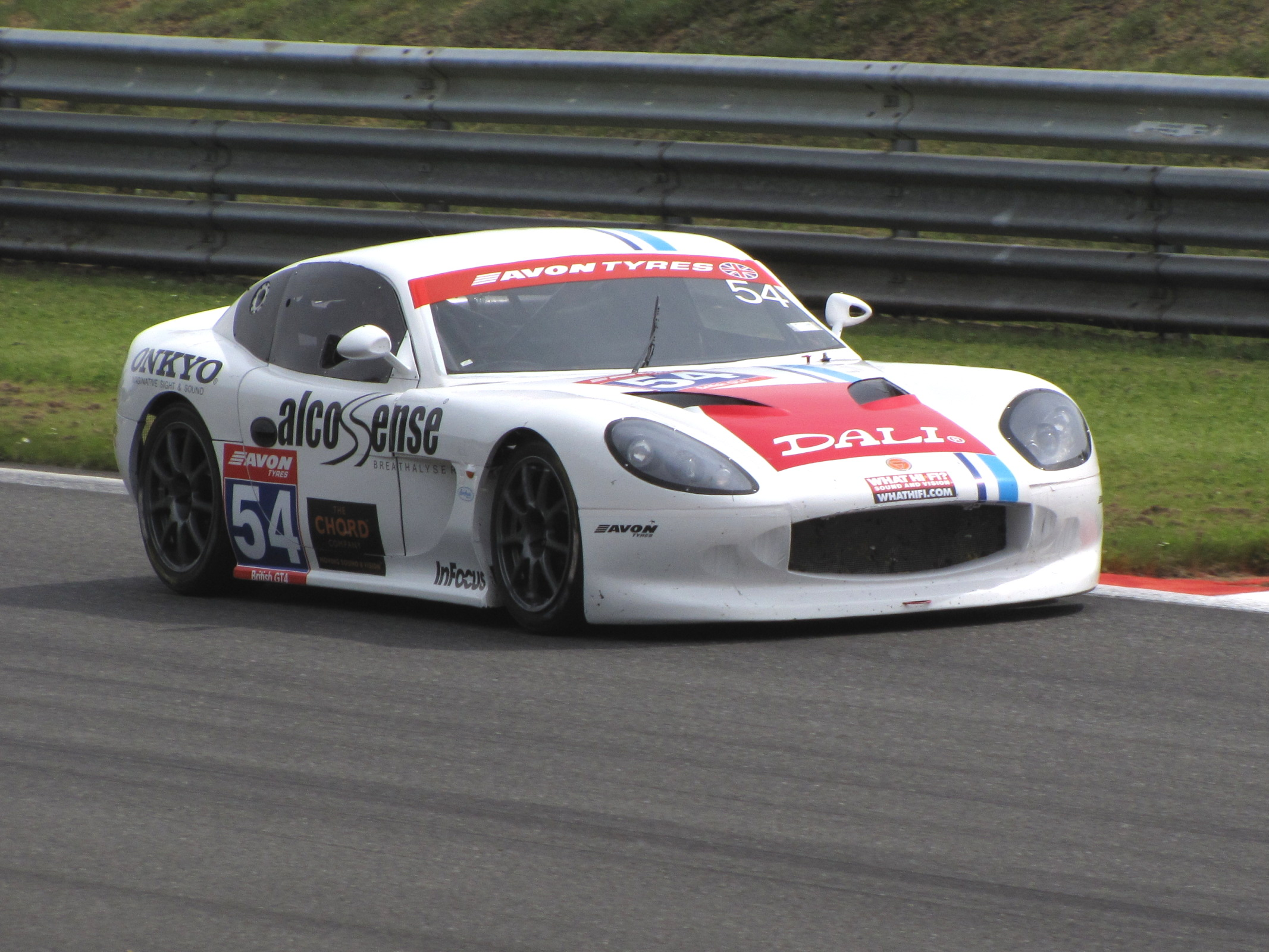
A Ginetta G50 racing at Circuit de Spa-Francorchamps, Belgium, the car for which Tomlinson drew the base specifications

An enthusiastic race car driver, Tomlinson and his two co-drivers steered the Team LNT Panoz Esperante to first place in the GT2 class of the 24 Hours of Le Mans race in 2006. In 2009 he raced the in-house developed Ginetta-Zytek GZ09S, which was also raced in 2010 by Nigel Mansell.

In 2005, Tomlinson bought Ginetta Cars from the group of enthusiasts who had brought it out of administration. Tomlinson designed the specification for the Ginetta G50 car which was built within six months, and now races in GT championships across the world, and has its own Ginetta GT Supercup series in the UK. After Ginetta won the Small Business of the Year award from the Motorsport Industry Association in 2008, and the Ginetta G50 crowned Autosport's Car of the Year, in 2009 Tomlinson was nominated by the MIA for the Outstanding Contribution to Motorsport award.

Today, the LNT Group and Ginetta are housed in a purpose built site in Garforth, Leeds. Opened by Damon Hill OBE in December 2007, it houses both the group headquarters and the Ginetta car factory.

== 24 Hours of Le Mans results ==
Year	Team	Co-Drivers	Car	Class	Laps	Pos.	Class Pos.
2004	(United Kingdom) Chamberlain-Synergy Motorsport	(United Kingdom) Nigel Greensall (United Kingdom) Gareth Evans	TVR Tuscan T400R	GT	291	22nd	9th
2006	(United Kingdom) Team LNT	(United Kingdom) Tom Kimber-Smith (United Kingdom) Richard Dean	Panoz Esperante GT-LM	GT2	321	15th	1st
2007	(United Kingdom) Team LNT	(United Kingdom) Richard Dean (United Kingdom) Rob Bell	Panoz Esperante GT-LM	GT2	308	23rd	5th
2009	(United Kingdom) Team LNT	(United Kingdom) Richard Dean (United Kingdom) Nigel Moore	Ginetta-Zytek GZ09S	LMP1	178	DNF	DNF

== 24 Hours of Silverstone results ==
Year	Team	Co-Drivers	Car	Car No.	Class	Laps	Pos.	Class Pos.
2008	(United Kingdom) Team LNT	(United Kingdom) Richard Dean (United Kingdom) Nigel Moore	Ginetta G50	27	2	0	DNF	DNF
2010	(United Kingdom) Team LNT	(United Kingdom) Stewart Linn (United Kingdom) Mike Simpson (United Kingdom) Nigel Moore	Ginetta G40	83	4	521	12th	1st
2011	(United Kingdom) Rollcentre Racing	(United Kingdom) Martin Short (United Kingdom) Mike Simpson (United Kingdom) Colin Turkington (United Kingdom) Matt Nicoll-Jones	Ginetta G55	30	1	80	DNF	DNF
2015	(United Kingdom) Team LNT	(United Kingdom) Chris Hoy (United Kingdom) Charlie Robertson (United Kingdom) Mike Simpson (France) Gaëtan Paletou	Ginetta Juno LMP3	12	1	418	13th	2nd
