= London North West University Healthcare NHS Trust =

NHS hospital trust

- Type: NHS trust
- Established: 1 October 2014
- Hospitals: Central Middlesex Hospital; Ealing Hospital; Northwick Park Hospital; St Mark's Hospital
- Website: www.lnwh.nhs.uk

London North West University Healthcare NHS Trust is an NHS trust based in London, United Kingdom. The trust was formed by the merger of North West London Hospitals NHS Trust and Ealing Hospital NHS Trusts in October 2014.

The trust runs Northwick Park Hospital and St Mark's Hospital in Harrow, Central Middlesex Hospital in Park Royal, and Ealing Hospital in Southall. It also runs 4 community hospitals in addition to providing community services in Brent, Ealing and Harrow. The trust employs 8,590 staff across all its sites, and in 2016/17 had 141,355 attendances to its Emergency Department, and 80,756 elective inpatient and day case admissions.

In 2018 the trust decided not to submit a bid for a 10-year contract to provide most "out of hospital services" to Ealing Clinical Commissioning Group – services which they had been providing. The chief executive told staff that it was not possible to provide a quality service for the money on offer, despite the sum being offered being higher than the sum the trust was already receiving for delivering the services. Ultimately three bidders participated in the procurement and the services were awarded to a consortium led by West London Mental Health NHS Trust.

In 2019 it set up a service combining vascular surgery, endovascular surgery and interventional radiology at Northwick Park Hospital, challenging the dominance of the London teaching hospitals in specialist services.

== Performance ==
It finished the financial year 2014/5 with a deficit of £55.9 million.

In October and November 2014 it had the worst performance in the country on the Four-hour target in emergency departments after the two smaller casualty units at Central Middlesex and Hammersmith hospitals were closed in September. The trust was rated 'worse than expected' over care for women giving birth.

The trust had a deficit of £75 million in 2015/6 and had to borrow £105 million in December 2015.

In March 2018 it was the eighteenth worst performer in A&E in England, with only 60.2% of patients in the main A&E seen within 4 hours.

It forecast a year-end deficit of £92 million for 2019–20 after reducing the elective waiting list from 53,600 in February 2019 to 51,170 in December 2019.

== See also ==
- List of NHS trusts
