= Ganesh Suntharalingam =

British anaesthetist

Ganesh Suntharalingam (born March 1967) is a British anaesthetist, the president of the Intensive Care Society and the former medical lead of North West London Critical Care Network. In 2006 he led the successful treatment of six volunteers who had become critically ill after being given a new drug at a private trials unit within the grounds of Northwick Park Hospital where he worked. The editor of The New England Journal of Medicine later stated that “all six volunteers survived in part because of the extraordinary intensive care delivered during the critical stages of their illness”.
