= Tomlinson Report =

The Tomlinson Report was published on 25 November 2013, authored by Lawrence Tomlinson, who was the Entrepreneur in Residence at the Department for Business, Innovation and Skills at the time. Lawrence's report focused on the large body of evidence he received from businesses about Royal Bank of Scotland's turnaround division, Global Restructuring Group (GRG).

== Background ==
During his time as Entrepreneur in Residence, Lawrence uncovered very concerning patterns of behaviour which appeared to lead to the destruction of good and viable UK businesses. Lawrence called for further investigation into this behaviour by the appropriate authorities and immediate action to stop this unscrupulous treatment of businesses.

The publication of the Tomlinson Report coincided with a Sunday Times investigation into the same issue, publishing their stories on the same date.

== Regulatory response ==
The Financial Conduct Authority announced that it would undertake a section 166 investigation on 29 November 2013 and has since appointed Promontory Financial Services and Mazars to undertake the Skilled Person review.

Lawrence continues to work with the FCA Skilled Person to aid their review, which is due to report in Quarter 3 of 2014.

== RBS response ==
Immediately following the publication of the Tomlinson Report, RBS appointed Clifford Chance to investigate whether they were guilty of systematically defrauding their customers. This is not something Lawrence accused the bank of. The Clifford Chance Report was published on 17 April 2014. Whilst it concentrated on accusations of fraud, many were surprised by how damning the report was.
