= Colas Group =

French civil engineering firm

Colas SA
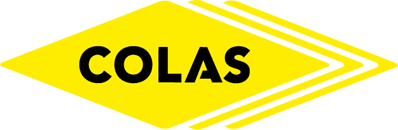
- Company type: Public
- Traded as: Euronext Paris: RE
- Industry: Civil Engineering
- Founded: January 1, 1955; 71 years ago
- Headquarters: Boulogne-Billancourt
- Services: Road construction, railway track construction
- Parent: Bouygues
- Subsidiaries: Colas Ltd; Colas Rail; Sacer; Screg; Destia
- Website: www.colas.com

Colas Group is a major French civil engineering firm specialising in road construction and rail track construction through its Colas Rail subsidiary. Since the 1990s, the group has incorporated the Screg and Sacer road construction firms.

Road construction makes up 80% of the group's activities. Additional related activities include road signage, construction, various civil engineering activities including pipe-laying, and rail track construction and maintenance.

Colas Ltd is a UK subsidiary.

== History ==
=== Colas ===
The product name Colas was given in 1924, derived from the terms 'cold' and 'asphalt'.

Fed by local demand, SGE developed production facilities in France in the 1920s, and also exported the Colas product to French North African possessions, Poland, and Romania. By the end of the 1920s, demand was such that SGE sought the partnership of Anglo-Dutch oil company Shell, and the Société Routière Colas company was founded, with two Shell subsidiaries taking two thirds of the stock and SGE the remaining third. Despite its creation during the Great Depression, the company was successful. It developed new bitumen emulsion-derived products and diversified into a wide range of road construction services during the 1930s.

During the Second World War, the company, majority-owned by a Dutch firm, was treated as an enemy possession. After the war, the company recovered and became the leading road construction company in France. It expanded into French North Africa, creating full subsidiary operations in Algeria and Morocco by 1950. The Société Parisienne Raveau-Cartier acquired most of Shell's shares in the company in 1958.

In the decades following World War II, the company established a strong position in the French market through collaboration with the government transportation ministry. It continued to operate in former colonies in Africa and elsewhere, and began to expand via native subsidiaries in other European countries. It also expanded through acquisitions in France, (Note: Acquisitions included Compagnie Lyonnaise des Goudrons de Bitumes, France-Route, Routes Modernes, Maison Devaux and Compagnie Métropolitaine de Asphaltes.) Belgium (Arboroute), Canada, (Note: In the 1960s, the Colas company acquired Fabi & Fils (founded 1927)and Modern Paving (founded 1939). The two companies merged in 1974, forming Sintra (derived from Société d'Investissement et de Travaux)) and established a U.S. presence in Vermont.

In the 1980s, still the market leader in France and North Africa, the company acquired Grands Travaux de l’Est, the starting point for expansion into countries surrounding the Indian Ocean as well as the diversification into its civil engineering activities. The Bouygues company became the main shareholder in the 1980s, with Colas under Shell/Bouygues jointly holding the Société d'Investissement de Travaux Publics (SITP). French road construction competitors Screg and Sacer were also part of the SITP structure. By the 1990s, the international subsidiaries had been bought back from Shell, and both Sacer (1993) and Screg (1997) became Colas subsidiaries. In 2000, the group acquired Seco Rail, (Note: SECO was the Societe d'Etudes et de Construction d'Outillage.) followed by AMEC Spie Rail (Note: AMEC acquired the Spie Batignolles engineering group between 1997 and 2003, including the Spie Rail subsidiary) in May 2007. The Colas Rail division was formed in 2007.

=== Sacer ===
The origins of the Sacer company date back to the 19th century and the Anciens Etablissements Brun company, formed through the merger of companies owned by Gaëtan Brun (son of Pierre-Jean-Félix Brun (Note: Pierre-Jean-Félix Brun, farmer and landowner of Claix, near Grenoble, France, sold his land and entered business with his son Gaëtan, establishing companies in road transport and road-rolling, flour, grain and feed, and farm machinery rental. In 1883, he built a biscuit factory producing pain de guerre (biscuits with a long shelf life) with which the Brun name would become synonymous. See also (Brun (company) French))) and Alphonse Brun; the newly created company took steam tractors used to transport agricultural produce and put them into road construction service in between farming seasons. The first road-rolling contract was awarded in 1874. A new automated product, Bitulithe, (Note: Bitulithe : a tarmacadam- or asphalt concrete-like product, manufactured in situ by a portable machine.) was developed in 1911.

In 1920, the road-rolling entities were spun off into a separate company, Société Anonyme pour la Construction et l'Entretien des Routes (SACER). In the following two decades, the company expanded throughout France and into Algeria and Morocco.

In 1969, the Raveau-Cartier investment group (also a Colas stakeholder) took control of Sacer. In 1992, it became a Colas subsidiary, and in 2002 the Sacer holding company merged with Colas and three regional subsidiaries were formed: Sacer Atlantique, Sacer Paris-Nord-Est and Sacer Sud-Est.

=== Screg ===
In 1910 in Blaye, near Bordeaux, France, the JF Humarau & Cie. chemical company (founded in 1898 by Jean-Ferdinand and Louis Humarau) set up a tar distillation factory. In 1917, it became the Société Chimique de La Gironde (SCG), known as "La Gironde". From 1924, the company began to specialise in road construction products, producing bitumen emulsions by 1926, and operating over ten production plants by 1928.

During the 1930s, the company started road construction, and became the Société Chimique & Routière de la Gironde (SCRG) in 1936. In the next three decades, the company diversified into related business areas, including civil engineering and construction, and in 1964 was renamed Société Chimique Routière & d’Entreprise Générale (Screg). In 1979, the Screg Routes et Travaux Publics subsidiary was spun off, and during the 1980s Sacer and Colas became part of the same holding group as Screg. Screg Belgium was founded in 1989.

During the 1990s, the company became a Colas group subsidiary, and the Screg Routes road construction company became the Screg subsidiary. In 2006, Screg Belgium was renamed Colas Belgium.

=== Destia ===
In 2021 Colas took over the Finnish infrastructure construction company Destia from Finnish investment company Ahlström Capital, which acquired the formerly state owned Destia in 2014.
