= Second Abidjan Bridge =

Coordinates: 5.315845°N 4.010224°W

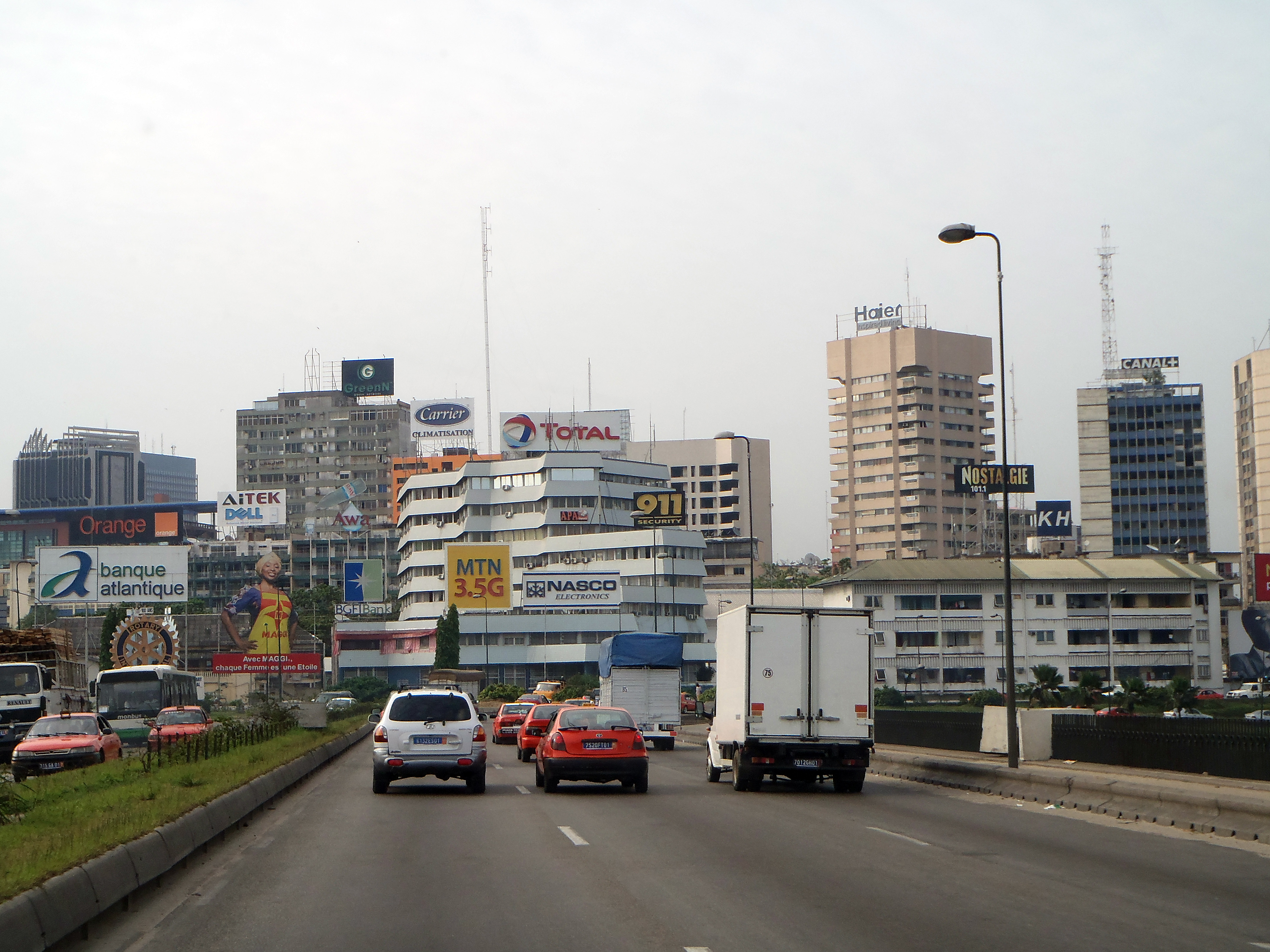
- On the Bridge
- Span range: 592 m
- Material: Precast prestressed concrete
- Movable: no
- Design effort: Boussiron
- Falsework required: No

Second Abidjan Bridge is a road bridge over the Ébrié Lagoon which links the two halves of the city of Abidjan in Côte d'Ivoire.

The structure is a girder bridge, hollow box bridge with ten spans, two spans of 35 m and eight spans of 58 m each thus resulting a total length of 592 m.
