= Ciel, mon mardi! =

French television talk show

Ciel, mon mardi! was a television talk show hosted by Christophe Dechavanne, which ran on French television TF1 every Tuesday at the beginning of the 1990s.

The title literally means "Heavens, it's my Tuesday!" but is also a wordplay on the more common Ciel, mon mari! expression, which means "Heavens, it's my husband!", which would have been uttered by a woman caught with another man by her husband.

Dechavanne invited groups of people who hated each other in real life to let them "discuss" their differences. For example, he would invite priests and homosexuals, Jewish groups and neo-Nazis, etc.
