= Martin Bouygues =

French businessperson (born 1952)

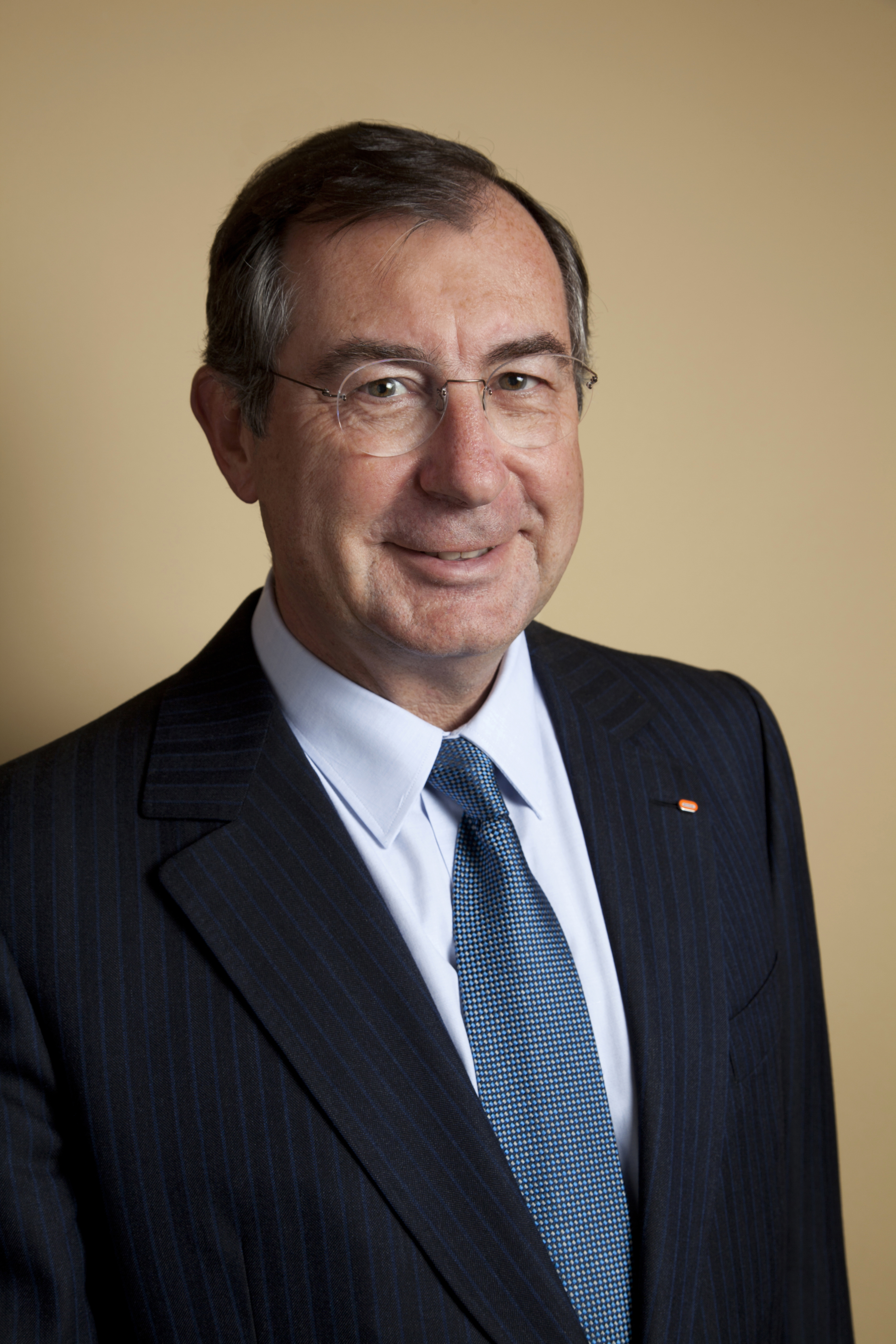
- Born: Martin Pierre Marie Bouygues; 3 May 1952 (age 73); Suresnes, France
- Occupation: Chairman Bouygues
- Children: 2
- Parent: Francis Bouygues
- Relatives: Olivier Bouygues (brother)

Martin Pierre Marie Bouygues (French pronunciation: [maʁtɛ̃ pjɛʁ maʁi bwiɡ]; born 3 May 1952) is the chairman and chief executive officer of the French company Bouygues, which employs around 130,000 people globally. It was founded by his father Francis Bouygues in 1952.

In 2015, he was ranked by Forbes as the world's 481st richest person, and is a billionaire.

== Beginnings ==
Martin Bouygues joined the Bouygues group with a high school diploma in 1974 as a works supervisor. After conducting works on site of the Forum des Halles in 1976, he was commissioned by his father to create a new subsidiary Maison Bouygues as a catalogue real estate business with his brother Nicolas. In 1982, he was appointed to Bouygues’ Board of Directors. In 1984, he was involved in the Bouygues group and Maison Bouygues' acquisition of SAUR, a French water treatment and distribution company. In 1986, he became chairman and CEO of Maison Bouygues. In 1987, he was appointed vice-chairman of the board.

While Nicolas Bouygues, the eldest son of Francis Bouygues and graduate engineer of the École Centrale Paris (like his father and his grandfather Georges Bouygues), was for a long time the designated successor to the paternal enterprise, his overly confrontational relations with other leaders of the group forced him to part ways to pursue his own business in 1986. Subsequently Martin assumed the position of CEO of the company on September 5, 1989.

== Management ==
In the 1990s, Martin, supported by a close circle of men of the late Francis Bouygues, developed the group's activities around three sectors: construction — especially at the international level, telecommunications (Bouygues Telecom in 1994) and media (TF1, LCI in 1994), but he was mainly credited as a worthy successor to the family business for his resistance to Vincent Bolloré's takeover attempt in 1997.

In the 2000s, he reinforced the group's investments in these strategic sectors through subsidiaries Bouygues Telecom and Colas and made a number of key management decisions, such as rejecting the initial bidding conditions for awarding a UMTS licence in France in 2001, as well as establishing a cooperation agreement with Alstom in 2006.

Since 2010, he has been a member of the Skolkovo Foundation Council.

Between 1993 and 2013, Bouygues expanded his group’s revenues by a factor of 3, from around 11 billion euros to 32.706 billion and was ranked as the 6th best performing CEO in the world by Harvard Business Review in November 2017.

== Commitment ==
In 2004, Martin Bouygues created the Francis Bouygues Foundation in memory of his father, founder of the group. This foundation helps high school students to pursue college education by offering them a scholarship.

In 2006, Martin Bouygues also initiated the support of his group for the United Nations Global Compact. This commitment reflects the group’s positioning in sustainable development and responsible policies.

== Personal life ==
Martin Bouygues is the father of three children: Edward, William and Charlotte. Since April 2016, Edward Bouygues joined the Board of Directors of Bouygues Group with his cousin Cyril, son of Olivier Bouygues, as permanent representatives.
