= Bouygues Telecom =

French telecommunications company

Bouygues Telecom S.A.
- Type: Private
- Industry: Telecommunications
- Founded: 4 October 1994; 32 years ago (company foundation); 30 May 1996; 30 years ago (launch of mobile services)
- Founder: Francis Bouygues
- Headquarters: Paris, France
- Area served: France
- Key people: Benoît Torloting (CEO); Richard Viel (Chairman of the Board of Directors)
- Services: Mobile network operator and Internet service provider
- Revenue: 8.98 billion euros (2025)
- Net income: 331 million euros (2025)
- Owner: Bouygues (90.53%); JCDecaux (9.47%)
- Number of employees: 10,700 (as of March 2026)
- Parent: Bouygues
- Website: www.bouyguestelecom.fr

Bouygues Telecom S.A. (French pronunciation: [bwiɡ telekɔm]) is a French mobile phone, Internet service provider and IPTV company, part of the Bouygues group. It is the third oldest mobile network operator in France, after Orange and SFR, and before Free Mobile, and provides 2G GSM, 3G UMTS, 4G LTE and 5G NR services. Its headquarters, designed by Arquitectonica and opened in 2011, is located at the border of Paris and Issy-les-Moulineaux near the River Seine.

== History ==
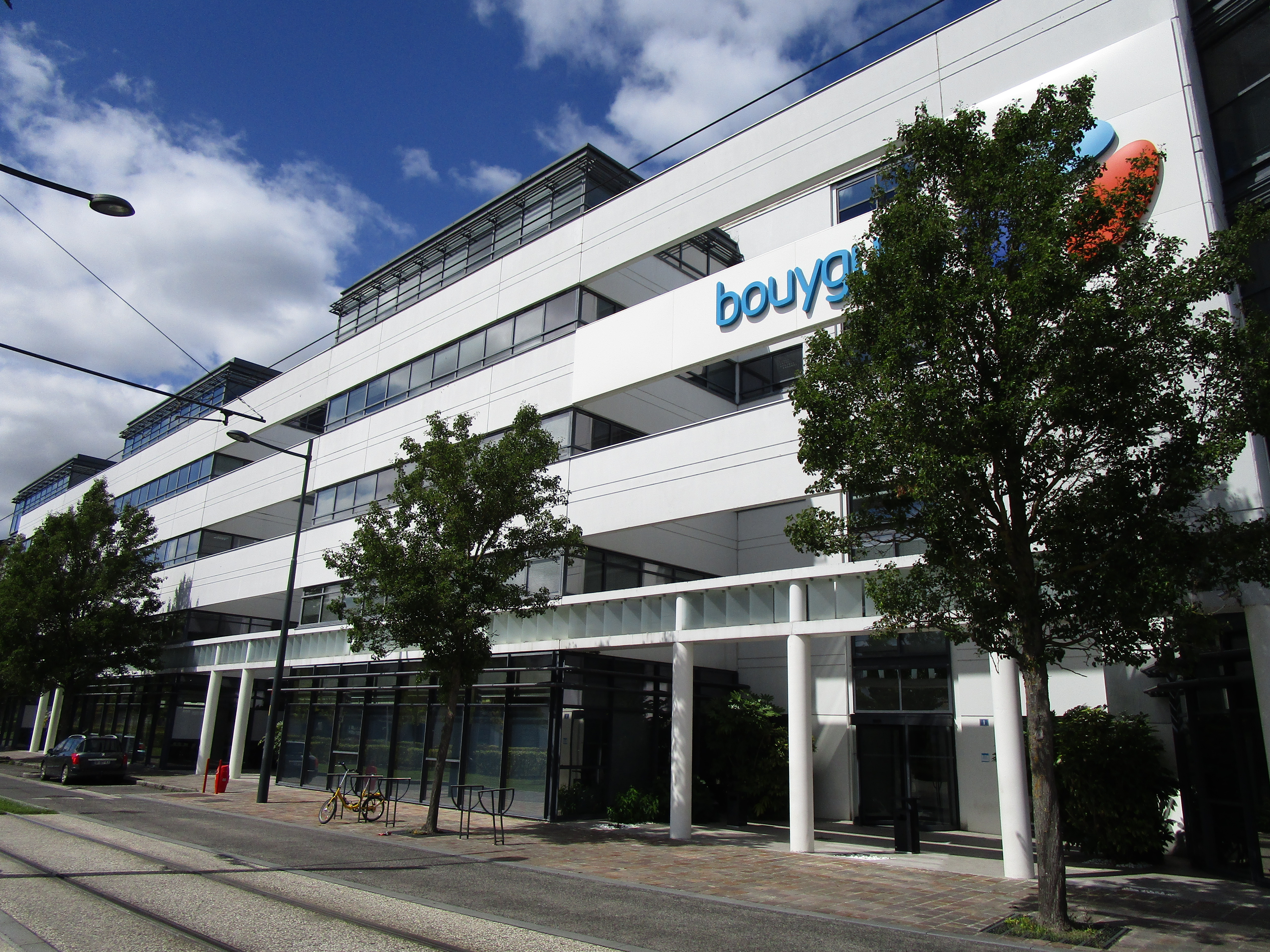
Branch office in Tours

Bouygues Telecom was authorised by the French government to build and operate France's third GSM mobile phone network on 4 December 1994, and commercially launched its network on 30 May 1996.

To compensate for its initial weaker coverage in comparison to the established providers, Orange and SFR, Bouygues Telecom's strategy included the extensive use of the 1800 MHz frequency band, which is more efficient in urban areas; the marketing of the first combo packages in May 1996; the launch of France's first SMS service in 1996 (which initially only between its subscribers and not billed until 1997); a free call recording function included in all packages from 15 January 1997; the launch of caller ID at the end of 1997, followed a few months later by its competitors; the launch of the "Millenium" package in November 1999 (the first in France to offer unlimited calls during the weekend); the launch of the "Spot" formula in March 2000, which offers several minutes of free talktime in exchange for advertising messages during communication; and the launch of France's first unlimited evening calling plan to all operators in 2006.

By 2001, Bouygues Telecom's market share reached approximately 17%. In that same year, the company surprised analysts by announcing its refusal to pay €4.96 billion to bid for a 3G wireless networking licence and stated its plans to deliver mobile internet connectivity using a combination of GPRS and EDGE, which are slower yet less-costly technologies in contrast to 3G. Furthermore, Bouygues Telecom negotiated with NTT DoCoMo regarding a potential partnership and the right to offer the latter's i-mode mobile internet service, which ultimately did not materialise.

In March 2005, the first DVB-H trials in France were carried out by Bouygues Telecom in cooperation with Orange and TPS. Two months later, Bouygues Telecom subsequently launched EDGE across its mobile network.

In 2008, Bouygues Telecom launched its first fixed line service; at the time, it reportedly had nine million customers and 7,700 employees. On 25 May 2009, Bouygues Telecom launched France's first converged quadruple play offer called "ideo", using a combined Internet modem and set-top box called Bbox; this model was subsequently copied by competitors Orange, SFR and Free Mobile. On 22 October 2010, the Bbox offer was expanded to include fibre Internet in cooperation with Numericable.

In 2010, through its subsidiary Nerem Telecom, Bouygues acquired HGT Telecom in exchange for $170 million from Henri Benezra and his brother Avi.

On 18 July 2011, Bouygues Telecom launched its lower-cost flanker brand called B&YOU, offering postpaid plans online without fixed contracts.

In March 2014, as part of its preparations to take over domestic competitor SFR, Bouygues Telecom agreed terms for the sale of its existing mobile network for €1.8 billion to Free on the condition that its larger bid succeeded. However, that same month, it was excluded from negotiations.

In June 2015, Bouygues publicly rejected an €10bn bid submitted by the Luxembourg-based telecoms firm Altice to purchase Bouygues Télécom from it. If the transaction had taken place, it would have created France's largest mobile phone operator although, according to Bouygues, there would have been concerns under France's competition law as well as financing issues that could have obstructed completion.

In January 2016, negotiations between Bouygues and the French mobile carrier Orange were held over the potential acquisition of Bouygues Telecom; one month later, Orange, SFR and Free announced the purchase of Bouygues Telecom; however, negotiations over the purchase agreement fell through a few months later.

In June 2020, Bouygues Telecom acquired Euro-Information Telecom, the MVNE for NRJ Mobile, Auchan Telecom, Cdiscount Mobile, CIC Mobile and Crédit Mutuel Mobile, and subsequently renamed the latter as Bouygues Telecom Business – Distribution in early 2021. One year later, the company declared its ambition to become the second biggest mobile provider in France by 2026.

In 2024, France's regulator approved the acquisition of La Poste Mobile by Bouygues Telecom.

In 2025, Bouygues Telecom was subject to public criticism over its introduction of a new "unsubscription fee" of about €5. Few months ago, it added a €2 additional fees by default for all customers, for the customer service by phone. Later that same year, the operator launched its 40GB worldwide mobile offer, for new customers, providing the possibility to get 40GB of mobile internet, in a 112 countries around the globe. It does not include phone calls, though.

On 14 October 2025, a consortium composed of Orange, Bouygues Telecom and Iliad (owner of Free) offered €17 billion to buy SFR from Altice, which was rejected. However, on 17 April 2026, a revised offer of €20.35 billion was accepted; Bouygues Telecom will own 41%, Free 31% and Orange 27% of the company.

== Legal issues ==
=== Antitrust litigation ===
Along with Orange and SFR, Bouygues Telecom was, in 2005, found by the Autorité de la concurrence (the French competition body) to have acted against the best interests of consumers and the economy by sharing confidential information between 1997 and 2003. The three companies were collectively fined €535 million in total. In 2007, Bouygues Telecom's action to have the ruling annulled was largely unsuccessful.

=== Court order for equipment removal ===
In February 2009, the company was ordered to take down a mobile phone mast due to uncertainty about its effect on health. Residents in the commune Charbonnières in the Rhône department had sued the company claiming adverse health effects from the radiation emitted by the 19-meter-tall (62 ft) antenna. The milestone ruling by the Versailles Court of Appeal reversed the burden of proof which is usual in such cases by emphasizing the extreme divergence between different countries in assessing safe limits for such radiation. The court stated that, "Considering that, while the reality of the risk remains hypothetical, it becomes clear from reading the contributions and scientific publications produced in debate and the divergent legislative positions taken in various countries, that uncertainty over the harmlessness of exposure to the waves emitted by relay antennas persists and can be considered serious and reasonable".

== Bicycle racing team ==
They sponsored the bicycle racing team Bbox Bouygues Telecom from 2005 to 2010.

== See also ==
- List of mobile network operators in Europe
