= Central Middlesex Hospital =

Hospital in London

Coordinates: 51.53103°N 0.26914°W

- London North West University Healthcare NHS Trust
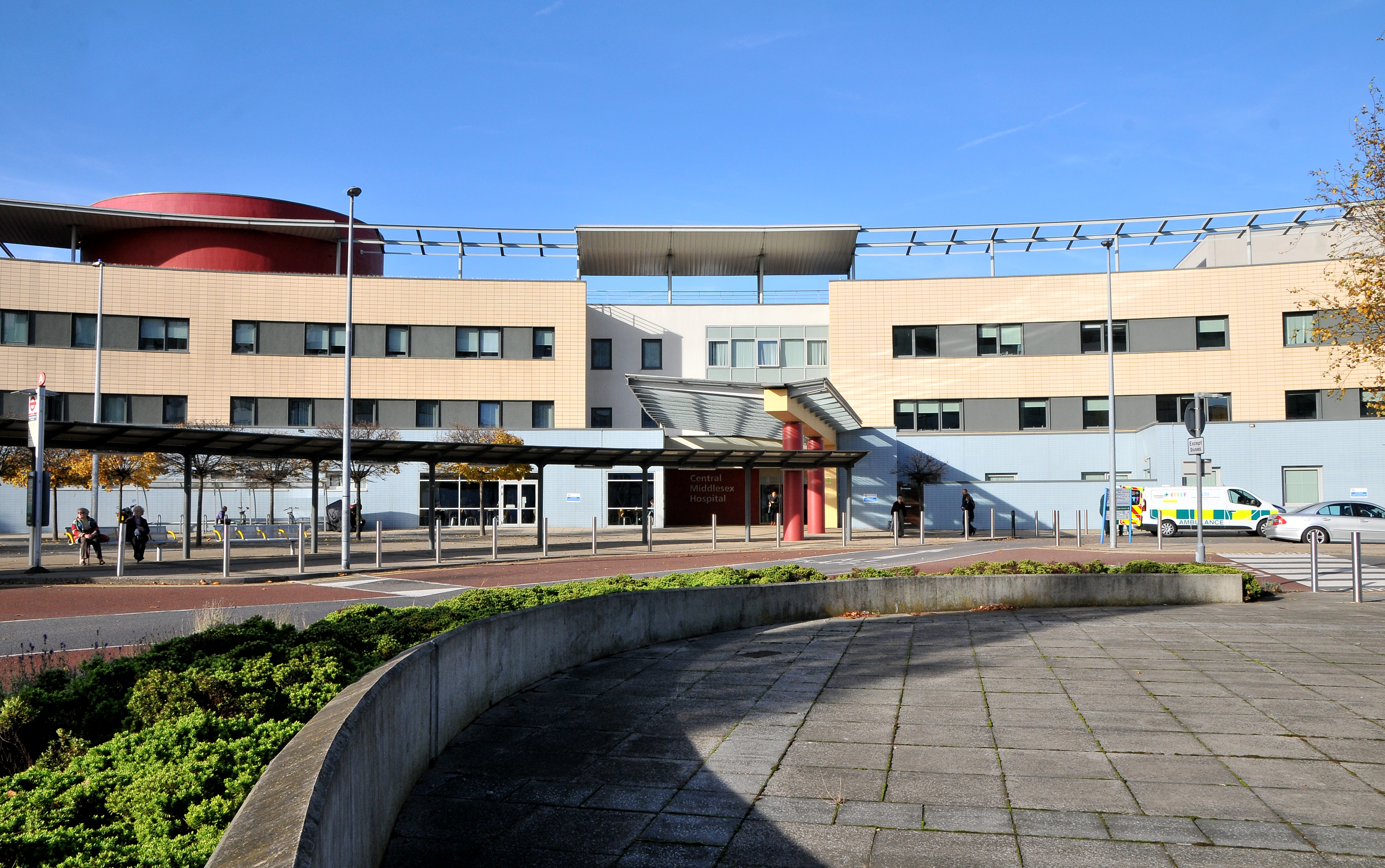
- Main entrance

Geography
- Location: Acton Lane, Park Royal, London NW10 7NS, England

Organisation
- Care system: National Health Service
- Type: District general
- Affiliated university: Imperial College London

Services
- Emergency department: No
- Beds: 214

Links
- Website: www.lnwh.nhs.uk/central-middlesex-hospital
- Lists: Hospitals in England

Central Middlesex Hospital is in the centre of the Park Royal business estate, on the border of two London boroughs, Brent and Ealing. It is managed by the London North West University Healthcare NHS Trust.

== History ==
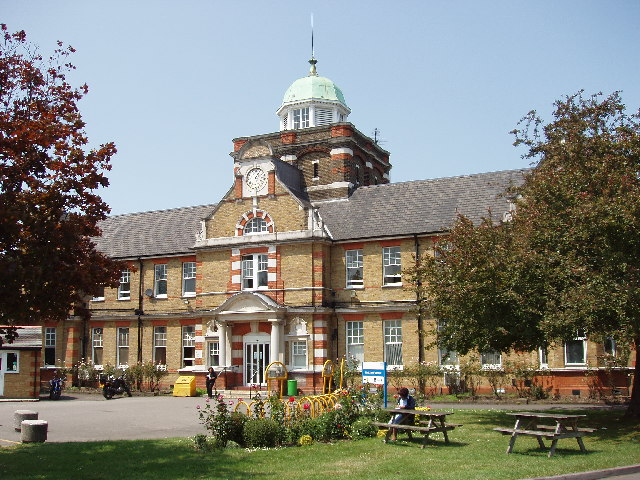
The old hospital, now largely demolished

The hospital was established as an infirmary for sick paupers at the Willesden Workhouse in 1903. Extensions were built in 1908, 1911 and 1914. The facility became the Willesden Institution in 1914, the Park Royal Hospital in 1921 and the Central Middlesex County Hospital in 1931.

In 1933 a new children's ward was opened by Sir George Newman. The ward, which had 105 beds, had an innovative design, and attracted interested overseas visitors. The ward was three storeys high with opening glass windows, walls decorated to half height by picture tiles and fireplaces surrounded by nursery rhyme tiles. The tiles were made by W.B. Simpson and Son.

The hospital was badly damaged by enemy bombing during the Second World War. After the hospital joined the National Health Service in 1948, major additions included a maternity unit opened in 1966 and Ambulatory Care and Diagnostic Centre for out-patients opened in 1999.

Extensive new facilities were procured under a Private Finance Initiative contract in 2003. Under this scheme, while the Ambulatory Care and Diagnostic Centre built only a few years earlier was retained, most of the rest of the buildings on the site were demolished and a new Brent Emergency Care and Diagnostic Centre was created. The works, which were designed by HLM Architects and Avanti Architects and carried out by Bouygues at a cost of £60 million, opened in 2006.

== See also ==
- List of hospitals in England
- Patrick Mackay – serial killer who was born at the hospital in 1952
