= Radio Harrow =

British charity radio station

- Founded: 2015
- Founders: Matt Blank; Keith Chilvers; Ben Hart
- Type: Charitable incorporated organisation
- Registration no.: England & Wales (1161203)
- Location(s): Radio Harrow; Northwick Park Hospital; Watford Road; Harrow; HA1 3UJ; UK
- Origins: Harrow, England (UK)
- Region served: London Boroughs of Brent, Harrow and Ealing
- Volunteers: 150
- Website: www.radioharrow.org

Radio Harrow is a local charity radio station for Harrow, London, England, promoting health and wellbeing within the local community through its broadcasting and NHS befriending service. Registered charity number 1161203.

== Objectives ==
The charity launched in April 2015 after two local broadcasters, Radio Northwick Park and Harrow Community Radio, came together. The two organisations had previously worked in partnership over a number of years in the lead up to the creation of Radio Harrow, sharing broadcasts, volunteers, as well as Trustees and Directors. Now combined, the new organisation has 150 volunteers, two studios, a production area, equipment to enable it to broadcast via the Internet and FM waveband and the ability to produce outside broadcasts from anywhere within the London Boroughs of Brent, Harrow and Ealing.

The radio station engages with the general public by broadcasting a mix of local and regional information, which relates to the health and wellbeing of the local community and helps people shape their local area. It also provides a voice for local residents and organisation groups to make a positive difference to the community they serve and help make it a friendly and enjoyable place to live.

The objectives of the charity are:

- The relief of sickness, poor health and old age amongst people living in the London Boroughs of Brent, Harrow and Ealing by providing a local broadcasting service for hospitals, residential homes and similar institutions, and for patients receiving community care; and
- The advancement of health and prevention or relief of sickness for the public benefit through the promotion of the benefits of living a healthy lifestyle, and the importance of maintaining good personal mental and physical health by (mainly, but not exclusively) the means of broadcasting health education messages to people living in the London Boroughs of Brent, Harrow and Ealing.

As well as the new charitable objectives, there are several areas the charity focuses on, which centre around health and wellbeing within the community. These are:

- Broadcasting
- A Befriending Service
- Education
- Social Integration, and;
- Becoming the Voice for Harrow

The befriending service is provided to the London North West Healthcare NHS Trust. Currently concentrating on Northwick Park Hospital, the service is set to grow to the other hospitals the Trust covers, Ealing and Central Middlesex. The radio station is a member of the Hospital Broadcasting Association and Community Media Association.

== History ==
Radio Harrow is the coming together of two organisations in Harrow. Radio Northwick Park and Harrow Community Radio.

Radio Northwick Park (known as RNP) was a Hospital Radio charity run by volunteers to provide patient visiting and a broadcast entertainment service to the North West London Hospitals NHS Trust. In the 44 years of its existence it grew in strength and became one of the first hospital radio stations in the UK to broadcast 24 hours a day and online. The volunteers visited over 15,000 patients a year to help make their stay in hospital as comfortable and enjoyable as it can be and then broadcast back personalised shows in the form of a daily request show, alongside their regular broadcasting, aimed at entertaining the patients.

RNP was founded by a group of volunteers from the Jewish Youth Voluntary Service, who set up a hospital radio service at Harrow Hospital on Roxeth Hill. With no room for a permanent studio, programmes were only broadcast on Sundays and volunteers installed and dismantled the equipment weekly. In 1971 a permanent studio was built in the basement of the new Northwick Park Hospital and RNP went on air in April 1971. During their existence they regularly became the radio of choice for patients to listen to, beating rivals such as BBC Radio and London commercial stations.

Harrow Community Radio (known as HCR) was a non-profit Community radio in the United Kingdom setup in 2010 to engage with those who live and work in the local community. It acted as a platform for the community to have a voice, which may not otherwise have been heard. In the five years of its existence it created firm ties with the local authority, businesses, community, charity groups and educational institutions, to become the go to people to host community events and summer schemes. It ran a full 28-day Restricted Service Licence, broadcasting over FM and not just via the Internet.

== See also ==
- Hospital Broadcasting Association
- Northwick Park Hospital
