= Francis Bouygues =

French businessman and film producer

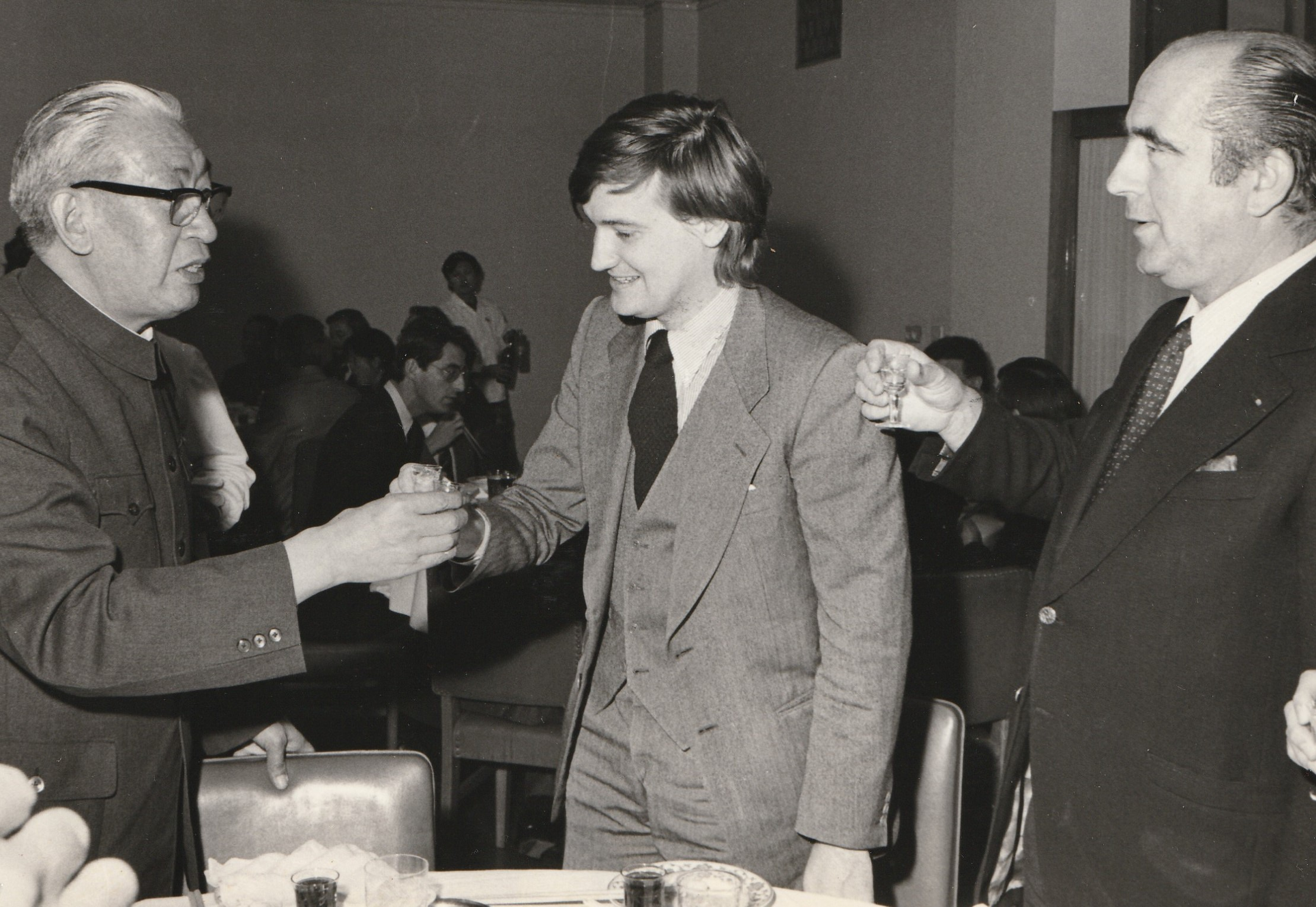
- Francis Bouygues in 1978 in Beijing with Wang Yao-Ting, President of the Chinese Council for International Trade, and journalist Bernard Le Grelle.
- Born: 5 December 1922; Paris, France
- Died: 25 July 1993 (aged 70); Saint-Malo, Brittany, France
- Education: École Centrale Paris
- Occupation: Businessman
- Children: 4 (including Martin Bouygues)

Francis Bouygues (French pronunciation: [fʁɑ̃sis bwiɡ]; 5 December 1922 – 25 July 1993) was a French businessman and film producer. He founded the industrial company Bouygues in 1952 and ran it until 1989, when his son Martin Bouygues succeeded him.

== Biography ==
=== Early life ===
Francis Bouygues was born on December 5, 1922, in Auvergne. He graduated with an engineer's degree from École Centrale Paris in 1946.

=== Career ===
In 1952, at the age of 29, he founded Entreprise Francis Bouygues, an industrial works and building company. In 1959, he founded Stim, a property development subsidiary of Entreprise Francis Bouygues.

In 1990, he founded Ciby 2000, a film production company with his son Martin Bouygues. They produced many films including The Piano.

He died aged 70 of a heart attack on July 25, 1993, in Saint-Malo, Brittany.

=== Personal life ===
He was married to Monique Tézé and they had four children: Corinne (1947), Nicolas (1949), Olivier (1950), Martin (1952). He had lung cancer in 1976, but survived.
