= Northwick Park Hospital =

Coordinates: 51.576°N 0.322°W

- London North West University Healthcare NHS Trust
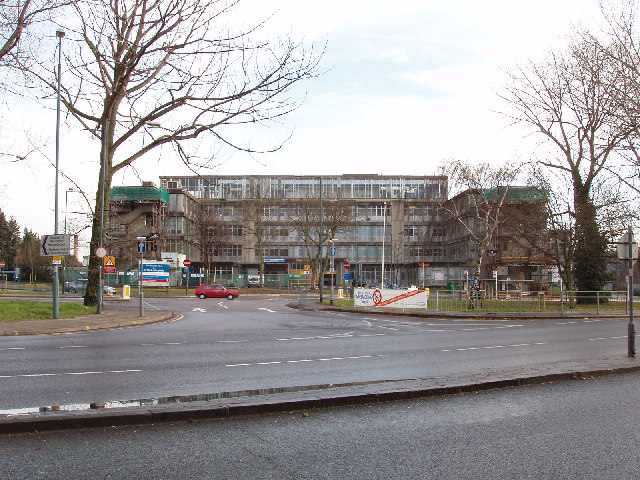

- Location within Brent

Geography
- Location: Watford Road, Harrow HA1 3UJ, London, England

Organisation
- Care system: NHS England
- Type: District General
- Affiliated university: Imperial College London

Services
- Emergency department: Yes
- Beds: ~500

History
- Founded: 10 October 1970; 56 years ago

Links
- Website: https://www.lnwh.nhs.uk/northwick-park-hospital
- Lists: Hospitals in England

Northwick Park Hospital (NWPH) is a major National Health Service hospital situated in the town of Harrow, North West London, managed by the London North West University Healthcare NHS Trust. It is located off Watford Road in the London Borough of Brent; on the border of the London Borough of Harrow.

== History ==
The hospital was commissioned by the North West Metropolitan Regional Hospital Board in the late 1960s, designed by the British architect John Weeks and built by Trollope & Colls. The design of the hospital was largely inspired by British obsolescence studies, in which a loose-jointed medical complex was created with flexibility to withstand obsolescence's unpredictable effects. With only a fixed internal street system, the architects referred to the hospital as "an indeterminate architecture" with "no final plan" – free to grow and change over time. It was opened by the Queen on 10 October 1970. It takes its name from Northwick Park, which lies besides the hospital.

In 1994, St Mark's Hospital, previously located 10 miles away in central London, moved into a wing of the hospital formerly occupied by the Medical Research Council.

In 1997, the hospital returned the worst figures for operations cancelled in the UK. The closure of Edgware General Hospital earlier that year was cited by some as a reason.

In 2005, the hospital's maternity department was named as having one of the highest death rates in the United Kingdom. During the period April 2002 to March 2004, the maternal death rate for the maternity unit was 74.2 per 100,000, 6.5 times the national average of 11.4 per 100,000, as reported by Cemach (Confidential Enquiry into Maternal and Child Health). A range of "special measures" designed to improve maternity services and public confidence in the services was agreed with the Trust and these were all complied with within a year, but as of 2016 the Trust's maternity and gynaecology services were rated as "requires improvement" by the Care Quality Commission.

A 2016 Care Quality Commission report rated Northwick Park Hospital as "requires improvement" overall, with only one out of eight assessment areas attaining a better rating. The report highlighted a number of concerns found during inspection visits, including that surgical staff were not always reporting incidents, patients experienced long waits, compliance with safeguarding training was poor, examples of poor infection control practice, a poor environment on the stroke wards, and that nutrition and hydration was poorly managed. The Commission subsequently issued the Trust with a Section 29 (A) warning notice.

== Facilities ==
The hospital provides a full range of services including paediatrics, maxillofacial, orthopaedics, neurology, cardiology, elderly care medicine and a regional rehabilitation unit for patients with additional ongoing acute medical needs. St Mark's Hospital, a national centre of gastrointestinal medicine, is based at the same site, as is the British Olympic Association's Olympic Medical Institute.

Local charity Radio Harrow is based within the hospital and has provided a patient visiting and broadcasting service since 1971.

Northwick Park is one of the few hospitals in England to have a paternoster lift transport system. Despite being out of use for several years, it was brought back into service during 2020.

== Research ==
Medical research has been conducted at Northwick Park Hospital since its founding. In 1994, some research programs were formalised into an independent charity, Northwick Park Institute for Medical Research (NPIMR), which now operates under the brand name of The Griffin Institute. The institute, founded by Colin Green, does translational research.

=== TGN incident ===
On 13 March 2006, six men in a clinical trial at the independent Parexel drug trial unit (which is not run by London North West Healthcare NHS Trust) became severely unwell following administration of theralizumab during a first-in-human clinical trial. They were transferred to the intensive therapy unit at Northwick Park. Affected patients developed multi-organ failure and required intensive medical support by the critical care team at Northwick Park, led by Dr Ganesh Suntharalingam.

== Notable staff and patients ==
- Simon Le Bon worked as a theatre porter at Northwick Park Hospital before becoming the lead singer for Duran Duran.
- "Jeeves", the UK's first ever robot nurse, worked at the hospital for six months in 1996-1997 until it "failed" its probation period.
- General Augusto Pinochet was a patient at Northwick Park Hospital in January 2000 while fighting extradition for murder and torture.

== In popular culture ==
Northwick Park is the setting for the Channel 4 British sitcom Green Wing.

The hospital features in the seventh series of ITV's Prime Suspect.

The hospital interiors in the 1976 film The Omen, together with the exterior scene in which Katherine Thorn falls from a window and crashes into a parked ambulance, were filmed at Northwick Park Hospital.

Northwick Park Hospital features in the ITV2 reality show Emergency Nurses, which started airing in June 2022.

== See also ==
- Healthcare in London
- List of hospitals in England
- Mount Vernon Hospital
- Royal National Orthopaedic Hospital
