= Bouygues =

French industrial group

Bouygues S.A.
- Type: Public
- Traded as: Euronext Paris: EN; CAC 40 component
- ISIN: FR0000120503
- Industry: Conglomerate
- Founded: 1952; 74 years ago
- Founder: Francis Bouygues
- Headquarters: 8th arrondissement, Paris, France
- Key people: Martin Bouygues (chairman); Olivier Roussat (CEO)
- Revenue: ▲€56.9 billion (2025)
- Operating income: ▲€2.33 billion (2025)
- Net income: ▲€1.14 billion (2025)
- Number of employees: 196,184 (2025)
- Subsidiaries: Bouygues Construction; Bouygues Immobilier; Bouygues Télécom; Equans; Colas Group; TF1 Group (43.7%)
- Website: bouygues.com

Bouygues S.A. (French pronunciation: [bwiɡ]) is a French engineering group headquartered in the 8th arrondissement of Paris, France. Bouygues is listed on the Euronext Paris exchange and is a blue chip in the CAC 40 stock market index. The group specialises in construction (Colas Group and Bouygues Construction), real estate development (Bouygues Immobilier), media (TF1 Group), and telecommunications (Bouygues Telecom).

The company was founded in 1952 by Francis Bouygues and quickly secured construction opportunities from the French state, leading to it being involved in social housing (starting in 1955) and the French motorway system (starting in the 1960s). It listed on the Paris Stock Exchange in 1970 and started to diversify and internationalise during the years thereafter. During the 1980s, Bouygues acquired Screg, Sacer, and Colas. On 29 May 1996, it launched Bouygues Télécom. In 2006, the company acquired 23.26 percent of the French conglomerate Alstom. Since 1989, the company has been led by Francis Bouygues's son, Martin Bouygues, while Martin's older brother, Olivier Bouygues, is a board member.

== History ==
Bouygues was founded in 1952 by Francis Bouygues, amid the reconstruction of France in the aftermath of the Second World War, to construct new buildings. Within its first two decades of operation, the company secured considerable work from the French government across several different reconstruction programmes. These included the construction of new social housing starting in 1955, the building out of the French motorway system during the 1960s, and the securing of several high-profile contracts for specific buildings, including the Parc des Princes stadium, the Palais des congrès de Paris shopping mall, and Charles de Gaulle Airport amongst others.

In 1970, Bouygues was listed on the Paris Stock Exchange. In the following decade, the company endeavoured to develop an international presence as well as to diversify its activities. Furthermore, during the mid 1980s, Bouygues acquired several other domestic engineering and construction companies, including Screg, Sacer, and Colas; (Note: Colas became a direct subsidiary of Bouygues in 2000, after a share swap made Bouygues the direct owner) which was later reorganised as Colas Group. In 1987, the company started operating the television channel TF1. One year later, Bouygues moved into its new head office, the Challenger complex, in Saint-Quentin en Yvelines.

On 29 May 1996, the company launched Bouygues Télécom as France's third mobile telephone operator. In the early 2000s, it was decided to refocus Bouygues's activities around the construction, telecoms and media markets. In relation to this strategic direction, the firm divested Bouygues Offshore to the Italian oil services specialist Saipem in 2002, as well as Saur to French private equity company PAI Partners in exchange for €1bn in November 2004. During June 2006, the company acquired 23.26 percent of the French industrial conglomerate Alstom.

In 2008, Bouygues Telecom launched its first fixed line service; at the time, it had 9 million customers and 7,700 employees. In 2010, through its subsidiary Nerem Telecom, Bouygues acquired HGT Telecom in exchange for $170 million from Henri Benezra and his brother Avi.

In June 2014, consecutively to Alstom's cession of its Energy activities to General Electric, Bouygues granted a call option to the French government, allowing it to acquire a maximum of 20 percent of Alstom, currently owned by the group. In June 2015, Bouygues publicly rejected an €10bn bid submitted by the Luxembourg-based telecoms firm Altice to purchase Bouygues Télécom from it.

In May 2018, the company purchased the Australian construction company A. W. Edwards. In December 2019, Bouygues became a shareholder in Flying Whales, a French company developing rigid-structure airships for heavy-lift transport as part of a consortium of industrial investors including Groupe ADP and Air Liquide.

In November 2021, Bouygues acquired the technical services business, Equans from Engie in a transaction worth €7.1bn.

== Business structure ==
The company carries out the following businesses:

=== Construction ===
- Bouygues Construction (100% share): construction, public works, energy & services, with a presence in 80 countries worldwide
- Colas Group (96.8% share): roadworks, construction, railways and maintenance
- Bouygues Immobilier (100% share): residential, corporate, commercial and hotel real estate and urban development, property development

=== Telecoms - Media ===
- Bouygues Télécom (90.5% share): mobile phone and fixed line operator
- TF1 Group (43.7% share): audiovisual group; with TF1 and 9 other TV channels.

=== Transportation ===
- BINA Istra (30.15% total ownership): Croatian joint stock company founded in 1995 to facilitate construction and subsequent management of an Istrian Y motorway

=== Technical services ===
- Equans

== Financial data ==
Financial data in millions of euros
Year	2001 (NF)	2002	2003	2004 (IFRS)	2005	2006	2007	2008	2009	2010	2011	2012	2013	2014	2015	2016	2017	2018	2019	2020	2021	2022	2023	2024	2025
Sales	20,473	22,247	21,822	20,815	23,983	26,408	29,588	32,713	31,353	31,225	32,706	33,547	33,345	33,138	32,428	31,768	32,904	35,555	37,929	34,694	37,589	44,322	56,017	56,752	56,877
Net profit	344	666	450	909	832	1,246	1,376	1,501	1319	1,071	1,070	633	647	807	403	732	1,085	1,311	1,184	696	1,125	973	1,040	1,058	1,138
Net debt	1,124	3,201	2,786	1,680	2,352	4,176	4,288	4,916	2,704	2,473	3,862	4,172	4,427	3,216	2,561	1,866	1,914	3,657	2,222	1,981	941	7,440	6,251	6,066	4,204
employees	126,560	118,892	124,300	113,334	115,441	122,561	136,700	145,150	133,971	133,456	130,827	133,780	128,067	127,470	120,254	117,997	115,530	129,275	130,500	129,000	124,600	147,443	201,405	200,862	196,184

Source : Bouygues

== Major construction projects ==
Bouygues has been involved in many major construction projects including

=== Europe ===
- The Parc des Princes completed in 1972
- The Tour First in 1974
- The Musée d'Orsay completed in 1986
- The Île de Ré bridge completed in 1988
- The Grande Arche completed in 1989
- The Channel Tunnel completed in 1994
- The Bibliothèque nationale de France completed in 1995
- The Pont de Normandie completed in 1995,
- The Stade de France completed in 1998
- The expansion of Barnet Hospital completed in 2002
- The redevelopment of West Middlesex University Hospital completed in 2003
- The Brent Emergency Care and Diagnostic Centre completed in 2006
- The expansion of Broomfield Hospital in Chelmsford completed in 2010
- The expansion of North Middlesex University Hospital completed in 2010

Bouygues is also involved in HS2 lot C1, working as part of joint venture, due to complete in 2031.

=== Africa ===
- The Hassan II Mosque in Casablanca, Morocco completed in 1992
- The Henri Konan Bédié Bridge in Abidjan, Ivory Coast completed in 2014

=== North America ===
- The company also built the Port of Miami Tunnel completed in 2014.
- Construction of the Iqaluit Airport terminal in Nunavut, Canada, completed in 2017.

=== Asia ===
- The Gypjak Mosque in Turkmenistan, completed in 2004.
- The Singapore Sports Hub completed in 2014
- LRT Line 1 Cavite Extension due to be completed in 2025

== Head office ==
Bouygues head office in Paris

The Bouygues head office is located at 32 Avenue Hoche in the 8th arrondissement of Paris. The American architect Kevin Roche worked on this building, as well as the previous head office location, the Challenger complex in Saint-Quentin-en-Yvelines. This complex, situated in a 30 hectares (74 acres) tract in Guyancourt, is now occupied by Bouygues Construction, one of the group's subsidiaries.

== Group and values ==
=== Social and environmental commitment ===
Since 2006, Bouygues has participated in the United Nations Global Compact. The group sponsors The Shift Project think tank, with several other companies such as EDF, BNP Paribas or Saint-Gobain, which promotes sustainable economic development.

== Controversies ==
=== Bid rigging ===
In September 2023, Bouygues Construction Expertises Nucléaires (BCEN) was fined €6.2 million after the French competition regulator found them guilty, along with five other companies, of bid rigging over tenders for work at the Marcoule nuclear site.

=== Bouygues (UK) Ltd. v Dahl-Jensen (UK) Ltd. ===
In this UK construction adjudication matter, the company's UK subsidiary had terminated the employment of its mechanical sub-contractor, Dahl-Jensen (UK). The adjudicator made a mistake in calculating outstanding payments due to Dahl-Jensen, which led to a Court of Appeal ruling in 2002 which stated that

... when an Adjudicator makes an error in calculating an amount payable to a party, the effect of which is to pay monies which are not due under the contract, that decision would not be void provided the Adjudicator had answered the issue that has been asked of him.

=== Flamanville ===
Between 2009 and 2011, Bouygues S.A. was illegally employing workers from Poland and Romania exposing them to inhuman working conditions at the construction site of the Flamanville nuclear power plant in Normandy. The company was later condemned for their practices before the court in Cherbourg and was ordered to pay sanctions of between €25,000 and €29,950.

=== Cyberattack on Bouygues Construction SA ===
On 30 January 2020, a ransomware-type virus was detected on Bouygues Construction's computer network although operational activity on the construction sites was disrupted. The "Maze Ransomware Gang" claimed responsibility for the attack and posted a 1.2 GB file that allegedly contained data taken from Bouygues Construction.
