= List of schools in Abidjan =

This list of schools in Abidjan includes the principal private and public schools in Abidjan, the economic capital of the Ivory Coast.

== Preschool education ==
Includes schools designated in French as "Jardin d'enfant" and "école maternelle" :

=== Public preschools ===
- Centre de la petite enfance du programme 6 (Cocody)
- Centre de protection de la petite enfance (Cocody)
- École maternelle Hoba Hélène (cocody riviéra palmeraie)
- Centre de la petite enfance du programme (koumassi)

=== Private schools ===
- Institut LKM de Yopougon
- École Maternelle La Rosette
- Groupe scolaire Arc-en-Ciel du Plateau Dokui
- École Les papillons II Plateaux
- Institut Libanais d'Enseignement (I.L.E.)
- Garderie Bébé Calin
- Groupe Scolaire DUBASS (Riviera-Faya, Route de Bingerville, Abidjan)

== Primary education ==
=== Private primary schools ===
Groupe scolaire les Papillons - Abidjan 2plateaux

- Complexe Educatif Marie Auzey cocody Angre ecole prescolaire et primaire
- Groupe scolaire victoire
- (Yopougon)
- La Farandole Internationale, a Mission Laïque Française (MLF) school (French school)
- Institut LKM de Yopougon
- Lycée International Jean-Mermoz, A part of the MLF
- Complexe Éducatif Marie Auzey (Cycle préscolaire et primaire)
- Cours Lamartine (école française)
- Cours Sévigné (école française)
- École du ^{43e} BIMA (French school)
- École les sept nains
- École les pitchounes
- École Konan Raphael
- École primaire militaire
- École le nid de Cocody
- École la Volière de Biétry
- École primaire de la pépinière de Cocody les Deux-Plateaux (French school)
- École primaire de l'eau vive Zone 4 (French school - Closed since November 2004)
- École internationale Jules Verne (French school)
- Groupe scolaire Antoine de Saint-Exupéry de Yopougon
- Groupe scolaire Arc-en-Ciel du Plateau Dokui
- Groupe scolaire de Cocody-Riviera
- Groupe scolaire Jacques Prévert (French school)
- Groupe Scolaire DUBASS (Riviera-Faya, Route de Bingerville, Abidjan)
- Groupe scolaire Offoumou de Yopougon
- Jeanifa school de Cocody-Angré
- Lycée Blaise Pascal
- Groupe scolaire Fred et Poppee (Cocody Djibi 8^{e} Tranche)
- Groupe scolaire baptiste William Carrey (Port-Bouët)
- Groupe scolaire baptiste Grâce divine (Koumassi)
- Lycée Maurice Delafosse
- Institut Libanais d'Enseignement (I.L.E.)
- Groupe Scolaire Bilingue Les Papillons (Angré 7^{e})
- Groupe Scolaire les Anges Blancs Marcory
- Groupe Scolaire les Industriels Yopougon Zone Industrielle Micao
- Groupe scolaire Alghadir Riviera
- Groupe scolaire Alghadir Bietry
- Ecole libanaise en Côte d'Ivoire zone4

=== Public primary schools ===
- EPP Marcory 1
- Collège Sainte Alliance (Koumassi)
- Ecole primaire Vridi Cité
- Ecole primaire Vridi Chapelle
- École primaire Vridi Collectif
- École primaire Vridi Lagune
- Cours Castaing
- École Saint-Paul
- École Saint-Michel
- École Saint Jean Bosco de Treichville
- École Sainte-Anne de Port-Bouët
- Groupe Scolaire Gandhi Yopougon Toits Rouges
- Groupe Scolaire les Hirondelles Abobo Sagbé
- Victor Loba'd
- EPP Liberté Adjamé
- EPP Paillet Adjamé

== Secondary education ==
=== Public collèges ===
(lower secondary schools, equivalent of British high school or US middle school)

- Collège du Plateau
- Collège Moderne de Yopougon
- Collège Jean-Mermoz
- Collège William Ponty
- Collège André Malraux
- Collège Anador d'Abobo
- Collège Victor Schœlcher
- Collège GSR Riviera Golf
- Collège BAD de Koumassi
- Collège moderne d'Adjamé
- Collège Newton de Yopougon
- Collège d'orientation de Cocody
- École Militaire Préparatoire Technique de Bingerville (EMPT)
- Collège « Les phalènes » de Yopougon
- Collège Anador d'Abobo
- Collège moderne de l'autoroute de Treichville
- Collège moderne d'Abobo
- Collège moderne du Plateau
- College moderne la colombe de koumassi
- College moderne pascal de koumassi

=== Private collèges ===
- La Farandole Internationale, a Mission laïque française (MLF) school (French school)
- Collège Enko Riviera
- Collège Notre Dame d'Afrique de Bietry
- Collège Sainte Foi d'Abidjan
- Cours secondaire catholique petit séminaire de Bingerville
- Collège Guchanrolain de Yopougon
- Collège D BAZ de Yopougon - Andokoi
- Groupe scolaire EPD (Education.Paix.Développement) d'Abobo
- Cours secondaire méthodiste de Cocody
- Collège Voltaire Marcory
- Cours secondaire méthodiste du Plateaucollège collège la vendière
- école nouvelle ivoirienne cocody angre (general Education lower secondary school)
- École Notre-Dame d'Afrique
- École Notre-Dame des Apôtres
- Collège Notre-Dame de la Paix du Plateau
- Collège privé shalom du Plateau
- Groupe scolaire Arc-en-Ciel du Plateau Dokui
- Collège Saba & fils de Yopougon Ananeraie
- Collège Saint-Jean Bosco
- Collège Voltaire Treichville
- Groupe Écoles Alfred Nobel Marcory
- Collège privé Bougainville
- Collège institut Froebel de Marcory
- Institut libanais d'enseignement (I.L.E.)
- INSTITUT SCOLAIRE SECONDAIRE ESSEGOU AKA ABOBO
- Collège Iris 1 Abobo
- Collège Iris 2 Avocatier
- Collège Moderne Descartes
- COLLÈGE LES PINGOUINS ABOBO SOGEFIHA
- fUSOS Cours Sociaux Abobo
- Collège ibc abobo
- Collège Abraham Agneby Abobo
- Collège Saint Étienne Abobo
- Collège Sainte Camille
- Collège Saint Viateur
- Collège la Pérouse
- Collège le Figuier
- Collège Thanon Namanko
- Collège Commandant Cousteau
- Collège Sainte Camille
- École Nouvelle Ivoirienne Cocody Angré. [ENICA]

Note : Here "French school" means a school approved by the French Ministry of National Education, as part of an agreement or convention with the Agency for French Education Abroad (AEFE)

=== Public lycées ===
(Upper secondary schools, equivalent of British sixth form colleges or North American high schools)

- Lycée Municipal de Bonoua
- Lycée Moderne de Bonoua
- Lycée Aimé Césaire
- Lycée de garçons de Bingerville
- Lycée classique d'Abidjan
- Lycée Hôtelier d'Abidjan
- Lycée Mamie Faitai de Bingerville
- Lycée moderne de jeunes filles de Yopougon
- Lycée moderne de Angré
- Lycée moderne Le Mahou
- Lycée technique d'Abidjan
- Lycée municipal d'Adjamé
- Lycée municipal de Marcory
- Lycée municipal Pierre Gadié de Yopougon
- Lycée moderne Yopougon-Andokoi
- Lycée municipal d'Attécoubé
- Lycée technique de Yopougon
- Lycée municipal de Koumassi
- Lycée moderne de Koumassi
- Lycée municipal de Port-Bouët
- Lycée moderne de Port-Bouët
- Lycée moderne d Adjamé 220 logements
- Lycée municipal Simone Ehivet Gbagbo de Niangon (LMSEGN)
- Lycée municipal d'Abobo LyMuA
- Lycée moderne 1 d'Abobo LyMA 1
- Lycée moderne 2 d'Abobo LyMA 2
- Lycée moderne I de Bondoukou
- Lycée moderne II de Bondoukou
- Lycee moderne Adjamé Harris
- Lycée moderne Nangui Abrogoua 1
- Lycée moderne Nangui Abrogoua 2
- Lycée moderne de Treichville
- Lycée Sainte Marie de Cocody

=== Private lycées ===
- Institut LKM de yopougon
- La Farandole Internationale, établissement du réseau de la Mission laïque française
- Lycée Cours Lamartine
- Collège International Jean Mermoz d’Abidjan French school, primary to terminale (end of lycée) - Closed from November 2004-September 2014, now a part of Lycée international Jean-Mermoz
- Lycée Blaise-Pascal d'Abidjan
- Commandant Cousteau (Cocody 2 Plateaux)
- Cours Loko
- Lycée Saint Viateur d'Abidjan
- Lycée Ajavon
- Cours Castaing
- CSM Cocody
- CSM John Wesley
- CSM Plateau
- CSM Yopougon
- Enko John Wesley
- Lycée Offoumou yapo, yopougon
- Lycée La Colombe
- Institut Voltaire Marcory
- Groupe scolaire Thanon Namanko
- Lycée Sainte-Thérèse de Koumassi
- Collège (Lycée) Saint-Jean Bosco de Treichville
- Collège Saint Viateur d'Abidjan
- Institut scolaire Lavoisier
- Institut Froebel
- Cours secondaire catholique de Yopougon (moyen séminaire)
- Institut Libanais d'Enseignement (I.L.E.)
- Groupe Scolaire Les LAUREADESab et BT
- Groupe marie auzey/ENICA ecole nouvelle ivoirienne cocody angre (bac g1, g2, ...)

== Tertiary education ==
=== Public tertiary institutions ===
- Ecole Supérieure Africaine des Technologies de l'Information et de la Communication
- Centre d'animation et de formation pédagogique de Yamoussoukro
- École supérieure des professions immobilières
- Centre ivoirien de recherche et d'études juridiques
- Centre universitaire professionnalisé d'Abidjan
- École nationale d'administration (Côte d'Ivoire)
- École nationale supérieure de statistique et d'économie appliquée (Côte d'Ivoire)
- École normale supérieure (Côte d'Ivoire)
- Institut national polytechnique Félix Houphouët-Boigny
- Université Nangui Abrogoua (Abobo Adjamé)
- Université Alassane Ouattara (Bouaké)
- Université Félix Houphouët-Boigny (Cocody)
- Université Péléforo-Gbon-Coulibaly (Korhogo)

=== Private tertiary institutions ===
- École Supérieure d’interprétariat et de Traduction (ESIT)
- Institut LKM de yopougon
- ALT Formation- Académie Libre de Technologies
- Académie régionale des sciences et techniques de la mer
- Académie universitaire internationale des sciences sociales (AUNIS)
- Agitel-Formation
- Centre international de formation à distance
- École des métiers de la communication (EFAP)
- École nouvelle supérieure d’ingénieurs et de technologies
- École pratique de la chambre de commerce et d'industrie de Côte d'Ivoire
- École supérieure de commerce Castaing
- École supérieure des hautes études technologiques et commerciales (Côte d'Ivoire)
- ESPI Côte d'Ivoire (École supérieure des professions immobilières située à Cocody les II Plateaux)
- Faculté universitaire privée d'Abidjan (FUPA)
- Gecos Formation
- HEC Paris, Abidjan
- Institut Offoumou d'enseignement supérieur (IESTO) à Yopougon
- Institut de Communication de Gestion et d'Etudes Scientifiques (ICOGES Abidjan et Plateau) à la Riviera 9 kilo et Plateau
- Institut Voltaire de l'Enseignement Supérieur Technique et Professionnel (IVESTP) à Marcory
- Groupe CSI Pôle Polytechnique (Riviera Bonoumin)
- Groupe Écoles d'Ingénieurs HETEC
- Groupe École Entreprise Emploi (Groupe 3E) (Plateau Immeuble GYAM second floor)
- Groupe ESCGE du Plateau
- Groupe Sup'Management Réseau Universitaire Intercontinental Libre (Deux Plateaux Les Vallons)
- Groupe E.T.S-EDUFOR
- Université Nord-Sud
- Institut national supérieur des arts et de l'action culturelle
- Institut supérieur des carrières juridiques et judiciaires (Riviera 2 Cocody)
- INSTEC (école de commerce)
- Institut supérieur de technologie de Côte d'Ivoire (IST-CI)
- Institut universitaire d'Abidjan (IUA)
- IPAG
- Université canadienne des arts, des sciences et du management (Côte d'Ivoire)
- Université catholique de l'Afrique de l'Ouest
- Université des sciences et technologies de Côte d'Ivoire (UST-CI)
- Université française d'Abidjan
- Université internationale de Grand-Bassam
- Université internationale des sciences sociales Hampate-Ba
- Université Adama Sanogo d'Abidjan
- Université tertiaire et technologique LOKO (UTT LOKO)
- Université de l'atlantique
- École Spéciale du Bâtiment et des Travaux Publics (ESBTP)
- Université Internationale Privée d'Abidjan (UIPA)
- Institut Supérieur d'Ingénierie et de Santé (ISIS- Abidjan Cocody-II Plateaux)
- Institut Supérieur de Technologie Dubass (IST-DUBASS, Riviera-Faya, Abidjan)
