= Abidjan Metro =

Rapid transit system under construction in Abidjan, Ivory Coast

Métro d'Abidjan
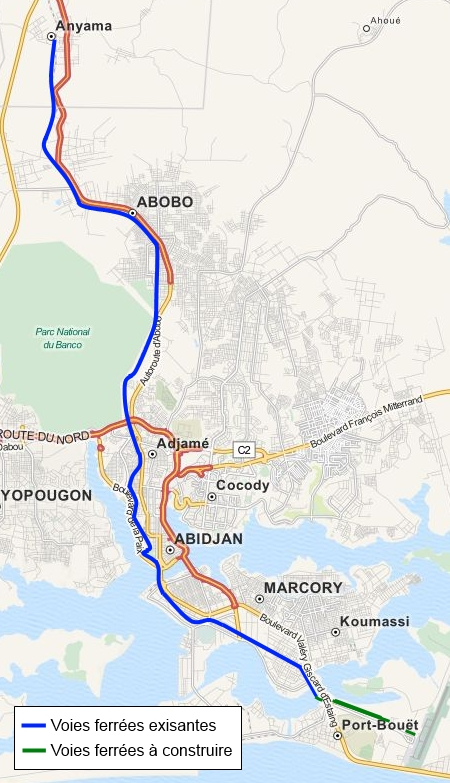

Overview
- Native name: Métro d'Abidjan
- Locale: Abidjan
- Transit type: Rapid transit
- Number of lines: 1
- Number of stations: 20

Operation
- Operation will start: 2028; 2 years' time

Technical
- System length: 37.5 km (23 mi 24 ch)
- Track gauge: 1,435 mm (4 ft 8 1/2 in) standard gauge
- Electrification: Yes

The Abidjan Metro (French: Métro d'Abidjan) is a 37.5-kilometre (23.3 mi) rapid transit network under construction serving the Ivorian economic capital of Abidjan. Construction of the network started in November 2017, with the beginning of passenger service originally expected in 2022–2023, but has since been delayed due to the COVID-19 pandemic to at least 2028. Initially planned to comprise a single line with 13 stations undertaken by Bouygues-Dongsan, a French-Korean consortium, the project has since then been expanded to a single north–south line with 20 stations with 18 stations in service at opening and 2 more in the future, financed 100% by France and built solely by three French groups (Bouygues, through its subsidiaries Bouygues Travaux Publics and Colas Rail, Alstom, and Keolis) after the withdrawal of the South Korean partners from the consortium in October 2017.

Built mostly as an overground and elevated railway in order to avoid more costly tunnels, its automated trains with a driver present in the cabin will be able to run at a top speed of 80 km/h (50 miles/hour) and a maximum frequency of about every 2 minutes. Line 1 of the Abidjan metro is expected to transport 500,000 passengers per day (180 million per year). Construction of line 1 will cost 920 billion CFA francs (1.4 billion euros; 1.7 billion US dollars), entirely financed by France via the French Treasury and the French Development Agency.

In 2018 the Ivorian government was planning for a second line of the Abidjan Metro, an east–west line which would run from Yopougon to Bingerville.

In February 2025, the Minister of Transport Amadou Koné held an information meeting, claiming the construction is continuing steadily. Of the 4,431 buildings to be demolished for land clearing, 4,417 have been demolished. As of February 19, 2025, studies on the project suggest that it is 18% complete.

== Stations ==
=== Line 1 ===
- Anyama Centre (Anyama is a northern suburb of Abidjan)
- Anyama Sud
- Abobo Nord
- Abobo Intermédiaire
- Abobo Centre
- Abobo Banco
- Abobo Université
- Gare Internationale
- Adjamé Agban
- Adjamé Délégation
- Plateau Centre (the central business district of Abidjan)
- Plateau Lagune
- Treichville
- Treichville Hôpital
- Marcory Canal
- Marcory Centre
- VGE (boulevard named after French president Valéry Giscard d'Estaing)
- Akwaba
- Port-Bouët (a southern suburb of Abidjan)
- Aérocité (at Félix Houphouët-Boigny International Airport)

== Rolling stock ==
=== Alstom Metropolis ===
The Ivorian government has awarded French rolling stock manufacturer Alstom the contract to supply 20 five-car Metropolis trains equipped with CBTC.

== See also ==
- Rail transport in Ivory Coast
