= Jacqueline Oble =

Ivorian lawyer and politician

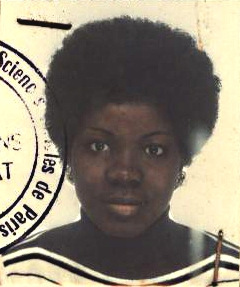
- Born: Anne Jacqueline Lohoues; 1950 (age 74–75)
- Occupations: Lawyer; Politician

Anne Jacqueline Oble (born 1950), also known as Jacqueline Lohoues-Oble, is an Ivorian lawyer and politician who was the first woman to stand as a candidate in a presidential election.

== Early life and education ==
Anne Jacqueline Lohoues was born in Dabou in 1950, one of eleven children. She has a bachelor's degree in law from the University of Abidjan-Cocody (1975), a master's degree in Private Law from the University of Paris II (1977) and a PhD from Jean Moulin University (1982).

== Career ==
Oble is a lawyer and was the first law professor in sub-Saharan Africa at Abidjan Law School and served as dean of law faculty from 1986 to 1989. In 1984, she met Gabonese President Omar Bongo at a conference on family law in Africa, who then introduced her to President Félix Houphouët-Boigny. In 1990, Houphouët-Boigny appointed her Minister of Justice and Keeper of the Seals under Prime Minister Alassane Ouattara.

After Houphouët-Boigny's death in 1993, Oble was one of the founding members of the Rally of the Republicans with her brother Vincent Lohoues Essoh, who later became Minister of Construction and Town Planning under the transitional government of Robert Guéï.

In 1995, Oble was elected as a member of the National Assembly for Abobo. She resigned in 1999 after opposing Ouattara's candidacy for the 2000 presidential election. She returned to the university and then practiced as a legal advisor to Prime Minister Charles Konan Banny from 2006 to 2007.

Oble served as president of African Women Ministers and Parliamentarians and a founding member of the Women Lawyers' Association. After the election of Ellen Johnson Sirleaf in neighbouring Liberia in 2005, many women encouraged her to run for the presidency. In 2010, she was a candidate in the presidential elections, the first woman to contest the position. Although she beat six of the other 13 candidates, she only received 0.27 percent of the vote. She chose to support Laurent Gbagbo in the second round of voting. After his election, she was appointed as his spokesperson, and then from 5 December 2010 to 11 April 2011, she served as Minister of Education in the Gilbert Aké government, which was not recognised by the international community. On 18 December 2010, she spoke on behalf of Gbagbo and called for the immediate withdrawal of UN and French troops from the country, saying the UN was guilty of "serious missteps" and "contempt" for the country's institutions. On 11 January 2011, the European Union placed Oble under sanctions as a member of the Ake N'Gbo government. After Gbagbo's arrest on 11 April 2011, bringing an end to the Second Ivorian Civil War, she was the only minister not disturbed by the new leaders.

Oble returned to her work as an academic at Université Félix Houphouët-Boigny in Cocody and ruled out running in the 2015 presidential election. In 2013, she was serving as member of the Scientific Council of the International Union of Judicial Officers.

== Publications ==
- Lohoues-Oble, Jacqueline (1999). "L'apparition d'un droit international des affaires en Afrique". Revue internationale de droit comparé. 51 (3): 543–591. doi:10.3406/ridc.1999.18250.
- Oblé-Lohoues, Jacqueline (1984). Le droit des successions en Côte d'Ivoire: tradition et modernisme. Nouvelles Editions africaines.
- Assi-Esso, Anne-Marie; Issa-Sayegh, Joseph; Lohoues-Oble, Jacqueline (2002). Droit des assurances. Bruylant. ISBN 9782802716181.
- Issa-Sayegh, Joseph; Lohoues-Oble, Jacqueline (2002). Ohada - Harmonisation du droit des affaires. Bruylant. ISBN 9782802715702.
- Lohoues-Oble, Jacqueline (2008). "Autonomy Of The Parties : The Supplemental Character Of The Provisions Of The Ohada Preliminary Draft Uniform Act On Contract Law". Unif Law Rev. 13 (1–2): 337–338. doi:10.1093/ulr/13.1-2.337.
- Lohoues-Oble, Jacqueline (2009). "Le Traite Ohada Et L'Acte Uniforme Relatif Aux Procedures Simplifiees De Recouvrement Et Des Voies D'Execution: Esquisse D'Un Droit International De L'Execution". Romanian Journal of Compulsory Execution. 148.

== Awards and honours ==
- Knight in the Ordre des Palmes Académiques of France
- Commander in the Order of National Education of the Republic of Côte d'Ivoire
- Officer in the National Order of the Ivory Coast

== Personal life ==
Oble is widowed and has four daughters and two granddaughters.
