= Treich =

Treich is name of:

- Marcel Treich-Laplène (1860–1890), first explorer of Côte d'Ivoire and its first colonial administrator
- Léon Treich (1889–1973)

Place name

- Treichville, name comes from Marcel Treich-Laplène
