= Rail transport in Ivory Coast =

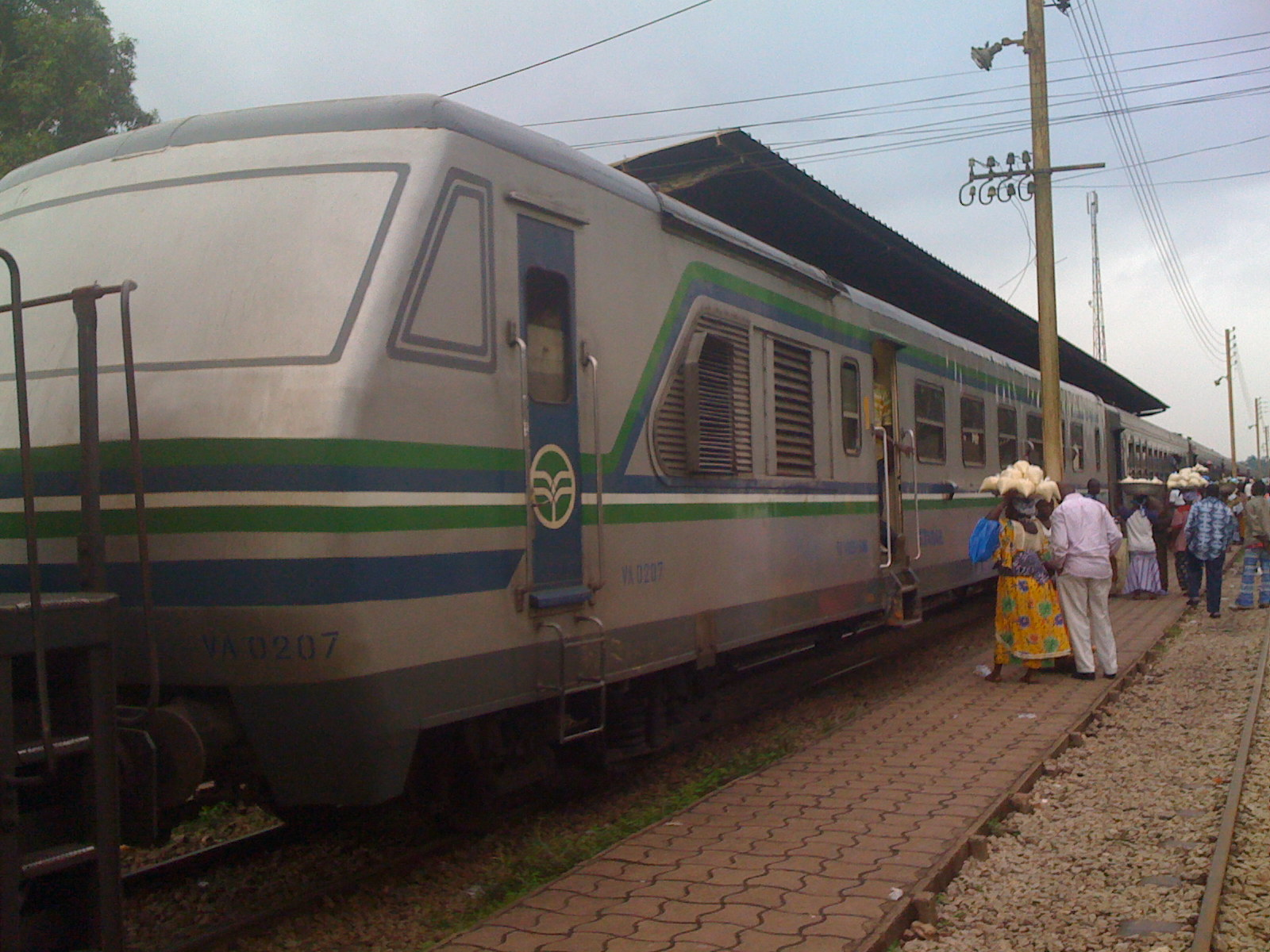
A Sitarail train in July 2009

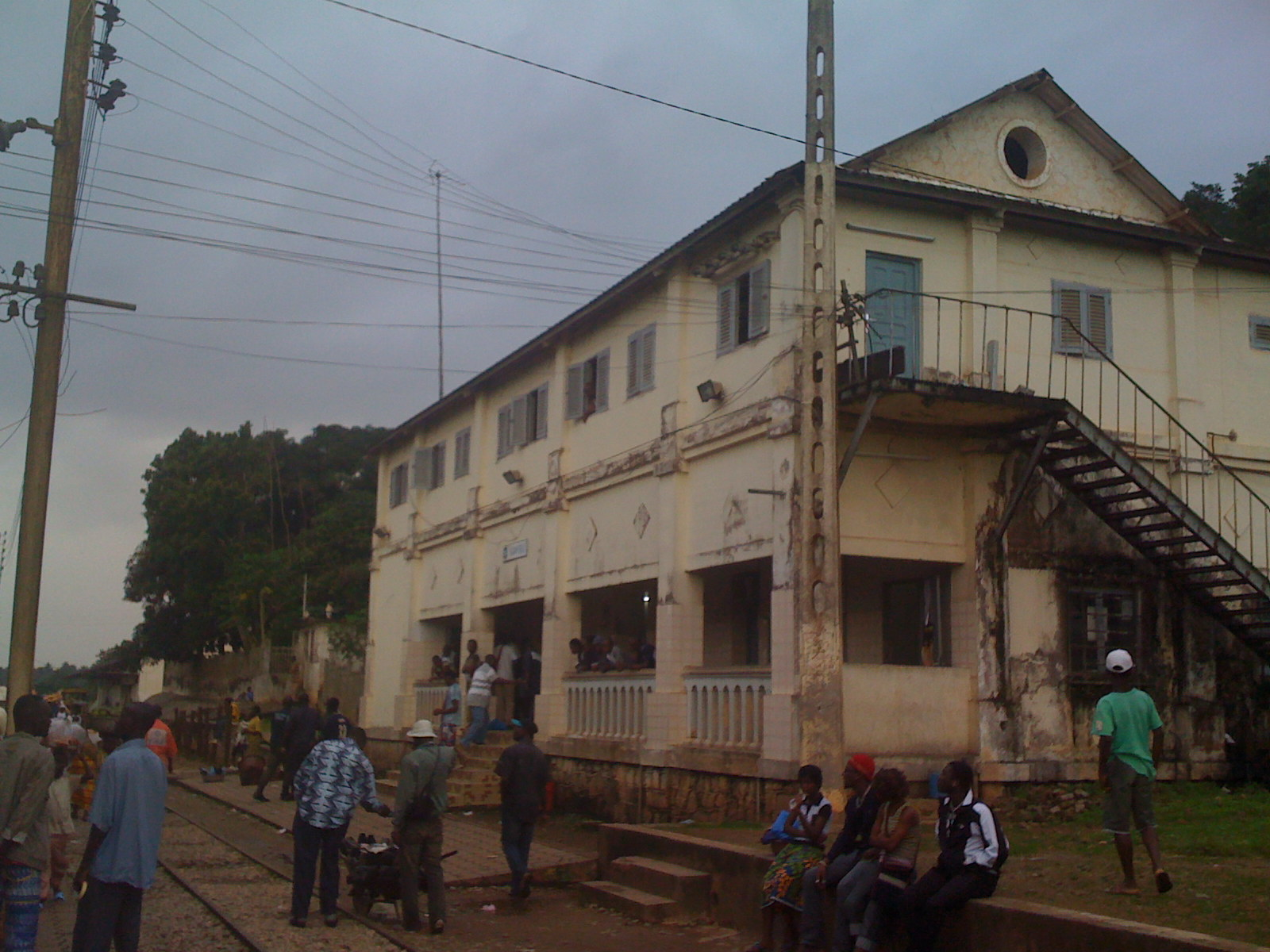
Agboville station in July 2009

Ivory Coast (Côte d'Ivoire) has 660 kilometres (410 mi) of railway (1995 estimate). The track gauge is 1,000 mm (3 ft 3 3/8 in).

The main railway in the country is the Abidjan–Ouagadougou railway. The railway was built during the French colonial period, and links the port city of Abidjan with Ouagadougou, the capital of Burkina Faso.

Ivory Coast also has a metro system under construction, known as the Abidjan Metro. It will be 37 km long and connect Abidjan with Port-Bouët and Anyama.

== Railway links with adjacent countries ==
Burkina Faso - yes - 1,000 mm (3 ft 3 3/8 in)

In 2025 being converted to standard gauge (1435mm) as part of regauged Mali-Burkina Faso-Niger Line "Sahel Railway"
In 2025 Bamako - Break of Gauge

Ghana - no - break of gauge 1,000 mm (3 ft 3 3/8 in)/1,067 mm (3 ft 6 in)

in 2025 being converted to standard gauge (1435mm)

Mali - no - same gauge
Guinea - no - same gauge
Liberia - Standard gauge (1435mm)

== Timeline ==
=== 2010 ===
- In October 2010, the government announced plans to build a 737 km line which would link the port of San Pedro to mines in the west of the country.

=== 2015 ===
- The first two of six GT26 locomotives arrived from NRE in June 2015.

=== 2016 ===
- Six locomotives were ordered from Grindrod.

=== 2019 ===
- Three BDe 4/4 II electric railcars, three ABt driving cars and nine second class coaches, formerly in service for Appenzeller Bahnen in Switzerland, were bought by Société de Transport Ivoiro-Burkinabe. They are to be used on services between Abidjan in Côte d'Ivoire and Ouagadougou in Burkina Faso.
- A bilateral agreement between Côte d'Ivoire and Burkina Faso for the modernisation and extension of the railway line connecting Abidjan, Ouagadougou, and Kaya was signed in July 2019.
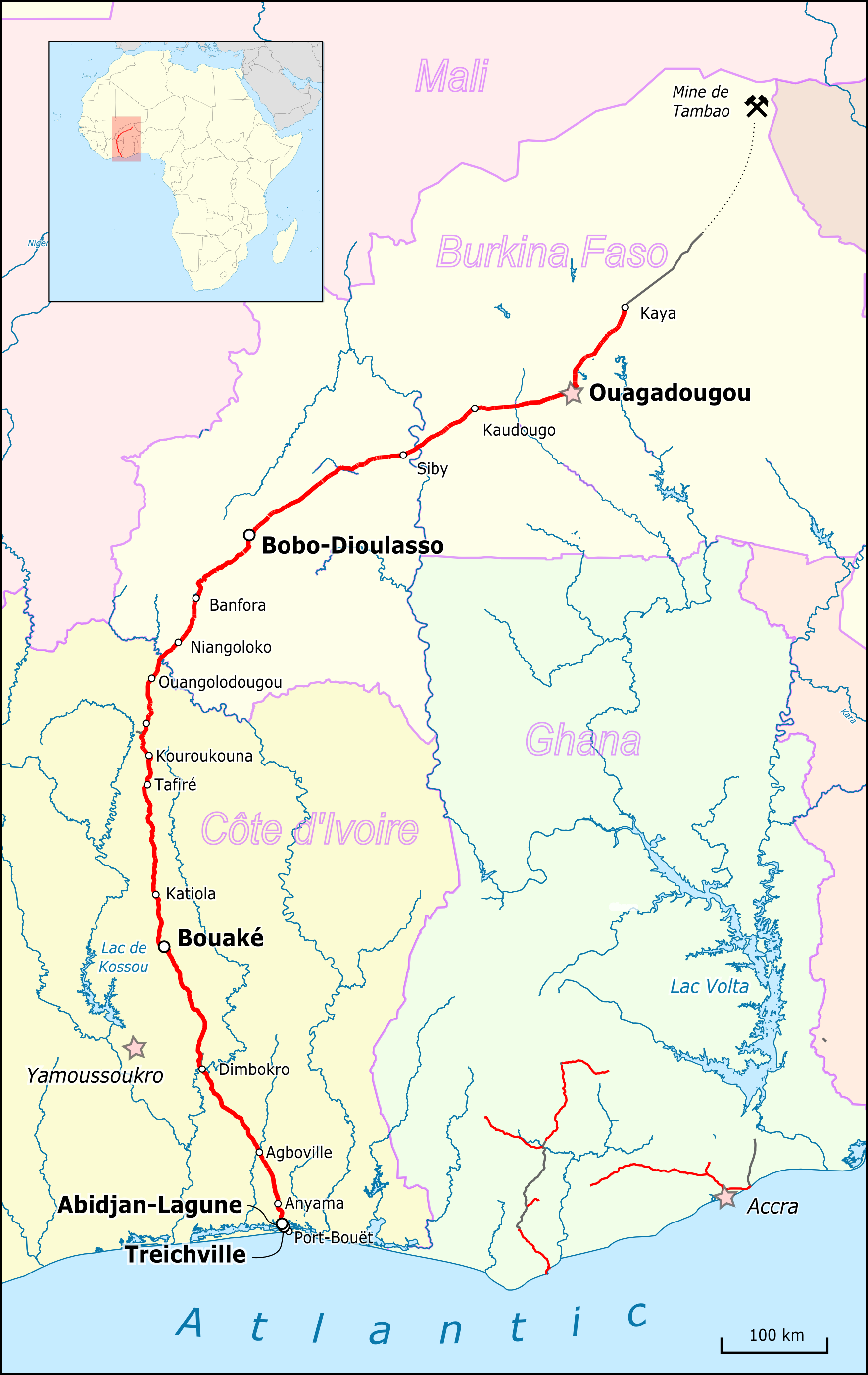
Abidjan-Ouagadougou railway map

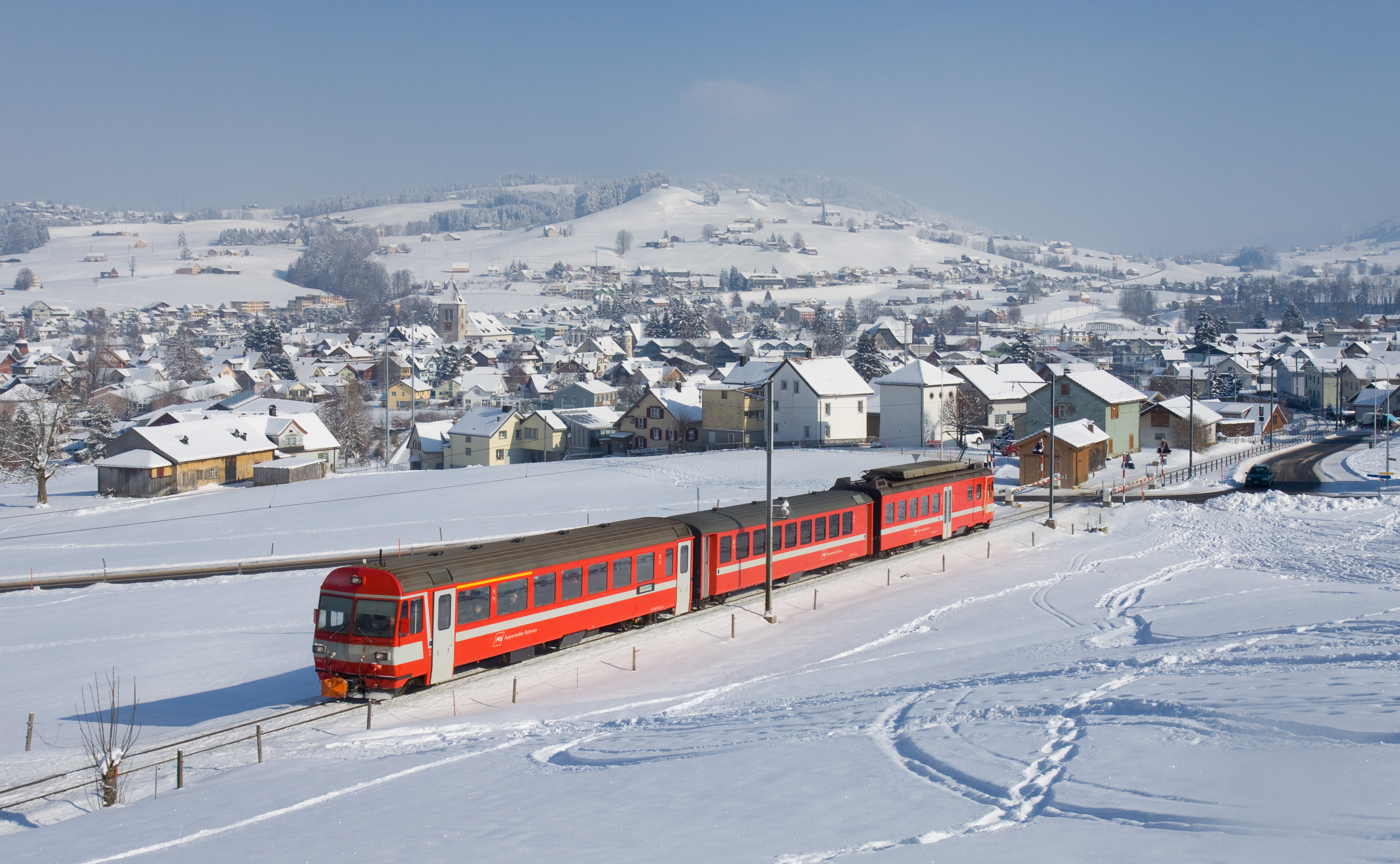
ABt and BDe 4/4 II in Switzerland

=== 2025 ===
The 1435mm gauge Sahel Railway started in April 2025 connects Mali via Ouagadougou in Burkina Faso to Niamey in Niger.

== Gallery ==
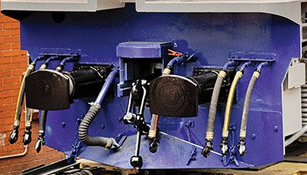
Buffer-and-screw coupler 1,000 mm (3 ft 3 3/8 in) metre gauge gauge in Ivory Coast and Burkina Faso.

== See also ==
- Railway stations in Ivory Coast
- Transport in Ivory Coast
