= Zone 4 =

Zone 4 may refer to:

- Hardiness zone, a geographically defined zone in which a specific category of plant life is capable of growing
- Marcory Zone 4, one of the four zones of Marcory, Abidjan, Ivory Coast
- London fare zone 4, of the Transport for London zonal system
- Zone 4, in the Great Britain road numbering scheme
- Zone 4 (record label), a record label created by producer Polow da Don
- Zone 4 of Milan
