= Wadja Egnankou =

- Occupation: Scientist
- Employer: University of Abidjan
- Known for: Efforts on protection of mangrove forests
- Awards: Goldman Environmental Prize (1992)

Wadja Egnankou is a scientist from Côte d'Ivoire, a researcher at the University of Abidjan. He is a botanist, wetland expert and lecturer at the University of Abidjan, Cote d’Ivoire. He is also the founder and president of the NGO SOS-FORETS. He received the Goldman Environmental Prize in 1992 for his efforts to protect the mangrove forests of the country.

== Works ==
In 1996, Egnankou and his associates at the National University initiated S.O.S. Forêts (S.O.S. Forests), a non-profit oriented organization committed to safeguarding all forests and their resources.

Holding the position of the executive president, Egnankou aims to raise the Ivorian people's consciousness about their rights and obligations in relation to forests. He also leads a regional coalition focused on the mangroves of the Gulf of Guinea. Apart from his teaching and research duties at the University of Abidjan, Egnankou has executed a three-year plan backed by the Global Environmental Facility to control the spread of exotic aquatic vegetation.

== Award ==
1992 Goldman Prize winner
