= Jean-Mermoz International School =

- Lycée international Jean-Mermoz
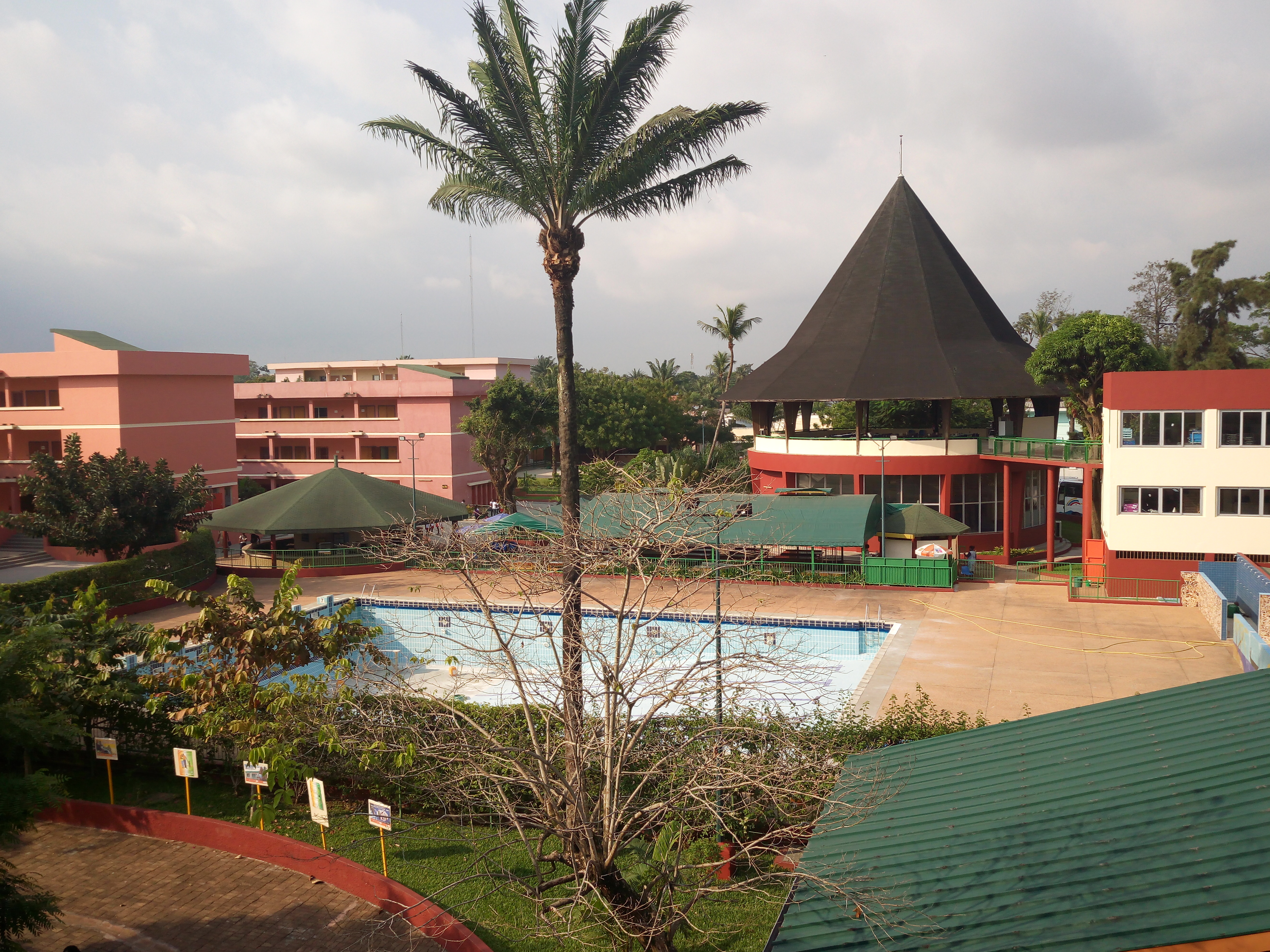

Location
- Coordinates: 5.3401°N 3.9984°W

Information
- Website: lijmermoz.org

Jean-Mermoz International School (French: Lycée international Jean-Mermoz) is a French international school in Cocody, Abidjan, Ivory Coast. It serves maternelle (preschool) through lycée (senior high school).

The school was established on the site of the former Collège international Jean-Mermoz, which opened in 1961 and closed in November 2004. The new school reopened in 2014 with the French name lycée to show that high school is a part of the institution.

== See also ==
- Lycée Français Blaise Pascal Abidjan
- List of schools in Abidjan
