= Tanella Boni =

Ivorian poet and novelist (1954–2026)

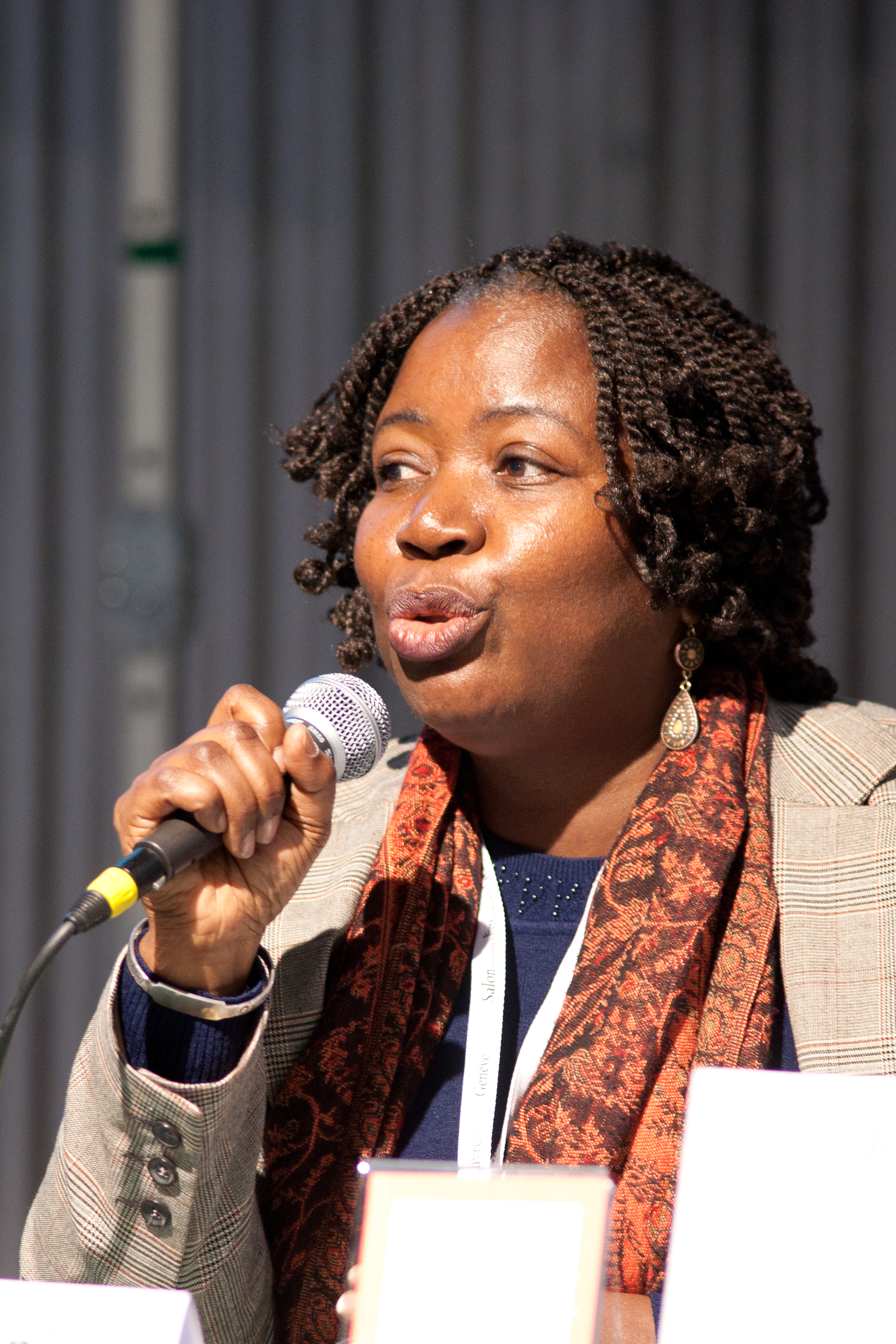
- Boni at book fair in Geneva, 2012
- Born: Tanella Suzanne Boni; 1954; Abidjan, Ivory Coast, French West Africa
- Died: September 15, 2026 (aged 71–72); Toulouse, France
- Education: University of Paris (PhD)
- Occupations: Poet, novelist and academic
- Employer: University of Cocody-Abidjan (now University of Félix Houphouët-Boigny)
- Website: aflit.arts.uwa.edu.au/BoniTanellaEng.html

Tanella Suzanne Boni (1954 – 15 September 2026) was an Ivorian poet and novelist. Also an academic, she was Professor of Philosophy at the University of Abidjan. Apart from her teaching and research activities, she was the President of the association of writers of the Ivory Coast from 1991 to 1997, and later the organizer of the International Poetry Festival in Abidjan from 1998 to 2002.

== Life and career ==
Tanella Boni was born in Abidjan, Ivory Coast, where she was educated to high-school level, before going on to further university studies in Toulouse, France, and at the University of Paris, obtaining a PhD. She subsequently became Professor of Philosophy at the University of Cocody-Abidjan (now the University of Félix Houphouët-Boigny), as well as writing poetry, novels, short stories, criticism, and children's literature.

Boni served as President of the Writers' Association of Ivory Coast from 1991 to 1997 and organized Abidjan's International Poetry Festival from 1998 to 2002. During the political strife in Ivory Coast (from 2002 until 2011), she self-exiled to France.

In 2005, she received the Ahmadou Kourouma Prize for her novel Matins de couvre-feu (Mornings after curfew). In 2009, she won the Antonio Viccaro International Poetry Prize. From 2013, Boni divided her time between Abidjan and Paris.

Boni was a contributor to the 2019 anthology New Daughters of Africa, edited by Margaret Busby.

Boni died in Toulouse, France, on 15 September 2026.

== Bibliography ==
- Labyrinthe (poems), Lomé: Editions Akpagnon, 1984
- Une vie de crabe (novel), Dakar: Nouvelles Editions Africaines du Sénégal, 1990
- De l'autre côté du soleil (children's story), Paris: NEA-EDICEF, 1991
- La fugue d'Ozone (children's story), Paris: NEA-EDICEF, 1992
- Grains de sable (poems), Limoges: Le bruit des autres, 1993
- Les baigneurs du Lac rose (novel), Abidjan: Nouvelles Editions Ivoiriennes, 1995; Paris: Editions du Serpent à Plumes, 2002
- Il n'y a pas de parole heureuse (poems), Limoges: Le bruit des autres, 1997
- L'atelier des génies (children's story), Paris: Acoria, 2001
- Chaque jour l'espérance (poems), Paris: L'Harmattan, 2002
- Ma peau est fenêtre d'avenir (poems), La Rochelle: Rumeur des Ages, 2004
- Gorée île baobab (poems), Limoges & Ecrits des forges, Trois-Rivières (Québec), 2004
- Matins de couvre-feu (novel), Paris: Editions du Serpent à plumes, 2005
- Que vivent les femmes d'Afrique (essay), Paris: Editions Panama, 2008, ISBN 978-2755701425
- Les nègres n’iront jamais au paradis (novel), Paris: Editions du Serpent à Plumes, 2006
- Le Rêve du dromadaire (poems, illustrated by Muriel Diallo), Cotonou: Ruisseaux d’Afrique, 2009
- Myriam Makeba: une voix pour la liberté (biography), Paris: Éditions À dos d'âne, 2009
- Jusqu’au souvenir de ton visage (poems), Paris: Alfabarre, 2010
- L’avenir a rendez-vous avec l'aube (poems), Vents d’ailleurs, Festival de La Roque-d'Anthéron, 2011, ISBN 978-2911412929. Translated into English by Todd Fredson as The Future Has an Appointment with the Dawn, with an Introduction by Honorée Fanonne Jeffers, University of Nebraska Press, 2018, ISBN 978-1496211859
- Toute d’étincelles vêtue (poems), La Roque-d’Anthéron: Vents d’ailleurs, 2014
- Là où il fait si clair en moi (poems), Paris: Éditions Bruno Doucey, 2017

== Awards ==
- 2005: Ahmadou Kourouma Prize for Matins de couvre-feu
- 2009: Antonio Vicarro International Poetry Prize
