= Students and Pupils Movement of Côte d'Ivoire =

Student organization in Ivory Coast

Students and Pupils Movement of Côte d'Ivoire (in French: Mouvement des Etudiants et Elèves de Côte d'Ivoire), generally called M.E.E.C.I., was an organization of students and pupils in Côte d'Ivoire. M.E.E.C.I. was founded of the initiative of the regime of Félix Houphouët-Boigny. The founding congress was held at the Democratic Party of Côte d'Ivoire office in Abidjan April 3–5, 1969. Tanoh Brou Antoine (later Minister of Environment) was elected president of the executive committee. Alphonse Djédjé Mady was elected president the standing council. Mambo Yapi was elected president of the accounting commissariat.

The formation of M.E.E.C.I. provoked protests amongst students. A group of students were arrested during a students strike against the formation of M.E.E.C.I..

It was the sole officially recognized student organization in the country between 1969 and its dissolution in 1990.

== See also ==
- Pupils and Students Trade Union of Côte d'Ivoire
