= Grindrod Locomotives =

South African railway locomotives company

Grindrod Locomotives is a South African railway locomotive manufacturer tied to the Grindrod company.

== Leases ==
Headquartered in Pretoria West, a division of the company, Grindrod Rail, owns and leases out over 60 locomotives to various railways.

== Timeline ==
=== 2016 ===
- Six locomotives ordered by Sitarail, for Ivory Coast and Burkina Faso.
- The order is for 16 locomotives of two types :
  - Shunter
  - Mainline #CC33201-CC33210.

== Types ==
Class	Engine	Power HP	TE kN	Wheels	Gauge(s)	Axle load t	Fuel L	Max km/h	X	Country	Fleet	Misc	Remarks
GS7S3C-DC	1 x Genset; Caterpillar C18	0700	200	Co	1000mm	20	0800	050	D	Ivory Coast	aa	shunting and short-haul	
GL30SCM-DC	CC	aa	bb	Co-Co	1000mm		7000	100	ee	Cameroon	4	YY	
GB14DBC-AC; GB14DBM-AC	2 x Caterpillar C18	1400	300	Bo-Bo	1067mm 1000mm	18	4000	090	D	Ivory Coast	CC33201-CC33210	shunting, short-haul, passenger and light-load long-haul.	Dual Cab
GL30SCC-AC	E3B 16-645; 1x3000 or 1x3300	3000 or 3300	500	Co-Co	1067mm	20	6500	100	_	Africa	gg	main-line	
GL36SCC-DC		3600	450	Co-Co	1067mm	21	8000	090	_		ii	main-line	
GS7S3C-AC	1 x Genset	0700	250	Co	1067mm	20	0800	050	A		kk	shunting and short-haul	
GL22SCC-DC	1 x 7FDL12 (General Electric)	2200	300	Co-Co	1067mm	15	4000	090	_		mm	main-line	
GL30SCC-DC	nn	3000	300	Co-Co	1067mm	18	TTaa	100	uu	vv	pp	heavy freight	
GB14	2 x Genset or Caterpillar C18 or MTU or Cummins	1400	FF	Bo-Bo	LL	18	NNNN	090	pp	Mozambique; Tanzania; Cameroon; Kenya; Nigeria	rr	passenger	Dual cab.
GPR30				Co-Co	CC	21	7000	zz	W	Cameroon _	07+	UU	yy

=== Notes ===
- Note: -DC = Direct Current traction motors.
- Note: -AC = Alternating Current traction motors.
- Note: C- = Cape Gauge (1067mm)
- Note: M- = Metre Gauge (1000mm)
- Note: X= Coupler types are:
- * A = Alliance (American)
- * D = Dual Buffers (British)
- * C = Chopper (Norwegian)
- * S = Single Buffer (German)
- * W = Willison (Russian)
