= University of Abobo-Adjamé =

Public university in Abidjan, Ivory Coast

Coordinates: 5°23′21″N 4°01′09″W

- Université d'Abobo-Adjamé
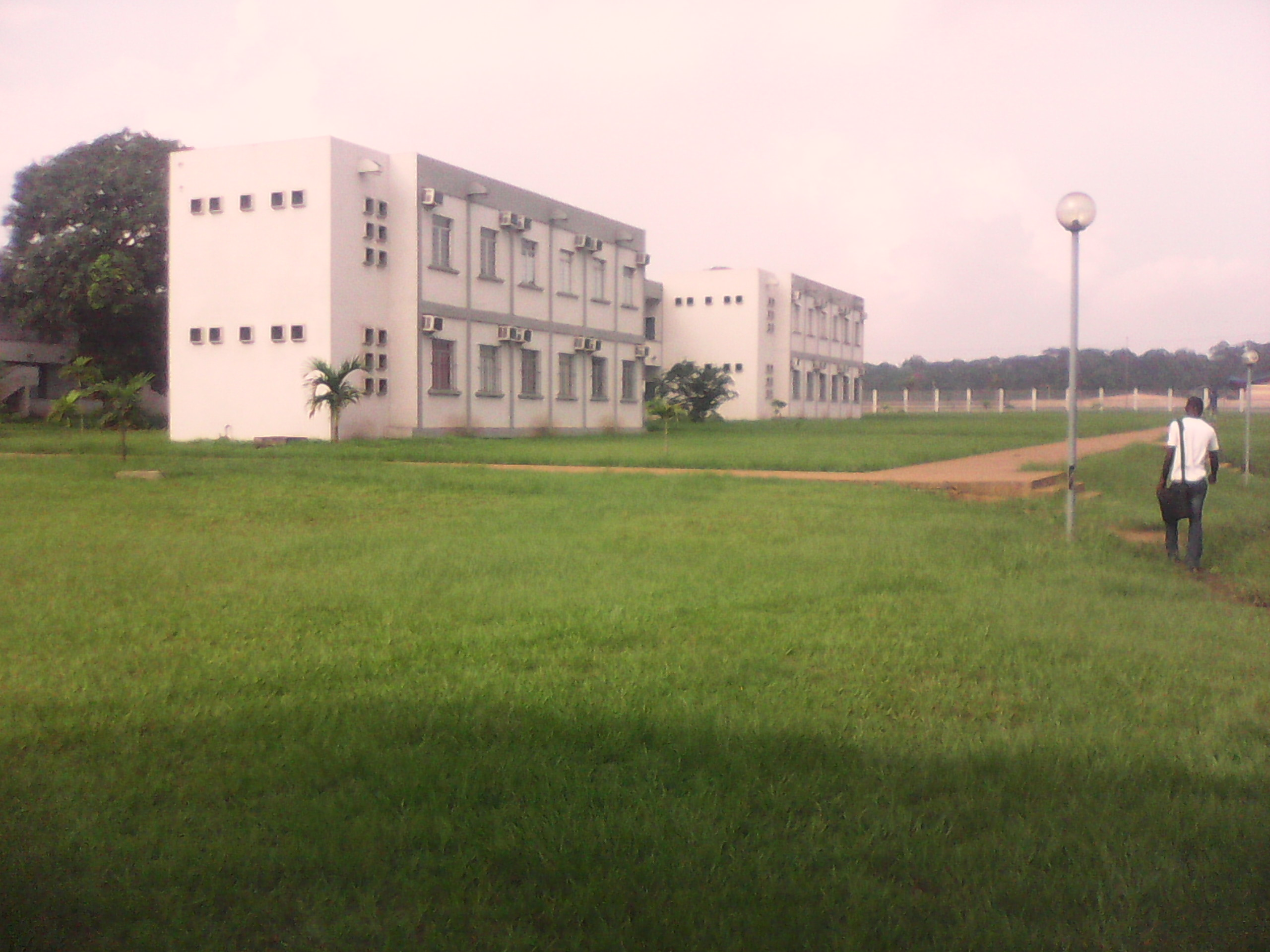
- Type: Public university
- Established: 1996
- President: Germain Gourène
- Students: 6,500 UG (1996)
- Location: Abidjan
- Campus: Abobo, Adjamé
- Language: French
- Website: www.univ-na.edu.ci

Université d'Abobo-Adjamé or the University of Abobo-Adjamé (UAA) is part of the University of Cocody, one of two public universities in Abidjan, the economic capital of Côte d'Ivoire. It is located in the Abobo, Adjamé districts of the city. Founded in 1996, the University has around 8,000 students as of 2011 training in basic sciences (Maths, Science) and experimental sciences (Physics, Chemistry and Biosciences). The University of Abobo-Adjamé also offers training for Health Sciences. The University was mostly destroyed during armed clashes on 13–14 March 2011 and has closed indefinitely.
