= François Amichia =

Ivorian politician

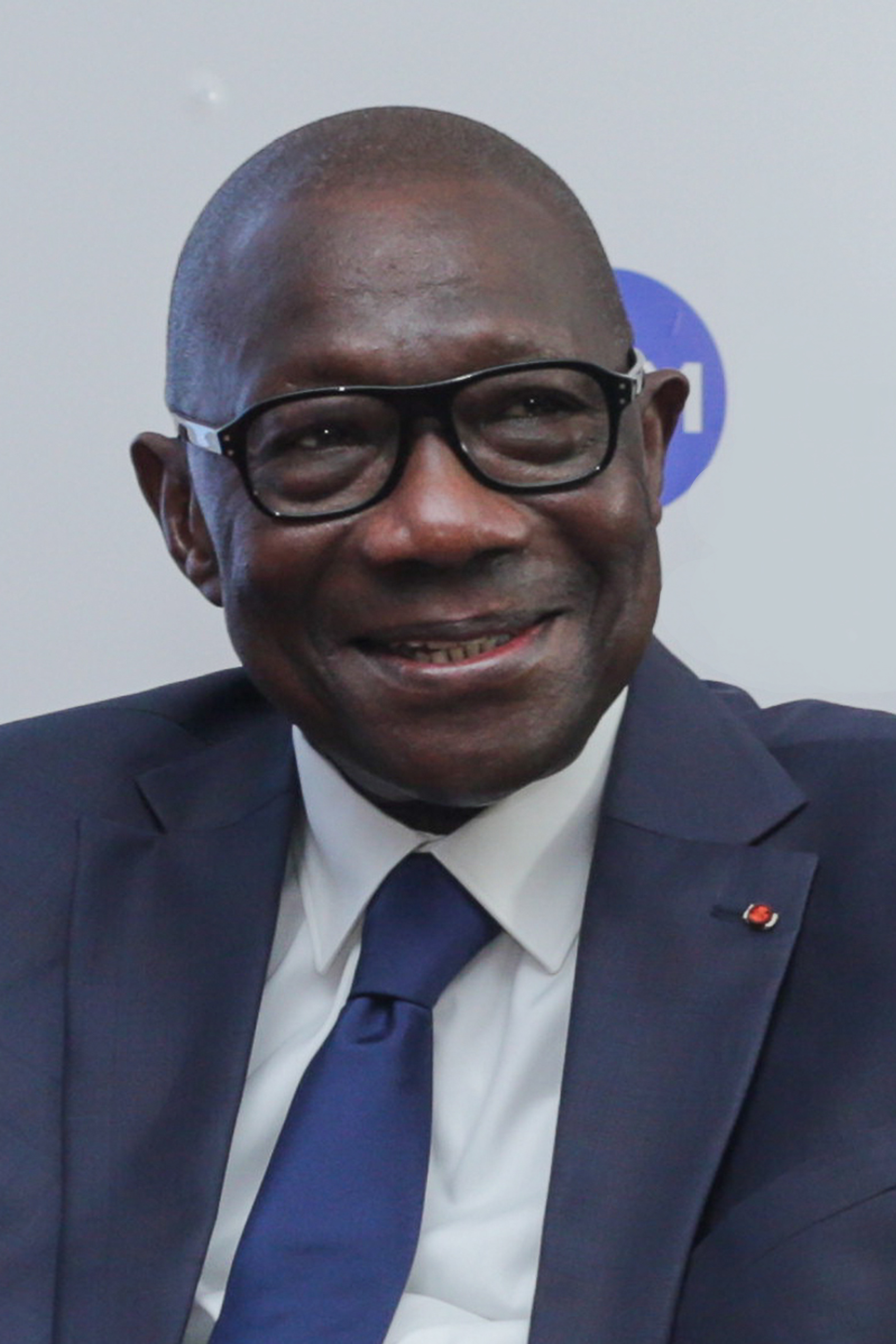
Image of François Amichia

François Albert Amichia (born 4 October 1952 in Abidjan) is an Ivorian politician. He is a member of the Democratic Party of Côte d'Ivoire - African Democratic Rally (PDCI-RDA). He was the mayor of Treichville and held the post of sports minister and the minister of tourism. Since 2018 he is minister for cities and urban development.

In 2002, he was held hostage in Bouaké in the center of the country during a rebellion. He was released a few days later.

He is also the president of the Union of cities and municipalities of Côte d'Ivoire (UVICOCI).

Amichia tested positive for Covid-19 on 10 July 2020.
