= Abidjan Exhibition Centre =

International expo and exhibition centre in Abidjan

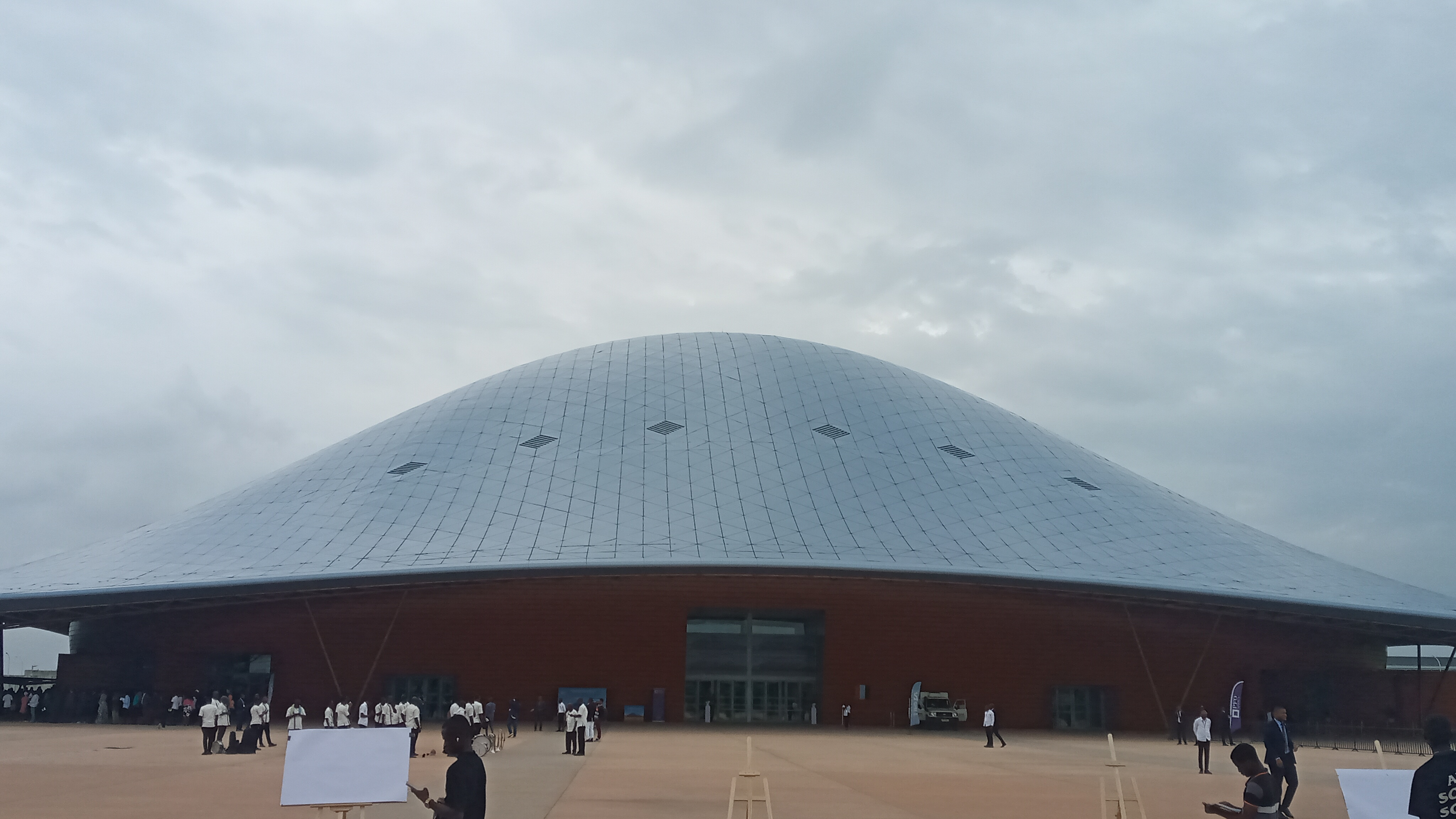
- Interactive map of Abidjan Exhibition Centre
- Address: Boulevard de l'Aéroport, Port-Bouët
- Location: Abidjan, Ivory Coast
- Coordinates: 5.2647°N 3.9459°W
- Owner: Ministry of Commerce

Construction
- Opened: 17 July 2023
- Cost: CFA 75 billion

The Abidjan Exhibition Centre is a convention and exhibition complex intended for trade shows, fairs and to host other significant events in Ivory Coast. It is located in the Port-Bouët commune of Abidjan close to the Félix Houphouët-Boigny International Airport. It includes a large exhibition hall, a 5,000-seat convention center, an administrative building, a semi-covered parking lot with 800 spaces, and various outdoor facilities.

== History ==
It construction began in February 2020, it was opened on 17 July 2023 by Ivorian vice-president Tiémoko Meyliet Koné.

The cost of the exhibition center is estimated at more than 75 billion CFA francs (128 million dollars). The complex was built by the PFO Africa group, founded by Ivorian-Lebanese architect Pierre Fakhoury.

== Description ==
Located in Port-Bouet, a seaside resort in the south of Abidjan, the Abidjan Exhibition Centre is built on a 16-hectare site and is the largest exhibition centre in West Africa and sub-Saharan Africa.

The Convention Center, designed as a large central nave, is about 9,000 square meters under 35 meters of height. The overhanging roof projects a 137-metre square; designed for multi-purpose use. The park's retractable stands accommodates international conferences (up to 5,000 people), trade fairs and other commercial exhibitions.

The large 7,200 square meters exhibition hall has a 15-metre high ceiling which can be divided into two or three smaller halls.
