= Université Félix Houphouët-Boigny =

Public university in Abidjan, Ivory Coast

Coordinates: 5°20′44″N 3°59′10″W

- Former name: University of Abidjan-Cocody (1964-1996)
- Motto: "Scientia et Sapientia Via Mea"
- Type: Public
- Established: 9 January 1964
- President: Prof Ballao Zié
- Students: 50,000
- Location: Abidjan, Côte d'Ivoire
- Campus: 01 BP V34 Abidjan, République de Côte d'Ivoire
- Colours: Green, White
- Website: https://univ-fhb.edu.ci/

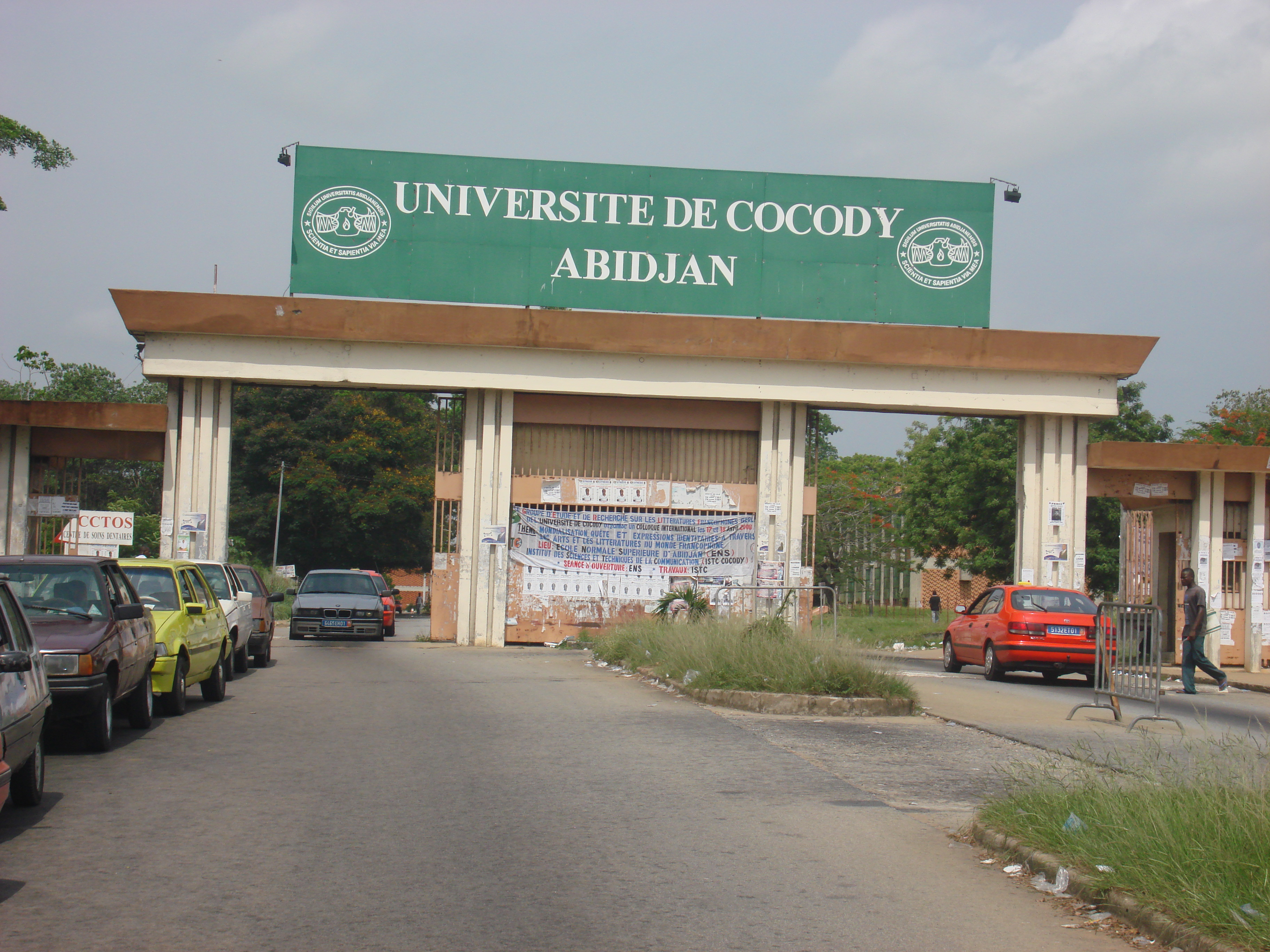
The campus entrance

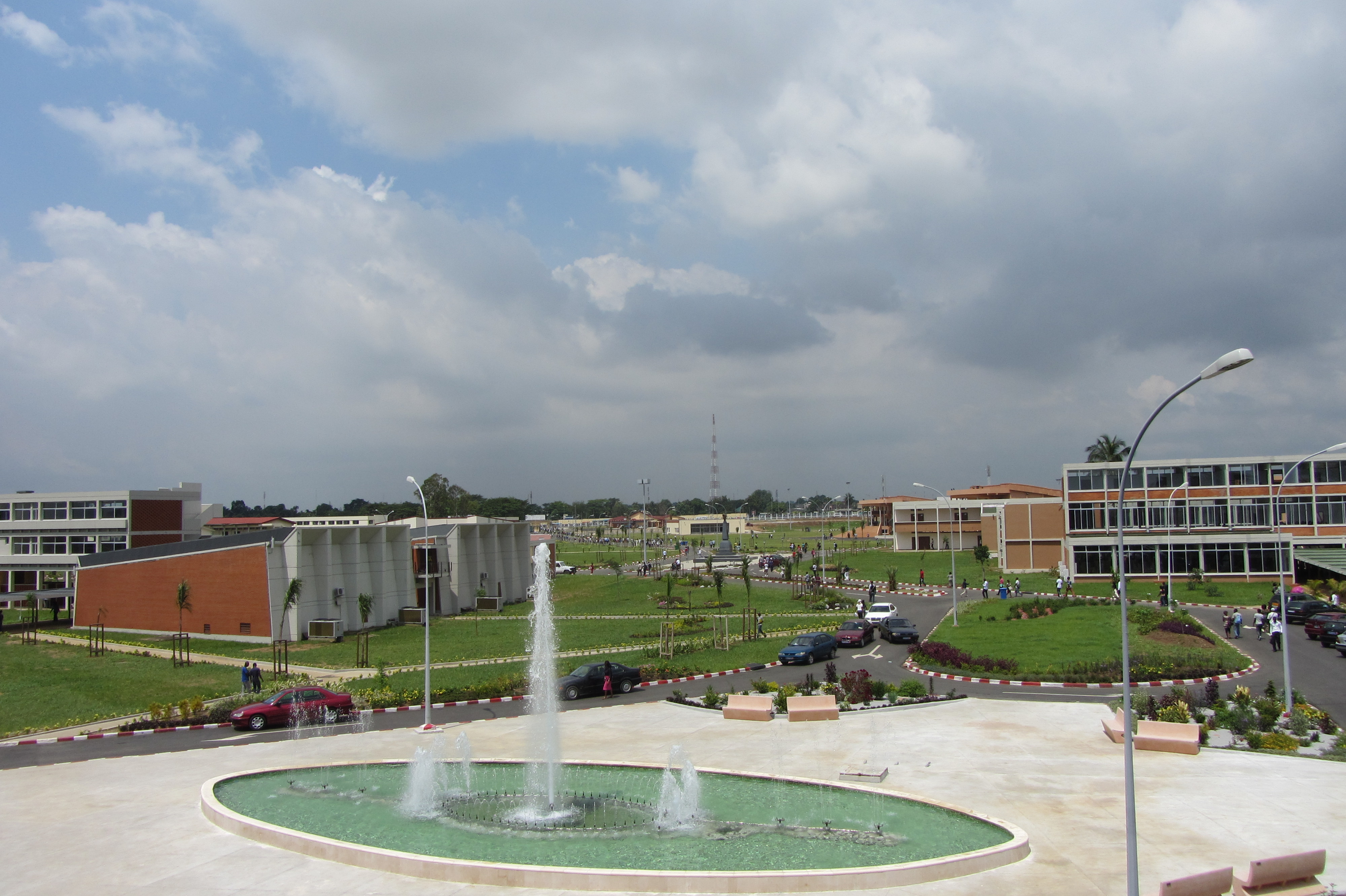
The University campus

Université Félix Houphouët-Boigny (UFHB), formerly known as Université de Cocody or Université de Cocody-Abidjan, is a public university located in the Cocody section of Abidjan and the largest in Côte d'Ivoire. With over 50,000 students, the UFHB has 13 faculties and several research centers providing diplomas from two-year undergraduate to professional academic, medical, legal, and specialist degrees. From 1964 to 1996, it remained the main campus of the national University of Abidjan system. It is state owned and operated by the Ministry of Higher Education and Scientific Research. In 2008, it had 53,700 students. Ballo Zié is the president’s Université de Cocody-Abidjan.

== History ==
UCA was an outgrowth of two French founded institutions from 1958. The Ecole des Lettres d’Abidjan (E.L.A.) founded in October 1958, under the joint administration of the University of Dakar and the Ivorian education directorate ("Direction de l’enseignement de Côte d’Ivoire"). Founded on the same date was the Abidjan Center for Higher Education ("Centre d’enseignement supérieur d’Abidjan").

On 9 January 1964 the government of Côte d'Ivoire fused the institutions and promoted them to the rank of university. The public university system was, until reorganization in 1996, known as the University of Abidjan, with the University of Abidjan-Cocody as the largest of three campuses.

In the reorganization of August 1996, each of the three main campuses became independent universities, accountable directly to the Ivorian Ministry of Education. (The three are the Université d'Abobo-Adjamé, the Université de Bouaké, and the Université de Cocody.) At this time the "Faculties" were re-designated "Unités de formation et de recherche" (UFR) or "Research and Training Units" (RTU). The university consisted of 13 UFRs and one "Center". The number of special research centers and institutes have since expanded. In 2008 there were two Autonomous Research Centers in Social Sciences and Mathematics, as well as ten institutes of advanced study.

In 1971, students at the university founded the Pupils and Students Trade Union of Côte d'Ivoire (Union Syndicale des Elèves et Etudiants de Côte d'Ivoire or USEEECI) in protest of the regime-sponsored Students and Pupils Movement of Côte d'Ivoire (MEECI).

The institution's name was changed to Université Félix Houphouët-Boigny, honoring the former president, in August 2012.

== Faculties ==
=== FLASH ===
In 1971, the School of Letters (formerly the E.L.A.) became the "Faculté des Lettres, Arts et Sciences Humaines" (FLASH). In 1977, the Department of History, for example, moved from offering only undergraduate courses ("Premier cycle") and began to offer "Deuxième cycle" and "Troisième cycle" diplomas (Master's degrees and PhD).

== Autonomous research centers ==
- Centre Ivoirien de Recherche Economique et Social (CIRES), Ivorian center of economics and social sciences
- Institut de Recherches Mathématiques (IRMA), Institute of mathematics

== Institutes and centers ==
- Centre National de Floristique (CNF)
- Centre Universitaire de Recherche d’Application en Télédétection (CURAT)
- Institut de Géographie Tropicale (IGT)
- Institut d’Histoire, d’Arts et d’Archéologie-Africains (IHAAA)
- Institut d’Ethno-Sociologie (IES )
- Centre de Recherche Architecturales et Urbaines (CRAU)
- Centre Ivoirien d’Enseignement et de Recherche en Psychologie Appliquée (CIERPA)
- Institut de Recherche, d’Expérimentation et d’Enseignement en Pédagogie (IREEP)
- Institut de Linguistique Appliquée (ILA)
- Institut des Sciences Anthropologiques du développement (ISAD)

== Notable faculty ==
- Gilbert Aké
- Gladys Anoma
- Séry Bailly
- Tanella Boni
- Wadja Egnankou
- Fatou Fanny-Cissé
- Joséphine Guidy Wandja
- Timpoko Helène Kienon-Kabore
- Yacouba Konaté
- Ramata Ly-Bakayoko
- Jacqueline Oble

== Notable alumni ==
- Mariam Coulibaly
- Yvonne Libona Bonzi Coulibaly
- Rashid Mohamed Mbaraka Fatma

== See also ==
- List of Islamic educational institutions
- Université d'Abobo-Adjamé
