= Joséphine Guidy Wandja =

Ivorian mathematician (born 1945)

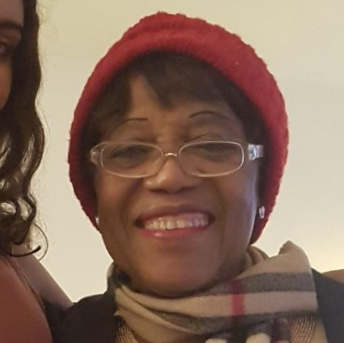
- Born: Joséphine Wandja; 1945 (age 80–81); Ivory Coast
- Other name: Joséphine Guidy-Wandja
- Citizenship: Ivory Coast
- Occupation: Mathematics lecturer

Academic background
- Education: Lycée Jules-Ferry
- Alma mater: Pierre and Marie Curie University; University of Abidjan

Academic work
- Discipline: Mathematics
- Institutions: Paris Diderot University (1970-71); University of Abidjan (1971-?)

Joséphine Guidy Wandja (born 1945, also Guidy-Wandja) is an Ivorian mathematician. She is the first African woman with a PhD in mathematics.

== Early life ==
She moved to France aged 14. She attended the Lycée Jules-Ferry in Paris, and later the Pierre and Marie Curie University. Her master's degree thesis was entitled Sous les courbes fermées convexes du plan et le théorème des quatre sommets (Under closed convex curves in the plane and the theorem of four peaks). Whilst working in Paris in the late 1960s she was advised by René Thom, Henri Cartan and Paulette Liberman. She studied for a PhD at the University of Abidjan, becoming the first African woman to get a PhD in mathematics.

== Career ==
In 1969, she worked at the Lycée Jacques Amyot in Melun, before working for a year at the Paris Diderot University. In 1971, she joined the University of Abidjan. There she became the first African female university mathematics professor. In 1983, she was appointed the president of the International Committee on Mathematics in Developing Countries (ICOMIDC). The organisation was set up during the International Mathematical Union (IMU) conference in Warsaw, Poland, but without the IMU's knowledge. In 1986, she wrote a humorous 24 page mathematical comic book Yao crack en maths. In 1985, she organised an ICOMIDC conference in Yamoussoukro, Ivory Coast.

She is an officer of the Ivorian Order of Merit of National Education, and the French Ordre des Palmes Académiques.

== Publications ==
- Guidy Wandja, Joséphine, Yao crack en maths (in French), Nouvelles Éditions africaines, 1985. ISBN 2723607356
