= Fatou Fanny-Cissé =

Ivorian writer (1971–2018)

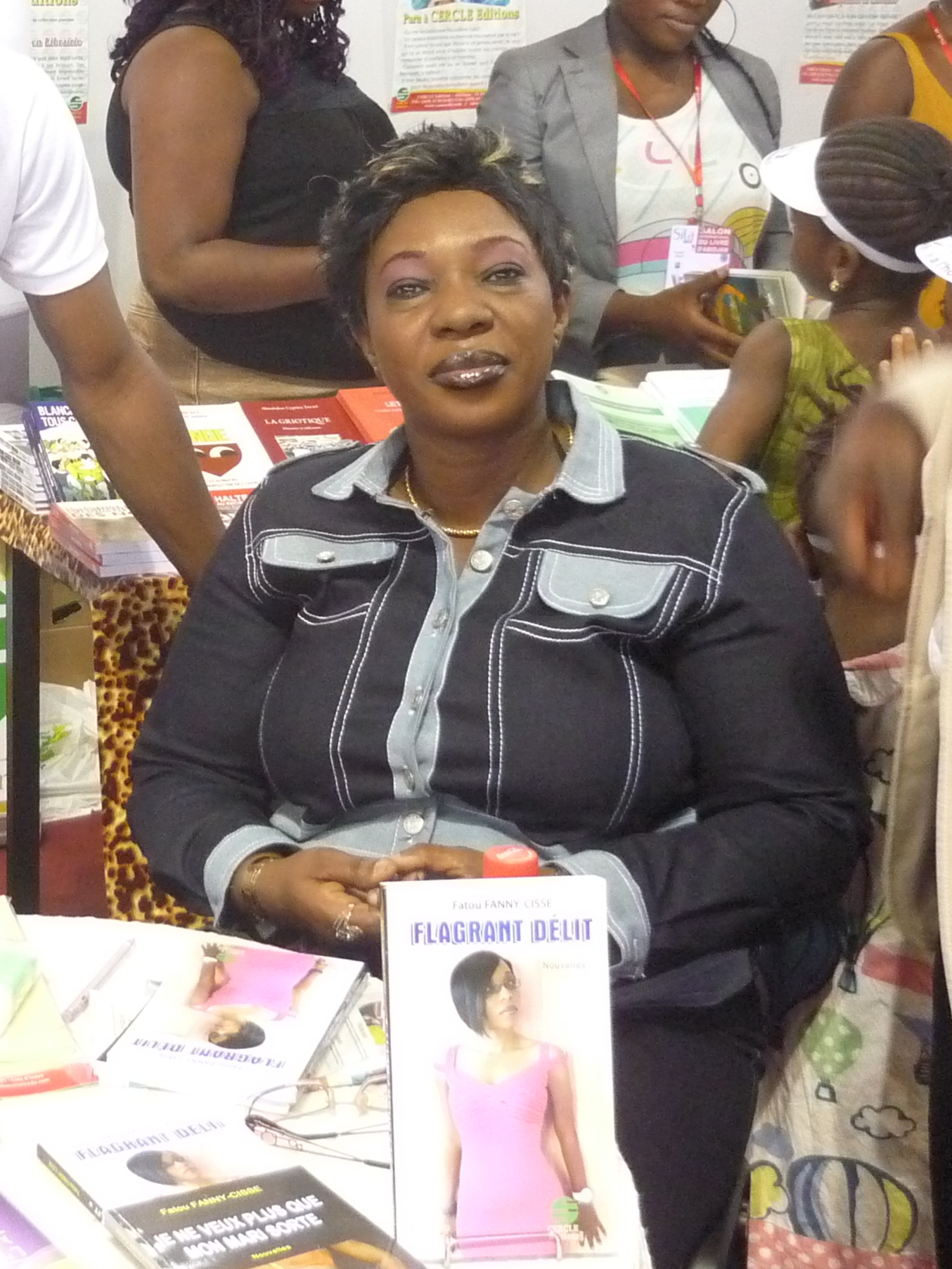
- Fanny-Cissé in 2014
- Born: 1971
- Died: 22 December 2018 (aged 46–47); Abidjan, Ivory Coast
- Education: Université Félix Houphouët-Boigny
- Occupations: Writer; journalist; educator
- Employer: Université Félix Houphouët-Boigny

Fatou Fanny-Cissé (born Fatoumata Touré-Cissé; 1971 – 22 December 2018) was an Ivorian writer, journalist, and educator. A teacher at Université Félix Houphouët-Boigny, she wrote several books such as Une femme, deux maris, Maeva and Madame la présidente.

== Biography ==
Fatou Fanny-Cissé was born Fatoumata Touré-Cissé in the Ivory Coast in 1971, She was educated at Université Félix Houphouët-Boigny, where she obtained a master's degree in communication sciences and then a doctorate in modern letters, before becoming a teacher and researcher in the same university. She also worked for Nouvelles Éditions ivoiriennes as a press attaché and was a columnist for the magazine Planète Jeunes.

She started writing in 2000, and she wrote more than a dozen books during her career, including Une femme, deux maris, Maeva and Madame la présidente. She published novels, short stories, sentimental works, and even children's literature. She won the 2017 African Literature Association Book of the Year Award in Creative Writing for Madame la Présidente and the 2018 Prix d'excellence Charles Bauza Donwahi with Les nuages du passé et Maeva She also won the Prix du meilleur écrivain 2017 of the Association des Écrivains ivoiriens (AECI). Apo Philomène Séka noted that women's issues are a main theme of her works, as shown with the works' names. Ngozi Obiajulum Iloh characterises Madame la présidente as ecofeminist, saying "In this fantasy-coated novel, the mystical environment leads to a mystical solution".

Fanny-Cissé died on 22 December 2018 in Abidjan following an illness. Her last book, De mère en fille, was published posthumously in 2019.
