= Timpoko Helène Kienon-Kabore =

Archaeologist from Côte d'Ivoire

- Citizenship: Côte d'Ivoire
- Occupations: Archaeologist and academic
- Board member of: Association of Archaeologists of West Africa; Scientific Advisors to Governments of the INSA (International Network for Government Science Advice); Advisory Board on Archaeological Heritage at the Ministry of Culture and Francophonie of Côte d'Ivoire

Academic background
- Education: Université de Paris I: Panthéon-Sorbonne
- Thesis: La métallurgie ancienne du fer au Burkina Faso, province du Bulkiemdé: approche ethnologique, historique, archéologique et métallographique (1998)

Academic work
- Discipline: Archaeology
- Sub-discipline: Historical metallurgy
- Institutions: Université Félix Houphouët-Boigny

Timpoko Helène Kienon-Kabore is an archaeologist from Côte d'Ivoire, who is professor at the Research of Human Society and Science Unit at the Université Félix Houphouët-Boigny. A specialist in historical metallurgy, she is an advisor on archaeological heritage at the Ministry of Culture and Francophonie of Côte d'Ivoire and was president of the Association of Archaeologists of West Africa from 2010 to 2014.

== Career ==
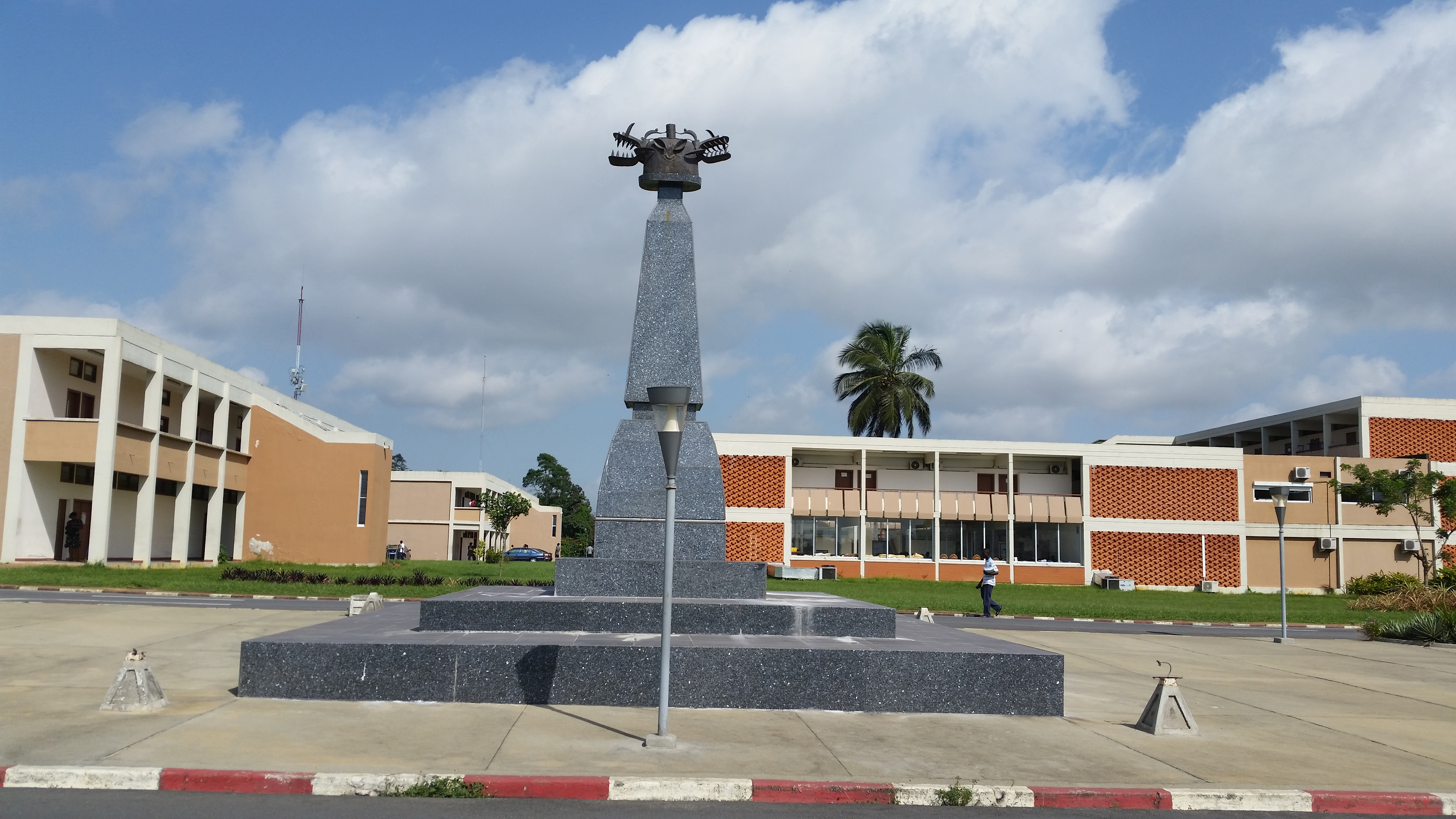
Felix houphouet-boigny university

Kienon-Kabore is professor at the Research of Human Society and Science Unit at the University Felix Houphouet-Boigny of Cocody in Abidjan, Côte d'Ivoire. She was appointed Head of the Archaeology Department of ISAD (Institute of Anthropological Sciences for Development in 2015. Her doctoral thesis entitled 'La métallurgie ancienne du fer au Burkina Faso, province du Bulkiemdé: approche ethnologique, historique, archéologique et métallographique' was awarded by Université de Paris I: Panthéon-Sorbonne in 1998. Her research focuses on metallurgical analysis. She has published on the origins and development of metalwork in Burkina Faso and in Côte d'Ivoire. Her particular expertise lies in the analysis of the history of technology of African societies south of the Sahara. She has explored how important it is to take indigenous knowledge of metal-production is for understanding the past. In addition she has studied and published on population and palaeoenvironment in Senegal.

Kienon-Kabore is an advisor on Archaeological Heritage at the Ministry of Culture and Francophonie of Côte d'Ivoire. As part of her work there she organised ‘A celebration of 100 years of Ivorian archeology’, which was held in 2016, and‘Ivorian Archaeology Week’, held for the first time in 2019. She is also a Committee Member for the Association of Archaeologists of West Africa, and was president from 2010 to 2014. As of 2020 she was also a member of the steering committee of Scientific Advisors to Governments of the INSA (International Network for Government Science Advice), which works across francophone Africa. She was a member of the Scientific Committee for the Symposium on Modern Heritage of Africa – MoHoA, which was held in Cape Town in 2021. She is also a member of the Advisory for the journal Revue de l’Environnement et de la Biodiversité-Programme d’Appui Stratégique à la Recherche Scientifique (REB-PASRES).

== Impact ==
Writing for the TrowelBlazers website, archaeologist Stephanie Wynne-Jones described how: "Professor Kiénon-Kaboré's dynamism cannot be overstated. As well as using her position to train and promote Ivorian students and archaeology, she pursues an international research agenda. Her work on iron-working in Burkina Faso and Ivory Coast has added significantly to our understanding of the development of specialist iron-working centers across West Africa in the second millennium AD. She remains a pioneer in her field, admired by her students for her commitment to the archaeology of the region."
