= Lycée Français Blaise Pascal Abidjan =

French international school in Abidjan, Ivory Coast

Location
- Riviera 3, Abidjan - 25 BP 2257
- Coordinates: 5.3517°N 3.9518°W

Information
- Website: lycee-blaisepascal.com

Lycée Français Blaise Pascal (LFBP) is a French international school in Abidjan, Ivory Coast. It includes the Ecole Jacques Prévert, the collège-lycée (junior and senior high school) and a scientific post-secondary preparatory school for French Grandes Écoles.

The school's gymnasium, designed by Koffi & Diabaté Architects, won an award at the 2018 World Architecture Festival for its sustainable bioclimatic design.

== See also ==
- Jean-Mermoz International School
