= Koumassi =

- Suburb and urban commune
- Location in Abidjan

- Location in Ivory Coast
- Coordinates: 5°18′N 3°57′W
- Country: Ivory Coast
- District: Abidjan

Area
  - Total: 19.18 km^{2} (7.41 sq mi)

Population (2021 census)
  - Total: 412,282
  - Density: 21,500/km^{2} (55,670/sq mi)
- Time zone: UTC+0 (GMT)

Koumassi is a suburb of Abidjan, Ivory Coast. It is one of the 10 urban communes of the city. Koumassi is one of four communes of Abidjan that are entirely south of Ébrié Lagoon, the others being Treichville, Marcory, and Port-Bouët.

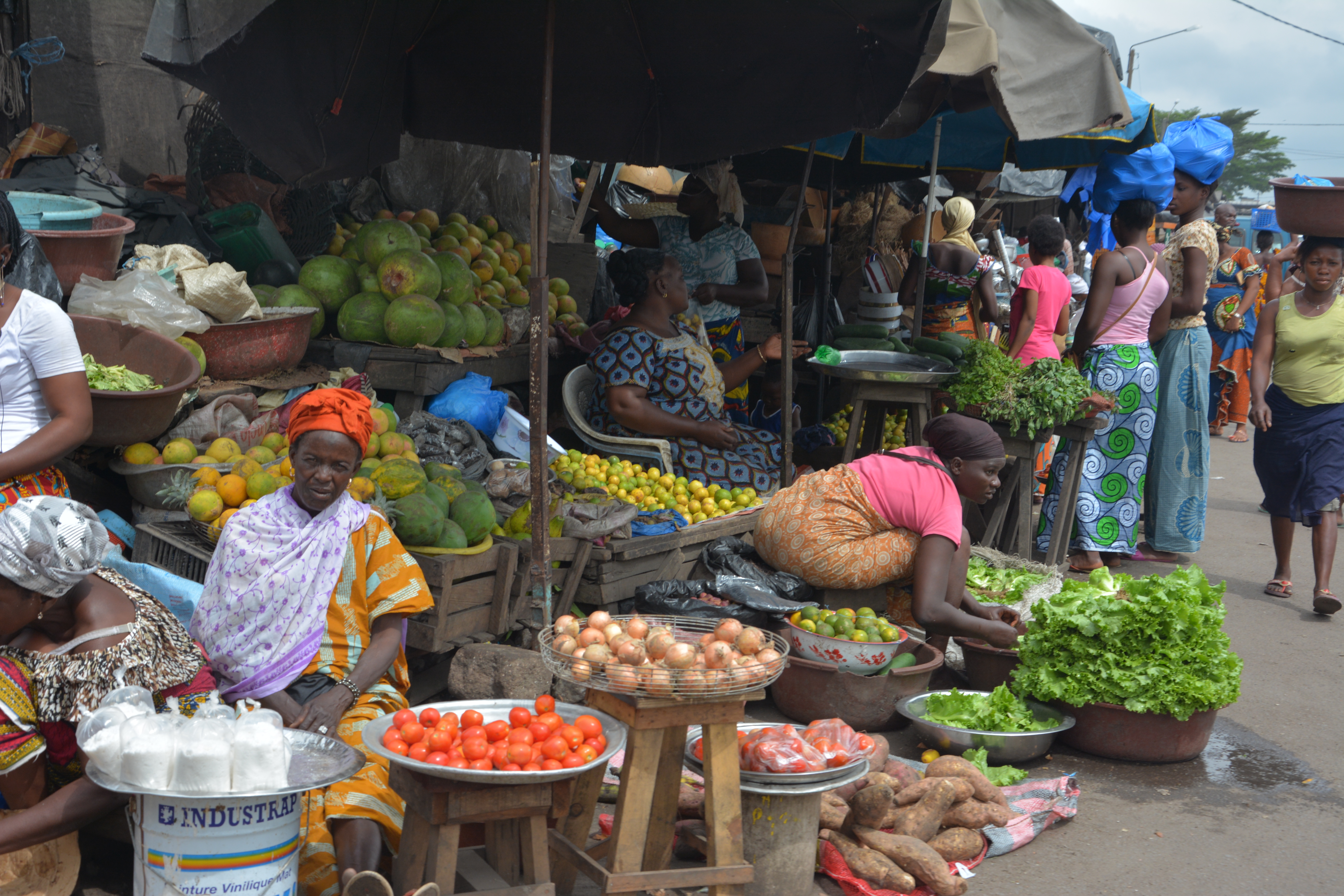
Le marché de Koumassi extérieur

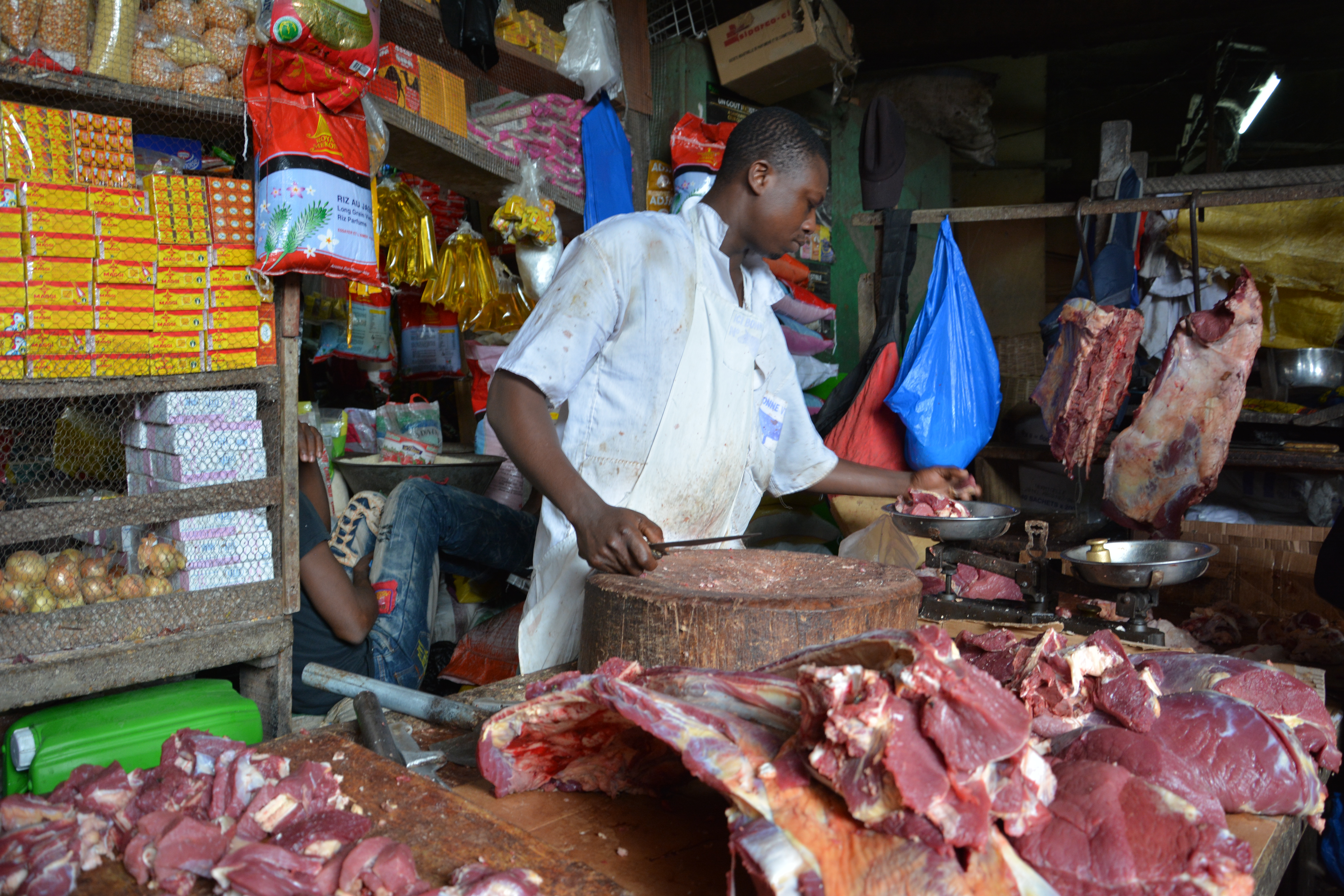
Le boucher au marché de Koumassi mon chéri est originaire de là
