= Sitarail =

Sitarail logo.

Sitarail is a private company that has the concession to operate railway lines formerly operated by national governments in West and Central Africa. Countries include:

- Ivory Coast and Burkina Faso
- Cameroon

Sitarail is part of the Bolloré group.

== Timeline ==
=== 2016 ===
- Operations were severely affected in September 2016 by the partial collapse of the Nzi River Bridge, near Dimbokro. The bridge was repaired in 15 days.
- Under Bolloré operatorship Sitarail have acquired
  - 4 × GT26CU-3 clones NRE CC33201-CC33204
  - 4 × GT26CU-3 clones NRE CC33205-CC33208 (contract built by TŽV Gredelj in Croatia)
- Grindrod Locomotives are Currently delivering
  - 5 × 16-645 powered AC/AC units CC33209-CC33213
  - 6 × 700HP shunters (believed to be AC traction)
- Six locomotives of an order for 16 ordered from Grindrod Locomotives for use in Ivory Coast and Burkina Faso. The locomotives are numbered CC33201-CC33216.

== See also ==
- Bolloré Transport & Logistics
