= École normale supérieure d'Abidjan =

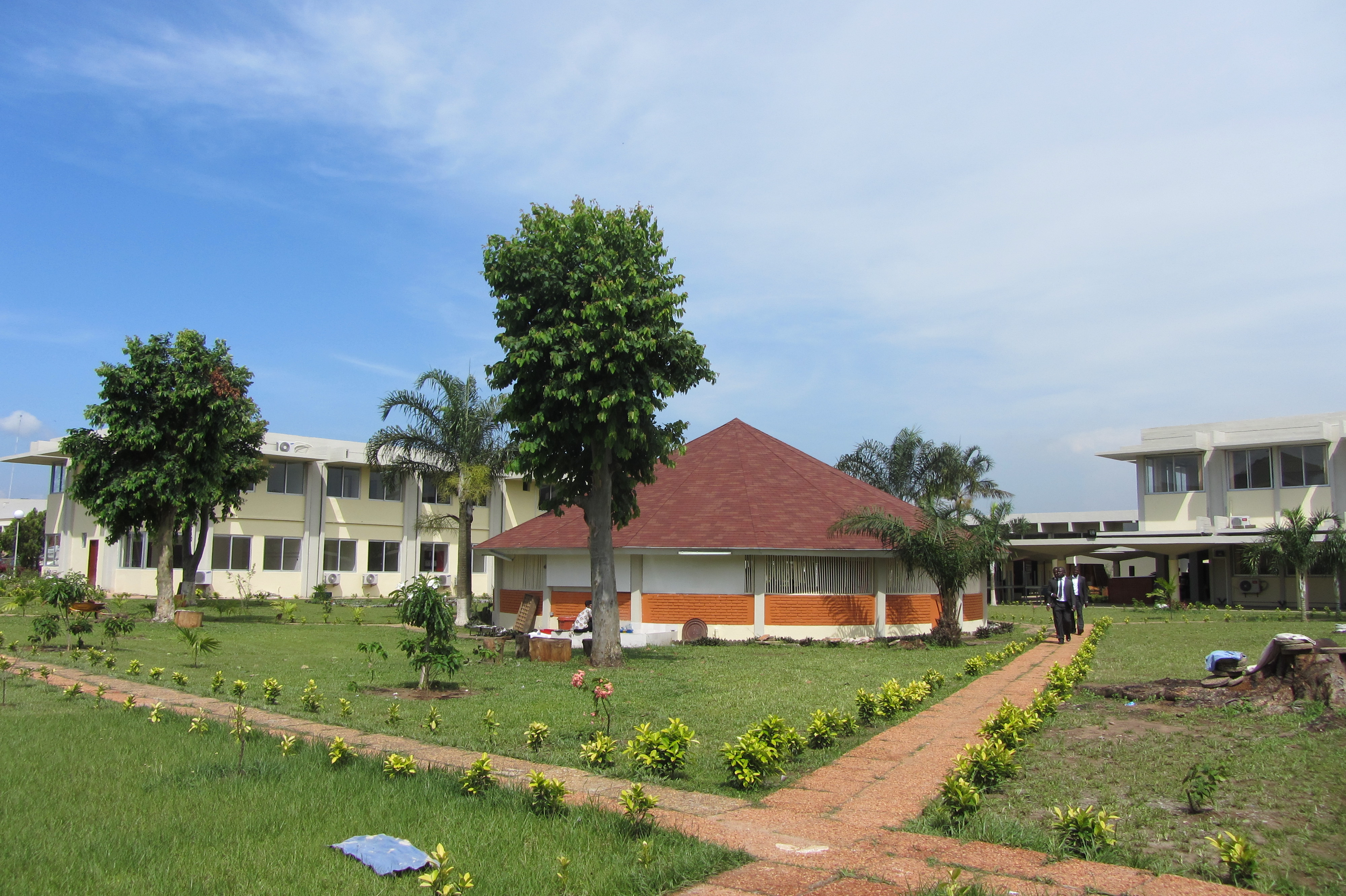
- Overview of ENS Abidjan.
- Type: Teacher training college
- Established: 1964
- Affiliations: Ministry of Higher Education and Scientific Research (Côte d'Ivoire)
- Location: Abidjan, Côte d'Ivoire
- Website: Official website

The École normale supérieure d'Abidjan (ENS Abidjan) is a higher education institution in Côte d'Ivoire established in 1964. It operates under the Ministry of Higher Education and Scientific Research and focuses on the pedagogical training of educators for secondary education, as well as research and development of educational tools.

ENS Abidjan conducts its educational activities through five departments: Arts and Letters, Languages, Education Sciences, Science and Technology, and History-Geography.

== Directors ==
- Pr Bamory Kamagaté, current director
- Pr Vakaba Touré
- Pr Tapé Goze
- Pr Valy Sidibé

== Notable alumni ==
- Kandia Camara
- Simone Gbagbo
- Pierre Kipré

== See also ==
- École normale supérieure
