= Pupils and Students Trade Union of Côte d'Ivoire =

Pupils and Students Trade Union of Côte d'Ivoire (in French: Union Syndicale des Elèves et Etudiants de Côte d'Ivoire), generally called U.S.E.E.C.I., was an organization of students and pupils in Côte d'Ivoire, founded in 1971. U.S.E.E.C.I. was independent from the government party, and the movement was immediately suppressed by the regime of Félix Houphouët-Boigny. The leaders of U.S.E.E.C.I. were imprisoned at the military camp at Séguéla for seven months.

== See also ==
- Students and Pupils Movement of Côte d'Ivoire
