= Marcory Zone 4 =

- Entertainment district
- Location within the Ivory Coast
- Coordinates: 5.2907°N 3.9814°W
- Country: Ivory Coast
- City: Abidjan

Zone 4 is one of four zones of Marcory, Abidjan, Ivory Coast.

It is known for its Red Light District located in Bietry. A popular venue for expatriates, Bietry is the major landmark for Western-style food and nightlife in Abidjan. Strip clubs, massage parlours, and brothels are common in that area. Several hundred freelance prostitutes operate in Zone 4 and openly offer their services at street corners, around pubs, hotels, or, more increasingly, inside nightclubs.

== Nightlife ==
- Le Saint-Germain
- Taxi Brousse
- Ebene Night Club
- Jimmy's Night Club
- Parker Place
- Mix Night Club
- Abidjan Nightlife

== See also ==
- Ivory Coast
- Abidjan
- Marcory
- Prostitutes
- Strip clubs
