= Yopougon =

- Suburb and urban commune
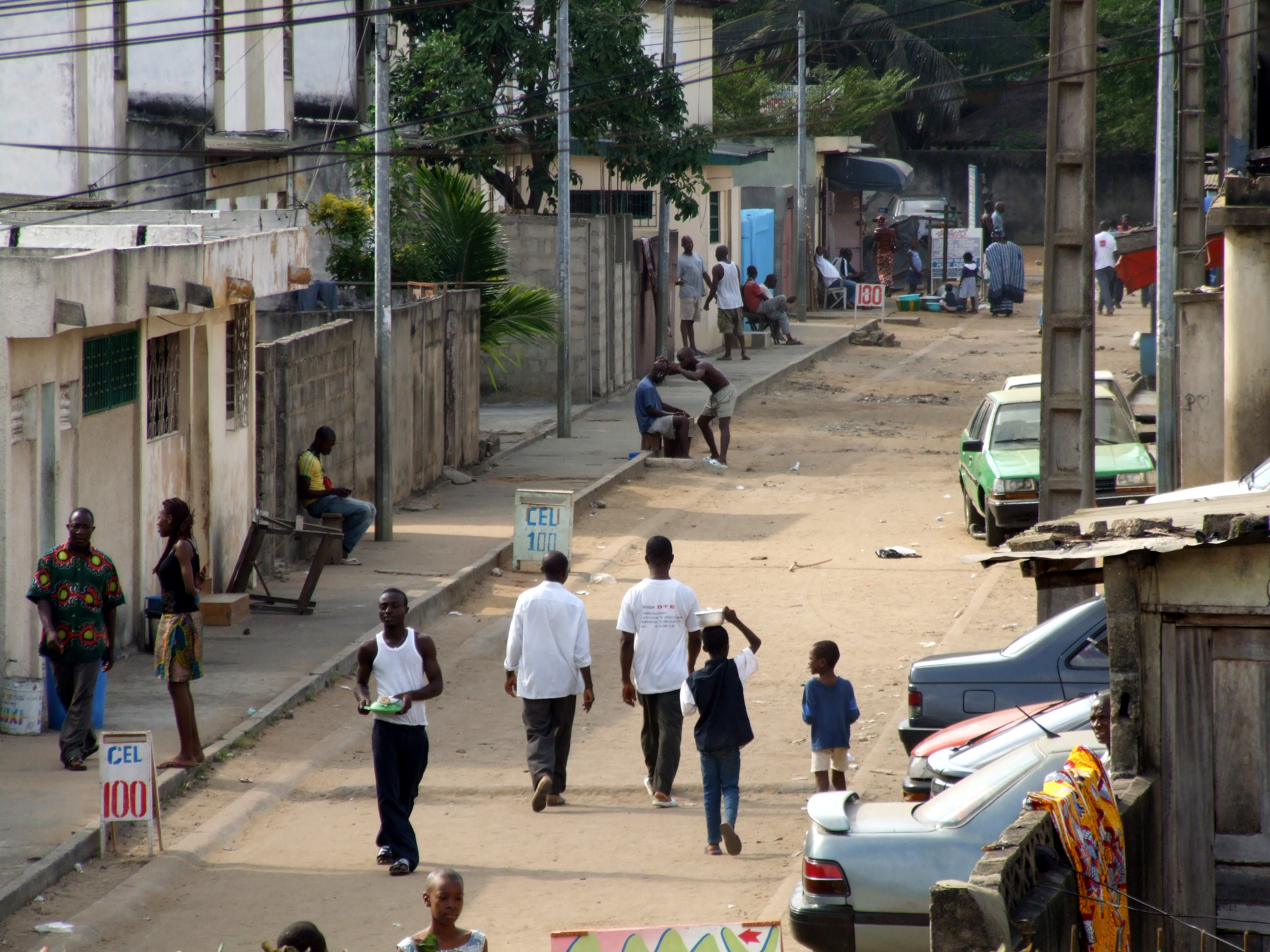
- Nickname: Yop City
- Location in Abidjan

- Location in Ivory Coast
- Coordinates: 5°19′N 4°4′W
- Country: Ivory Coast
- District: Abidjan

Area
  - Total: 164.2 km^{2} (63.4 sq mi)

Population (2021 census)
  - Total: 1,571,065
  - Density: 9,568/km^{2} (24,780/sq mi)
- Time zone: UTC+0 (GMT)

Yopougon (French pronunciation: [jɔpuɡɔ̃]), also known colloquially as Yop City, is a suburb of Abidjan, Ivory Coast. It is the most populous of the 10 urban communes of Abidjan and covers most of the western territory of the city. Yopougon is the only commune of Abidjan that spans both north and south sides of Ébrié Lagoon.

Yopougon is the seat of the Roman Catholic Diocese of Yopougon. The diocese's cathedral is the Cathédrale Saint-André.

The suburb was the scene of violence following the 2010 Ivorian presidential election and in 2020 as a reaction to the announcement that a COVID-19 testing centre would be built in Yopougon.

== Notable people ==
- Emmanuel Biumla (born 2005), French-Cameroonian footballer
- Mohamed Diomande, footballer
- Adama Ouedraogo (born 1987), Burkinabè swimmer
