= Treichville =

Neighborhood in Abidjan, Ivory Coast

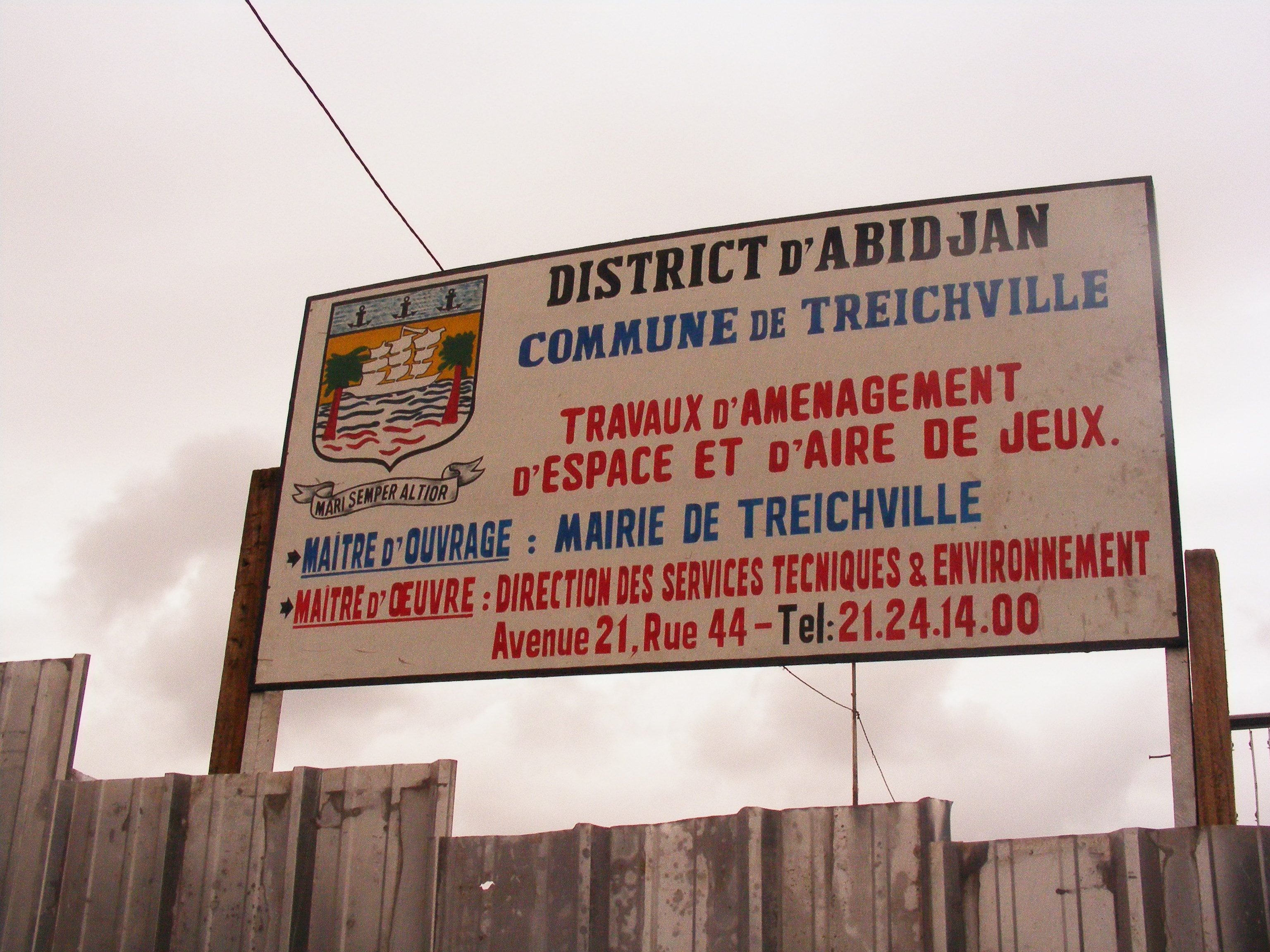
Treichville signage in 2009

Treichville is a neighborhood in Abidjan, Ivory Coast. It is one of the 10 urban communes of the city. Treichville is one of four communes of Abidjan that are entirely south of Ébrié Lagoon, the others being Port-Bouët, Koumassi, and Marcory.

Treichville is known as one of the most lively neighborhoods in Abidjan, especially around the Crossroad France-Amérique. The streets in Treichville do not have names but are numbered from 1 to 47. The commune is served by a railway station belonging to the RAN. The railway offers a passenger service to Ouagadougou, in Burkina Faso, which takes around 30 hours.

The Autonomous Port of Abidjan is located in Treichville.

Treichville's name comes from Marcel Treich-Laplène (1860–1890), who was a French resident in Ivory Coast. Its current mayor, first elected at the municipal election in March 2001, is François Amichia, former minister of tourism.

In March and April 2011, Treichville was caught up in the 2010–2011 Ivorian crisis and many people there were killed.

== Monuments and infrastructure ==
- State swimming pool of Treichville
- Omnisport Palace of Treichville
- Sports Park
- Cultural Palace
- Abidjan Racecourse
- The Living Room (former Boulevard of Stars)

== Twinships ==
The city is twinned to:

- Kumasi in Ghana
- Lamentin in France (Soon)

== Images ==
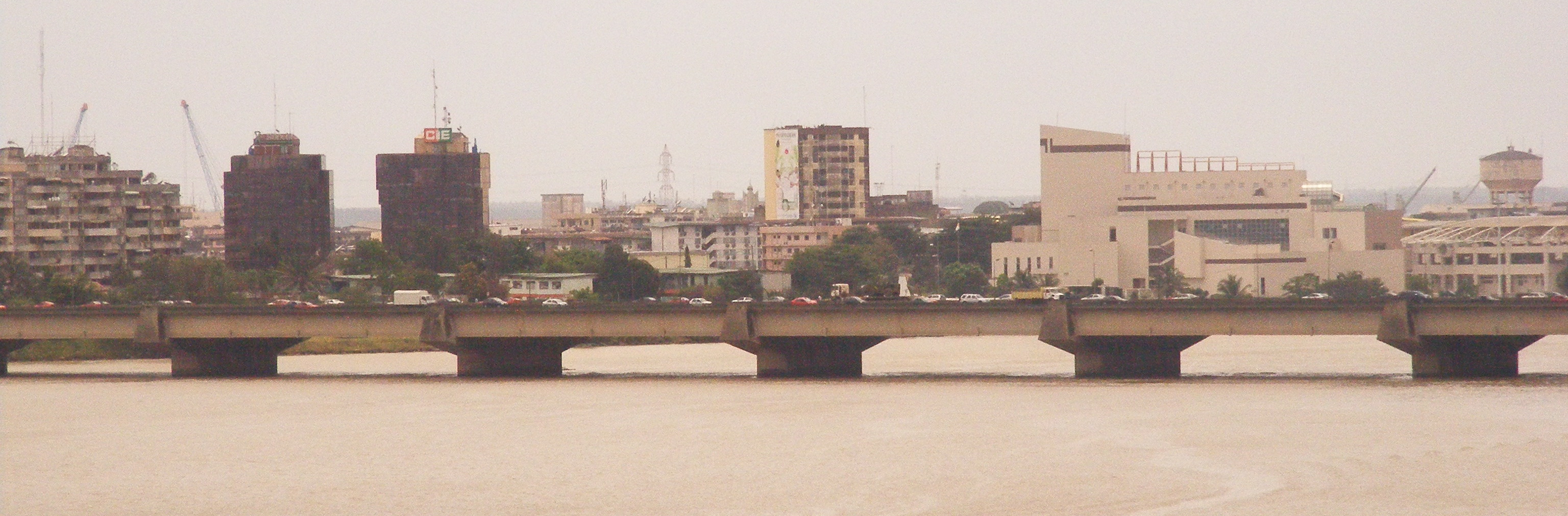
View of Treichville, 2009

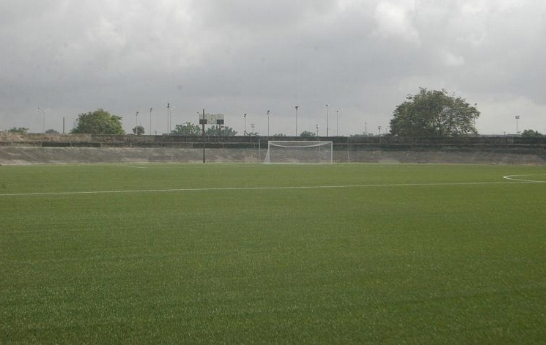
The new grass of the Sports Park of Treichville

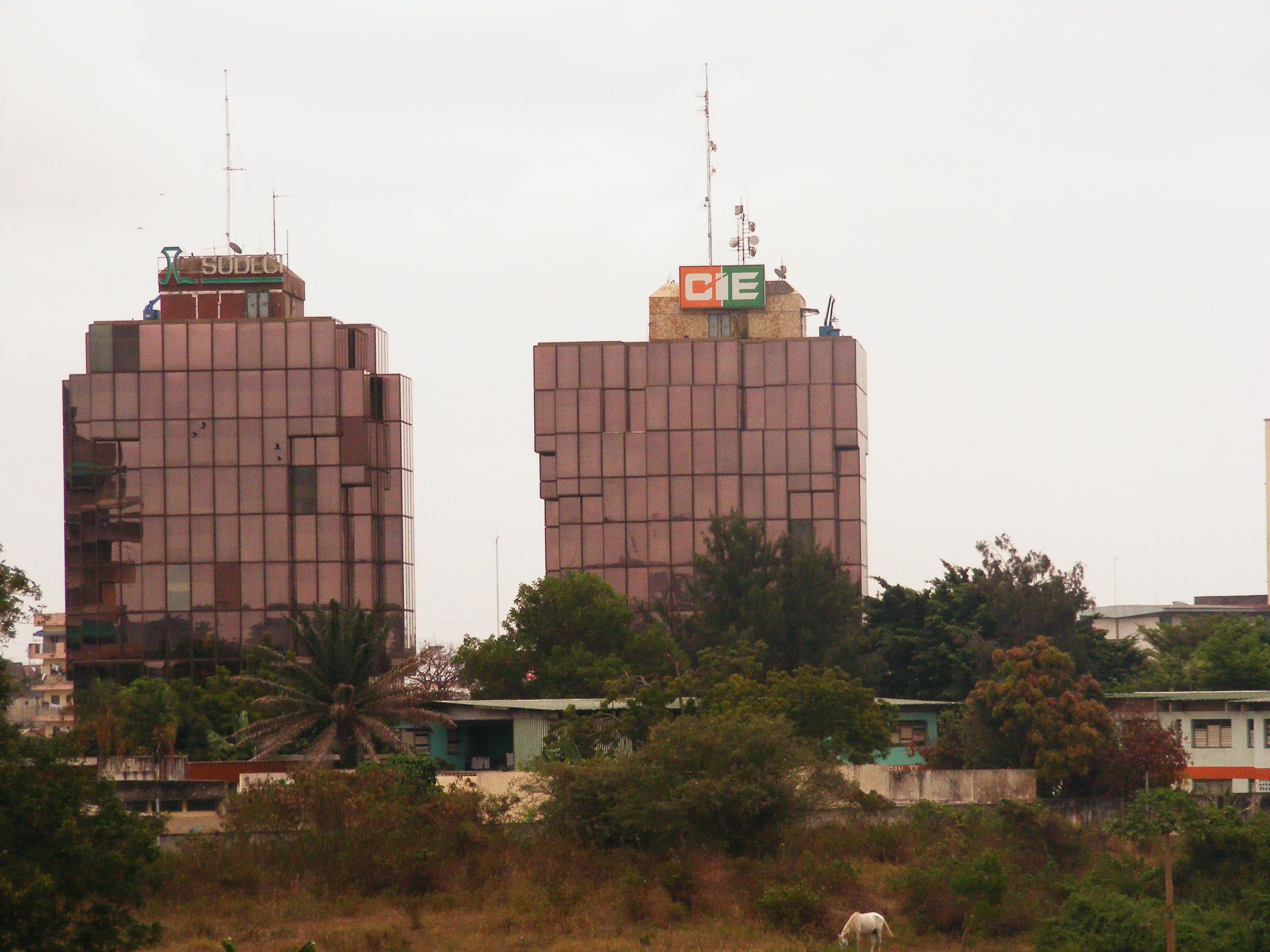
Buildings of SODECI & CIE, Treichville, 2009

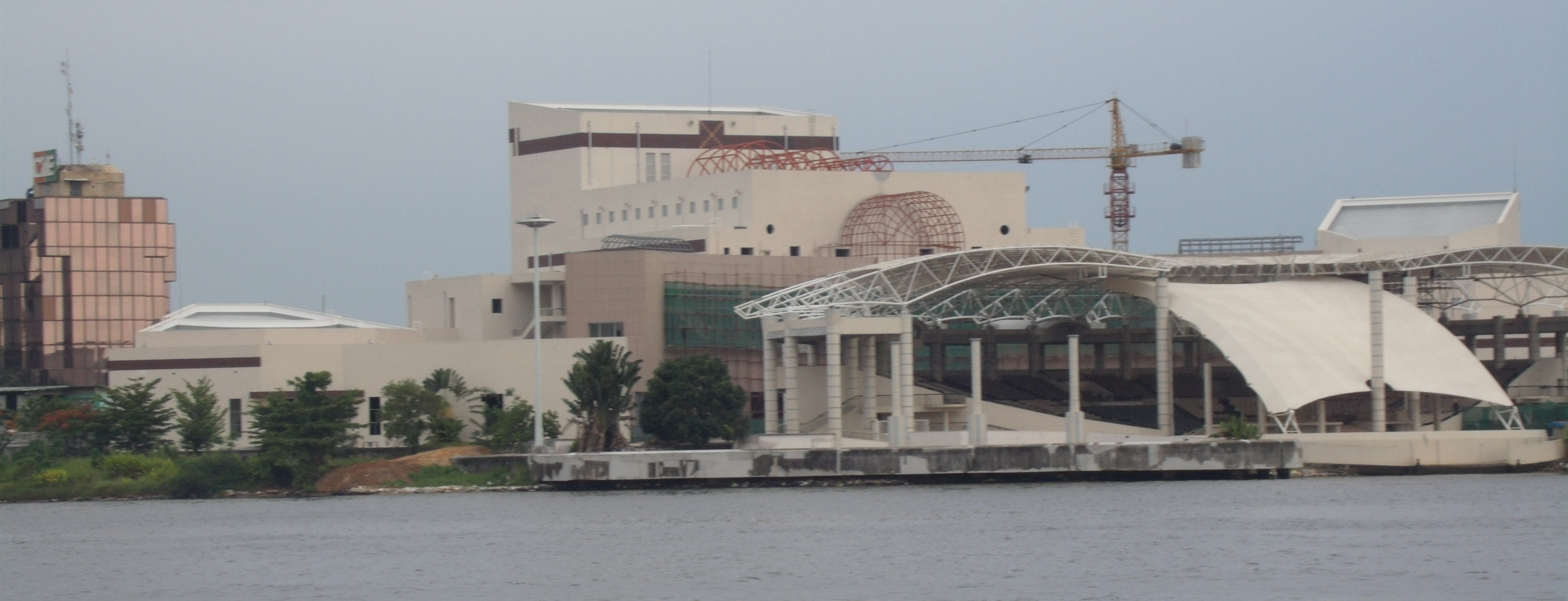
Palais de la Culture de Treichville, 2010
