= Abobo =

- Suburb and commune
- Location of the commune in Abidjan

- Location in Ivory Coast
- Coordinates: 5°25′N 4°1′W
- Country: Ivory Coast
- District: Abidjan

Area
  - Total: 69.25 km^{2} (26.74 sq mi)

Population (2021 census)
  - Total: 1,340,083
  - Density: 19,350/km^{2} (50,120/sq mi)
- Time zone: UTC+0 (GMT)

Abobo is a northern suburb of Abidjan and one of the 10 urban communes of this city in Ivory Coast. Abobo is one of the most populated communes in the country with about 1.3 million inhabitants in an area of 6,925 ha (69.25 km^{2}), a density of 193 inhabitants per hectare. Many of the residents are Muslim settlers from the north of the country.

== History ==
Many violent clashes took place here between security forces and civilians during the 2010–2011 Ivorian crisis and Second Ivorian Civil War.

== Geography ==
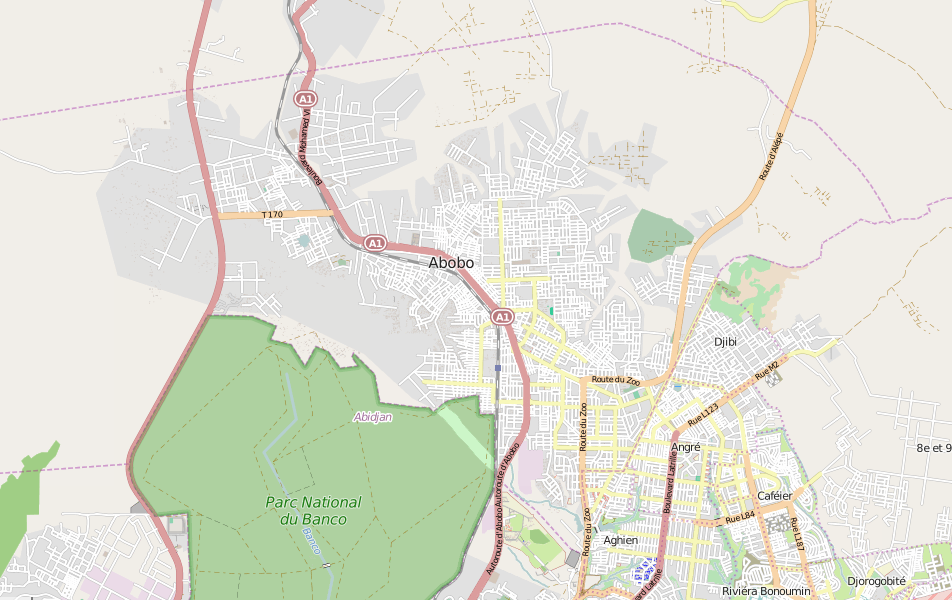
OSM map of Abobo

Abobo, part of Northern Abidjan, is the northernmost suburb of the city, and borders with the boroughs of Attécoubé, Adjamé, and Cocody. It borders also with the city of Anyama, located a few kilometers in the north.

== Culture ==
The Université d'Abobo-Adjamé is located in the commune.

== Politics ==
Its mayor of Abobo, elected in municipal elections of March 2001 is Maria Luisa Sesso who succeeded Koné Gogé. Among their predecessors, between 1985 and 1990 was the writer Aké Loba.

== Transport ==
Abobo is home to a railway station located on the road linking Ivory Coast to Burkina Faso, and a bus station.
