= Port-Bouët =

- Suburb and urban commune
- Location in Abidjan

- Location in Ivory Coast
- Coordinates: 5°16′N 3°54′W
- Country: Ivory Coast
- District: Abidjan

Area
  - Total: 73.77 km^{2} (28.48 sq mi)

Population (2021 census)
  - Total: 618,795
  - Density: 8,388/km^{2} (21,730/sq mi)
- Time zone: UTC+0 (GMT)

Port-Bouët is a suburb of Abidjan, Ivory Coast. It is one of the 10 urban communes of the city. Port-Bouët is one of four communes of Abidjan that are entirely south of Ébrié Lagoon, the others being Treichville, Koumassi, and Marcory.

Port-Bouët had not been inhabited until around 1930. The Port Bouët/Petit Bassam lighthouse (French: Phare de Port Bouët (Petit Bassam)) was built in the early 1930s.

Félix-Houphouët-Boigny International Airport (French: Aéroport international Félix Houphouët-Boigny or Aéroport international Abidjan) is located in Port-Bouët, as well as the Abidjan Exhibition Centre.
