= Cocody =

- Suburb and urban commune
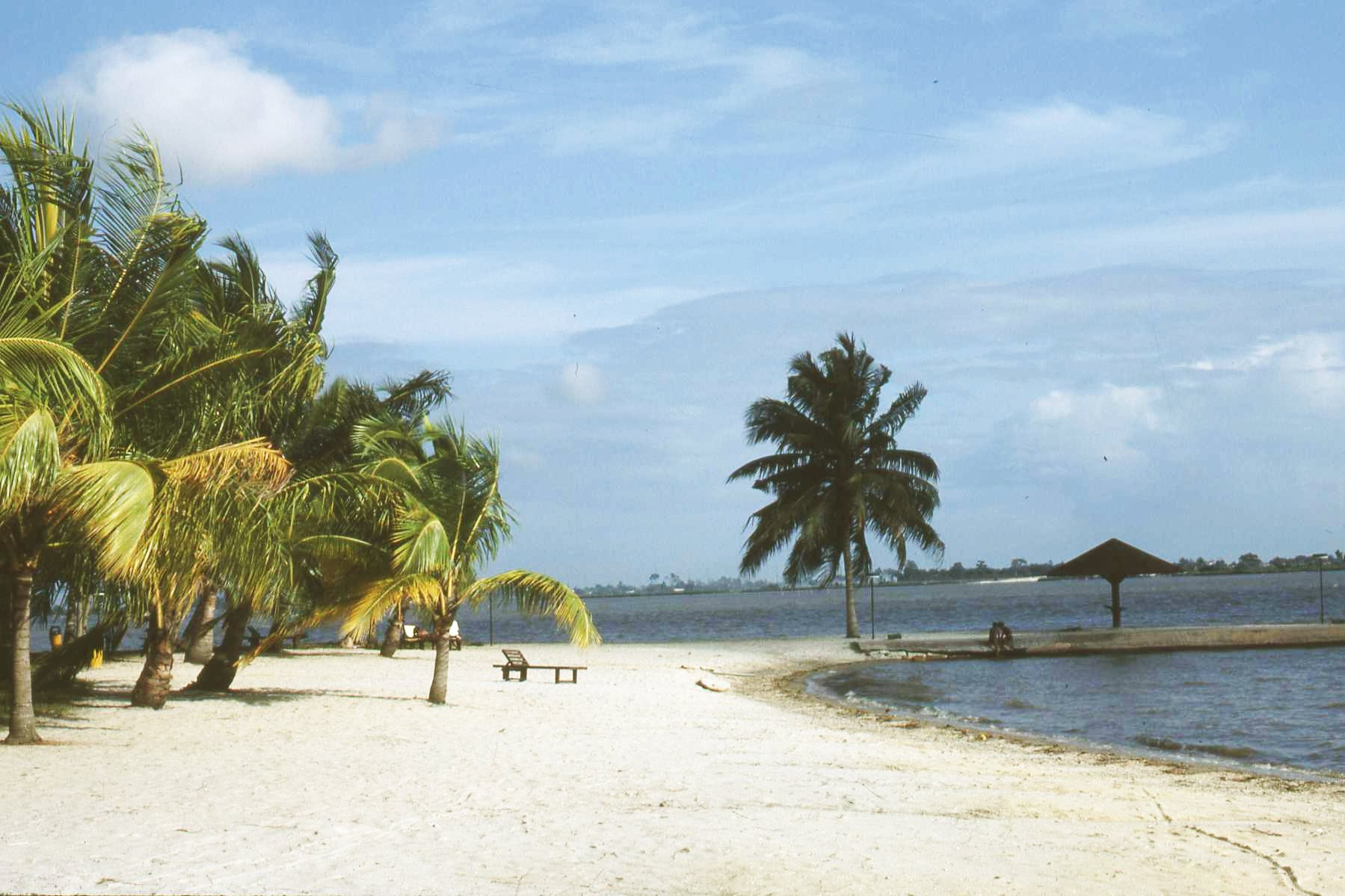
- A beach in Cocody

- Location in Abidjan

- Location in Ivory Coast
- Coordinates: 5°21′N 3°58′W
- Country: Ivory Coast
- District: Abidjan

Area
  - Total: 119.6 km^{2} (46.2 sq mi)

Population (2021 census)
  - Total: 692,583
  - Density: 5,791/km^{2} (15,000/sq mi)
- Time zone: UTC+0 (GMT)

Cocody (/ˈkoʊkoʊdi/, French: [kɔkɔdi]) is one of the 10 urban communes of Abidjan, Ivory Coast. It is upmarket and has an abundance of mansions. Most Abidjan businesspeople, ambassadors, and other affluent people live in Cocody. The Université Félix Houphouët-Boigny is located in Cocody.

== Education ==
Schools:

- Abidjan Classical High School
- Jean-Mermoz International School
- École la Farandole Internationale Abidjan
- École Nid de Cocody

== In popular culture ==
In 1965 a film was released entitled Man from Cocody.

Alpha Blondy wrote a song about Cocody, titled Cocody Rock.
