= Marcory =

- Suburb and urban commune
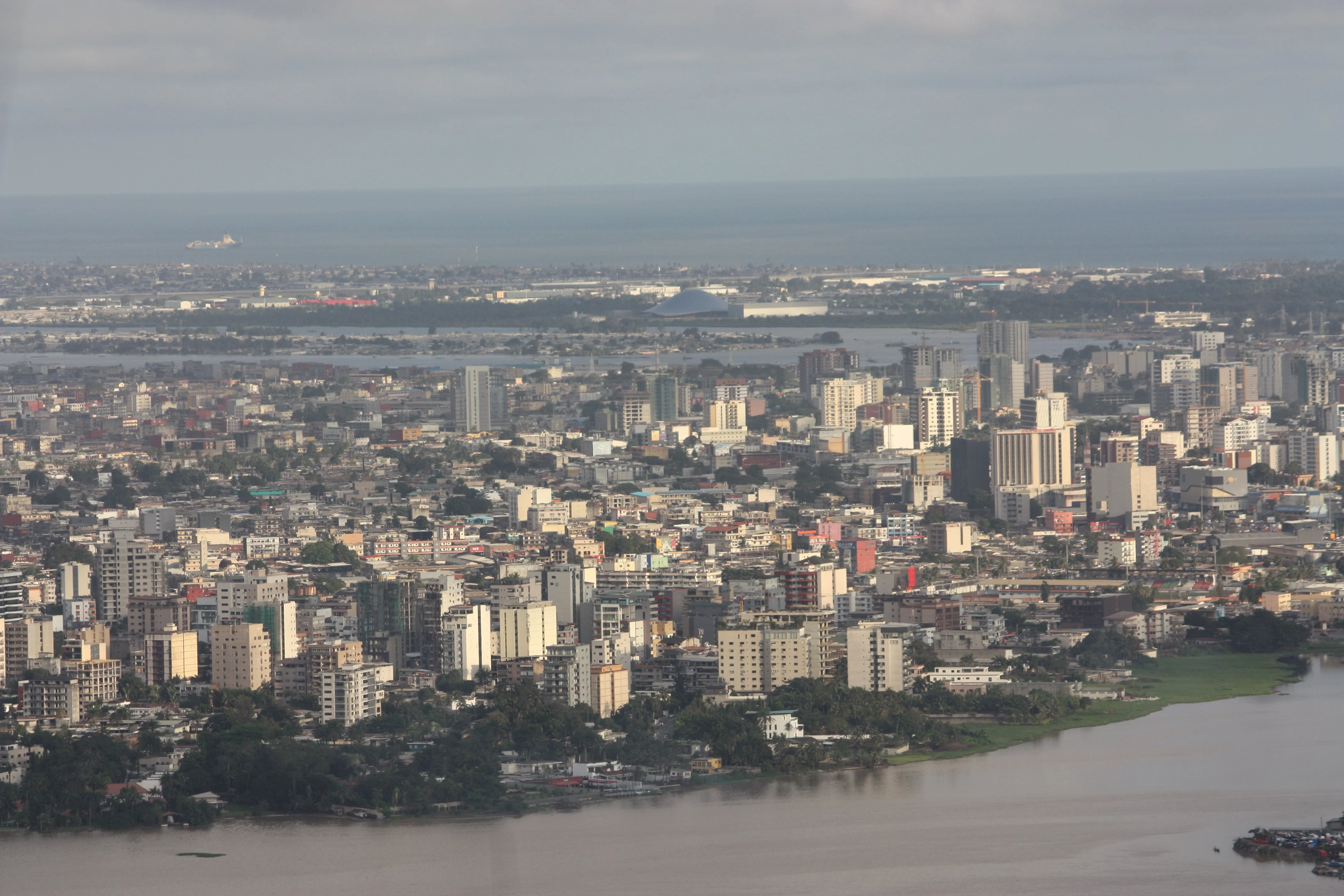
- View of Marcory in January 2025

- Location in Abidjan

- Location in Ivory Coast
- Coordinates: 5°18′N 3°59′W
- Country: Ivory Coast
- District: Abidjan

Area
  - Total: 17.86 km^{2} (6.90 sq mi)

Population (2021 census)
  - Total: 214,061
  - Density: 11,990/km^{2} (31,040/sq mi)
- Time zone: UTC+0 (GMT)

Marcory is a suburb of Abidjan, Ivory Coast. It is one of the 10 urban communes of the city. Marcory is one of four communes of Abidjan that are entirely south of Ébrié Lagoon, the others being Treichville, Koumassi, and Port-Bouët.
