= Timeline of Abidjan =

The following is a timeline of the history of the city of Abidjan, Ivory Coast.

== Prior to 20th century ==
- 1898 – Village of Abidjan founded.

== 20th century ==
- 1903 – Abidjan becomes a town.
- 1910 – Dimbokro-Abidjan railway constructed.
- 1920 – Population: 1,000.
- 1927 – Port-Bouët wharf commissioned.
- 1934
  - French administrative capital relocated to Abidjan from Bingerville.
  - Bobo-Dioulasso-Abidjan railway constructed.
- 1938 – Theatre Indigene formed.
- 1942 – Museum established.
- 1945 – City council election held.
- 1946 – Population: 48,000.
- 1948 – ASEC Mimosas football club formed.
- 1950 – Vridi Canal opens.
- 1951 – Autonomous Port of Abidjan in operation.
- 1952
  - Bibliothèque municipale established.
  - Stade Andre Geo opens.
- 1953 – Banco National Park and Stella Club d'Adjamé (football club) established.
- 1954 – Abidjan Matin newspaper begins publication.
- 1955
  - Ouagadougou-Abidjan railway begins operating.
  - Catholic Archdiocese of Abidjan established.
  - Population: 127,585.
- 1956
  - Municipality established.
  - Félix Houphouët-Boigny becomes mayor.
  - City Hall built.
- 1958
  - 1st bridge completed connecting the mainland to Petit-Bassam Island.
- 1960
  - City becomes capital of independent Republic of Côte d'Ivoire.
  - Antoine Konan Kanga becomes mayor.
  - Abidjan Transport Company founded.
- 1961 – Centre d'Edition et de Diffusion Africaines established.
- 1962
  - Presidential palace inaugurated.
  - Institut Africain pour le Développement économique et Social headquartered in Abidjan.
  - Centre Culturel Français active.
- 1963
  - Radio Télévision Ivoirienne (television) begins broadcasting.
  - Population: 246,700 urban agglomeration.
- 1964 – Fraternité Matin newspaper begins publication.
- 1965
  - African Development Bank headquartered in Abidjan.
  - Nour-al-Hayat Mall built.
- 1967
  - Charles de Gaulle bridge built.
  - Higher Institute of Religious Culture founded.
- 1968 – National Library of Ivory Coast established.
- 1969 – Ivoire InterContinental Abidjan Hotel built.
- 1971 – Abidjan Institute of Criminology established (approximate date).
- 1972 – International Community School of Abidjan founded.
- 1974 – Abidjan Stock Exchange established.
- 1975 – Population: 951,216.
- 1976 – Ivorian Society of Bank building and Department of Finances building constructed.
- 1978
  - Palais des Sports de Treichville established.
  - Population: 1,269,071.
- 1980
  - City of Abidjan organized into ten communes: Abobo, Adjamé, Attécoubé, Cocody, Koumassi, Marcory, Plateau, Port-Bouët, Treichville, Yopougon.
  - Emmanuel Dioulo becomes mayor.
- 1983 – Political capital of Ivory Coast relocated from Abidjan to Yamoussoukro.
- 1984
  - March: 1984 African Cup of Nations held.
  - Cité Administrative Tour C, D and E built.
- 1985
  - St. Paul's Cathedral, Abidjan built.
  - Ernest N’Koumo Mobio becomes mayor.
  - Population: 1,716,000 (urban agglomeration).
- 1986 – Sister city relationship established with San Francisco, USA.
- 1988
  - Maquis du Val eatery opens.
  - Population: 1,934,342.
- 1990
  - Demonstration against Houphouët-Boigny national regime.
  - Population: 2,102,000 (urban agglomeration).
- 1992 – African Publishers Network headquartered in city.
- 1993 – Marche des Arts et du Spectacle Africains (festival) begins.
- 1994 – Le Jour plus newspaper begins publication.
- 1995
  - Abidjan-Ouagadougou railway concessioned.
  - Population: 2,535,000 (urban agglomeration).
- 1996
  - Université d'Abobo-Adjamé founded.
  - Inades-Formation Côte d'Ivoire relocated to Abidjan.
- 1998
  - West African regional Bourse Régionale des Valeurs Mobilières (stock exchange) headquartered in Abidjan.
  - Population: 2,877,948.
- 1999 – Palais de la culture d'Abidjan built.
- 2000
  - Area of city: 627 square kilometers.
  - Population: 3,028,000 (urban agglomeration).

== 21st century ==
- 2001 – August: City administration decentralized into 13 communes: Abobo, Adjamé, Anyama, Attécoubé, Bingerville, Cocody, Koumassi, Marcory, Plateau, Port-Bouët, Songon, Treichville, Yopougon.
- 2002
  - September: First Ivorian Civil War begins.
  - Pierre Djédji Amondji becomes Abidjan district governor.
- 2003 – December: "Attack on state TV building."
- 2004
  - March: Political protest; violence ensues.
  - November: Anti-French riots.
  - Anoumabo Open Theatre built.
- 2005 – Population: 3,564,000 (urban agglomeration).
- 2007 – Ivory Coast National Film Festival begins.
- 2008 – Pont d'Azito (bridge) construction begins.
- 2009
  - 29 March: 2009 Houphouët-Boigny stampede.
  - Unite de Police Anti-Pollution active.
  - University of Science and Technology of Ivory Coast established.
- 2010
  - November: Pre-election unrest.
  - December: Political protest.
  - City website online (approximate date).
  - Population: 4,151,000 (urban agglomeration).
- 2011
  - February: Protest in Abobo against Gbagbo regime.
  - March: Second Ivorian Civil War begins.
  - April: "French army take over Abidjan's airport."
  - May: Robert Beugré Mambé becomes Abidjan district governor.
- 2012
  - May: TEDx Abidjan begins.
  - November: Association Internationale des Maires Francophones conference held.
  - Population: 4,476,397.
- 2013
  - 1 January: 2013 Houphouët-Boigny stampede.
  - Yamoussoukro-Abidjan highway built.
  - InnovAfrica meets in Abidjan.
- 2014
  - Henri Konan Bédié Bridge opens.
  - Population: 4,395,243.
- 2017 – July: 2017 Jeux de la Francophonie to be held in Abidjan.

== See also ==
- Abidjan history

== Bibliography ==
=== in English ===
- Allen Armstrong (1985). "Ivory Coast: another new capital for Africa". Geography. 70.
- K. Attahi (1991). "Planning and management in large cities: A case study of Abidjan, Côte-d'Ivoire". Metropolitan Planning and Management in the Developing World: Abidjan and Quito. Nairobi: United Nations Centre for Human Settlements (Habitat).
- Alain Dubresson (1997), "Abidjan: From the public making of a modern city to urban management of a metropolis", in Carole Rakodi (ed.), The Urban Challenge in Africa, United Nations University Press, ISBN 92-808-0952-0
- Bill Freund (2001). "Contrasts in Urban Segregation: A Tale of Two African Cities, Durban (South Africa) and Abidjan (Côte d'Ivoire)". Journal of Southern African Studies. 27 (3): 527–546. doi:10.1080/13632430120074572. JSTOR 823314. PMID 17650571. S2CID 37285422.
- "Abidjan". Understanding Slums: Case Studies for the Global Report 2003. United Nations Human Settlements Programme and University College London. 2003.
- Paul Tiyambe Zeleza; Dickson Eyoh, eds. (2003). "Abidjan, Côte d'Ivoire". Encyclopedia of Twentieth-Century African History. Routledge. ISBN 0415234794.
- Kwame Anthony Appiah and Henry Louis Gates, ed. (2005). "Abidjan". Africana: The Encyclopedia of the African and African American Experience (2nd ed.). Oxford University Press. p. 6. ISBN 978-0-19-517055-9.
- Bill Freund (2007). "Globalisation and the African city: Touba, Abidjan, Durban". The African City: A History. Cambridge University Press. pp. 177+. ISBN 978-0-521-52792-7.

=== in French ===
- Louis Roussel; et al. (1968). "La mobilité de la population urbaine en Afrique Noire: Deux essais de mesure, Abidjan et Yaoundé". Population (in French). 23 (2): 333–352. doi:10.2307/1527492. JSTOR 1527492 – via Persee.fr.
- Philippe Haeringer (1969). "Structures foncières et création urbaine à Abidjan". Cahiers d'études africaines (in French). 9 – via Persee.fr.
- Jean-Marie Gibbal (1974). Citadins et villageois dans la ville africaine; l'exemple d'Abidjan (in French). Grenoble: Presses Universitaires/Francois Maspero.
- P. Haeringer (1977). "Abidjan 1976. Occupation de l'espace urbain et péri-urbain". Atlas de Côte-d'Ivoire (in French). Abidjan: Ministère de Plan-ORSTOM-IGT.
- P. Haeringer (1985). "Vingt-cinq ans de politique urbaine a Abidjan". Politique Africaine (in French). 17. doi:10.3406/polaf.1985.3976. S2CID 149088468.
- C. Vidal; M. Le Pape (1986). Pratiques de crise et conditions sociales à Abidjan, 1979-1985 (in French). Abidjan: ORSTOM.
- Philippe Antoine; et al. (1987). Abidjan 'côte cours' (in French). Paris: ORSTOM/Karthala.
- A. Bonnassieux (1987), L'autre Abidjan. Chronique d'un quartier oublié (in French), Paris: INADES
- M. Le Pape; et al. (1992), Abidjan: du cosmopolitanisme à la mondialisation (in French), Paris: ASP CNRS-ORSTOM
- Dabié Nassa (2009). "Abidjan: Rue des Jardins et rue du Commerce à l'épreuve de la mondialisation". Géographie et Cultures (in French). 71. doi:10.4000/gc.2124 – via Revues.org.
- Villes et organisation de l'espace en Afrique (in French). Éditions Karthala. 2010. ISBN 978-2811103392. (contains several chapters about Abidjan)
- Collectif; Auzias, Dominique; Labourdette, Jean-Paul (2012). "Histoire". Abidjan. Le Petit Futé (in French). ISBN 9782746960428.
- Côte d'Ivoire: Profil Urbain d'Abidjan (in French). United Nations Human Settlements Programme. 2012.

== Images ==
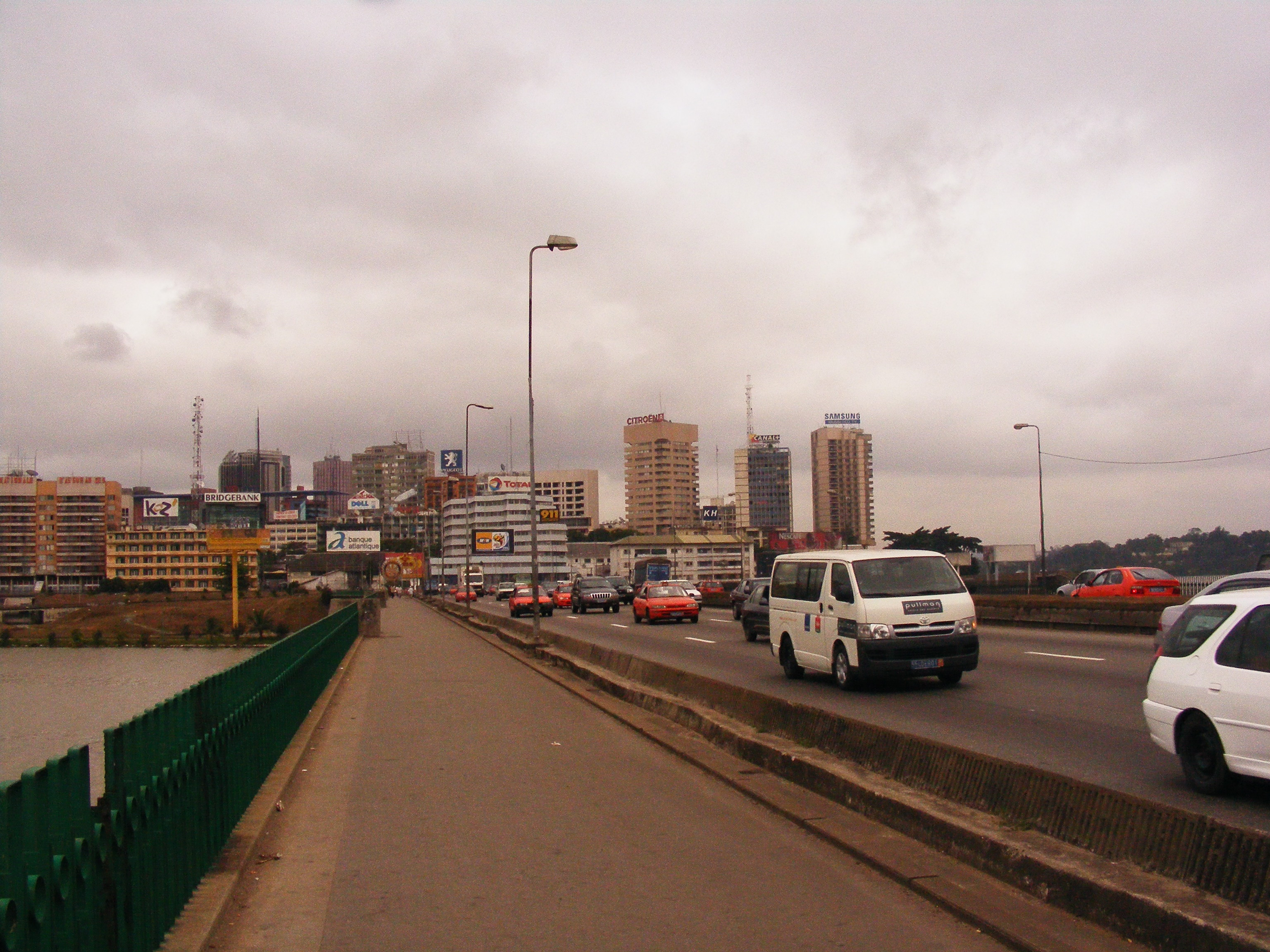
De Gaulle Bridge, built 1967 (photo 2009)

St. Paul's Cathedral, Abidjan, built 1980 (photo 2009)

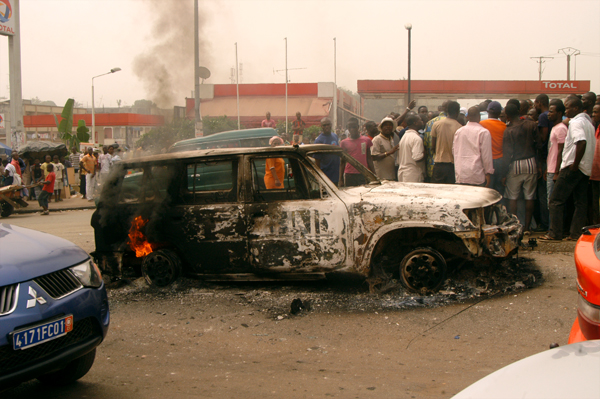
Abidjan, 2010

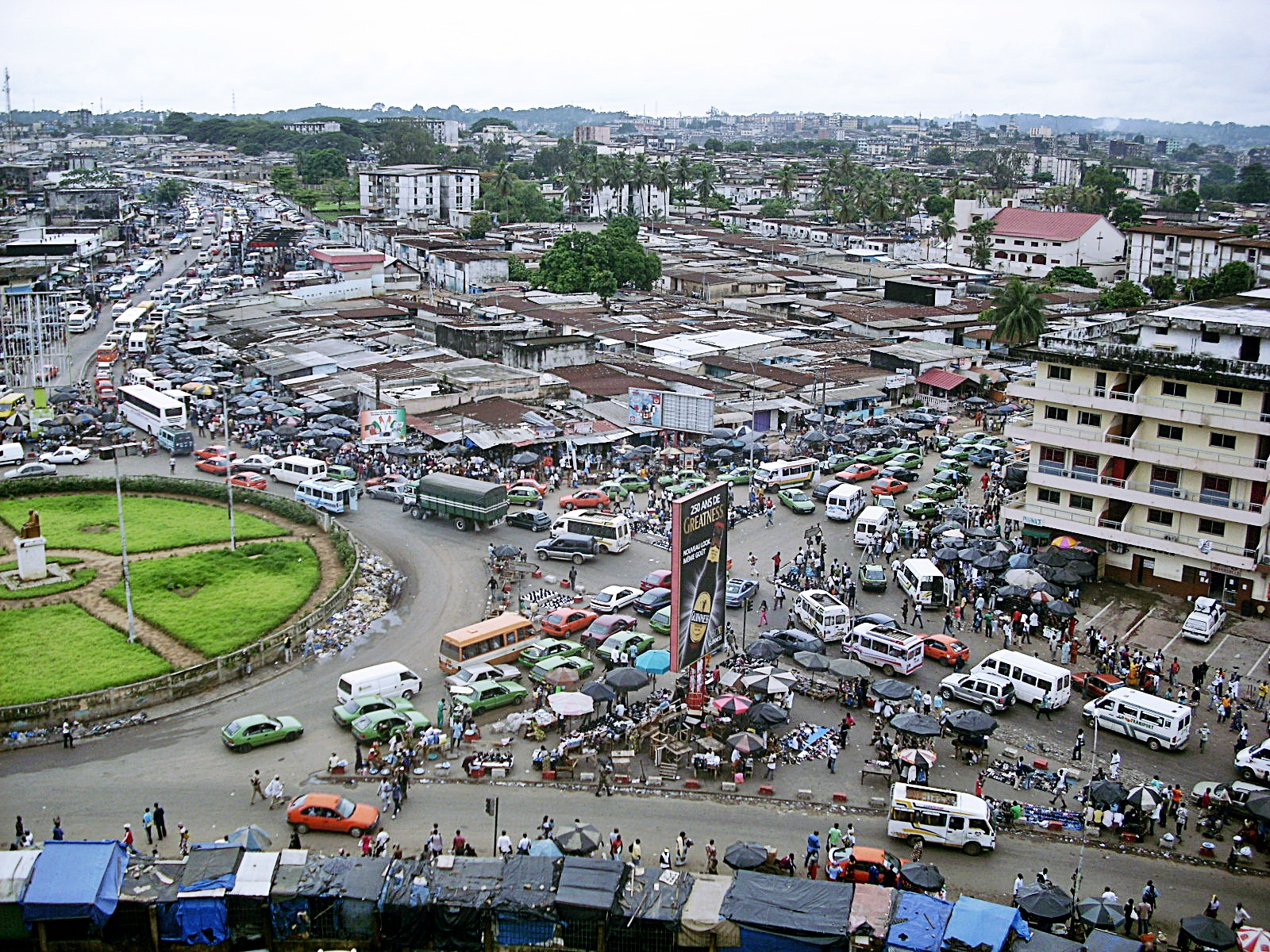
Liberté traffic circle, Adjamé, Abidjan, in 2010

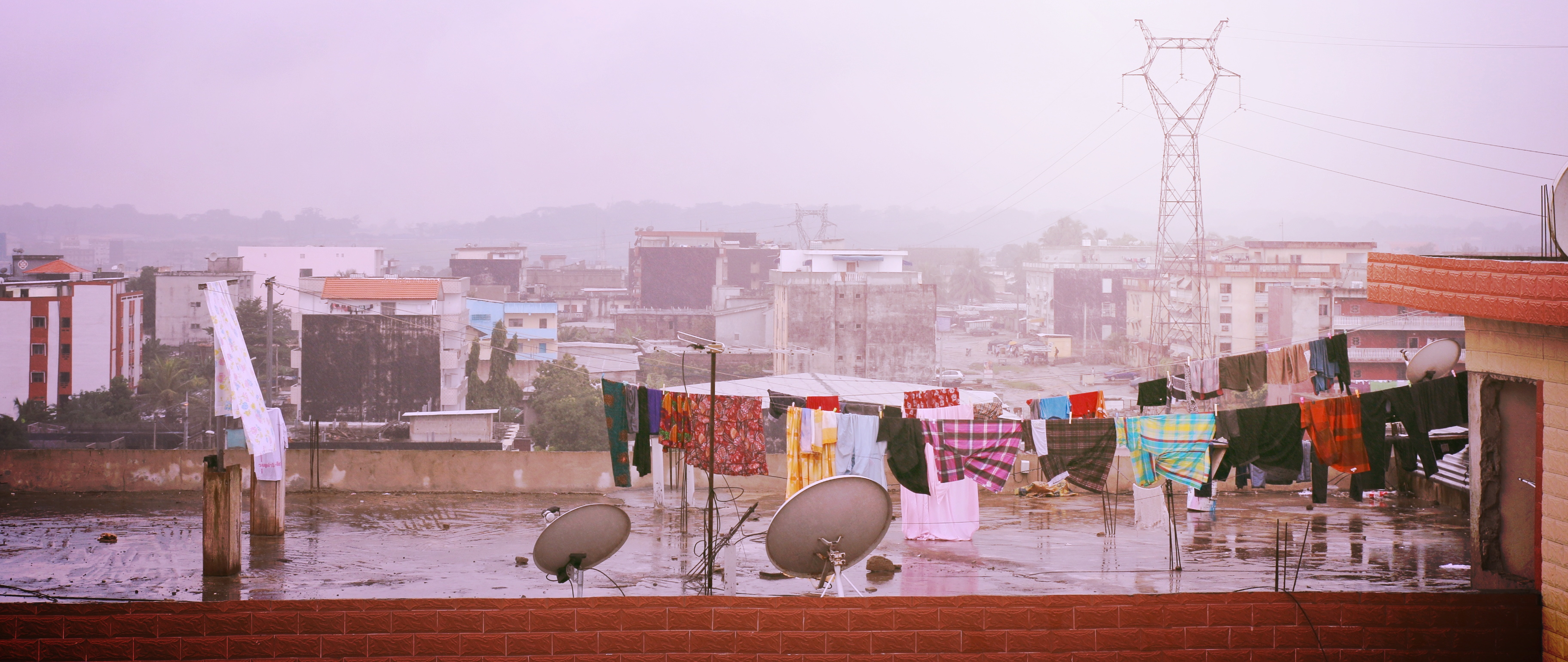
Abidjan, 2014
