= Mass media in Ivory Coast =

Mass media in Ivory Coast is controlled by the government. Audiovisual communications are regulated by the Conseil national de la communication audiovisuelle (CNCA), an administrative arm of the national government.

== Print ==
Newspapers include Fraternité Matin, Ivoir’Soir, Le Jour, and Notre Voie.

Côte d'Ivoire has several dozen daily, weekly and other periodicals that are published regularly. The government, or its supporters, also publish several magazines: Femme d'Afrique, Spécial Auto and Guido.

Other niche publications include: Top Visages (music articles, one of the top circulations (50,000), Gbich (humour articles, circulation of 40,000), Mimosas (sports), Mousso (women), and others. Most newspapers are in tabloid format.

== List of Ivory Coast journalists ==
- Freedom Neruda, named a World Press Freedom Hero of the International Press Institute
- Rommy Roméo Nahounou
- Didier Bléou
- Bamba Bakary
- Pascal Aka Brou
- Joseph Andjou
- Serge Bilé
- Tiburce Koffi
- Soumahoro Ahmed S.Félix
- Innocent Naki
- Roger Fulgence Kassy
- Mariam Coulibaly
- Fousseni Coulibaly
- Tonton Bouba
- Barthélémy Inabo
- Denise Likane
- Yves Zogbo Junior
- Christian Gbalou
- Kaboré Moussa
- Mireille Anti
- Honorine NIARE
- Habiba Dembélé
- Marcellin Govoeï
- Edwige Andree Gouria
- Yves G.
- Kouamé N'guessan Désiré
- Tony Adiatou
- Serge Pacome Abonga

== Radio and television ==
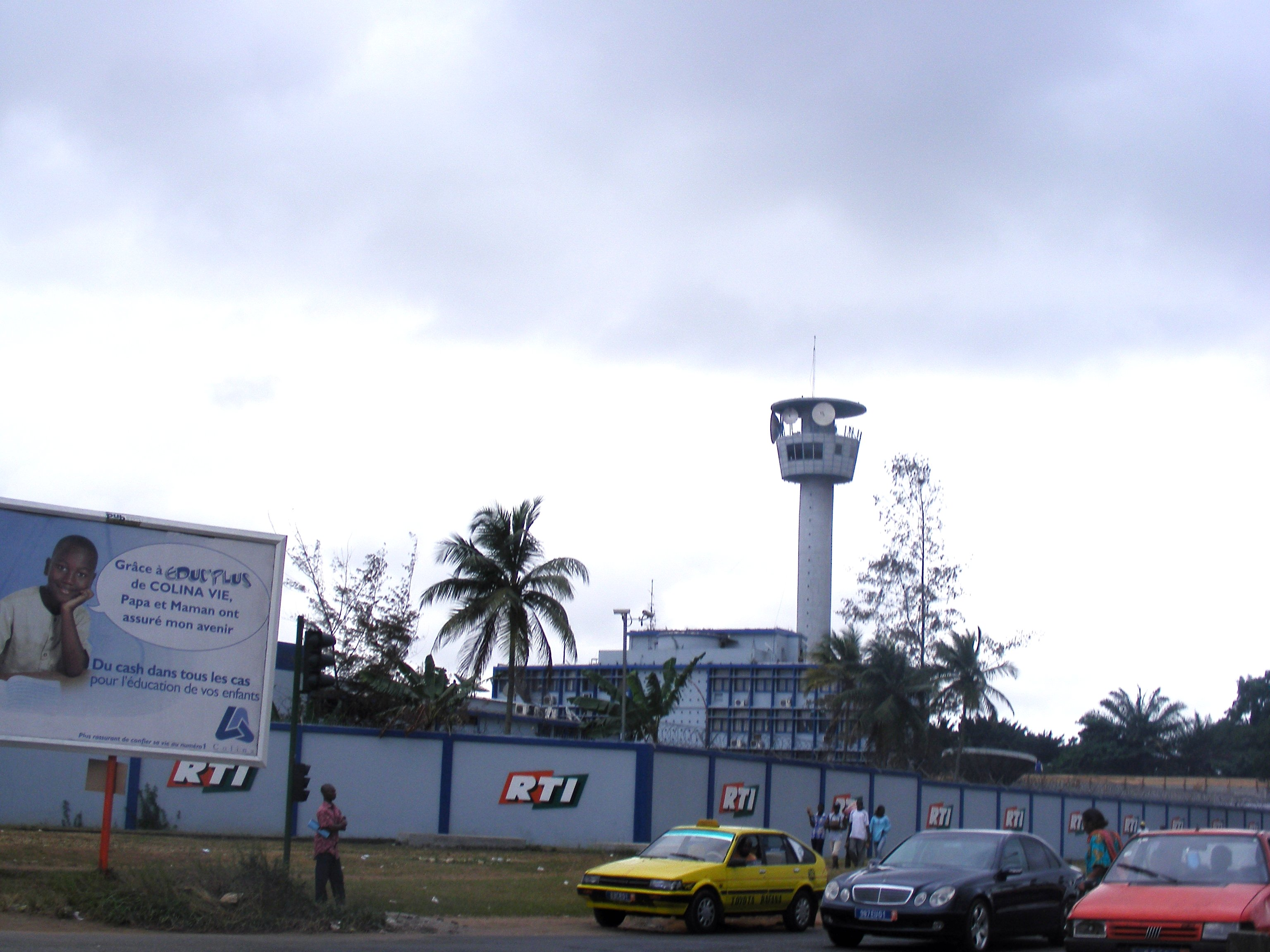
RTI tower in Abijdan, 2009

The state-controlled television broadcasting entity is Radiodiffusion Télévision Ivoirienne (RTI), which oversees two channels: La Première (RTI 1), which broadcasts nationally, and TV2 (RTI 2), which since its debut has broadcast exclusively to Abidjan and its surrounding region. They present respectively an average of 10 to 13 hours and 6 to 8 hours of daily programming each. RTI 1 focuses on news programming and discussion of government topics. RTI 2 targets a younger audience with its programming, focussing on entertainment.

Canal+ Afrique, formerly Canal+ Horizons, is the sole private television broadcaster to transmit on the hertz network in Abidjan, since its launch on January 21, 1994. This channel is a project of the French-owned Groupe Canal+, and targets a French-speaking African audience. Canal+ Horizons followed the same programming format as Canal+.

TV5MONDE, the French-owned international broadcaster that reaches countries throughout "la francophonie" (the French-speaking world), is offered to more subscribers than Canal+ Horizons, although it could be accessed directly like CFI-TV, another satellite station. Canal+ Vert is also available by subscription.

Television channels offered by the satellite service provider "Le Sat" (100,000 subscribers throughout), owned by the former Sofirad, can be picked up in Abidjan with MMDS antenna : TV5 Afrique, RTL9, Festival, TiJi, Mangas, MCM Africa (a subsidiary of MCM), Euronews, Planète, etc.

Some business promoters in the country have presented different projects aimed at privately owned television broadcasting to the (Conseil national de la communication audiovisuelle - CNCA). For example: Afric Channel, announced for January 2002, has yet to begin broadcasting. This proposed satellite channel, with a commercial orientation, is proposed by an Ivoirian businessman, Afric Channel, which would transmit from Milan, Italy, is intended to be aimed at a multidimensional audience: it would market itself to a West African market, the Ivory Coast in particular, and also the 8,215,000 Africans living in Europe.

=== List of national television stations ===
- Radiodiffusion Television Ivoirienne (RTI)
  - La Première
  - RTI 2
  - La 3
  - RTI Sport TV
  - RTI Music TV
- La Nouvelle Chaîne Ivoirienne (NCI)
- Télévision Ivory Coast (TCI)
- TV2
- TAM-TAM TV
- Africahit Music TV

=== Radio ===
Radiodiffusion Télévision Ivoirienne (RTI) also manages a network of two radio stations : Radio Côte d'Ivoire (covering the national territory) and Fréquence 2 (broadcast throughout the country, after initially only transmitting to the region of Abidjan. Radio stations transmit on FM and can be identified as belonging to one of three categories: stations of close proximity, commercial stations and foreign stations.

Stations of close proximity represent local interests and carry programming oriented towards community life, such as social, economic and cultural programs. These are located within a broadcasting area of 10 km. Since June 1998, stations began transmitting under a decree issued on September 13, 1995, that set down their rules of operation.

There are 52 radio stations of close proximity. They all broadcast under a license (26 licences are issued to communities and 26 to private individuals). These stations are banned from broadcasting any programming of a political nature or that includes branded advertising. Several exclusively broadcast Roman Catholic religious-related programming.

A dozen stations of close proximity broadcast in the capital Abidjian :

- Radio Yopougon (community radio)
- Radio ATM Port-Bouët (community radio)
- City FM (private license holder, Treichville)
- Radio Abidjan 1 (ex RFS) (private license holder, Cocody)
- Albayane FM
- Cocody FM (private license holder, Cocody)
- Radio Alobhé Bingerville, 100.8 FM (Radio Communale)
- Radio Espoir (religious non-commercial station)
- Zénith FM
- Radio Amitié
- Radio Anyama

Only two private radio license holders are authorized to broadcast commercial material:

- Radio Nostalgie, part of Nostalgie International, received in Abidjan
- JAM FM, authorized since March 1993, with the goal of beginning transmissions by the beginning of 2000.

The decree approving the convention for the operation of a public radio broadcasting service was signed by the Conseil des ministres April 24, 1996.

There are three foreign radio broadcasters that can be received in Ivory Coast on the FM band: RFI (Abidjan and Korhogo), Africa N°1 (Abidjan) and BBC (Abidjan). Voice of America (VOA) obtained a license in 2001 with a view to transmitting in FM in Abidjan.

== Freedom of speech ==
Though the constitution provides for free expression and a free press, the government imposes significant restrictions on print and electronic media. In 2011, the government replaced members of the National Press Council (CNP), which regulates the print media, with supporters of Laurent Gbagbo. Gbagbo's communication minister, Ouattara Gnonzié, told Radio France Internationale that “the end of tolerance was a self-defence measure” and that support for insurrection would be “punished harshly.” Arrests and beatings of journalists were regularly reported. The government also imposed censorship in 2011 by cancelling the broadcasting permit of the UN radio station, Onuci FM, operated by the United Nations peace-keeping mission in Ivory Coast (ONUCI). Transmitting equipment belonging to French-owned Canal+ was seized without the government notifying the company. Local retransmission of the French TV news channels TV5 and France 24 is meanwhile still suspended.

After Gbagbo's loss of power in May 2011, reprisals against pro-Gbagbo members of the media were reported. Ivory Coast

== See also ==
- Telecommunications in Ivory Coast
- List of newspapers in Ivory Coast
- Internet censorship and surveillance in Ivory Coast
- Press in Abidjan
- Cinema of Ivory Coast
- Ivorian comics
- Journalism
- Ivory Coast

== Bibliography ==
- Toyin Falola; Daniel Jean-Jacques, eds. (2015). "Côte d'Ivoire: Media". Africa: an Encyclopedia of Culture and Society. ABC-CLIO. p. 356. ISBN 978-1-59884-666-9.
- "Côte d'Ivoire", Freedom of the Press, USA: Freedom House, 2016, OCLC 57509361
