= Television in Ivory Coast =

Television has been present in the Ivory Coast since 1963. As of 2026, there are nine terrestrial television channels (three public and six private) as well as subscription platforms.

== History ==
The Ivory Coast was one of the first countries in Sub-Saharan Africa and Françafrique to introduce television (in 1963), under the state broadcaster Radio Télévision Ivoirienne (RTI). The passage of Law nº62-402 on 31 October 1962 led to the founding of RTI with the aim of creating a television service. Said service launched on 7 August 1963. In December 1963, a second transmitter opened in Dotenzia, Bouaké, by 1965 both transmitters covered a third of the country; then it opened two studios in Cocody to expand its schedule; followed by a new transmitter in Dabakala in 1968. Color television broadcasts began in 1973. Most technical support in its early years was done by OCORA, an ORTF subsidiary that assisted broadcasters in former French colonies. From 1971 to April 1981, RTI also aired an educational service; this closed due to budget concerns.

In November 1983, RTI launched Canal 2 (renamed TV2 in 1991), only covering Abidjan and adjacent areas. In this phase, it only broadcast on Tuesdays and Fridays from 8:30pm. On 1 November 1991, upon its rename to TV2, daily broadcasts began. Both RTI channels were TVAfrica affiliates; La Première was a sports affiliate while TV2 aired all of its programming.

In 2002, the RTI 1 transmitter in Bouaké was used to carry TV Notre Patrie illegally during part of the day's schedule, usually after the RTI newscast. By 2008, there was an independent satellite channel operating, Ivoire Canal International (ICI TV, "ICI" also refers to "here"), the channel also relayed telenovelas seen on RTI 1. During 2011, there was also an opposition channel during the crisis, Télé Côte d'Ivoire. After the war ended later that year, RTI 1 resumed full broadcasts.

In May 2016, the High Authority for Audiovisual Communication issued tenders for the first private television stations, which would begin with the digital terrestrial platform. Said platform opened on 8 February 2019. The first true private channel that appeared (other than the rebel-backed TVNP in the 2000s in Bouaké) was NCI on 12 December 2019. Still in 2019, the SES-4 satellite was granted to distribute RTI's signals nationwide, as well as a maximum amount of 60 channels for the digital terrestrial service.
