= List of newspapers in Ivory Coast =

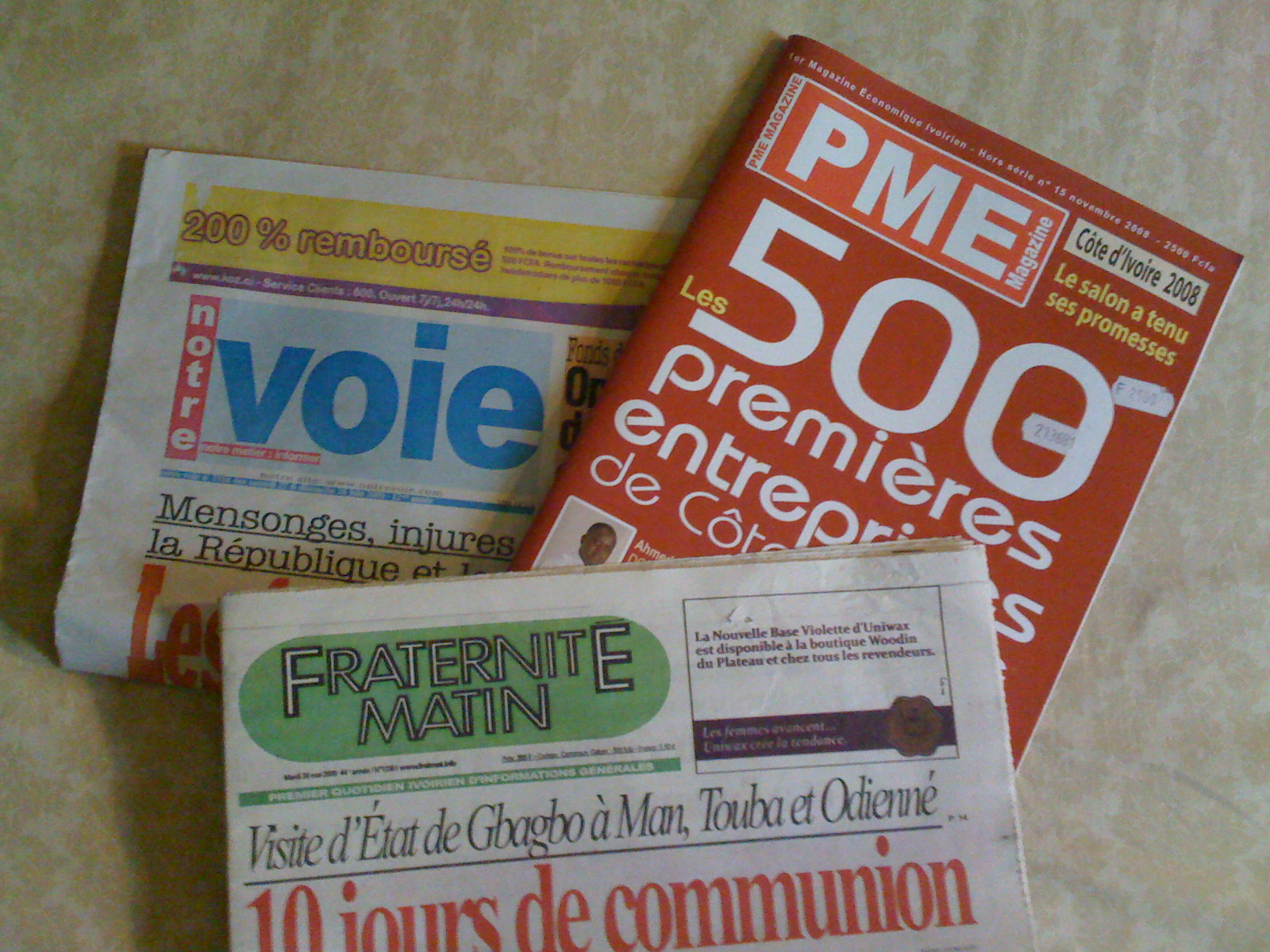
Assorted Ivory Coast news publications, 2009

This is a list of newspapers in Ivory Coast.

== List of newspapers ==
Newspaper	Location	First issued	Publisher	Website	Notes
Actuel	Abidjan				
L'Aurore	Abidjan				
La Bombe	Abidjan				
Le Démocrate	Abidjan				
Douze	Abidjan				
Fraternité Matin	Abidjan	1964			
Le Front	Abidjan				
Gbich	Abidjan			Website	
L'Inter	Abidjan				
Le JD	Abidjan				
Le Jour	Abidjan				
Le Liberal	Abidjan				
Le National	Abidjan				
Notre Chance	Abidjan				
Notre Voie		1991		Website	
Le Nouveau Réveil	Abidjan				
Le Patriote	Abidjan				
Le Populaire	Abidjan				
Soir Info	Abidjan				
Tassouman	Abidjan				
La Voie	Abidjan				
Zaouli	Abidjan				
Le Temps	Abidjan				
Générations Nouvelles	Abidjan				
L'Essor	Abidjan				
L'Expression	Abidjan				

== See also ==
- List of newspapers in Ivory Coast (in French)
- Media of Ivory Coast
- List of radio stations in Africa: Côte d'Ivoire (fr)
- Press in Abidjan
- Telecommunications in Ivory Coast

== Bibliography ==
- William A. Hachten (1967). "Press in a One-Party State: The Ivory Coast under Houphouet". Journalism & Mass Communication Quarterly. 44: 107–114. doi:10.1177/107769906704400114. S2CID 144431209.
- W. Joseph Campbell (1998). Emergent Independent Press in Benin and Côte D'Ivoire. Praeger Publishers. ISBN 978-0-275-96309-5.
