= Adjamé =

- Suburb and urban commune
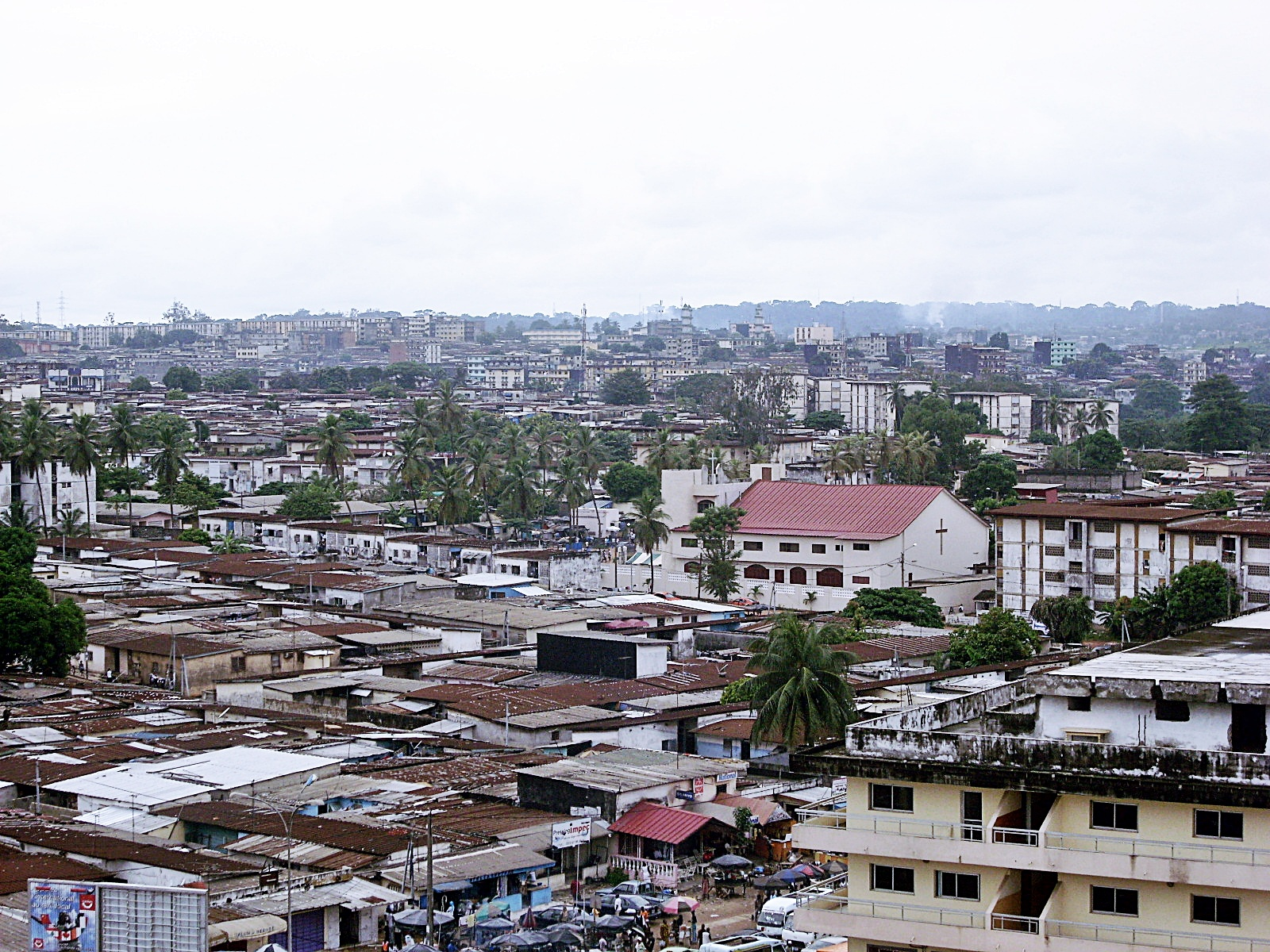
- Adjamé, 2010

- Location in Abidjan

- Location in Ivory Coast
- Coordinates: 5°21′N 4°2′W
- Country: Ivory Coast
- District: Abidjan

Area
  - Total: 11.66 km^{2} (4.50 sq mi)

Population (2021 census)
  - Total: 340,892
  - Density: 29,240/km^{2} (75,720/sq mi)
- Time zone: UTC+0 (GMT)

Adjamé is one of the 10 urban communes of Abidjan, Ivory Coast. It forms part of the metropolitan area and autonomous district of Abidjan.

The name Adjamé means "a junction" or "the centre" in the local Tchaman language. The Tchaman people of Adjamé are called Agbou Djemian and come under Chief Nanguy Abrogoua. Adjamé is located to the north of Plateau, Abidjan. Adjamé has the most important bus station in the country from where buses serve all of Ivory Coast as well as neighbouring countries.

== Sport ==
Adjamé is represented in football by the Stella Club of Adjamé which plays in the MTN Ligue 1 on the grounds of the Municipal Stadium. As in most parts of Ivory Coast, the club is organised in an informal way with football teams of seven players. The players are called Maracanas. Another club is AS Athlétic d'Adjamé.

Basile Boli, the French footballer (45 caps, one goal), was born in Adjamé.

== Government ==
List of mayors
Date elected	Name	Party
1970	Joseph Attoumbré	PDCI-RDA
1980	Jean Benjamin Amoa	PDCI-RDA
1985	Lassina Dembélé	PDCI-RDA
1996	Pierre Djédji Amondji	Ivorian Popular Front
2013	Youssouf Sylla	Rally of the Republicans

== Images ==
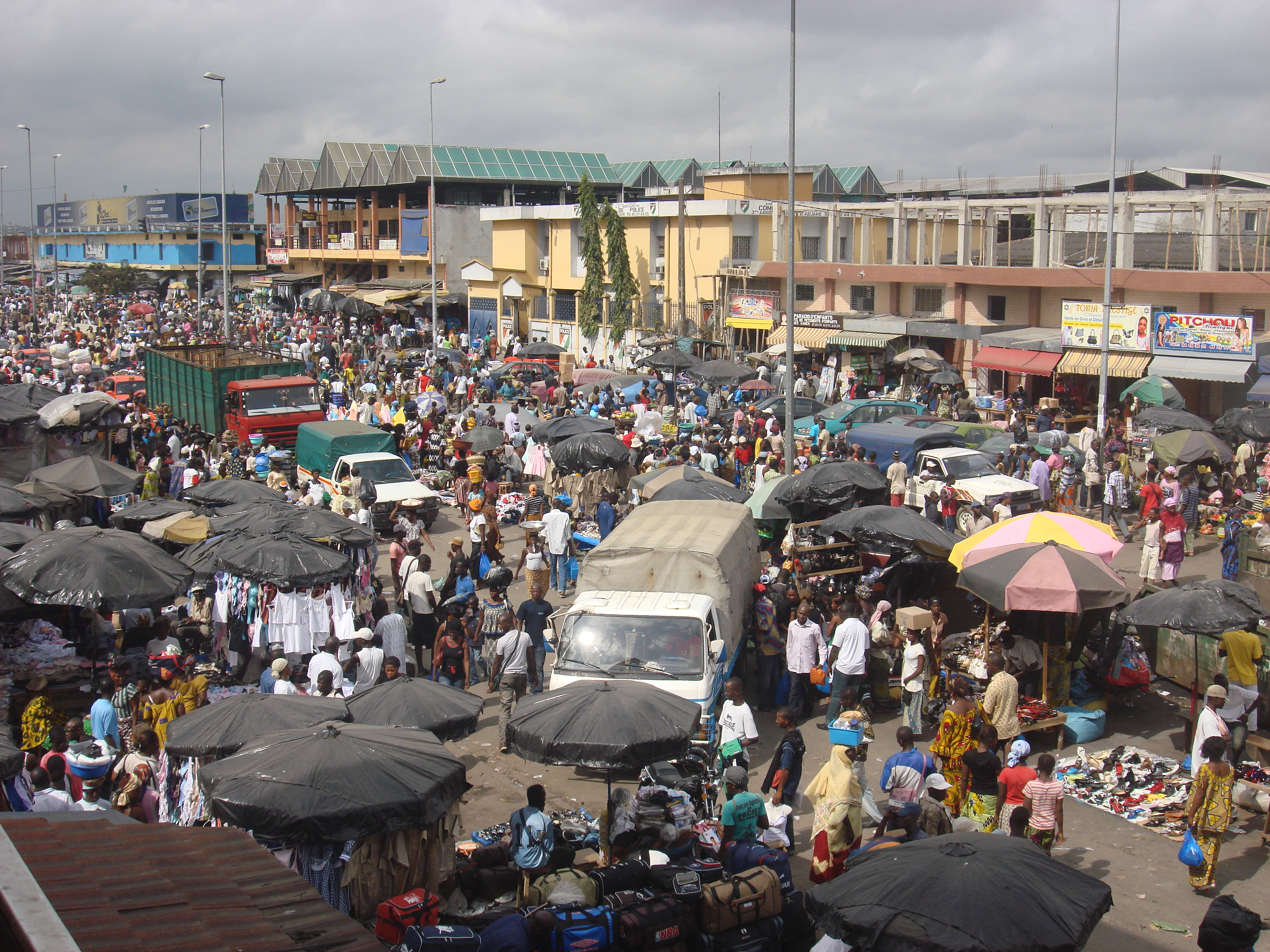
Market, 2008

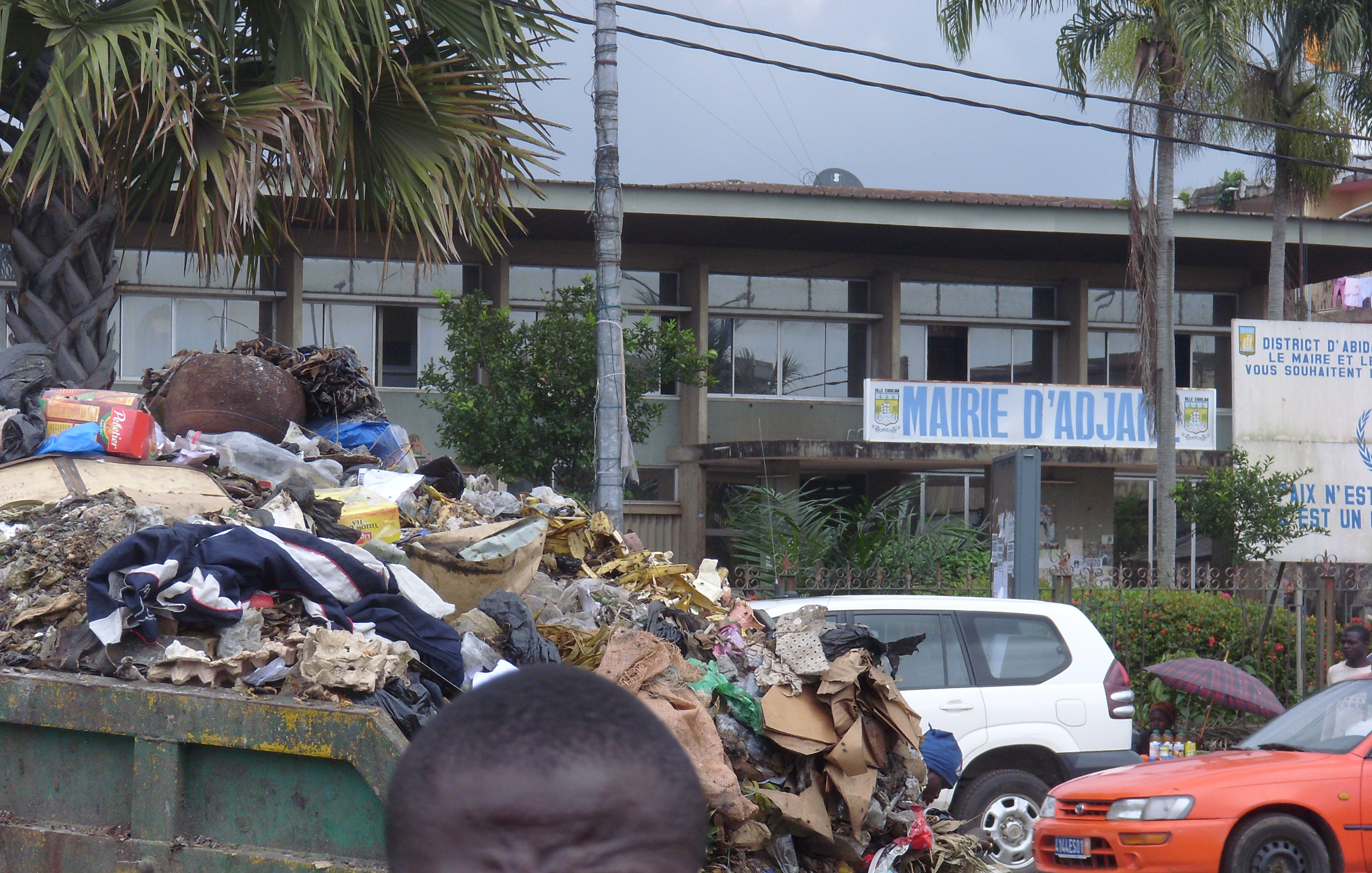

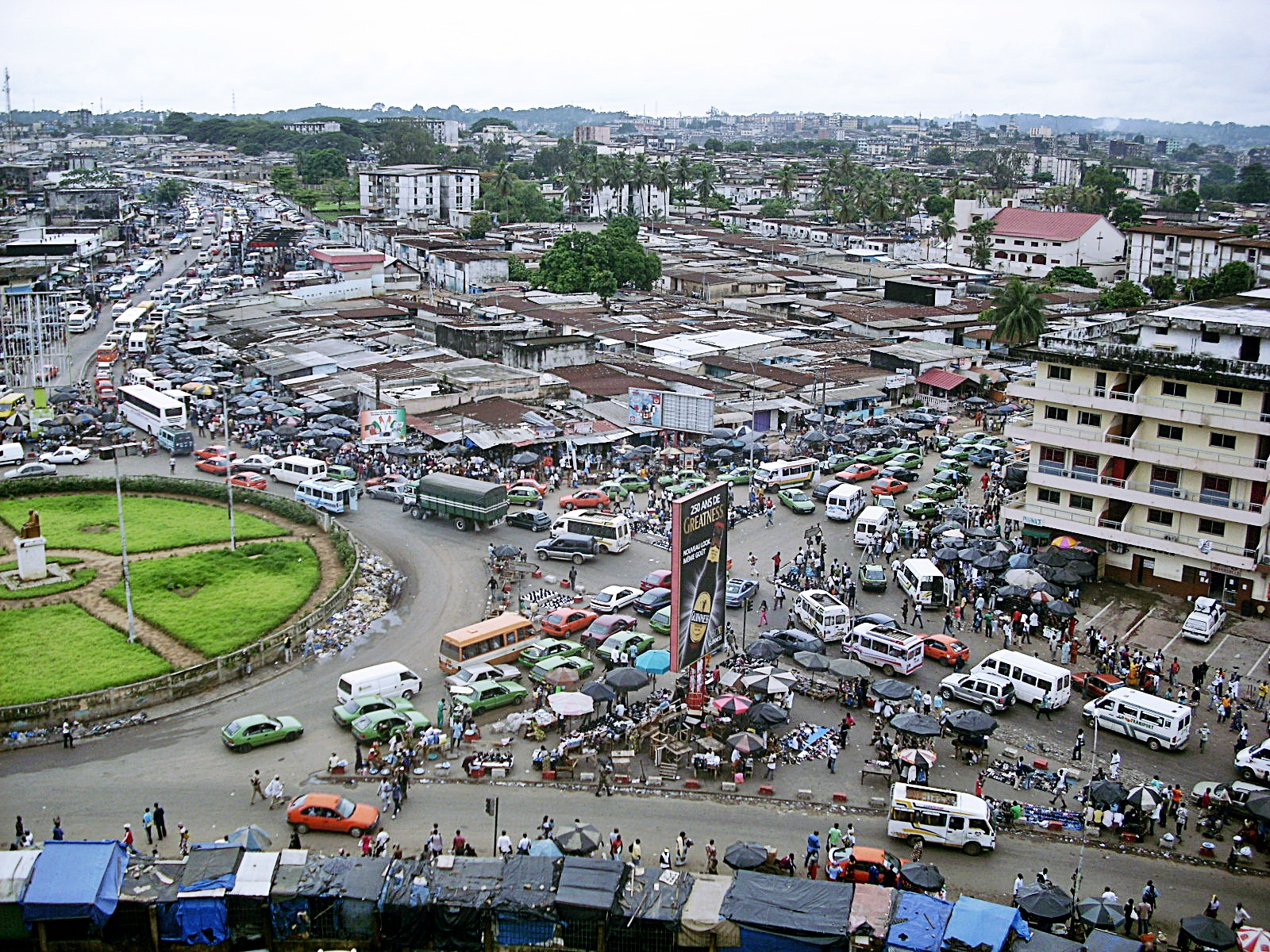
Liberté roundabout, 2010

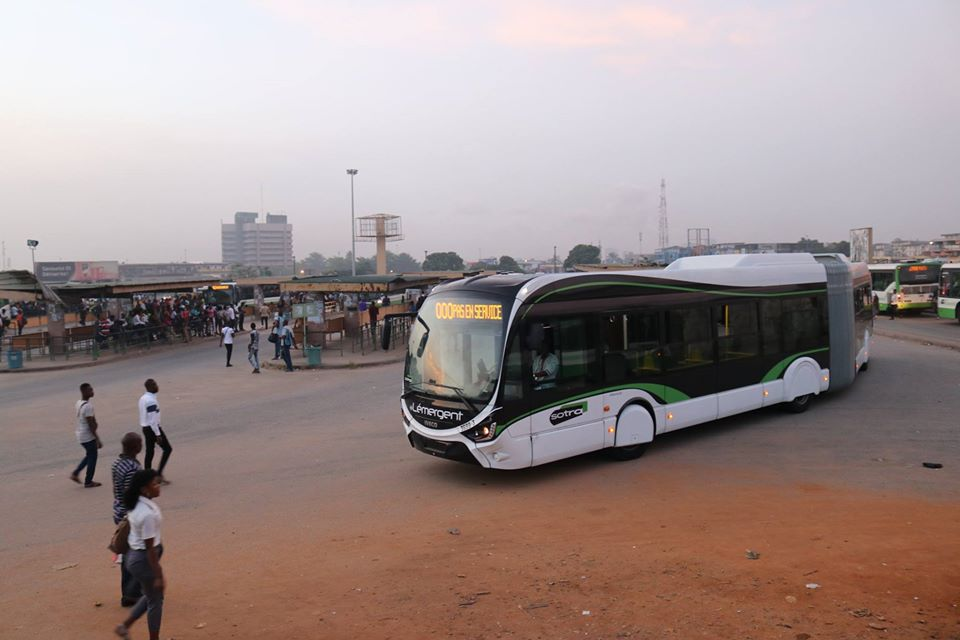
Bus station
