= Kraidy =

Kraidy is a surname. Notable people with the surname include:

- Agnès Kraidy (born 1965), Ivorian magazine editor and journalist
- Marwan M. Kraidy (fl. early 21st century), American academic administrator
