= List of tallest buildings in Abidjan =

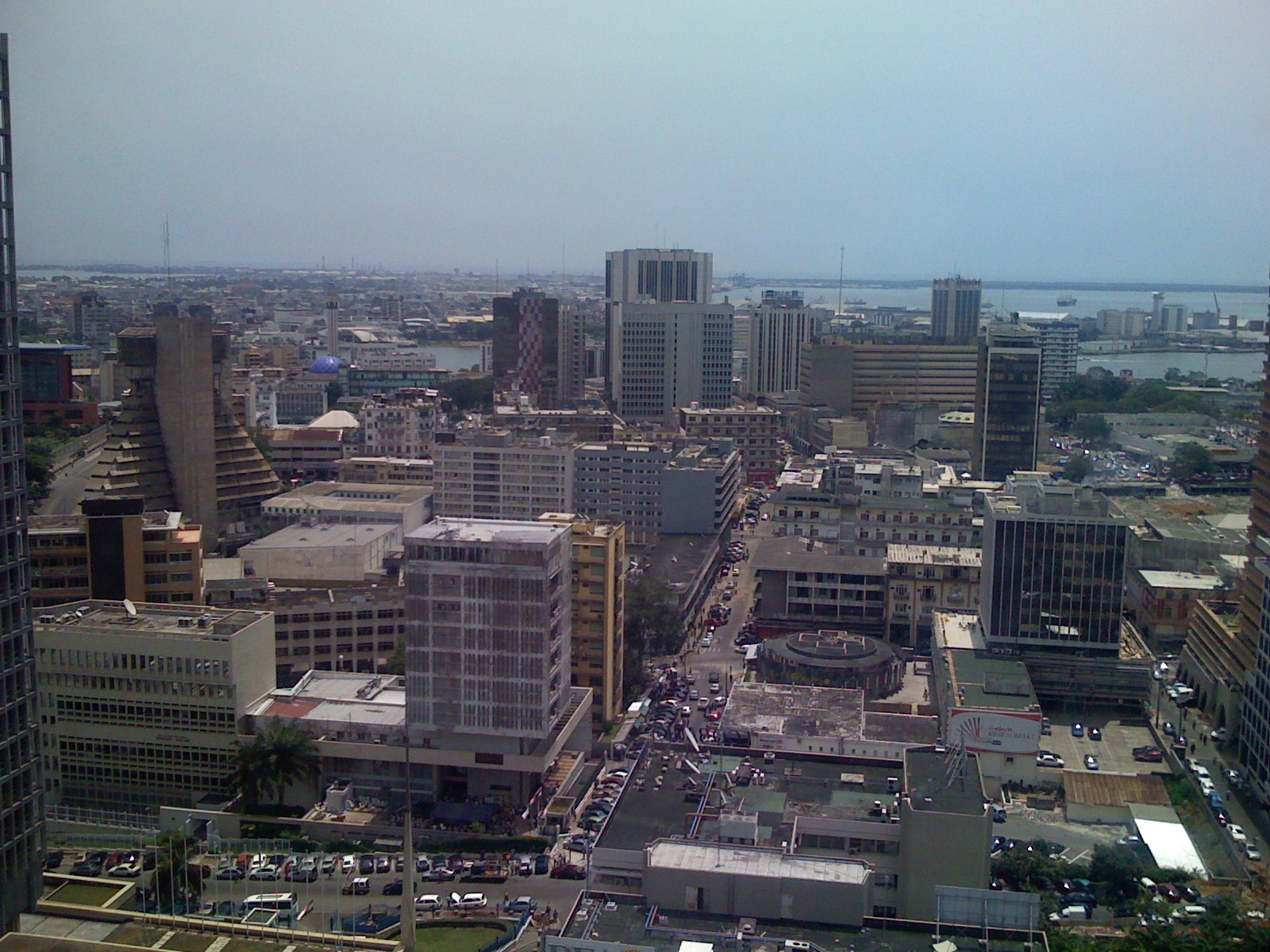
Abidjan has a developed skyline.

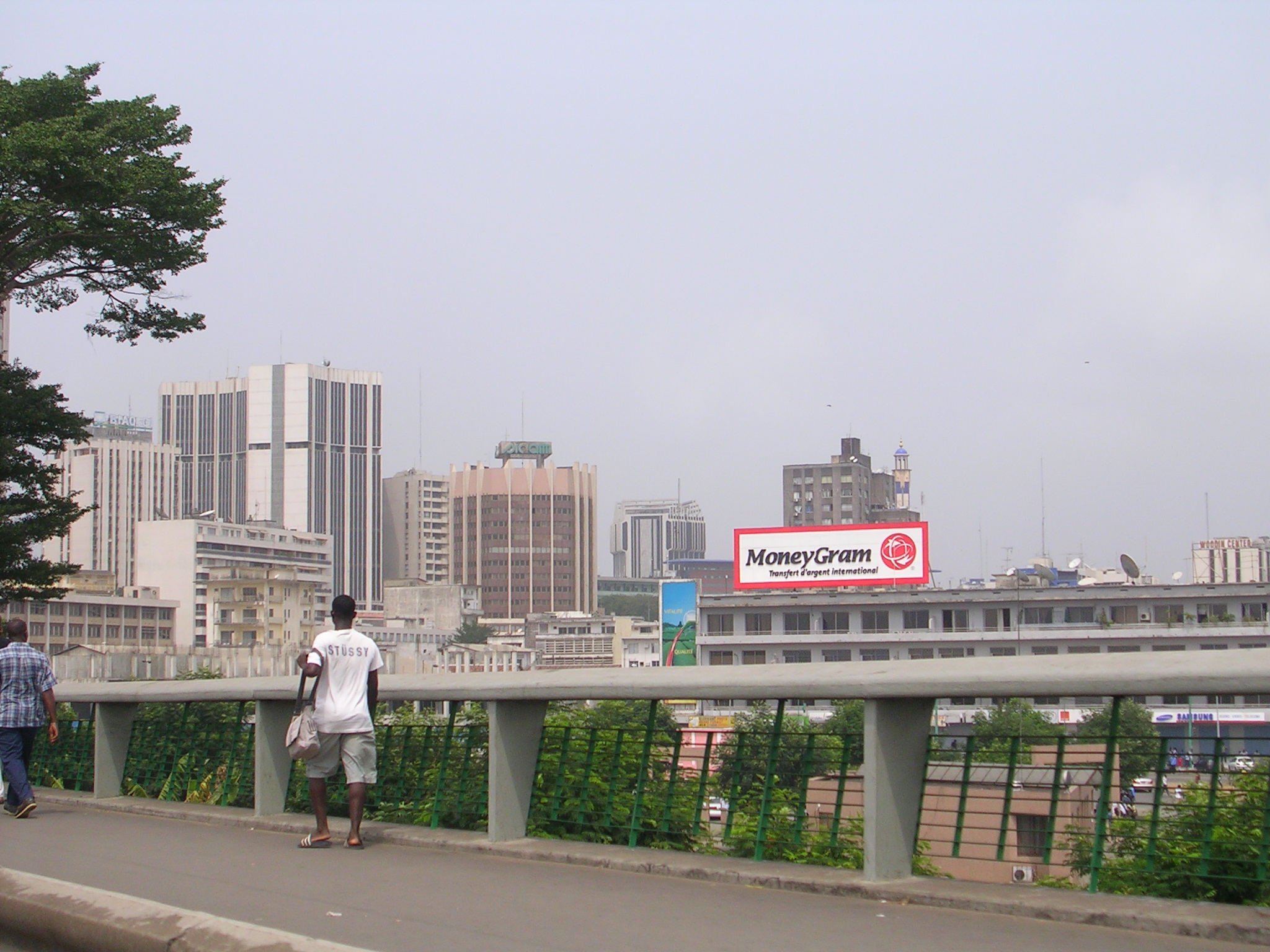
Abidjan Central Business District.

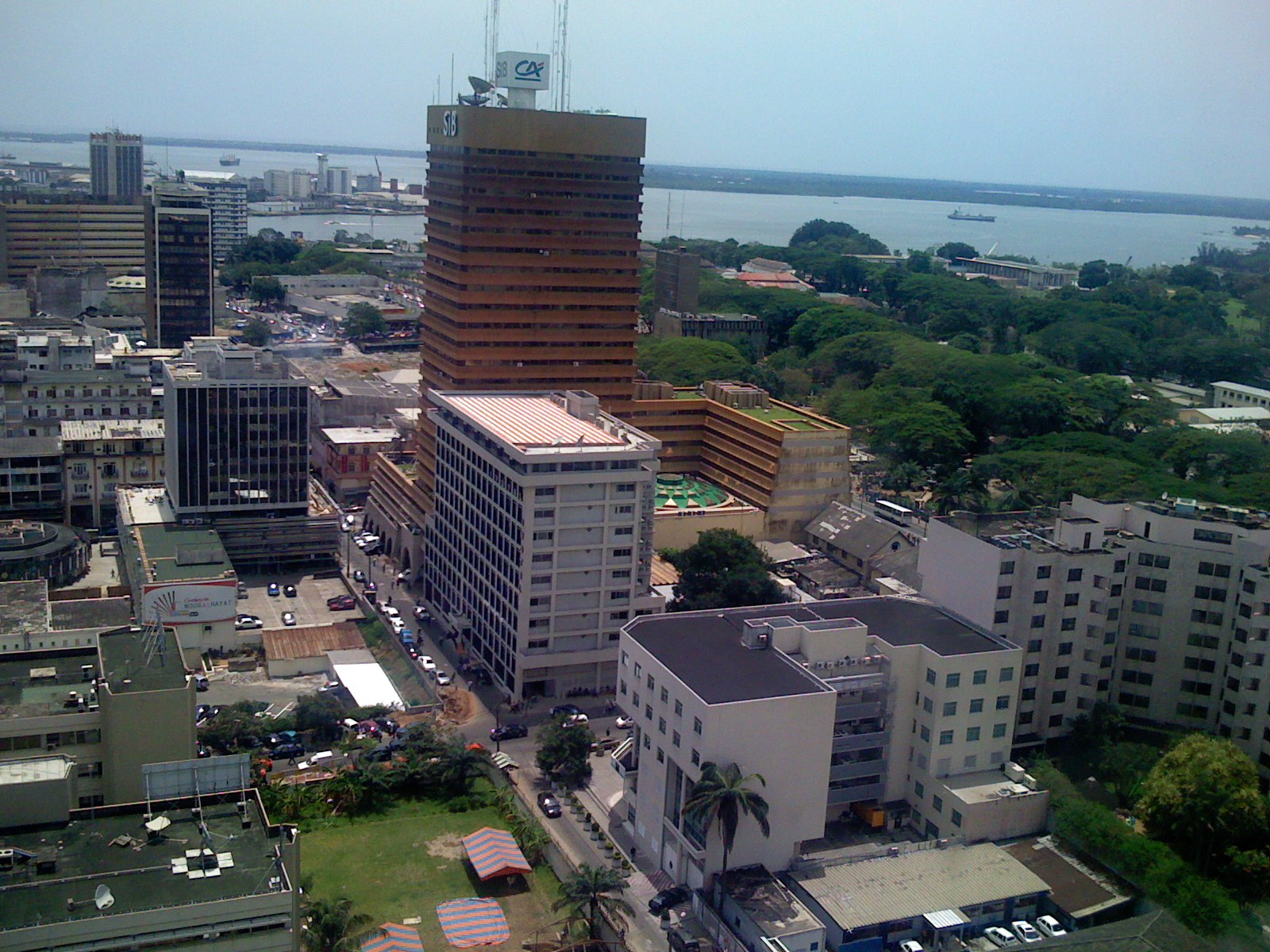
A tower in downtown Abidjan.

Tour CAISTAB

Abidjan is the largest city in Ivory Coast. In Abidjan, there are 10 buildings that stand taller than 85 m (279 ft). The tallest building in the city is the 30-storey, 120 m (394 ft) La Cité Administrative Tour D. The second-tallest building in the city is the Tour Postel 2001, standing at 106 m (348 ft) tall with 26 storeys.

Abidjan's history of skyscrapers began with the Ivoire InterContinental Abidjan Hotel Tower I (1969), La Pyramide Building (1973), and Immeuble SCIAM in 1975. Buildings in the city remained relatively short in the city until the late 1960s when the city experienced its first skyscraper boom. From 1969 to 1977, Abidjan witnessed a major expansion of skyscraper and high-rise construction. Many of the city's office towers were completed during this period, such as the Immeuble SIB. A near short lull in building construction came after this expansion, with a second, larger boom starting in 1982. Though this expansion was much shorter, lasting only two years, most of the city's iconic buildings were constructed during this time, including La Cité Administrative Tour D, the city's tallest building.

As of 2011, Abidjan had 190 completed high-rise buildings.

== Buildings ==
This list ranks Abidjan high-rises that stand at least 90 m (295 ft) tall, based on standard height measurement. This includes spires and architectural details but does not include antenna masts.

Was the tallest building in Abidjan upon completion

Buildings completed as of February, 2011
1	La Cité Administrative Tour D (Office)	120 m (390 ft)	30	1984
2	Tour Postel 2001 (Office)	106 m (348 ft)	26	1984
3	Ministry of Agriculture (Office)	109 m (358 ft)	25	1984
4	Ivoire InterContinental Abidjan Hotel Tower I (Hotel)	105 m (344 ft)	24	1969
5	Immeuble CAISTAB (Office)	105 m (344 ft)	25	1984
6	La Cité Administrative Tour E (Office)	100 m (330 ft)	24	1984
7	La Cité Administrative Tour C (Office)	100 m (330 ft)	24	1984
8	Immeuble SIB (Office)	96 m (315 ft)	23	1976
9	Immeuble Verdier (Office)	95 m (312 ft)	23	1976
10	Immeuble CCIA (Office)	93 m (305 ft)	28	1982
11	Residence Atta (Residential)	90 m (300 ft)	24	??
12	Tour First (Office)		13	??

== Under Construction ==
Rank	Building	Height	Floors	Completed
1	Tour F	421 metres (1,381 ft)	75	2026

== See also ==
- List of tallest buildings and structures in South Africa
- List of tallest structures in the world by country
- List of tallest buildings in Nigeria
- List of tallest buildings in Egypt
- List of tallest buildings in Africa
- List of tallest buildings in Nairobi
