= Agnès Kraidy =

Ivorian magazine editor and journalist

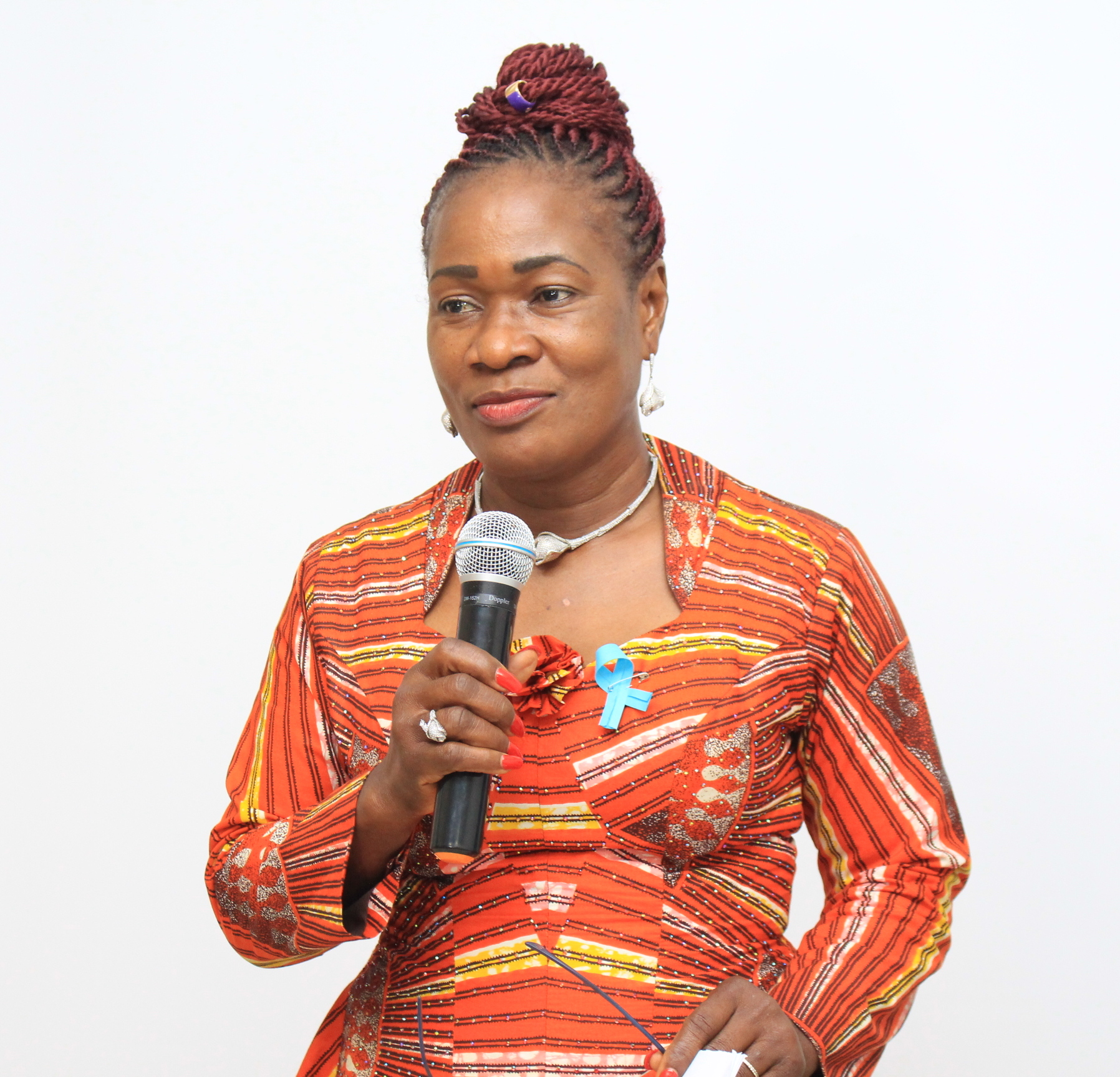
- Born: 10 February 1965 (age 60)
- Citizenship: Ivory Coast
- Occupations: Journalist; magazine editor
- Employers: newspaper Fraternité Matin; women's magazine Femme d'Afrique
- Notable work: chroniques d'une guerre vaincue; Une journaliste et un prêtre en dialogue sur l'Afrique; Tu me fous les boules ! Vaincre le cancer!

Agnès Kraidy (born February 10, 1965) is an Ivorian magazine editor and journalist. Since April 2014, she has been the President of the Network of Women Journalists and Communication in Ivory Coast.

== Biography ==
In 1989, Kraidy was the first woman to join the editing staff of the Ivorian newspaper Fraternité Matin. Now the paper's editor-in-chief, she is also editor of the women's magazine Femme d'Afrique. She has interviewed several celebrities on television, including presidents Laurent Gbagbo and Alassane Ouattara and Prime Minister Guillaume Soro. Keen to improve the role of women in her country, in 2013 Kraidy provided details to the World Bank on the practical problems women were subjected to. This led to the report "Etre femme en Cote d'Ivoire : quelles strategies d'autonomisation?" (Being a woman in Cote d'Ivoire : empowerment challenges).

In 2004, Kraidy published her first book 19 septembre : chroniques d'une guerre vaincue, consisting of ten patriotic editorials written between 2002 and 2004 on the First Ivorian Civil War. Later publications include Une journaliste et un prêtre en dialogue sur l'Afrique (2012) and Tu me fous les boules ! Vaincre le cancer! in 2016, on fighting breast cancer.

On 8 March 2021, in connection with International Women's Day, a ceremony in honour of Agnès Kraidy was organized by the Maison du textile which selects a deserving woman each year. She was presented with a cheque for 3.5 million francs which would help her to support the Femmes dynamiques de Bonoua, an association in which she has been involved. She expressed her own feelings about feminism stating: "Being a woman means fighting for ensuring femininity and not trying to become a man."
