= NCI (TV channel) =

- Country: Côte d'Ivoire

Programming
- Language: French

Ownership
- Owner: Société Grands Médias

History
- Launched: 12 December 2019; 6 years ago

Links
- Website: www.nci.ci

NCI (Nouvelle Chaîne Ivoirienne, New Ivorian Channel) is an Ivorian private television channel and the first of its kind. It is available nationwide on digital terrestrial television and cable, on satellite in Africa and online around the world.

== History ==
In 2016, after over half a century when RTI had a television monopoly, four private television channels were authorized to operate in the Ivory Coast. These were selected following a call for tenders launched in May 2016 by the High Authority for Audiovisual Communication in the context of the liberalization of the country's audiovisual landscape. The launch of these channels, expected to come with the arrival of digital terrestrial television, has continued to be postponed, due to numerous problems encountered in setting up the platform.

Digital terrestrial broadcasts finally began on 8 February 2019, in Abidjan. The channel, however, did not launch until 12 December 2019, at 6:45pm. with the first edition of La Télé d'Ici presented by Cheikh Yvhane.

NCI's director-general is Ange Guéï. The channel's success as of November 2021 owed to its programming; by then it was the most popular channel in the Ivory Coast and the local channel that had the most users liking its Facebook page (1,5 million).

On 5 November 2022, NCI obtained the rights to the 2022 FIFA World Cup from Togolese company New World TV. Up until then, the World Cup was broadcast on RTI's channels.
