= Noel Yobou =

Ivorian footballer (born 1982)

Personal information
- Full name: Noel Mobio Yobou Agbo
- Date of birth: 5 January 1982 (age 44)
- Place of birth: Attécoubé, Ivory Coast
- Position: Goalkeeper

Youth career
- Stella Club d'Adjamé

Senior career*
Years	Team	Apps	(Gls)
2002–2006	Stella Club d'Adjamé		
2006–2007	Thanda Royal Zulu		
2007–2008	Western Province United		
2008–2009	FC Cape Town	0	(0)
2010–?	Platinum Stars		

International career
2004	Ivory Coast U23		
- * Club domestic league appearances and goals

Noel Mobio Yobou Agbo (born 5 January 1982) is an Ivorian former professional footballer who played as goalkeeper.

== Club career ==
Yobou was born in Attécoubé. He began his career with Stella Club d'Adjamé, was promoted in 2002, before transferred to Thanda Royal Zulu in 2006.

Having previously played for Benoni Premier United Yobou joined National First Division side FC Cape Town, four months after declaring that he had quit relegated Western Province United. He later signed a two and half year deal with the Tycoons from the North-West Province Platinum Stars.

He retired from playing in 2015.

== International career ==
Yobou presented the Under 23 from The Elephants at Football at the 2004 Summer Olympics Qualify and was the captain.

== See also ==
- Football in Ivory Coast
- List of football clubs in Ivory Coast
