= CCIA Building =

Building in Ivory Coast

Abidjan International Trade Centre
- Interactive map of the Abidjan International Trade Centre area

General information
- Type: Office
- Architectural style: Modernist
- Location: rue Jean-Paul II, Le Plateau, Abidjan, Côte d'Ivoire
- Coordinates: 5.331382°N 4.022072°W
- Completed: 1982
- Renovated: September 2012-September 2013
- Owner: SOGEPIE

Height
- Antenna spire: 115.63 m (379.4 ft)
- Roof: 94 m (308 ft)

Technical details
- Floor count: 28
- Floor area: 12,000 m^{2} (130,000 sq ft)
- Lifts/elevators: 8

The CCIA Building, (long form Abidjan International Trade Center Building), is a skyscraper located on Rue Jean-Paul II, in the Plateau community of Abidjan, Côte d'Ivoire. Built in 1982 and topping out at 94 metres (308 ft) tall, it is the fourth-tallest building in Abidjan. It is part of a group of buildings planned in the 1970s and intended for use as offices and headquarters for publicly traded companies. Its architecture differs from other buildings in the neighborhood, with two long faces almost exclusively covered in tinted windows that reflect colors in the sky.

Built on an area of 12,000 m^{2} (130,000 sq ft), the building is made up of 28 floors, of which 26 floors of offices, three floors below ground, a 650 space parking garage, and a 350-seat auditorium.

The building was constructed with the goal of uniting all the export promotion organizations in Côte d'Ivoire, replacing the Ivorian Center for Foreign Trade. It made it easier for the organizations to coordinate and prioritize their activities. The CCIA, partnered with the "World Trade Center" movement. It received additional support form the United Nations, strictly linked to institutional restructuring, development of local small and medium-sized enterprises and global promotion of Ivorian products (participation in international exhibitions, searching for new markets, improvement and adaptation of products. and their packaging). The construction was financed by the United Nations Development Programme and supervised by the International Trade Centre between 1985 and 1991, under the authority of then-Minister of Commerce, Nicolas Kouandi-Angba.

The building was severely damaged during the 2010-2011 Ivorian crisis, but had been in a state of disrepair for nearly a decade prior following financial mismanagement on the part of SIEGIM-CI, owners of the building in the 2000s. The building was renovated between September 2012 and October 2013, in order to welcome the provisional headquarters of the African Development Bank, which had previously been housed in the Ministry of Commerce.
