= Mariam Coulibaly (television presenter) =

Ivorian journalist (born 1977)

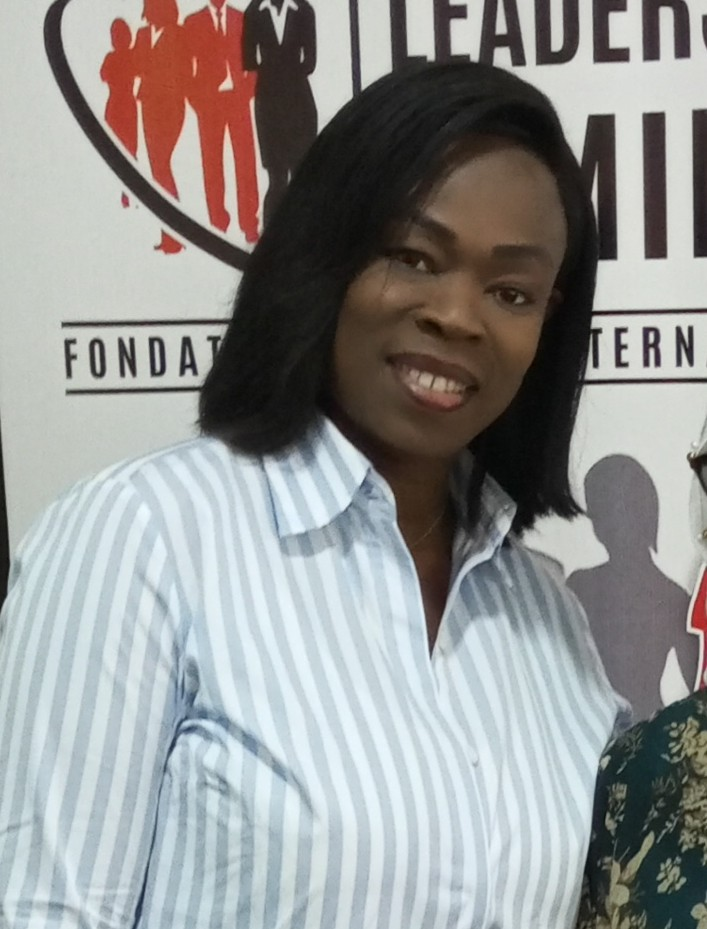
- Born: 1977 (age 48–49)
- Citizenship: Ivory Coast
- Education: University of Abidjan
- Occupation: Television presenter

Mariam Coulibaly (born July 27, 1977), known by the nickname Mam Coul, is an Ivorian radio and television presenter. In 2025, she was appointed director of the broadcaster RTI 2.

== Biography ==
Mariam Coulibaly was born in Ivory Coast in 1977, and she grew up in Gagnoa. Her mother, a local politician, was from the country's Southwest, while her father, a sports coach, was from the North. As a high school student in Gagnoa, she became involved in extracurricular activities that led her to discover an interest in radio broadcasting. After graduating in 1996, she enrolled in the law department at the University of Abidjan, where she obtained a degree in legal sciences.

While still a student, in 1997, she began working as a radio presenter for the station Fromager Tropique FM. After graduation, she was hired at Radio Yopougon, then moved to City FM in Treichville.

In March 2000, Coulibaly participated in Radio Télévision Ivoirienne's (RTI) recruitment test for presenters, and she was hired. After a year, she was moved to RTI 2 to host "Le club de la RTI 2." In 2013, she was assigned to host the international production "INTERVILLES Côte d'Ivoire" for RTI 1.

She was named director of the radio station Fréquence 2 in 2016. In 2025, she was appointed director of the channel RTI 2.

Coulibaly is affectionately known as "Mam Coul" among her fans.

== Programs ==
- 2000–2005 : "Panache" (RTI 2)
- 2001: "Le Club de la RTI 2" (RTI 2)
- 2013: "INTERVILLES Côte d'Ivoire" (RTI 1)
