= Attécoubé =

Attécoubé Abidjan Te
- Suburb and urban commune
- Location in Abidjan

- Location in Ivory Coast
- Coordinates: 5°20′N 4°2′W
- Country: Ivory Coast
- District: Abidjan

Area
  - Total: 46.17 km^{2} (17.83 sq mi)

Population (2021 census)
  - Total: 313,135
  - Density: 6,782/km^{2} (17,570/sq mi)
- Time zone: UTC+0 (GMT)

Attécoubé (Ebrié: Abidjan Te) is a suburb of and one of the 10 urban communes of Abidjan, Ivory Coast. It is situated to the northwest of Abidjan's central Plateau commune, overlooking the Baie du Banco. Attécoubé has a total area of 46.17 square kilometres (17.83 sq mi), 30 square kilometres (12 sq mi) of which is covered by forest and 5 square kilometres (1.9 sq mi) by Ébrié Lagoon. The commune forms part of Banco National Park.

The population was 164,751 in 1988, 214,638 in 1998, and 260,911 in 2014. At the beginning of the colonial era, Attécoubé was exploited by the French for its timber. Its mayor, elected in municipal elections in March 2001, is Danho Paulin.

== Districts ==
Attécoubé is separated into almost three dozen districts. These include:

=== Right bank ===
1. Agban Attié
2. Attécoubé 3
3. Djéné Ecaré
4. Santé Ecole
5. Santé 3 Résidentiel 1
6. Santé 3 Résidentiel 2
7. Santé 3 Extension
8. Fromager
9. Déindé
10. Asapsu
11. Awa
12. Jean-Paul 2
13. Santé Carrefour
14. Akélié
15. Lackman
16. Douagoville
17. Camp Douane
18. Jérusalem Résidentiel
19. Jérusalem 1
20. Jérusalem 2
21. Jérusalem 3

=== Left bank ===
1. Sebroko
2. La Paix
3. Lagune
4. Espoir
5. Mosquée
6. Saint-Joseph
7. Ecole
8. Gbebouto
9. Cantonnement Forestier
10. Cité Fairmont 1
11. Cité Fairmont 2
12. Ecole Forestière
13. Bidjanté

== Notable people ==
- Djé D'Avilla (born 2003), footballer
- Jocelin Ta Bi (born 2005), footballer
- Chaka Traorè (born 2004), footballer
- Noel Yobou (born 1982), footballer
