= Freedom Neruda =

Ivorian journalist

- Born: Tiéti Roch d'Assomption; 15 August 1956 (age 70); Duékoué, Ivory Coast
- Occupations: Journalist, Ambassador of the Republic of Ivory Coast to the Islamic Republic of Iran (November 2001- August 2011)
- Known for: editing of Notre Voie, imprisonment
- Awards: International Press Freedom Award (1997) World Press Freedom Hero (2000)

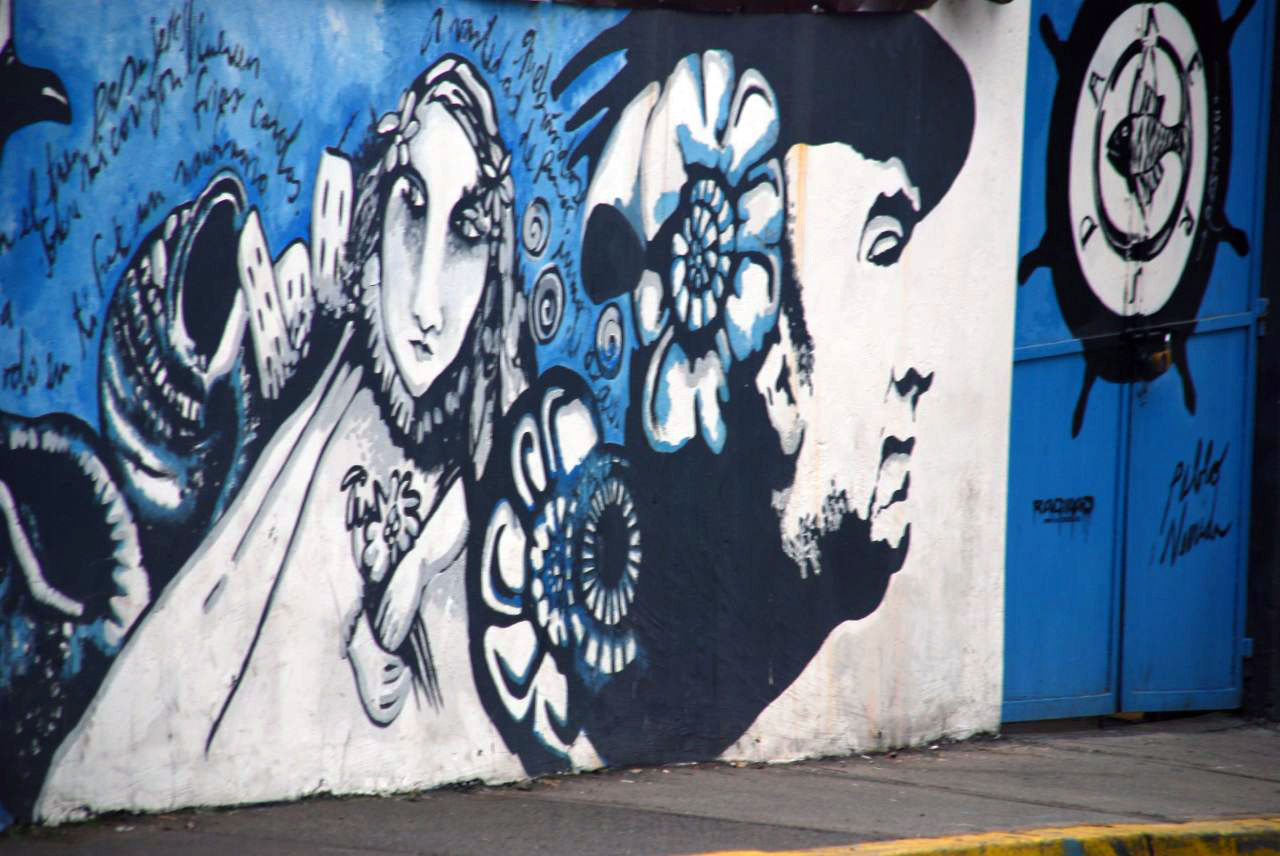
A mural depicting Neruda

Freedom Neruda (born as Tiéti Roch d'Assomption, 15 August 1956) is an Ivorian journalist. In 1996, he was imprisoned for seditious libel after writing a satirical article about Ivorian President Henri Konan Bédié. The following year, he won an International Press Freedom Award from the Committee to Protect Journalists, and in 2000, he was named one of the International Press Institute's 50 World Press Freedom Heroes of the past 50 years.

== Background ==
Neruda was born in Duékoué, Ivory Coast, and is an alumnus of the University of Abidjan. After his graduation, he worked as a high-school mathematics teacher until 1988, when he became a copyeditor at the Ivorian daily Ivoir' Soir. By 1990, he was working as an investigative reporter under the name "Freedom Neruda". This pen name is a homage to Chilean poet Pablo Neruda, whose work Freedom Neruda finds inspiring.

After an unsuccessful attempt to start his own independent newspaper, La Chronique du Soir, Neruda agreed to take over the newly founded La Voie in 1991. With Neruda as its editor-in-chief, La Voie quickly went on to become the best-selling independent newspaper in Ivory Coast. The paper regularly ran critical coverage of the government of President Bédié, resulting in several court appearances on defamation charges and prison sentences for at least six members of the editorial staff. In 1995, the paper's offices were firebombed, but no one was hurt.

== "Il maudit l'ASEC" trial ==
On 18 December 1995, La Voie ran an article on the Ivorian ASEC Mimosas's loss to the South African Orlando Pirates in the finals of football's CAF Champions League. A sidebar by reporter Emmanuel Koré, headlined "Il maudit l’ASEC" ("He cursed/jinxed ASEC"), jokingly suggested that the bad luck of President Bédié's presence had caused the team's defeat; the article also played on the slogans from Bédié's re-election literature of the previous year, in which he promised to bring "good luck" to the nation. Although the sidebar was one of the less serious criticisms of the Bédié government that had appeared in La Voie, by naming the president explicitly, it posed a direct challenge to a 1991 statute allowing the state to prosecute "people who insult government officials or offices" for criminal libel.

Koré and La Voie's publication director Abou Drahamane Sangar were arrested shortly after the article's appearance. A warrant was also issued for Neruda, who evaded arrest for several days to arrange care for his ten-year-old son. On 2 January 1996, Neruda turned himself in at a police station and was also arrested. On 11 January, Neruda, Koré and Sangar were convicted of "offenses against the head of state" and sentenced to two years' imprisonment apiece. Additionally, La Voie was fined three million West African CFA francs (about $6000 USD) and banned from publishing for three months; the paper avoided the ban by publishing under the name L'alternative for the duration of the sentence, returning to its original name when the ban was complete.

During his imprisonment, Neruda continued to write news stories from jail, smuggling them out and publishing them in L'alternative under the apparently female pen name "Bintou Diawara". His topics included a financial scandal and the more lenient sentences given to wealthy Lebanese prisoners. When the three journalists appealed their sentences to the Supreme Court in August, President Bédié appeared on television offering them a pardon if they would withdraw the appeal. Feeling that this would be a tacit admission of guilt, the journalists refused the offer. The Supreme Court rejected their appeal in November, but the three were nonetheless released on 1 January 1997, having served only half of their sentences.

== International recognition ==
In November 1997, 10 months after his release, Neruda was awarded the International Press Freedom Award of the Committee to Protect Journalists, "an annual recognition of courageous journalism". In 2000, the International Press Institute selected him as one of its "50 World Press Freedom Heroes" of the past 50 years, citing his "unwavering commitment to the principles of free expression despite the persistent efforts of President Henri Konan Bédié to silence La Voie's critical coverage of the government".
