= Telecommunications in Ivory Coast =

Telecommunications in Ivory Coast include radio, television, fixed and mobile telephones, and the Internet.

== Radio and television ==
Radio stations:

- 2 state-owned radio stations; some private radio stations; transmissions three international broadcasters are available (2017);
- 2 AM, 9 FM, and 3 shortwave stations (1998).

Radios: 2.26 million (1997).

Television stations:

- 2 state-owned TV stations; no private terrestrial TV stations, but satellite TV subscription service is available (2007);
- 14 stations (1999).

Television sets: 900,000 (1997).

Radio is Ivory Coast's most popular communications medium. BBC World Service broadcasts on FM in Abidjan (94.3), Yamoussoukro (97.7), Bouaké (93.9), San Pedro (103.1) and Man (89.2). Radio France International broadcasts on FM in Abidjan, Yamoussoukro, Bouaké, San Pedro and Krogho. UN peacekeepers launched ONUCI FM in 2005.

The High Audiovisual Communications Authority oversees the regulation and operation of radio and television stations. While there are numerous independent radio stations, the law prohibits them from transmitting any political commentary. There are no private television stations. The government exercises considerable influence over news coverage and program content on the government-run television channel, Radiodiffusion Television Ivoirienne (RTI).

The media were used as propaganda tools during the five-month military standoff between rival claimants to the presidency in early 2011. State broadcaster RTI agitated against election winner Alassane Ouattara. The Ouattara camp set up a rival broadcasting operation. Pro-Ouattara forces ransacked and occupied media outlets loyal to former president, Laurent Gbagbo. RTI resumed broadcasts in August 2011.

== Telephones ==
Calling code: +225

International call prefix: 00

Main lines:

- 268,000 lines in use, 121st in the world (2012);
- 257,900 lines in use, 118th in the world (2004);
- 328,000 lines in use (2003).

Mobile cellular:

- 19.8 million lines, 49th in the world (2012);
- 4.1 million lines, 80th in the world (2006);
- 2.2 million lines, 86th in the world (2005).

Telephone system: well-developed by African standards; telecommunications sector privatized in late 1990s and operational fixed-lines have increased since that time with two fixed-line providers operating over open-wire lines, microwave radio relay, and fiber-optics; 90% digitalized; with multiple mobile-cellular service providers competing in the market, usage has increased sharply to roughly 80 per 100 persons (2011).

Satellite earth stations: 2 Intelsat (1 Atlantic Ocean and 1 Indian Ocean) (2011).

Communications cables: 4 submarine cables:

- Africa Coast to Europe (ACE), submarine communications cable is a cable system along the west coast of Africa and on to Portugal and France.
- South Atlantic 3/West Africa Submarine Cable (SAT-3/WASC), a submarine cable linking Portugal and Spain to South Africa and Asia, with connections to several West African countries along the route (2011).
- GLO-1, submarine communications cable system along the west coast of Africa and on to the UK, owned by Nigerian telecoms operator Globacom.
- Main One, a submarine cable stretching from Portugal to South Africa with landings along the route in various west African countries.

There are two competing companies offering fixed telephone services. Five firms offer mobile cellular services with two more ready to begin. South Africa’s MTN and France Telecom-owned Orange are the largest followed by GSM operators Moov (owned by Etisalat of the UAE), KoZ (operated by the Lebanese Comium Group) and Oricel Green Network (backed by Libya's LAP Green). Mobile cellular penetration is well above the African average.

== Internet ==
Top-level domain: .ci

Internet users:

- 522,231 users, 130th in the world; 2.4% of the population, 197th in the world (2012);
- 967,300 users, 103rd in the world (2009);
- 160,000 users, 127th in the world (2005);
- 90,000 users (2002).

Fixed broadband: 52,685 subscriptions, 113th in the world; 0.2% of the population, 157th in the world (2012).

Wireless broadband: Unknown (2012).

Internet hosts:

- 9,115 hosts, 137th in the world (2012);
- 2,534 hosts, 122nd in the world (2006).

IPv4:: 133,632 addresses allocated, less than 0.05% of the world total, 6.1 addresses per 1000 people (2012).

Internet service providers: 3 ISPs, Africa Online, Aviso, and Vizocom.

Internet broadband is largely underdeveloped due to the high cost of international bandwidth, caused by limited access to the one international fibre optic submarine cable serving the country. A second cable landed in November 2011, with up to three more to follow in the future. Reductions in prices for some ADSL, WiMAX, and EV-DO wireless broadband services have taken place following the landing of the second cable. The first 3G license was awarded in March 2012 and the first 3.5G mobile broadband service has been launched, offering up to 42 Mbit/s using HSPA+ technology.

=== Internet censorship and surveillance ===
There are no government restrictions on access to the Internet or reports that the government monitors e-mail or Internet chat rooms without appropriate legal authority. Authorities permit suspended newspapers to publish their full content online. Internet use in the country is low and the Internet does not yet play a large role in the political or economic life of the country.

The constitution and law provide for freedom of speech and press; however, there are limited restrictions on press freedom. The law prohibits incitement to violence, ethnic hatred, rebellion, and insulting the head of state or other senior members of the government. Criminal libel is punishable by one to three years in prison. Libel deemed to threaten the national interest is punishable by six months to five years in prison.

The constitution and law provide rights protecting against arbitrary interference with privacy, family, home, or correspondence, but the government does not always respect these rights in practice.

== See also ==
- Radiodiffusion Television Ivoirienne (RTI), state radio and television broadcaster.
- List of terrestrial fibre optic cable projects in Africa
- Economy of Ivory Coast
- Ivory Coast
