= TV Notre Patrie =

Defunct pirate television station in Bouaké, Ivory Coast

- Country: Côte d'Ivoire

Programming
- Language: French

History
- Launched: 21 October 2002; 23 years ago

TV Notre Patrie (TV Our Homeland), also known as TVNP and by its slogan La Chaîne de la Liberté, was a pirate television station originating out of Bouaké, a city which, in the 2000s, was controlled by rebels of the New Forces. The station broadcast on La Première's local transmitter for a few hours a day, replacing the national signal coming out of Abidjan, and operated on a shoestring budget. The channel closed in 2011, during the 2010-2011 crisis.

== History ==
TVNP began broadcasting on 21 October 2002 as Télé-Mutin, shortly after Bouaké was taken over by rebels. By January 2003, the channel was known under its longtime name TV Notre Patrie. The station operated out of a small concrete building and used outdated equipment, such as old camcorders, VCRs and video editing machines seized from RTI, when it had an office there.

In December 2005, the station had thirty refugees, receiving US$2,72 bonuses each month. Its programming was rudimentary, consisting largely of in-house programs catering several topics (cooking, health, culture, religion, children), movies (often from bootlegged copies), political speeches, and, especially, its news service. The channel was heavily criticized by locals, who thought that TVNP was biased and one-sided, as a politicized outlet. The fact that it took over RTI 1's transmitters for a few hours deprived viewers of receiving

On 31 August 2010, TVNP was targeted by CNCA, the Ivorian regulator, which was responded by its manager Bamba Sinima, who said that TVNP would not shut down. Two of its journalists were arrested upon arriving to Abidjan on 28 January 2011. They were reportedly tortured while in prison.
