= Tour Postel 2001 =

Skyscraper in Abidjan, Ivory Coast

- Interactive map of the Tour Postel 2001 area

General information
- Status: Completed
- Type: Commercial
- Location: Abidjan, Ivory Coast
- Opening: 1984

Height
- Roof: 105.7 m (347 ft)

Technical details
- Floor count: 26

Tour Postel 2001 is a skyscraper in Abidjan, Ivory Coast. The 26-story building was completed in 1984. It is located on the street Rue Jesse Owens. Once considered dangerous, and as a result condemned, the tower has since undergone a 14 billion CFA franc renovation.

== See also ==
- List of tallest buildings in Africa
