= Pierre Djédji Amondji =

Ivorian politician

Pierre Djédji Amondji is the former governor (mayor) of Abidjan, the largest city in Ivory Coast. He served from 2002 to 2006. He is a member of the Ivorian Popular Front party.

== See also ==
- Timeline of Abidjan, 2000s
