= St. Paul's Cathedral, Abidjan =

Catholic cathedral in Côte d'Ivoire

St. Paul's Cathedral, Abidjan Cathédrale Saint-Paul d'Abidjan
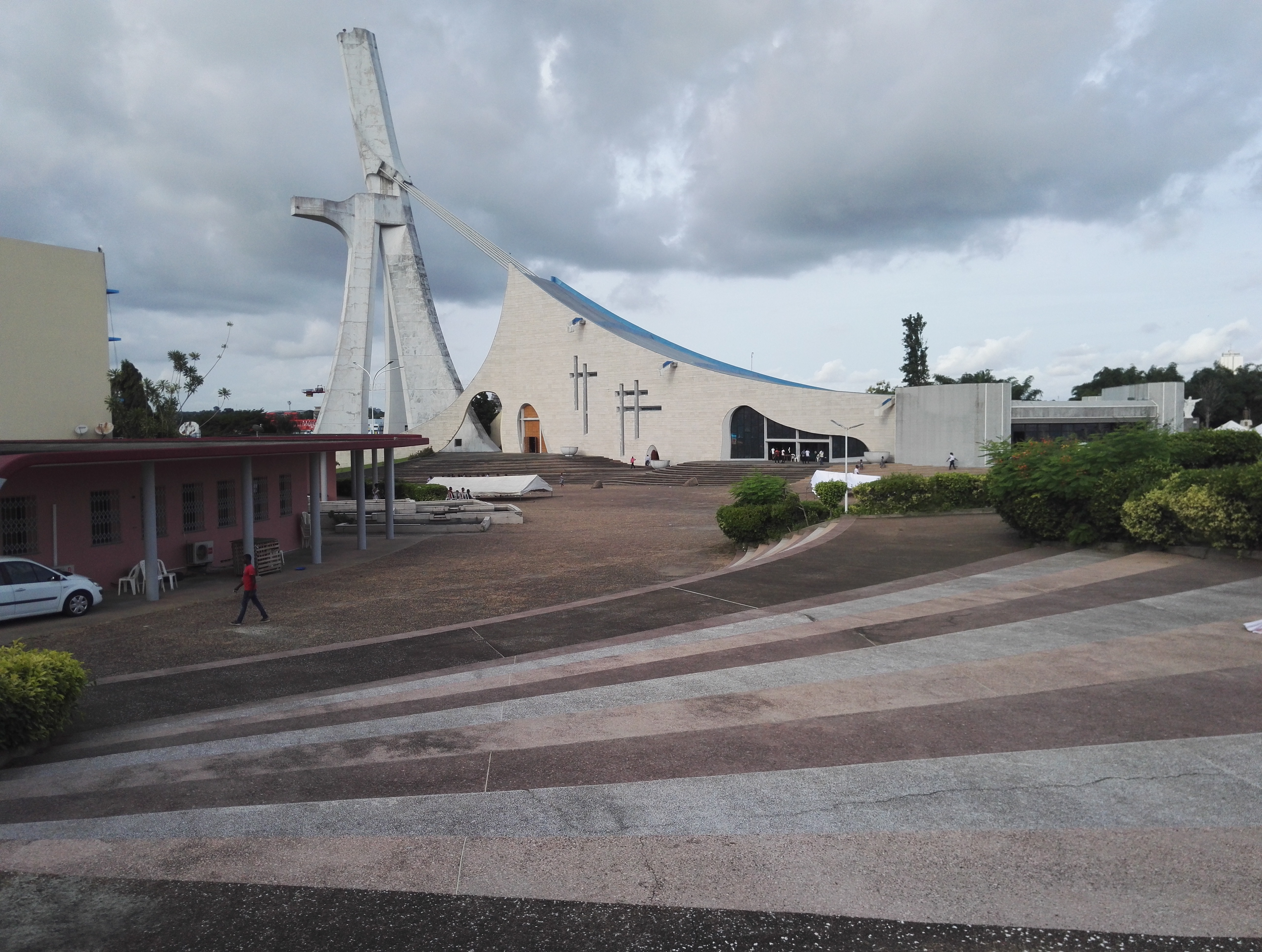

Religion
- Affiliation: Roman Catholic
- Province: Roman Catholic Archdiocese of Abidjan.
- Year consecrated: 1985
- Status: Active

Location
- Location: Abidjan, Côte d'Ivoire.
- Interactive map of St. Paul's Cathedral, Abidjan; Cathédrale Saint-Paul d'Abidjan
- Coordinates: 5.332778°N 4.02°W

Architecture
- Architect: Aldo Spirito
- Style: Modern
- Groundbreaking: May 11, 1980
- Completed: 1985
- Construction cost: US $11.7 million
- Capacity: 5,000 (3,500 seating and 1,500 standing)

St Paul's Cathedral (French: Cathédrale Saint-Paul d'Abidjan) is a Roman Catholic cathedral located in the city of Abidjan, Côte d'Ivoire. The cathedral, which was designed by the Italian architect Aldo Spirito, serves as the mother church for the Roman Catholic Archdiocese of Abidjan.

The first stone of the cathedral was consecrated on May 11, 1980, by Pope John Paul II during his first pastoral visit to Côte d'Ivoire. He further dedicated the building upon completion on August 10, 1985, during a second visit to the country to lay the foundation for the Basilica of Our Lady of Peace in Yamoussoukro. The cost of implementing this modern architectural edifice, reputedly the second largest church on the African continent (as of 2002), and one of the largest cathedrals in the world, was estimated at $12 million. Architecturally, the cathedral is unique and modern, built to meet the aspirations of the people of Côte d'Ivoire.

== Location ==
The striking external feature of the cathedral (which attracts visitors at the entrance itself) is the tall concrete structure, which is shaped like an anthropomorphic giant. It is dominantly located on a hillock providing commanding views of the city of Abidjan, and overlooking the Bay of Cocody.

== History ==
Planning for building the cathedral was allotted to Italian architect Aldo Spirito in 1980, under the directive of Félix Houphouët-Boigny, President of the Côte d'Ivoire. The architect designated for the design was Pope John Paul II, who blessed the foundation stone during his visit to Côte d'Ivoire in 1980. The construction was completed over a period of five years by a joint sector company of Sonitra and the Government of Ivory Coast in association with Sonitra, an Israeli firm. The cathedral was formally consecrated by the pope during his second visit to Abidjan in August 1985. It is the second largest cathedral in Africa.

Saint Paul's Cathedral served as a refuge for approximately 1,800 Ivorians fleeing violence during the height of the 2010–2011 Ivorian crisis which engulfed Abidjan.

== Architecture ==
=== Exterior ===
St Paul's Cathedral in Abidjan.

The structure of the Cross, which is winged on both flanks, is held in position through seven cables which are anchored to the main building of the cathedral which is in a triangular shape; it creates an elevated vision that the structure is being tugged towards the lagoon. The materials used for building this unique edifice consists of concrete, steel, travertine (a form of limestone deposited by mineral springs), stones and sheets of stained glasses. Symbolism represented by the overall structure of the cathedral and the cross is of Jesus Christ spreading his arms, akin to the statue of Christ in Rio, with metaphysical significance of pull towards the ultimate trinity.

The external feature of the cross of the cathedral is also inferred to depict a view as though a devotee is bent on his knees offering prayers with his cloak flying backwards merging into the attractive concrete slab which is integral to the cathedral's roof.

On the exterior face of the cathedral there are fourteen panels of different sizes in many colours, which are made in terracotta ceramics with the Cross and the story of Christ as the main theme (as relevant to the local ethnic perceptions). These panels are affixed sequentially (matching the story) on the side wall of the steps leading from the lagoon to the forecourt of the cathedral.

Saint Paul's Cathedral of Abidjan main entrance

The cathedral's renovation is estimated to cost 750 million Francs; a fund raising campaign for realizing the funds was launched in March 2008.

=== Interior ===
The cathedral has a total area of 4,300 metres (14,107.61 ft), with 3,500 metres (11,482.94 ft) of usable space. It can accommodate 5,000 devotees, with seating for 3,500, with the remainder being standing space. The cathedral accommodates a Christian room for prayer, salt catechesis, offices of the parish, residence for the clergy (the bishops and priests), a library, a religious museum, a conference hall and media rooms.

St. Paul's Cathedral's interior

The cathedral has six stained glass windows covering a total surface area of 370 metres (1,213.91 ft), which were also designed by Aldo Spirito. The artistic imagery inside the cathedral is not only Biblical in theme but also has a special focus on the Ivorian peoples’ faith in Christianity. In addition, the interior of the cathedral is embellished with paintings of the Virtues, mosaics of the Sacraments and twelve panels made in polychrome ceramics. The stained glass panels were designed to withstand a wind pressure caused by wind velocity of 100 kilometres (62 mi)/hour. The themes for each panel are related to the life of St. Paul.

Cathédrale Saint-Paul d'Abidjan interior, Côte d'Ivoire

There are large paintings near the altar, 200 centimetres (79 in)x150 centimetres (59 in), which depict themes different from those drawn on the stained glass windows. The themes chosen are specific to the propagation of the Virtues of the Cross – Theological Virtues of Faith, Hope and Charity, and Cardinal Virtues of Temperance, Justice, Prudence and Courage, displayed through abstract and angelic figures. Mixed colour techniques have been used in painting on the canvas; mono or bi-color brushed in asymmetric positions have been used for the background while angels painted in bright colours are highlighted.

The notable feature of the stained glass window near the altar is the journey of St. Paul to Damascus. The stained glass panel on the left side wall facing the altar has features drawn on St Paul's lifetime activities; on the left side of the panel he is shown penning letters to the people of different denominations; the middle part shows his tour to Rome to be judged by the Pope, and at the lowest part is his giving sermon to people of various denominations. The panel on the right wall facing the altar is similar to that on the left wall but is dated 28 October representing the earliest stage of interaction with the people of Grand Bassam, Côte d'Ivoire and the visiting evangelist in the process of proselytization.

Another alluring stained glass panel is of Jesus showing the way forward with a storm brewing in Lake Galillee. Also is a panel in which the evangelists are shown landing on the shores of Africa, joyously surveying the local people, the wild animals such as elephants and gazelles and the vegetation of palm trees.

== Bibliography ==
- Aynor, Hanan S.; Avimor, Shimon (1986). Relations Between Israel and Asian and African States: Côte d'Ivoire. Hebrew University of Jerusalem, Harry S. Truman Research Institute for the Advancement of Peace, Leonard Davis Institute for International Relations.
- Elleh, Namdi (2002). Architecture and Power in Africa. Greenwood Publishing Group. ISBN 978-0-275-97679-8.
- Levin, Adam (2003). Wonder Safaris. Struik. ISBN 978-1-77007-242-8.
- Planet, Lonely (2009). West Africa. Lonely Planet. ISBN 978-1-74104-821-6.
