= RTI 2 =

Ivorian television channel

- Country: Côte d'Ivoire

Programming
- Language: French

Ownership
- Owner: Radiodiffusion Television Ivoirienne
- Sister channels: RTI 1

History
- Launched: November 1983; 42 years ago
- Former names: Canal 2 (1983–1991); TV2 (1991–2011)

Links
- Website: www.rti.ci

RTI 2 is an Ivorian television channel. The channel targets a younger audience.

== History ==
RTI 2 started broadcasting in November 1983. Unlike the existing RTI channel, its coverage area was limited to Abidjan and adjacent areas. As Canal 2, the channel's transmitter covered a radius of 50km, with limited programming on Tuesdays and Fridays from 8:30pm.

After broadcasting as an experimental service for several years, RTI reformatted the channel as TV2 on 1 November 1991, using the same transmitter as before. The channel broadcast on VHF channel 10, expanding the reach to 150km and was defined by RTI as a "proximity channel for Abidjan". The channel's audience increased after the introduction of a new schedule in March 1997 (redeveloped in 1999). The impulse for the creation of a regular second channel was given to Amadou Thiam, Félix Houphouët-Boigny's former ambassador of the Ivory Coast to Morocco.

In the early 2000s, TV2 was an affiliate of the French service of TVAfrica, the continental television network that existed between 1998 and 2003. La Première was a sports affiliate.

As of 2008, one of its most-popular programs was Le Direct, a weekly animated satire of local and international events. It was a segment inserted inside Il faut le dire..., an interview program which was presented by Claude-Frank About, a writer who was TV2's director from 2006 to 2011. It was introduced as part of a new schedule in March 2008.

In April-May 2009, TV2's transmitter had its power cut, with its transmitter having less than 4 kW of power.

The channel was rebranded RTI 2 in 2011; in Easter 2014 it started broadcasting its over-the-air signal to Bouaké in the central area of the country, up until then the signal was limited to Abidjan. In May 2016, Didier Bléou was appointed its new director. He was followed in 2025 by Mariam Coulibaly.
