= Notre Voie =

- Type: Daily newspaper
- Founded: 1991; 34 years ago
- Political alignment: Ivorian Popular Front
- Language: French
- Website: www.notrevoie.com

Notre Voie (formerly known as La Voie) is an Ivorian newspaper founded in 1991. Its reporters have been the subject of several high-profile criminal trials, and its editor Freedom Neruda was named a World Press Freedom Hero for his work with the paper.

== Beginning of Neruda's editorship ==
After an unsuccessful attempt to start his own independent newspaper, La Chronique du Soir, Neruda agreed to take over La Voie in 1991. With Neruda as its editor-in-chief, La Voie quickly went on to become the best-selling independent newspaper in Côte d'Ivoire. The paper regularly ran critical coverage of the government of Ivorian President Henri Konan Bédié, resulting in several court appearances on defamation charges and prison sentences for at least six members of the editorial staff. In 1995, the paper's offices were firebombed, but no one was hurt.

== "Il maudit l'ASEC" trial ==
On 18 December 1995, La Voie ran an article on the Ivorian ASEC Mimosas's loss to the South African Orlando Pirates in the finals of football's CAF Champions League. A sidebar by reporter Emmanuel Koré, headlined "Il maudit l'ASEC" ("He cursed/jinxed ASEC"), jokingly suggested that the bad luck of President Bédié's presence had caused the team's defeat; the article also played on the slogans from Bédié's re-election literature of the previous year, in which he promised to bring "good luck" to the nation. Although the sidebar was one of the less serious criticisms of the Bédié government that had appeared in La Voie, by naming the president explicitly, it posed a direct challenge to a 1991 statute allowing the state to prosecute "people who insult government officials or offices" for criminal libel.

Koré and La Voie's publication director Abou Drahamane Sangar were arrested shortly after the article's appearance. A warrant was also issued for Neruda, who evaded arrest for several days to arrange care for his ten-year-old son. On 2 January 1996, Neruda turned himself in at a police station and was also arrested. On 11 January, Neruda, Koré and Sangar were convicted of "offenses against the head of state" and sentenced to two years' imprisonment apiece. Additionally, La Voie was fined three million West African CFA francs (about US$6000) and banned from publishing for three months; the paper avoided the ban by publishing under the name L'alternative for the duration of the sentence, returning to its original name when the ban was complete.

During his imprisonment, Neruda continued to write news stories from jail, smuggling them out and publishing them in L'alternative under the apparently female pen name "Bintou Diawara". His topics included a financial scandal and the more lenient sentences given to wealthy Lebanese prisoners. When the three journalists appealed their sentences to the Supreme Court in August, President Bédié appeared on television offering them a pardon if they would withdraw the appeal. Feeling that this would be a tacit admission of guilt, the journalists refused the offer. The Supreme Court rejected their appeal in November, but the three were nonetheless released on 1 January 1997, having served only half of their sentences. Neruda was later awarded the International Press Freedom Award from the Committee to Protect Journalists, and in 2000, he was named one of the International Press Institute's 50 World Press Freedom Heroes of the past 50 years.

== 2010–2011 Ivorian crisis ==
Following the 2010 presidential election, both the incumbent Laurent Gbagbo and opposition candidate Alassane Ouattara declared victory. Gbago refused to step down despite the United Nations proclaiming Ouattara the winner. Fighting soon broke out between Gbagbo's Ivorian Popular Front (FPI) and Ouattara's Rally of the Republicans (RDR), causing some commentators to refer to the crisis as the Second Ivorian Civil War.

Notre Voie, which BBC News has described as "openly very sympathetic to the FPI", supported Gbagbo. After his 11 April 2011 arrest by pro-Ouattara forces, the paper's offices were ransacked by protesters. The paper relocated to the suburbs of Abidjan, and Republican Forces of Côte d'Ivoire soldiers were stationed at the paper's headquarters until August; according to Reporters Without Borders, the soldiers also barred staff from the premises, preventing them from using equipment and the paper's archives.

In November 2011, the Ivorian government charged Notre Voie reporters César Etou and Boga Sivori and administrator Didier Dépry with "incitement to theft, looting and destruction of the property of others through the press". The three began a hunger strike after their arrest. Several African media watchdog groups protested, including the Media Foundation for West Africa, which described the charges as "bogus". The journalists were released after thirteen days in custody when a judge dismissed the case.
