= Radiodiffusion Television Ivoirienne =

Public broadcaster of Ivory Coast

Radiodiffusion-Télévision ivoirienne (RTI)
- Type: Broadcast radio and television
- Country: Côte d'Ivoire
- Availability: National; International
- Owner: Government of Côte d'Ivoire
- Key people: Director General: Fausséni DEMBELE
- Launch date: Radio: 1961; 65 years ago Television: 1962; 64 years ago
- Former names: Radio: Radio Côte d'Ivoire (1961–1991)
- Official website: www.rti.ci

Radiodiffusion-Télévision ivoirienne (RTI) is the publicly owned radio and television authority of Côte d'Ivoire. It is financed through a combination of television and radio licences, advertisements, and taxes.

== History ==
The RTI Group (Groupe RTI) is an Ivorian public limited company with a capital of six billion CFA francs, created on October 26, 1962. It is a public body for the design of radio and audiovisual content, financed by royalties, advertising and subsidies. of State. Placed under the supervision of the Ministry of Communication, the RTI has a board of directors chaired by Aka Sayé Lazare. Journalist Fausséni Dembélé, known as “Al Séni Dembelé” has been the current managing director since his appointment in February 2019.

Born from the will of the President of the Republic Félix Houphouët-Boigny (1960–1993), who wanted to make it an instrument of development at the service of the populations, the RTI originally broadcast only 5 h 30 min of weekly radio programs . It only had a single 10 kW transmitter installed in Abidjan, in the town of Abobo, and a 47 m2 studio in the town of Plateau, its current headquarters.

It was four years later, on August 4, 1966, that the Maison de la Télévision was inaugurated in Cocody, equipped with two studios of 100m2 and 400m2 and state-of-the-art technical equipment of the time.

The first tests is in 1970, In 1973, television switched to full-color. The effort to cover the territory, undertaken seven years earlier, materialized with the opening of a television news antenna in 1973 in Bouaké, in the center of the country, which was transformed into a regional station in 1980. This coverage of the national territory ends in 1988 with the inauguration of the Dabakala transmitter.

Following the launch of a second television channel, Canal 2, on December 9, 1983, the extant RTI television channel was renamed La Première.

During the Ivorian crisis of 2010–2011, the channel briefly interrupted its broadcast from March 31 to April 1 and again from April 4 to 8, 2011, following attacks by the New Forces of Côte d'Ivoire, bombings of UNOCI and the Licorne Force allied to the president recognized by the international community, Alassane Ouattara. He himself created a television channel called Télévision Côte d'Ivoire (TCI) which began broadcasting on January 22, 2011.

After having broadcast TCI programs since April 11, 2011, on August 9, 2011, the channel was broadcasting again with the RTI1 logo, having integrated TCI's team into its staff.

== Activities ==
RTI currently operates two radio networks, in addition to four national television networks

=== Radio ===
- Radio Côte d'Ivoire (also known as La Nationale): News and general programming
- Fréquence 2: light entertainment programming

=== Television ===
- La Première : News and general programming
- RTI 2: Music and Entertainment
- La 3 (also known as RTI 3): Sport and music programming
- RTI Bouaké: Regional channel

Former channels

- RTI Music TV: Popular music
- RTI Sport TV: Sport programming

== Business partnerships ==
The RTI group has developed partnerships with a number of foreign broadcasters and corporations. RTI has a program sharing agreement with the Benin national broadcaster LC2 and the domestic broadcast network KBS.

Thomson France has been contracted, to refurbish the broadcasting infrastructure of RFI television and radio.

== Infrastructural growth ==
RFI has begun a push for total radio and television coverage of the nation prior to the 2008 general elections, and has a 9 billion (us) CFA Franc program to rebuild broadcast facilities. The 13 existing will be refurbished and 14 additional modern broadcast points will be constructed. This program includes the building of a number of new technical buildings and business offices throughout the country.

Existing television stations

- Cocody
- Abobo
- Digo
- Dimbokro
- Niangbo
- Niangue
- Bouaké
- Dabakala
- Koun Fao
- Man
- Séguéla
- Tiémé
- Touba

Planned new stations :

- Bonoua
- Bouaké
- Becouéfin
- Maféré
- Mbengué
- Zoukougbeu
- Kong
- Kouakoussekro
- Taï
- Grobo
- Toulepleu
- Tehini
- Tingrela
- Grand-Lahou

=== Rebuilding broadcast facilities in the north ===
The end of the Ivorian Civil War of 2002-2007 left both the infrastructure and reputation of the RTI media in the former rebel held areas of the country damaged. Much of the population in the northern rebel regions see the RTI news programs as culpable in the propaganda push of the national government. RTI has set out plans to re-extend broadcast facilities and programming to these former rebel regions.

=== Internationalisation ===
Fréquence 2 and La Première are planned to both be broadcast internationally, with the later now available by satellite, shortwave and cable in France.

== See also ==
- Media of Ivory Coast
