= Le Plateau, Abidjan =

Central business district of Abidjan, Côte d'Ivoire

Le Plateau
- Urban commune and central business district of Abidjan
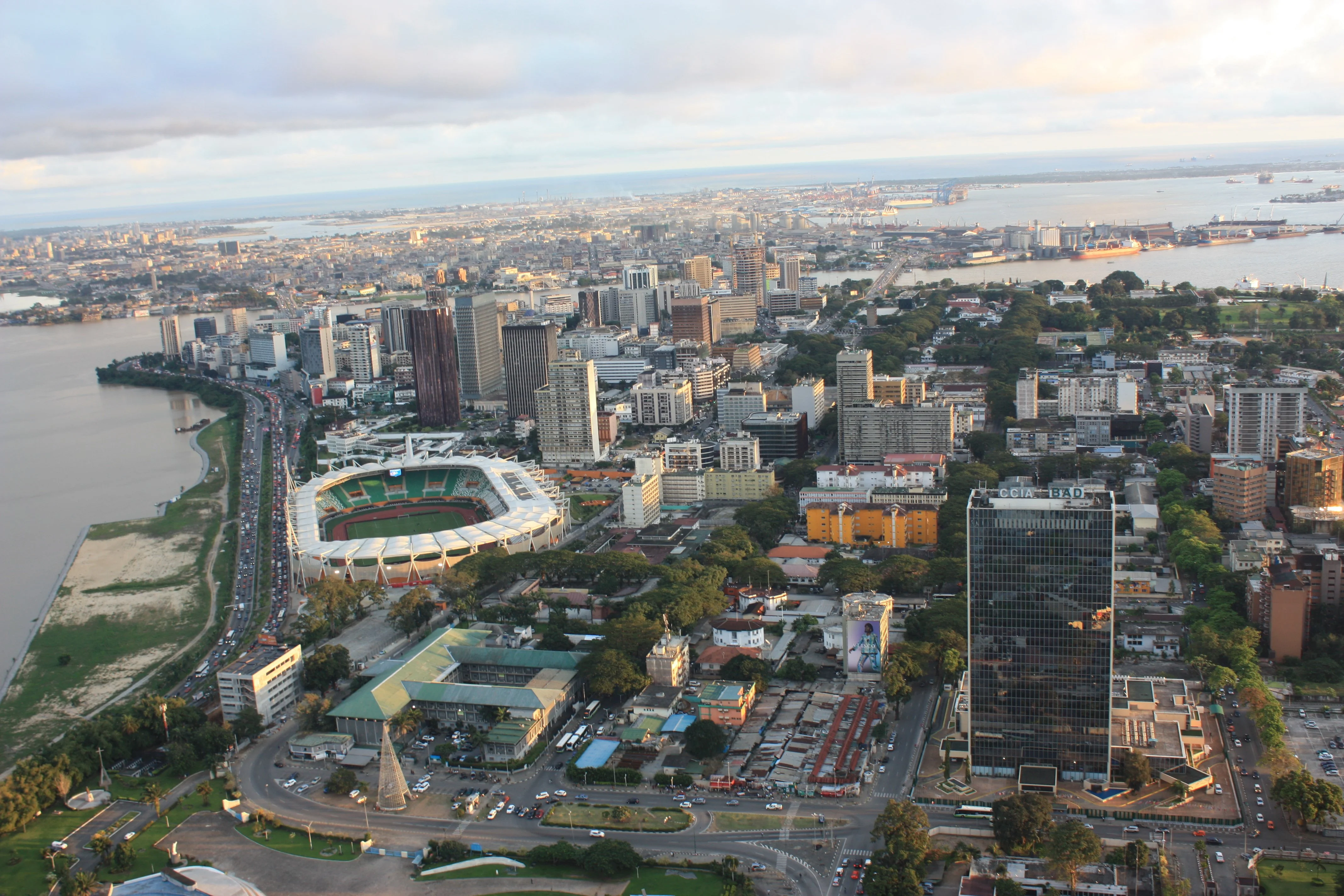
- View of Le Plateau in January 2025

- Location in Abidjan

- Location in Ivory Coast
- Coordinates: 5°19′N 4°1′W
- Country: Ivory Coast
- District: Abidjan

Area
  - Total: 6.151 km^{2} (2.375 sq mi)
- Elevation: 20 m (66 ft)

Population (2021)
  - Total: 7,186
  - Density: 1,168/km^{2} (3,026/sq mi)
- Time zone: UTC+0 (GMT)

The Plateau is the central business district of Abidjan, the economic capital of Côte d'Ivoire. It is one of the 10 urban communes of the city. The Plateau is surrounded by the municipality of Yopougon to the west, to the south by the Ébrié Lagoon. As a central business district, it brings together most of the city's administrative and commercial activities.

Numerous media-related businesses, including production houses, television stations, and advertising agencies, are located directly in the Plateaux district. Most of the large Ivorian firms have their headquarters in Plateau. It also has a very lively market.

Nicknamed by some the "Little Paris" or "Little Manhattan", the Plateau with its towers and buildings overlooks the Ébrié Lagoon. Since the creation of the railway district, to accommodate the terminus of the Abidjan-Niger railway line, the Plateau has rapidly developed to become the administrative, commercial and financial center of Côte d'Ivoire, and holds an important place in West Africa.

The area is also home to Félix Houphouët-Boigny Stadium and the cathédrale Saint-Paul.

A notable feature is the population of thousands of bats after dark, which gather above the lagoon to hunt mosquitoes and other insects.

== Architecture ==
The commune of Plateau has many office towers, hosts of ministries and several companies. Its architecture varies between modernism, for certain monuments such as the cathédrale Saint-Paul or the Presidential Palace and several other buildings, and functionalism, for the majority of buildings. The Plateau is a model of town planning typical of the 1960s and 70s.
