= Fraternité Matin =

Fraternité Matin or Frat' Mat' is an Ivorian newspaper headquartered in Abidjan.

President of the Ivory Coast Félix Houphouët Boigny established the paper on 9 December 1964.
