= La Première (RTI) =

Ivorian television channel

RTI 1
- Country: Côte d'Ivoire

Programming
- Language: French

Ownership
- Owner: Radiodiffusion Television Ivoirienne
- Sister channels: RTI 2

History
- Launched: 7 August 1963; 62 years ago

Links
- Website: www.rti.ci

La Première (RTI) (French pronunciation: [la pʁəmjɛʁ]) is an Ivorian television channel. Originally known as Radio Télévision Ivoirienne (RTI) from 1963 to 1983, the channel began using its current name in 1983 following the launch of a second television channel.

== History ==
As of the time of its independence in 1960, the Ivory Coast only had one radio station. The passage of Law nº62-402 on 31 October 1962 led to the founding of RTI with the aim of creating a television service.

It was first broadcast on 7 August 1963, established by the then President of the Republic Félix Houphouët-Boigny who wanted to make it an instrument of development. Broadcasting at the time of launch was done for 5 1/2 hours a week, paling to Volta Vision's 48 hours. At the time, RTI's missions were entrusted to a state concession protocol, as an actor in the development of national unity.

The first day's programming started at 7:30pm and ended at 9pm. This included a national and international news bulletin. The footage for the news service was flown in from 12-ton containers and broadcast using Thomson-CSF equipment, who installed a 10 kW transmitter in Abobo and 200 meter high antenna. These "experimental" broadcasts were already done with high quality pictures and sound.

Initially it operated from provisional studios in a small villa in the administrative quarter of Plateau in Abidjan. It opened a second station in Dotenzia, Bouaké in December 1963, due to the high number of television receivers being bought in Abidjan alone. By 1965, practically one third of the country was covered by television signals. On 4 August 1966, two studios in Cocody, 100m2 and 400m2 respectively were built with quality equipment, increasing the daily schedule to five hours. The daytime schedule ran from 12:30pm to 1:30pm and the evening schedule from 7:15pm to 10pm Mondays to Saturdays; while on Sundays it ran from 12:30pm to 1:30pm and 4pm to 10pm. Two daily news editions were broadcast, at 1pm and 7:45pm. A new transmitter was inaugurated in Dabakala in 1968, while in 1970 the schedule increased by one hour. During its early years, it received technical support from OCORA (merged with the ORTF) in 1969 to expand its coverage. By 1971, it started carrying an educational service during daytime hours. These courses started in October that year.

In 1973 the station began broadcasting in color. The educational television project ended in April 1981 due to budget issues.

Following the launch of a second television channel, RTI 2 on 9 December 1983, RTI was renamed La Première.

As of 1988, RTI's first channel was carried over eight television transmitters covering 85-90% of the country's population. Some of the equipments used for the former educational television service were readapted.

On 24 December 1999, under the presidency of Henri Konan Bedié, the first coup d'état in the country broke out, led by Robert Gueï. The latter as well as the rebels who accompanied him seized the channel by force in order to inform the Ivorian people of the situation, either after the fall of the presidency and Henri Konan Bedié and the takeover of power by Robert Gueï. Following his assassination on 19 September 2002, the latter's body was shown on the same channel, where he had announced his takeover of power a few years earlier.

Beginning in 2002, its frequencies in Bouaké were hijacked by TVNP (TV Notre Patrie/Our Homeland TV) a few hours a day, whose output consisted of political speeches, cultural programs and its newscast.

During the Ivorian Crisis of 2010-2011, the channel became propaganda for outgoing President Laurent Gbagbo. During the 2010 Ivorian presidential elections, the Independent Electoral Commission (CEI) and the international community recognized Alassane Ouattara as the winner, while the constitutional council recognized Laurent Gbagbo as the winner. RTI did not immediately relay the results of these elections, because Laurent Gbagbo, who was the outgoing president during this period, did not agree with them. The channel, obeying its head of state, therefore did not proclaim them. During the period of antagonism between the two channels, the Ivorian people criticized them for not being properly interested in their suffering and real problems, but also for not sufficiently proclaiming peace and reconciliation in the country. RTI being the only news channel in Côte d'Ivoire, during the creation of TCI, many journalists migrated from one channel to another. Some judged that the RTI did not have an objective aim, others thought that the principles, ethics and deontology of the journalistic profession were not respected and that it was better to change the channel. The channel really belongs to Laurent Gbagbo's clan. Furthermore, under the latter's orders, the foreign media which announced the information in their country that Alassane Ouattara was the winner of the presidential elections in Côte d'Ivoire were cut off throughout the Ivorian territory. It was only 24 hours after the end of the elections that RTI announced that Laurent Gbagbo had won the elections, which marked the start of the conflict. It was the only news channel present in the south of the country, as foreign channels had been banned there since the election results. A demonstration took place in the old Cocody district, that of the RTI. Supporters of Alassane Ouattara's clan aimed to march towards the channel's headquarters. However, heavy fighting interrupted their intentions.

It briefly interrupted its broadcast from 31 to 1 April and again from 4 to 8 April 2011 following attacks by the Forces nouvelles de Côte d'Ivoire, bombings by UNOCI and the Licorne Force allied to the president recognized by the international community, Alassane Ouattara. He himself created an equally propagandistic television channel called Télévision Côte d'Ivoire (TCI) - having started broadcasting on 22 January 2011.

Each camp had its television channel and radio stations. They therefore made their propaganda through their channel and their radios and competed among themselves. However, the RTI acted with a sort of censorship, and tried to cover up the crude and offensive elements of the situation while the TCI showed the bloody part of the conflict and was more brutal in its way of sharing the information. It was with the latter that the famous slogan "Gbagbo Dégage" was discovered, which shows the desire of pro-Ouattara to exclude the Gbagbo clan from power.

RTI 1's logo upon its return to the airwaves in 2011

After the conflict, TCI disappeared, and RTI wanted to create a new image and put the past, which was painful and bitter, behind it forever. It returned to the airwaves on Saturday, 6 August 2011 with a message of peace and reconciliation in order to redeem herself from the Ivorians. It wanted to put an end to all kinds of rivalry, all hateful conflicts or all fear, and make way for lasting trust and common peace with the Ivorian people. It wanted to once again become the people’s main news channel. To do this, the teams at the head of the RTI group provided the channel with the best technological information and communication elements. The channel wanted to completely change any element that would be likely to recall the events which marked the population during the crisis: the logo will be renewed, as well as the slogan, which changed from "See and hear from all horizons" to "The channel which unites". The latter really marked the desire for reconciliation. The channel will therefore renew its program schedule, which will include programs dedicated to peace and reconciliation. In addition, the interior regions of the country whose access to news channels is reduced compared to the southern regions will see their television studios and antennas rehabilitated.

== Productions ==
- Ma Famille
- The Voice Afrique Francophone
