= 2022–23 Benin Premier League =

Benin Premier League
- Season: 2022–23
- Champions: Coton FC
- Relegated: Energie FC; Sitatunga FC
- Matches: 580
- Goals: 1,127 (1.94 per match)

The 2022–23 Benin Premier League was a top-flight football league in Benin. 36 teams took part in a multi-stage championship: A 16-match regular season followed by a championship round and two regional relegation rounds. Coton were crowned champions and received 10 million in prize money.

In the north group, Energie FC were relegated with six points. In the south group, Calavi-based Sitatunga were relegated after two seasons in the top flight. They lost their final match 3–1 to Avrankou Omnisport, who would have been relegated had they not won.

== League changes ==
Bani Gansé of Banikoara and JS Ouidah were promoted from the second division.

Eternel FC were renamed OFMAS-SAD after receiving sponsorship, while UPI-ONM changed their name to Aziza FC.

== League tables ==
=== Regular season ===
==== Group A ====
Pos	Team	Pld	W	D	L	GF	GA	GD	Pts	Qualification or relegation
1	Buffles du Borgou	16	9	5	2	24	12	+12	32	Qualification to the Championship Round
2	Damissa FC	16	9	4	3	13	6	+7	31	Qualification to the Championship Round
3	US Cavaliers	16	6	8	2	18	11	+7	26	Qualification to the Championship Round
4	AS Takunnin	16	7	4	5	20	9	+11	25	Qualification to the Championship Round
5	Panthères FC	16	5	6	5	12	9	+3	21	Qualification to the Relegation Round
6	Dynamo Parakou	16	5	6	5	9	15	−6	21	Qualification to the Relegation Round
7	Béké Bembèrèkè	16	3	8	5	12	13	−1	17	Qualification to the Relegation Round
8	Réal Sports Parakou	16	1	9	6	3	11	−8	12	Qualification to the Relegation Round
9	Dynamique Djougou	16	1	2	13	6	31	−25	5	Qualification to the Relegation Round

Source: soccerway.com
Rules for classification: 1) points; 2) goal difference; 3) number of goals scored.

==== Group B ====
Pos	Team	Pld	W	D	L	GF	GA	GD	Pts	Qualification or relegation
1	Loto-Popo	16	11	2	3	23	7	+16	35	Qualification to the Championship Round
2	Dadjè FC	16	9	4	3	19	12	+7	31	Qualification to the Championship Round
3	Dynamo Abomey	16	9	3	4	28	15	+13	30	Qualification to the Championship Round
4	Bani Gansè FC	16	8	4	4	21	20	+1	28	Qualification to the Championship Round
5	Hodio FC	16	7	5	4	22	9	+13	26	Qualification to the Relegation Round
6	Tonnerre d'Abomey	16	6	3	7	15	19	−4	21	Qualification to the Relegation Round
7	Espoir FC	16	5	3	8	18	24	−6	18	Qualification to the Relegation Round
8	Energie FC	16	3	2	11	10	25	−15	11	Qualification to the Relegation Round
9	Soleil FC	16	0	2	14	14	39	−25	2	Qualification to the Relegation Round

Source: soccerway.com
Rules for classification: 1) points; 2) goal difference; 3) number of goals scored.

==== Group C ====
Pos	Team	Pld	W	D	L	GF	GA	GD	Pts	Qualification or relegation
1	Coton FC	16	10	6	0	28	5	+23	36	Qualification to the Championship Round
2	Requins de l'Atlantique	16	9	5	2	25	10	+15	32	Qualification to the Championship Round
3	ASPAC	16	7	7	2	20	12	+8	28	Qualification to the Championship Round
4	AS Cotonou	16	6	6	4	17	10	+7	24	Qualification to the Championship Round
5	OFMAS-SAD	16	6	4	6	17	15	+2	22	Qualification to the Relegation Round
6	Aziza FC	16	5	1	10	12	28	−16	16	Qualification to the Relegation Round
7	Adjidja FC	16	3	5	8	10	20	−10	14	Qualification to the Relegation Round
8	AS Police	16	3	3	10	12	29	−17	12	Qualification to the Relegation Round
9	Sitatunga FC	16	2	5	9	8	20	−12	11	Qualification to the Relegation Round

Source: soccerway.com
Rules for classification: 1) points; 2) goal difference; 3) number of goals scored.

==== Group D ====
Pos	Team	Pld	W	D	L	GF	GA	GD	Pts	Qualification or relegation
1	Ayema FC	16	7	7	2	20	10	+10	28	Qualification to the Championship Round
2	ASVO FC	16	7	6	3	23	13	+10	27	Qualification to the Championship Round
3	JA Kétou	16	6	8	2	15	12	+3	26	Qualification to the Championship Round
4	Dragons de l'Ouémé	16	6	7	3	10	9	+1	25	Qualification to the Championship Round
5	Jeunesse Sportive de Pobè	16	6	3	7	16	15	+1	21	Qualification to the Relegation Round
6	Sobemap FC	16	7	5	4	16	14	+2	26	Qualification to the Relegation Round
7	Djeffa FC	16	5	5	6	13	15	−2	20	Qualification to the Relegation Round
8	Avrankou Omnisport	16	2	4	10	10	22	−12	10	Qualification to the Relegation Round
9	JS Ouidah	16	3	1	12	12	25	−13	10	Qualification to the Relegation Round

Source: soccerway.com
Rules for classification: 1) points; 2) goal difference; 3) number of goals scored.

=== Championship round ===
Teams did not play matches against teams from their regular season group.

Pos	Team	Pld	W	D	L	GF	GA	GD	Pts	Qualification or relegation
1	Coton (C)	24	16	5	3	29	13	+16	53	Champions, Qualification to the 2023–24 CAF Champions League
2	Loto-Popo	24	15	6	3	32	13	+19	51	
3	Ayema FC	24	12	3	9	28	23	+5	39	
4	Dadjè FC	24	11	4	9	24	21	+3	37	
5	Dynamo Abomey	24	8	10	6	27	23	+4	34	
6	US Cavaliers	24	7	11	6	20	16	+4	32	
7	ASVO FC	24	6	13	5	17	13	+4	31	
8	Damissa FC	24	8	7	9	21	20	+1	31	
9	JA Kétou	24	8	7	9	23	25	−2	31	
10	ASPAC	24	7	9	8	18	20	−2	30	
11	AS Cotonou	24	6	11	7	15	16	−1	29	
12	AS Takunnin	24	7	8	9	22	26	−4	29	
13	Bani Gansè FC	24	7	7	10	16	23	−7	28	
14	Requins de l'Atlantique	24	4	9	11	19	29	−10	21	
15	Buffles du Borgou	24	5	6	13	18	34	−16	21	
16	Dragons de l’Ouémé	24	2	10	12	14	28	−14	16	

Source: soccerway.com
Rules for classification: 1) points; 2) goal difference; 3) number of goals scored.
(C) Champions

=== Relegation round ===
==== North Group ====
Pos	Team	Pld	W	D	L	GF	GA	GD	Pts	Qualification or relegation
1	Tonnerre d'Abomey	10	6	3	1	13	4	+9	21	
2	Soleil FC	10	5	3	2	19	12	+7	18	
3	Dynamo Parakou	10	4	3	3	14	10	+4	15	
4	Hodio FC	10	4	3	3	10	9	+1	15	
5	Réal Sports Parakou	10	3	4	3	8	6	+2	13	
6	Espoir FC	10	3	3	4	5	6	−1	12	
7	Dynamique Djougou	10	2	5	3	9	13	−4	11	
8	Béké Bembèrèkè	10	3	2	5	6	11	−5	11	
9	Panthères FC	10	2	4	4	9	14	−5	10	
10	Energie FC (R)	10	0	6	4	7	15	−8	6	Relegation

Source: soccerway.com
Rules for classification: 1) points; 2) goal difference; 3) number of goals scored.
(R) Relegated

==== South Group ====
Pos	Team	Pld	W	D	L	GF	GA	GD	Pts	Qualification or relegation
1	Djeffa FC	10	5	2	3	15	9	+6	17	
2	Sobemap FC	10	5	2	3	11	7	+4	17	
3	Jeunesse Sportive de Pobè	10	5	2	3	13	10	+3	17	
4	Adjidja FC	10	5	1	4	15	8	+7	16	
5	JS Ouidah	10	4	3	3	9	9	0	15	
6	Aziza FC	10	4	2	4	12	12	0	14	
7	Avrankou Omnisport	10	3	3	4	13	17	−4	12	
8	AS Police	10	3	2	5	6	17	−11	11	
9	OFMAS-SAD	10	2	4	4	7	11	−4	10	
10	Sitatunga FC (R)	10	2	3	5	12	13	−1	9	Relegation

Source: soccerway.com
Rules for classification: 1) points; 2) goal difference; 3) number of goals scored.
(R) Relegated
