= 2017 Benin Premier League =

Benin Premier League
- Season: 2017
- Champions: Buffles du Borgou FC

The 2017 Benin Premier League (Championnat National de la Ligue 1) started on 8 July 2017.

== First round ==
The top three teams of each poule advance to the final round, while the bottom two (or three) are relegated.

=== Poule A ===
| Pos | Team | Pld | W | D | L | GF | GA | GD | Pts |
|---|---|---|---|---|---|---|---|---|---|
| 1 | Buffles du Borgou FC (Q) | 16 | 9 | 5 | 2 | 18 | 7 | +11 | 32 |
| 2 | Energie FC (Q) | 16 | 8 | 6 | 2 | 19 | 10 | +9 | 30 |
| 3 | ASPAC FC (Q) | 16 | 8 | 4 | 4 | 21 | 10 | +11 | 28 |
| 4 | Beke Bembereke | 16 | 7 | 7 | 2 | 18 | 10 | +8 | 28 |
| 5 | AS Police | 16 | 5 | 5 | 6 | 17 | 18 | −1 | 20 |
| 6 | Pantheres de Djougou | 16 | 6 | 2 | 8 | 22 | 26 | −4 | 20 |
| 7 | Dynamo FC d'Abomey | 16 | 4 | 3 | 9 | 9 | 19 | −10 | 15 |
| 8 | AS Tonnerre FC (R) | 16 | 2 | 6 | 8 | 15 | 21 | −6 | 12 |
| 9 | Jeunesse Sportive d'Agonlin (R) | 16 | 2 | 4 | 10 | 11 | 29 | −18 | 10 |

Updated to match(es) played on unknown. Source:
(Q) Qualified for the phase indicated; (R) Relegated

=== Poule B ===
| Pos | Team | Pld | W | D | L | GF | GA | GD | Pts |
|---|---|---|---|---|---|---|---|---|---|
| 1 | ESAE (Q) | 18 | 8 | 7 | 3 | 17 | 8 | +9 | 31 |
| 2 | AS Oussou Saka (Q) | 18 | 7 | 9 | 2 | 19 | 9 | +10 | 30 |
| 3 | JA Cotonou (Q) | 18 | 7 | 7 | 4 | 18 | 10 | +8 | 28 |
| 4 | Avrankou Omnisport | 18 | 7 | 6 | 5 | 9 | 10 | −1 | 27 |
| 5 | Union Sportive Sèmè Kraké | 18 | 7 | 5 | 6 | 14 | 14 | 0 | 26 |
| 6 | Soleil FC | 18 | 6 | 7 | 5 | 16 | 12 | +4 | 25 |
| 7 | Dragons de l'Ouémé FC | 18 | 6 | 6 | 6 | 10 | 9 | +1 | 24 |
| 8 | Ayéma d'Adjarra FC (R) | 18 | 4 | 8 | 6 | 12 | 17 | −5 | 20 |
| 9 | Requins de l'Atlantique (R) | 18 | 3 | 7 | 8 | 12 | 23 | −11 | 16 |
| 10 | Mambas Noirs (R) | 18 | 2 | 4 | 12 | 11 | 26 | −15 | 10 |

Updated to match(es) played on unknown. Source:
(Q) Qualified for the phase indicated; (R) Relegated

== Final round ==
Teams only play those of other group twice; head-to-head results from the initial group stage are not carried over.

1.Buffles du Borgou de Parakou (Borgou)        6   5  1  0  10- 3  16  Champions
2.Energie FC (Cotonou)                         6   4  0  2   7- 4  12
3.JA Cotonou                                   6   3  0  3   6- 6   9
4.ASPAC (Cotonou)                              6   1  2  3   5- 5   5
5.AS Oussou Saka (Porto-Novo)                  6   1  2  3   2- 6   5
6.ESAE                                         6   1  1  4   4-10   4
