= List of football clubs in Benin =

This is a list of football (soccer) clubs in Benin. For a complete list see Category:Football clubs in Benin

== A ==
- Adjobi Football Club
- Akanké FC
- AS Dragons FC de l'Ouémé
- ASPAC FC
- Avrankou Omnisport FC

== B ==
- Buffles du Borgou FC
- Dynamite force Benin city

== D ==
- Dynamo Abomey F.C.
- Dynamo Unacob FC de Parakou

== E ==
- Espoir FC (Benin football club)

== J ==
- Jeunesse Athlétique du Plateau

== M ==
- Mambas Noirs FC
- Mogas 90 FC

== P ==
- Panthères FC
- Police

== R ==
- Requins de l'Atlantique FC

== S ==
- Seme Krake
- Soleil FC

== T ==
- Tonnerre d'Abomey FC
