= 2023 U-20 Africa Cup of Nations squads =

International association football tournament squads

The 2023 U-20 Africa Cup of Nations was an international association football tournament held in Egypt. The twelve national teams involved in the tournament were required to register a squad of 21 players; only players in these squads were eligible to take part in the tournament. Each player had to have been born after 1 January 2003. All ages as of the start of the tournament. The squads for the 2023 U-20 Africa Cup of Nations were announced on 14 February 2023.

== Group A ==
=== Egypt ===
Egypt announced their squad of 26 players on 9 February 2023.

Head coach: Mahmoud Gaber

No.	Pos.	Player	Date of birth (age)	Club
1	GK	Ahmed Nader	16 June 2003 (aged 19)	(Portuguese Football Federation) Vizela
2	DF	Ahmed Reda	15 May 2003 (aged 19)	(Egyptian Football Association) Ghazl El Mahalla
3	MF	Tarek Alaa	1 January 2003 (aged 20)	(Egyptian Football Association) Zamalek
4	DF	Youssef Shaaban	4 May 2003 (aged 19)	(Egyptian Football Association) Pyramids
5	DF	Omar Fayed	4 July 2003 (aged 19)	(Egyptian Football Association) Al Mokawloon Al Arab
6	DF	Abdelrahman Rashdan	1 June 2003 (aged 19)	(Egyptian Football Association) Al Ahly
7	DF	Karim El Debes	3 June 2003 (aged 19)	(Egyptian Football Association) Al Ahly
8	MF	Ahmed Nader Hawash	14 February 2003 (aged 20)	(Egyptian Football Association) ENPPI
9	FW	Salah Basha	5 March 2003 (aged 19)	(Italian Football Federation) Giugliano
10	FW	Ahmed Sherif (captain)	26 July 2003 (aged 19)	(Egyptian Football Association) Pharco
11	FW	Youssef Hassan	20 June 2003 (aged 19)	(Egyptian Football Association) Zamalek
12	DF	Eyad El Askalany	24 December 2004 (aged 18)	(Egyptian Football Association) Ismaily
13	DF	Abdelrahman Gouda	5 February 2003 (aged 20)	(Egyptian Football Association) Pyramids
14	MF	Maged Hany	1 April 2003 (aged 19)	(Egyptian Football Association) Zamalek
15	MF	Mohamed Fares	1 January 2003 (aged 20)	(Egyptian Football Association) Al Ittihad
16	GK	Mostafa Makhlouf	1 January 2003 (aged 20)	(Egyptian Football Association) Al Ahly
17	MF	Omar El Saiy		(Egyptian Football Association) Ismaily
18	DF	Mahmoud Morsy	13 March 2003 (aged 19)	(Egyptian Football Association) Eastern Company
19	MF	Mohamed Hamdy	26 February 2003 (aged 19)	(Egyptian Football Association) ENPPI
20	MF	Ahmed Esho	3 March 2003 (aged 19)	(Egyptian Football Association) Zamalek
21	DF	Rafaat Khalil	3 February 2004 (aged 19)	(Egyptian Football Association) Al Ahly
22	DF	Khaled Awad	10 June 2003 (aged 19)	(Egyptian Football Association) Tala'ea El Gaish
23	GK	Karim Nabil	2 May 2003 (aged 19)	(Egyptian Football Association) Sporting Alexandria
24	FW	Bilal Mazhar	21 November 2003 (aged 19)	(Hellenic Football Federation) Panathinaikos
25	MF	Youssef El Azab	8 July 2003 (aged 19)	(Egyptian Football Association) Al Mokawloon Al Arab
26	DF	Islam Abdallah	18 April 2003 (aged 19)	(Egyptian Football Association) Al Ahly

=== Mozambique ===
Mozambique announced their squad of 23 players on 6 February 2023.

Head coach: Dário Monteiro

No.	Pos.	Player	Date of birth (age)	Club
1	GK	Fasistêncio João	9 June 2003 (aged 19)	(Mozambican Football Federation) Ferroviário de Nampula
2	DF	Atílio Henriques	5 August 2003 (aged 19)	(Mozambican Football Federation) Associação Black Bulls
3	DF	Edilson Nhabanga	7 October 2004 (aged 18)	(Mozambican Football Federation) Ferroviário de Maputo
4	DF	Aylton Zerefos	24 April 2003 (aged 19)	(Mozambican Football Federation) Associação Black Bulls
5	DF	António Langa	22 September 2003 (aged 19)	(Mozambican Football Federation) Costa do Sol
6	DF	Calilo Traoré	25 July 2004 (aged 18)	(Mozambican Football Federation) Ferroviário de Nampula
7	MF	Xamin Chalinda	25 February 2003 (aged 19)	(Mozambican Football Federation) Songo
8	MF	Zé Zavala	14 October 2003 (aged 19)	(Mozambican Football Federation) Associação Black Bulls
9	FW	Dénio Munhave	19 March 2002 (aged 20)	(Mozambican Football Federation) Ferroviário de Maputo
10	MF	António Sumbane	29 January 2004 (aged 19)	(Mozambican Football Federation) Ferroviário de Maputo
11	MF	Djwa Ramos	20 January 2004 (aged 19)	(Royal Spanish Football Federation) Torrent
12	GK	Kimiss Zavala	8 May 2004 (aged 18)	(Portuguese Football Federation) Marítimo
13	MF	Júlio Carrelo	8 January 2003 (aged 20)	(Mozambican Football Federation) Associação Black Bulls
14	MF	Leonel Calção	18 March 2003 (aged 19)	(Mozambican Football Federation) Associação Black Bulls
15	MF	Keyns Abdala (captain)	15 March 2003 (aged 19)	(Mozambican Football Federation) Liga Desportiva de Maputo
16	DF	Cleyd	14 February 2003 (aged 20)	(Mozambican Football Federation) Associação Black Bulls
17	MF	Edson Mucuana	12 December 2003 (aged 19)	(Portuguese Football Federation) Vilafranquense
18	FW	Ángelo Cantolo	23 May 2003 (aged 19)	(Mozambican Football Federation) Chingale de Tete
19	DF	Pene Simango	15 May 2003 (aged 19)	(Mozambican Football Federation) Liga Desportiva de Maputo
20	DF	Ezequiel Machava	2 January 2003 (aged 20)	(Mozambican Football Federation) Ferroviário de Maputo
21	FW	Chamito Alfândega	14 January 2004 (aged 19)	(Mozambican Football Federation) Têxtil do Púnguè
22	GK	Ananias Tembe	13 December 2003 (aged 19)	(Mozambican Football Federation) Liga Desportiva de Maputo
23	DF	Ivan Tropa	10 February 2003 (aged 20)	(Mozambican Football Federation) Textáfrica

=== Senegal ===
Senegal announced their squad of 26 players on 8 February 2023.

Head coach: Malick Daf

No.	Pos.	Player	Date of birth (age)	Club
1	GK	Alioune Niang	1 January 2003 (aged 20)	(Senegalese Football Federation) Linguère
2	MF	Mouhamed Guèye	16 November 2003 (aged 19)	(Senegalese Football Federation) US Gorée
3	MF	Djibril Diarra	30 April 2004 (aged 18)	(Senegalese Football Federation) Génération Foot
4	MF	Mamadou Lamine Camara	5 January 2003 (aged 20)	(Royal Moroccan Football Federation) RS Berkane
5	MF	Lamine Camara	1 January 2004 (aged 19)	(French Football Federation) Metz
6	DF	Souleymane Basse	6 November 2003 (aged 19)	(Senegalese Football Federation) Génération Foot
7	FW	Abdou Salam Ndoye	15 June 2004 (aged 18)	(Senegalese Football Federation) Espoirs de Guédiawaye
8	DF	Amidou Diop	8 March 2004 (aged 18)	(Senegalese Football Federation) Génération Foot
9	FW	Ibou Sané	28 March 2005 (aged 17)	(Senegalese Football Federation) Génération Foot
10	FW	Samba Diallo (captain)	5 January 2003 (aged 20)	(Ukrainian Association of Football) Dynamo Kyiv
11	MF	Mamadou Gning	22 December 2006 (aged 16)	(Senegalese Football Federation) Espoirs de Guédiawaye
12	DF	Babacar N'Diaye	25 October 2004 (aged 18)	(Senegalese Football Federation) AS Douanes
13	DF	Seydou Sano	27 October 2004 (aged 18)	(Senegalese Football Federation) US Gorée
14	MF	Libasse Ngom	4 December 2003 (aged 19)	(Senegalese Football Federation) Guédiawaye FC
15	MF	Ibrahima Cissoko	18 April 2003 (aged 19)	(Senegalese Football Federation) US Gorée
16	GK	Mamour N'diaye	22 October 2005 (aged 17)	(Senegalese Football Federation) Oslo FA
17	DF	Sadibou Sané	10 June 2004 (aged 18)	(Senegalese Football Federation) Génération Foot
18	DF	Mapenda Mbow	20 July 2004 (aged 18)	(Senegalese Football Federation) Espoirs de Guédiawaye
19	FW	Pape Amadou Diallo	25 June 2004 (aged 18)	(French Football Federation) Metz
20	MF	Pape Diop	4 September 2003 (aged 19)	(Royal Belgian Football Association) Zulte Waregem
21	MF	Ibrahima Seck	1 January 2004 (aged 19)	(Senegalese Football Federation) US Gorée
22	FW	Mame Faye	12 July 2005 (aged 17)	(Senegalese Football Federation) AF Darou Salam
23	GK	Landing Badji	21 September 2003 (aged 19)	(Senegalese Football Federation) AS Pikine
24	DF	Mouhamed Guèye	15 October 2003 (aged 19)	(Senegalese Football Federation) Diambars
25	DF	Mbaye N'diaye	21 March 2003 (aged 19)	(Senegalese Football Federation) Dakar Sacré-Cœur
26	FW	Souleymane Faye	8 February 2003 (aged 20)	(Royal Spanish Football Federation) Talavera de la Reina

=== Nigeria ===
Nigeria announced their squad of 21 players on 10 February 2023, with midfielders Musa Usman and Shatima Umar alongside forwards Kingsley James and Ayuba Abubakar being added as reserve players. On 14 February 2023, CAF confirmed the Nigeria's squad, with defender Michael Ologo being replaced by forward Ayuba Abubakar.

Head coach: Ladan Bosso

No.	Pos.	Player	Date of birth (age)	Club
1	GK	Nathaniel Nwosu	10 January 2006 (aged 17)	(Nigeria Football Federation) Water
2	DF	Augustine Njoku	2 August 2004 (aged 18)	(Nigeria Football Federation) Abia Warriors
3	DF	Solomon Agbalaka	9 November 2003 (aged 19)	(Nigeria Football Federation) Broad City
4	MF	Daniel Daga	10 January 2007 (aged 16)	(Nigeria Football Federation) Dakkada
5	DF	Abel Ogwuche	6 July 2003 (aged 19)	(Swedish Football Association) Trelleborgs FF
6	DF	Daniel Bameyi (captain)	4 January 2006 (aged 17)	(Nigeria Football Federation) Yum Yum
7	FW	Haliru Sarki	2 February 2004 (aged 19)	(Nigeria Football Federation) Mahanaim
8	MF	Nicholas Jonathan	5 May 2003 (aged 19)	(Nigeria Football Federation) Somiben
9	FW	Ahmed Abdullahi	19 June 2004 (aged 18)	(Royal Belgian Football Association) Gent
10	MF	Mohammed Aminu	11 July 2004 (aged 18)	(Nigeria Football Federation) Gombe United
11	FW	Ibrahim Muhammad	3 February 2004 (aged 19)	(Royal Spanish Football Federation) Cartagena
12	DF	Benjamin Fredrick	28 May 2005 (aged 17)	(Nigeria Football Federation) Nasarawa United
13	FW	Emmanuel Uchegbu	5 February 2005 (aged 18)	(Nigeria Football Federation) Plateau United
14	MF	Onuche Ogbelu	10 May 2003 (aged 19)	(Nigeria Football Federation) Nasarawa United
15	FW	Jude Sunday	4 October 2004 (aged 18)	(Nigeria Football Federation) Real Sapphire
16	GK	Saheed Akanbi	26 June 2005 (aged 17)	(Nigeria Football Federation) Adoration
17	FW	Ayuba Abubakar	7 June 2003 (aged 19)	(Nigeria Football Federation) Nasarawa United
18	MF	Samson Lawal	25 April 2004 (aged 18)	(Nigeria Football Federation) Pro Success Football Academy
19	FW	Olamilekan Adams	11 October 2004 (aged 18)	(Nigeria Football Federation) Remo Stars
20	MF	Caleb Ochedikwu	2 September 2005 (aged 17)	(Nigeria Football Federation) Mavlon
21	GK	Chijioke Aniagboso	15 April 2004 (aged 18)	(Nigeria Football Federation) Giant Brillars

== Group B ==
=== Uganda ===
Uganda announced a provisional squad of 50 players on 20 January 2023. The final squad of 25 players was announced on 11 February 2023.

Head coach: Jackson Mayanja

No.	Pos.	Player	Date of birth (age)	Club
1	GK	Shamulan Kamya	3 July 2004 (aged 18)	(Federation of Uganda Football Associations) Bright Stars FC
2	DF	Justine Opiro	28 December 2003 (aged 19)	(Federation of Uganda Football Associations) URA SC
3	FW	Alpha Ssali	29 December 2003 (aged 19)	(Federation of Uganda Football Associations) Proline FC
4	DF	Samson Kasozi	10 October 2003 (aged 19)	(Federation of Uganda Football Associations) Simba FC
5	DF	Rogers Torach	23 June 2003 (aged 19)	(Federation of Uganda Football Associations) Vipers SC
6	DF	Ronald Madoi	4 April 2004 (aged 18)	(Federation of Uganda Football Associations) Wakiso Giants FC
7	MF	Isma Mugulusi (captain)	10 October 2003 (aged 19)	(Hellenic Football Federation) Makedonikos
8	MF	Titus Ssematimba	15 August 2003 (aged 19)	(Federation of Uganda Football Associations) Wakiso Giants FC
9	FW	Emmanuel Mukisa	24 December 2003 (aged 19)	(Federation of Uganda Football Associations) Kataka FC
10	MF	Travis Mutyaba	7 August 2005 (aged 17)	(Federation of Uganda Football Associations) SC Villa
11	FW	Issa Bugembe	10 August 2004 (aged 18)	(Federation of Uganda Football Associations) Bright Stars FC
12	DF	Ibrahim Juma	6 May 2004 (aged 18)	(Royal Spanish Football Federation) Leganés
13	MF	Frank Katongole	8 December 2005 (aged 17)	(Federation of Uganda Football Associations) St Mary's SS
14	FW	John Paul Dembe	3 July 2005 (aged 17)	(Federation of Uganda Football Associations) KCCA
15	MF	Saidi Mayanja	12 August 2003 (aged 19)	(Federation of Uganda Football Associations) KCCA
16	DF	Umar Lutalo	15 December 2003 (aged 19)	(Federation of Uganda Football Associations) SC Villa
17	DF	Haruna Lukwago	6 November 2004 (aged 18)	(Federation of Uganda Football Associations) KCCA
18	GK	Abdu Magada	25 January 2005 (aged 18)	(Federation of Uganda Football Associations) Gaddafi FC
19	GK	Oyo Delton	24 November 2003 (aged 19)	(Federation of Uganda Football Associations) SC Villa
20	MF	Ivan Irinimbabazi	1 February 2004 (aged 19)	(Federation of Uganda Football Associations) Bright Stars FC
21	FW	Magogo Shafiq	15 March 2004 (aged 18)	(Federation of Uganda Football Associations) Simba FC
22	MF	Hakim Mutebi	6 January 2006 (aged 17)	(Federation of Uganda Football Associations) SC Villa
23	DF	Apollo Kakogwe	18 February 2003 (aged 20)	(Federation of Uganda Football Associations) Wakiso Giants FC
24	FW	Patrick Kakande	25 April 2003 (aged 19)	(Federation of Uganda Football Associations) SC Villa
25	FW	Rogers Mugisha	6 June 2003 (aged 19)	(Federation of Uganda Football Associations) Simba FC

=== Central African Republic ===
Central African Republic announced their squad of 25 players on 3 February 2023.

Head coach: Sébastien Ngato

No.	Pos.	Player	Date of birth (age)	Club
1	GK	Mauril Abimala	7 January 2004 (aged 19)	(Central African Football Federation) ORB
2	DF	Noah Ato-Zandanga	5 July 2003 (aged 19)	(Royal Spanish Football Federation) Santanyí
3	DF	Stéphane Kaimba	16 November 2004 (aged 18)	(Central African Football Federation) DFC8
4	DF	Veillance Gbamodo	16 May 2004 (aged 18)	(Central African Football Federation) EFC5
5	DF	Léonce Namgbema	23 April 2003 (aged 19)	(Central African Football Federation) Red Star Bangui
6	MF	Touré Mamfeina	20 November 2004 (aged 18)	(Central African Football Federation) TP USCA Bangui
7	FW	Ronaldo Ze	17 July 2006 (aged 16)	(Central African Football Federation) AS Gbangré
8	MF	Chadrack Djendo	15 December 2003 (aged 19)	(Central African Football Federation) DFC8
9	FW	Le Miséricordieu Ayoumbi	6 February 2003 (aged 20)	(Central African Football Federation) TP USCA Bangui
10	FW	Boris Gbenou	31 January 2004 (aged 19)	(Tunisian Football Federation) African Academy Élites
11	FW	Moustapha Djimet	12 June 2003 (aged 19)	(Central African Football Federation) Red Star Bangui
12	DF	Fanuel Koyakogue	28 November 2003 (aged 19)	(Central African Football Federation) AS Tempête Mocaf
13	MF	Messie Bangavoulou	25 December 2004 (aged 18)	(Ivorian Football Federation) Abidjan City
14	FW	Ephraim Alangakou	27 May 2003 (aged 19)	(Central African Football Federation) Anges de Fatima
15	DF	Rufus Betto	4 August 2003 (aged 19)	(Central African Football Federation) AS Tempête Mocaf
16	GK	Jordelain Ndoumbe	13 August 2006 (aged 16)	(Cameroonian Football Federation) Réal Foot Academy de Douala
17	FW	Juvénal Pouguy	4 January 2004 (aged 19)	(Central African Football Federation) Red Star Bangui
18	MF	Christin Banam-Ngonzo	1 May 2003 (aged 19)	(Romanian Football Federation) ACB Ineu
19	MF	Angelo Galabazi (captain)	25 September 2003 (aged 19)	(Central African Football Federation) DFC8
20	MF	Roméo Ouagolé	6 November 2003 (aged 19)	(Central African Football Federation) AS Gbangré
21	FW	Dieudonné Bondade	25 April 2004 (aged 18)	(Central African Football Federation) AS Tempête Mocaf
22	GK	Regis Konamna	10 September 2004 (aged 18)	(Central African Football Federation) EFC5
23	FW	Tony Biakolo	27 August 2006 (aged 16)	(French Football Federation) Toulouse
24	FW	Alban Goyema	1 November 2004 (aged 18)	(Gabonese Football Federation) US Bitam
25	MF	Wisdom Sogbodjo	30 December 2003 (aged 19)	(Central African Football Federation) RC3

=== South Sudan ===
South Sudan announced a provisional squad of 51 players on 16 January 2023. The final squad of 26 players was announced on 7 February 2023.

Head coach: Peter James

No.	Pos.	Player	Date of birth (age)	Club
1	GK	Dario Sallah	26 June 2004 (aged 18)	(South Sudan Football Association) Nyakuron FC
2	DF	Emmanuel Loboka	22 December 2004 (aged 18)	(South Sudan Football Association) Simba FC
3	DF	Bul James Anyang	11 November 2004 (aged 18)	(South Sudan Football Association) Al-Malakia
4	DF	Sarfino Lado	4 March 2003 (aged 19)	(South Sudan Football Association) Al Merreikh Juba
5	DF	Tutyian Juoch	2 April 2005 (aged 17)	(South Sudan Football Association) Simba FC
6	DF	Daniel John	25 August 2007 (aged 15)	(Football Kenya Federation) Nairobi United
7	MF	Tito Mayor	22 October 2004 (aged 18)	(South Sudan Football Association) Simba FC
8	MF	Kenyi Wani	26 March 2004 (aged 18)	(South Sudan Football Association) Al-Malakia
9	FW	Agumemboki Abishai	6 June 2004 (aged 18)	(South Sudan Football Association) Amarat United FC
10	MF	Lumumba Brown	15 November 2005 (aged 17)	(Federation of Uganda Football Associations) Calvary FC
11	MF	Silver Mabok	10 October 2005 (aged 17)	(South Sudan Football Association) Al-Hilal Juba
12	MF	Joseph Jele	7 July 2004 (aged 18)	(South Sudan Football Association) Munuki FC
13	DF	Mabior Achiek	29 December 2003 (aged 19)	(South Sudan Football Association) Super Star FC
14	FW	Ebon Wajo	23 March 2004 (aged 18)	(South Sudan Football Association) Jamus FC
15	MF	Mading Kau Nak	7 August 2006 (aged 16)	(South Sudan Football Association) Citizen FC
16	GK	Mayen Thon Aojok	15 February 2003 (aged 20)	(Football Australia) Western United
17	MF	Jacob Koal	26 April 2004 (aged 18)	(Football Kenya Federation) Sofapaka
18	MF	Thomas Feni	20 December 2004 (aged 18)	(South Sudan Football Association) Amarat United FC
19	MF	Kennedy Martin	3 July 2004 (aged 18)	(South Sudan Football Association) Mission FC
20	FW	Peter Aparer	5 February 2006 (aged 17)	(Federation of Uganda Football Associations) KCCA
21	MF	Ochaya Otim	11 November 2004 (aged 18)	(South Sudan Football Association) Simba FC
22	DF	George Rugi	3 January 2005 (aged 18)	(South Sudan Football Association) Citizen FC
23	GK	Godwill Sabio	23 July 2004 (aged 18)	(South Sudan Football Association) Kator FC
24	DF	Atiki Abiaza	25 October 2004 (aged 18)	(South Sudan Football Association) Amarat United FC
25	MF	Guet Duoth	31 March 2006 (aged 16)	(The Football Association) Brooke House Academy
26	FW	Paul Jawa	15 July 2004 (aged 18)	(Football Kenya Federation) Rainbow FC

=== Congo ===
Congo announced their squad of 26 players on 9 February 2023.

Head coach: Marie Joseph Madienguela

No.	Pos.	Player	Date of birth (age)	Club
1	GK	Christophe Wamba	16 September 2004 (aged 18)	(Congolese Football Federation) FC Racine
2	FW	Eddy Moutou	21 September 2003 (aged 19)	(Congolese Football Federation) AC Léopards
3	DF	Jacques Ndecket-Bowamba	16 September 2003 (aged 19)	(Congolese Football Federation) AS Otohô
4	DF	Belfegor Manouana	30 October 2003 (aged 19)	(Congolese Football Federation) Patronage Sainte-Anne
5	MF	Dieu-Le-Veut Ebengue	3 April 2005 (aged 17)	(Congolese Football Federation) Patronage Sainte-Anne
6	MF	Julio Ngandziami	2 July 2004 (aged 18)	(Congolese Football Federation) AS Otohô
7	MF	Exauce Nzaou	9 February 2003 (aged 20)	(Congolese Football Federation) JS Talangaï
8	FW	Josna Loulendo	15 January 2004 (aged 19)	(Congolese Football Federation) Étoile du Congo
9	FW	Déo Bassinga	11 August 2005 (aged 17)	(Congolese Football Federation) Diables Noirs
10	FW	Prince Soussou	25 May 2003 (aged 19)	(Congolese Football Federation) Diables Noirs
11	FW	Yedidya Oniangue	16 March 2004 (aged 18)	(French Football Federation) Columbiers
12	DF	Claude Ngongara	25 November 2004 (aged 18)	(Congolese Football Federation) Diables Noirs
13	DF	Samba Sarr	17 July 2004 (aged 18)	(Congolese Football Federation) TP Mokanda
14	MF	Jospin Loemba	4 August 2004 (aged 18)	(Congolese Football Federation) AS Otohô
15	FW	Guy-Cesar Nguesso	23 December 2003 (aged 19)	(French Football Federation) Metz
16	GK	Sayra Makoundou	25 January 2004 (aged 19)	(Congolese Football Federation) Vita Club Mokanda
17	DF	Arnauvy Mombouli	4 May 2004 (aged 18)	(Congolese Football Federation) Inter Club
18	MF	Davarel Diambomba	10 September 2003 (aged 19)	(Congolese Football Federation) FC Nathaly's
19	MF	Gédéon Nongo	27 December 2007 (aged 15)	(Congolese Football Federation) CARA Brazzaville
20	MF	Hergie Mossala	6 March 2003 (aged 19)	(Congolese Football Federation) Étoile du Congo
21	FW	Durma Maniongui	4 February 2005 (aged 18)	(Congolese Football Federation) JS Talangaï
22	DF	Djigo Saïkou	20 November 2004 (aged 18)	(Congolese Football Federation) AC Léopards
23	GK	Ruben Malonga	5 April 2004 (aged 18)	(Congolese Football Federation) AS BNG
24	DF	Roussel Ngoulou	16 August 2003 (aged 19)	(Congolese Football Federation) Étoile du Congo
25	DF	Isaac Odzeba	28 May 2004 (aged 18)	(Congolese Football Federation) Vita Club Mokanda
26	MF	Bonheur Ndeke	26 June 2005 (aged 17)	(French Football Federation) Metz

== Group C ==
=== Gambia ===
The Gambia announced their final squad of 25 players on 9 February 2023.

Head coach: Abdoulie Bojang

No.	Pos.	Player	Date of birth (age)	Club
1	GK	Pa Ebou Dampha	29 March 2003 (aged 19)	(Gambia Football Federation) Waa Banjul
2	DF	Ba Lamin Sowe	1 December 2003 (aged 19)	(Royal Spanish Football Federation) Tenerife
3	DF	Sainey Sanyang	18 April 2003 (aged 19)	(Gambia Football Federation) Hawks
4	DF	Alagie Saine (captain)	20 January 2003 (aged 20)	(Danish Football Association) Horsens
5	DF	Dembo Saidykhan	20 January 2004 (aged 19)	(Gambia Football Federation) Steve Biko
6	MF	Mahmudu Bajo	15 August 2004 (aged 18)	(Royal Spanish Football Federation) Granada
7	MF	Bailo Bah	4 March 2003 (aged 19)	(Gambia Football Federation) Hawks
8	FW	Salifu Colley	13 October 2003 (aged 19)	(Gambia Football Federation) Real de Banjul
9	FW	Mansour Mbye	1 January 2003 (aged 20)	(Gambia Football Federation) Banjul United
10	MF	Kajally Drammeh	10 October 2003 (aged 19)	(South African Football Association) Cape Town City
11	FW	Ismaila Manneh	2 February 2004 (aged 19)	(Gambia Football Federation) Steve Biko
12	MF	Momodou Salieu Jallow	9 January 2004 (aged 19)	(Gambia Football Federation) Waa Banjul
13	MF	Haruna Rasid Njie	23 September 2005 (aged 17)	(Gambia Football Federation) Gunjur United
14	MF	Muhammed Sawaneh	30 December 2003 (aged 19)	(Senegalese Football Federation) Teungueth
15	DF	Moses Jarju	5 October 2003 (aged 19)	(Gambia Football Federation) Fortune
16	DF	Bakary Jawara	2 April 2003 (aged 19)	(Gambia Football Federation) Fortune
17	MF	Alieu Gibba	6 January 2004 (aged 19)	(Gambia Football Federation) Real de Banjul
18	GK	Ebrima Jaiteh	19 December 2004 (aged 18)	(Gambia Football Federation) TMT FA
19	FW	Ebrima Singhateh	10 September 2003 (aged 19)	(Football Association of the Czech Republic) Slavia Prague
20	FW	Adama Bojang	28 May 2004 (aged 18)	(Gambia Football Federation) Steve Biko
21	FW	Mamin Sanyang	6 February 2003 (aged 20)	(German Football Association) Bayern Munich II
22	GK	Youkasseh Sanyang	6 January 2004 (aged 19)	(Gambia Football Federation) Steve Biko
23	MF	Muhammed Jobe	26 May 2004 (aged 18)	(Gambia Football Federation) Real de Banjul
24	DF	Mamadou Bah	5 December 2003 (aged 19)	(Gambia Football Federation) Team Rhino
25	FW	Modou Lamin Marong	27 November 2005 (aged 17)	(Angolan Football Federation) Interclube

=== Tunisia ===
Tunisia announced their final squad of 26 players on 8 February 2023.

Head coach: Adel Sellimi

No.	Pos.	Player	Date of birth (age)	Club
1	GK	Amenallah Memmiche	20 April 2004 (aged 18)	(Tunisian Football Federation) Espérance de Tunis
2	DF	Mahmoud Ghorbel	31 December 2003 (aged 19)	(Tunisian Football Federation) Club Sfaxien
3	DF	Zinedine Sassi	4 August 2003 (aged 19)	(Tunisian Football Federation) Espérance de Tunis
4	DF	Makrem Sghaier	13 April 2004 (aged 18)	(Tunisian Football Federation) Club Africain
5	DF	Mohamed Amine Kechiche	12 January 2003 (aged 20)	(Tunisian Football Federation) Étoile du Sahel
6	MF	Ghaith Ouahabi	2 May 2003 (aged 19)	(Tunisian Football Federation) Espérance de Tunis
7	FW	Aziz Abid	3 April 2003 (aged 19)	(Tunisian Football Federation) Espérance de Tunis
8	MF	Yassine Dridi	3 April 2003 (aged 19)	(Tunisian Football Federation) Club Africain
9	FW	Youssef Snana	24 March 2004 (aged 18)	(Tunisian Football Federation) Club Africain
10	FW	Adem Garreb	22 May 2003 (aged 19)	(Tunisian Football Federation) Club Africain
11	FW	Hedi Jertila	29 May 2003 (aged 19)	(Tunisian Football Federation) Étoile du Sahel
12	DF	Dhia Eddine Chihi	10 July 2003 (aged 19)	(Tunisian Football Federation) Club Africain
13	MF	Wael Derbali	18 June 2003 (aged 19)	(Tunisian Football Federation) Olympique Béja
14	DF	Rayan Nasraoui	27 June 2003 (aged 19)	(French Football Federation) Nîmes
15	FW	Baraket Hmidi	1 February 2003 (aged 20)	(Tunisian Football Federation) Club Sfaxien
16	GK	Raed Gazzeh	17 October 2003 (aged 19)	(Tunisian Football Federation) Étoile du Sahel
17	MF	Malek Mehri	21 October 2003 (aged 19)	(Tunisian Football Federation) Espérance de Tunis
18	FW	Mohamed Dhaoui	14 May 2003 (aged 19)	(Egyptian Football Association) Al Ahly
19	DF	Ali Saoudi	20 December 2003 (aged 19)	(Tunisian Football Federation) Stade Tunisien
20	DF	Fradj Ben Njima	23 January 2004 (aged 19)	(Tunisian Football Federation) Étoile du Sahel
21	FW	Jibril Othman	26 April 2004 (aged 18)	(French Football Federation) Saint-Étienne
22	GK	Mohamed Bechir Abbassi	4 January 2003 (aged 20)	(Tunisian Football Federation) Union de Ben Guerdane
23	MF	Mohamed Adem Ouertani	20 February 2003 (aged 19)	(Tunisian Football Federation) Étoile du Sahel
24	DF	Amenallah Majhed	18 July 2003 (aged 19)	(Tunisian Football Federation) Espérance de Tunis
25	MF	Samy Chouchane	5 September 2003 (aged 19)	(The Football Association) Brighton & Hove Albion
26	MF	Chaïm El Djebali	7 February 2004 (aged 19)	(French Football Federation) Lyon

=== Benin ===
Benin announced a squad of 26 players on 24 January 2023, which was later confirmed by CAF as Benin's final squad with a single change, defender René Akakpo being replaced by Sèwanou Winsavi.

Head coach: Mathias Déguénon

No.	Pos.	Player	Date of birth (age)	Club
1	GK	David Agossa	13 May 2003 (aged 19)	(Djiboutian Football Federation) Gendarmerie Nationale
2	DF	Samson Gouakinnou	5 January 2004 (aged 19)	(Benin Football Federation) Dynamo Abomey
3	MF	Femy Monladé	23 December 2004 (aged 18)	(Benin Football Federation) Takunin
4	DF	Sèwanou Winsavi	24 August 2003 (aged 19)	(Benin Football Federation) Espoir
5	MF	Maboumou Allassane	2 October 2003 (aged 19)	(Benin Football Federation) Coton
6	DF	Tamimou Ouorou (captain)	3 May 2003 (aged 19)	(Benin Football Federation) ASPAC
7	FW	Farid Edou	6 April 2003 (aged 19)	(Benin Football Federation) Dadjè FC
8	MF	Dodo Dokou	4 May 2004 (aged 18)	(Egyptian Football Association) Smouha
9	FW	Olatoundji Tessilimi	2 November 2004 (aged 18)	(Benin Football Federation) Ayema FC
10	MF	Rodolfo Aloko	26 December 2006 (aged 16)	(Benin Football Federation) Dynamo Abomey
11	DF	Bachirou Attivi	19 December 2003 (aged 19)	(Benin Football Federation) Eternel
12	DF	Rabiou Sankamao	12 October 2003 (aged 19)	(Benin Football Federation) ASPAC
13	DF	Kader Malik	25 June 2003 (aged 19)	(Benin Football Federation) Damissa
14	MF	Samadou Attidjikou	2 February 2004 (aged 19)	(Benin Football Federation) Bani Gansè
15	MF	Hassane Imourane	8 April 2003 (aged 19)	(Benin Football Federation) Loto-Popo
16	GK	Rahman Karim	13 August 2005 (aged 17)	(Benin Football Federation) Dadjè FC
17	DF	Morile Dossou-Dognon	25 February 2003 (aged 19)	(Benin Football Federation) ASVO FC
18	FW	Zoulkanéri Seibou		(Benin Football Federation) Loto-Popo
19	FW	Djalilou Ibrahim	19 March 2003 (aged 19)	(Benin Football Federation) USS Kraké
20	FW	Samidou Bawa		(Benin Football Federation) Dragons de l'Ouémé
21	GK	Salas Fossou	5 May 2005 (aged 17)	(Benin Football Federation) Ayema FC
22	FW	Rivaldo Alitonou	15 May 2003 (aged 19)	(Benin Football Federation) Coton
23	MF	Malick Tongui	29 December 2003 (aged 19)	(Ivorian Football Federation) LYS FC Sassandra
24	FW	Stéphane Vignigbe	15 February 2003 (aged 20)	(Benin Football Federation) ASVO FC
25	DF	Rachid Moumini	27 October 2004 (aged 18)	(Benin Football Federation) Ayema FC
26	DF	Cyrille Aloya	18 December 2003 (aged 19)	(Benin Football Federation) Dragons de l'Ouémé

=== Zambia ===
Zambia announced a squad of 25 players on 1 February 2023, which was later confirmed by CAF as Zambia's final squad. However, on 18 February 2023, the Football Association of Zambia announced a final list reduced to 21 players with midfielder Joseph Sabobo Banda being withdrawn due to injury and defender Luckson Tembo, midfielder Moses Mulenga and forward Henry Mbuti being ruled out.

Head coach: Chisi Mbewe

No.	Pos.	Player	Date of birth (age)	Club
1	GK	Levison Banda	6 March 2005 (aged 17)	(Football Association of Zambia) ZESCO United
2	DF	Lombe Mutale	28 March 2004 (aged 18)	(Football Association of Zambia) Power Dynamos
3	DF	Amon Chulu	1 May 2005 (aged 17)	(Football Association of Zambia) Nkana
4	DF	Happy Nsiku	1 March 2005 (aged 17)	(Football Association of Zambia) Red Arrows
5	DF	Onesmus Chipango	4 November 2004 (aged 18)	(Football Association of Zambia) Shamuel Soccer Academy
6	MF	Dominic Kanda (captain)	30 November 2004 (aged 18)	(Football Association of Zambia) Shamuel Soccer Academy
8	MF	Ian Sindaye	23 May 2004 (aged 18)	(Football Association of Zambia) Roan United
9	FW	Rickson Ng'ambi	20 December 2004 (aged 18)	(Football Association of Zambia) MUZA
10	MF	Songa Chipyoka	28 September 2004 (aged 18)	(Football Association of Zambia) ZESCO United
12	FW	Kingstone Mutandwa	5 January 2003 (aged 20)	(Football Association of Zambia) Atletico Lusaka
13	MF	Lasmond Phiri	18 April 2004 (aged 18)	(Football Association of Zambia) Blaze FC Academy
14	MF	Charles Mumba	17 April 2004 (aged 18)	(Football Association of Zambia) Atletico Lusaka
15	DF	Mathews Banda	6 August 2005 (aged 17)	(Football Association of Zambia) Kafue Celtic
16	GK	Jeban Tembo	31 January 2003 (aged 20)	(Football Association of Zambia) Kafue Celtic
17	MF	Julius Kumwenda	22 October 2004 (aged 18)	(Football Association of Zambia) Atletico Lusaka
18	MF	Emmanuel Mukosha	3 August 2003 (aged 19)	(Football Association of Zambia) Green Eagles
19	DF	Gift Mphande	12 February 2003 (aged 20)	(Football Association of Zambia) Atletico Lusaka
20	FW	Derrick Bulaya	8 March 2003 (aged 19)	(Football Association of Zambia) Green Eagles
22	GK	Eric Makungu	21 June 2005 (aged 17)	(Football Association of Zambia) Shamuel Soccer Academy
24	MF	Peter Chikola	24 January 2003 (aged 20)	(Croatian Football Federation) Gorica
25	FW	Richard Ngoma	29 July 2004 (aged 18)	(Israel Football Association) Maccabi Netanya
