= Benin Cup =

The Benin Cup is the top knockout tournament of the Beninese football. It was created in 1974.

== Winners ==
- 1974 : Etoile Sportive Porto-Novo
- 1975–1977 no Cup
- 1978 : Requins de l'Atlantique FC (Cotonou)
- 1979 : Buffles du Borgou (Parakou)
- 1980 : no Cup
- 1981 : Requins de l'Atlantique FC (Cotonou)
- 1982 : Buffles du Borgou (Parakou) 2–1 Université Nationale du Bénin FC
- 1983 : Requins de l'Atlantique FC (Cotonou)
- 1984 : Dragons de l'Ouémé (Porto Novo)
- 1985 : Dragons de l'Ouémé (Porto Novo)
- 1986 : Dragons de l'Ouémé (Porto Novo)
- 1987 : no Cup
- 1988 : Requins de l'Atlantique FC (Cotonou)
- 1989 : Requins de l'Atlantique FC (Cotonou) 3–0 ASMAP
- 1990 : Dragons de l'Ouémé (Porto Novo)
- 1991 : Mogas 90 FC (Porto Novo)
- 1992 : Mogas 90 FC (Porto Novo) 1–1 Dragons de l'Ouémé (5–4 pen.)
- 1993 : Locomotive Cotonou 0–0 Postel Sport (4–3 pen.)
- 1994 : Mogas 90 FC (Porto Novo)
- 1995 : Mogas 90 FC (Porto Novo) 2–1 Toffa Cotonou
- 1996 : Université Nationale du Bénin FC (Porto Novo) 1–0 Requins de l'Atlantique FC (Cotonou)
- 1997 : Energie FC (Cotonou) 0–0 Entente Force Armée (9–8 pen.)
- 1998 : Mogas 90 FC (Porto Novo) 1–0 Dragons de l'Ouémé
- 1999 : Mogas 90 FC (Porto Novo)
- 2000 : Mogas 90 FC (Porto Novo) 1–0 Buffles du Borgou (Parakou)
- 2001 : Buffles du Borgou (Parakou) 1–0 Dragons de l'Ouémé (Porto Novo)
- 2002 : Jeunesse Sportive Pobé 0–0 1–1 Mogas 90 FC (Porto Novo) (4–3 pen.)
- 2003 : Mogas 90 FC (Porto Novo) 1–0 (a.e.t.) Soleil FC
- 2004 : Mogas 90 FC (Porto Novo) 1–0 Requins de l'Atlantique FC(Cotonou)
- 2005 : unknown winner
- 2006 : Dragons de l'Ouémé (Porto Novo) 0–0 2–0 Mogas 90 FC (Porto Novo)
- 2007 : Université Nationale du Bénin FC (Porto Novo) 2–0 Association Sportive Oussou Saka (Porto-Novo)
- 2008 : ASPAC FC (Cotonou) 1–0 Dadjè FC
- 2009 : not known if played
- 2010 : not known if played
- 2011 : Dragons de l'Ouémé (Porto Novo) 2–1 Association Sportive Oussou Saka (Porto-Novo)
- 2012 : Mogas 90 FC (Porto Novo) 3–0 Dragons de l'Ouémé
- 2013 : not played (Coupe de l'Indépendance played by regional sides)
- 2014 : AS Police 2–2 (4–3 pen.) Ayema FC
- 2019 : ESAE 2–1 ASPAC FC

== Number of Wins ==
#	Team	Titles	Years
1	Mogas 90	10	1991, 1992, 1994, 1995, 1998, 1999, 2000, 2003, 2004, 2012
2	Dragons de l'Ouémé	6	1984, 1985, 1986, 1990, 2006, 2011
3	Requins de l'Atlantique	5	1978, 1981, 1983, 1988, 1989
4	Buffles du Borgou	3	1979, 1982, 2001
5	UNB	2	1996, 2007
6.	Energie	1	1997
6.	Etoile Sportive Porto-Novo	1	1974
6.	Jeunesse Sportive Pobè	1	2002
6.	Locomotive	1	1992
6.	ASPAC	1	2008
6.	ESAE	1	2019
