= Football in Benin =

- Governing body: Benin Football Federation
- National team: national football team

Club competitions
- Benin Premier League

International competitions
- Champions League; CAF Confederation Cup; Super Cup; FIFA Club World Cup; FIFA World Cup(National Team); African Cup of Nations(National Team)

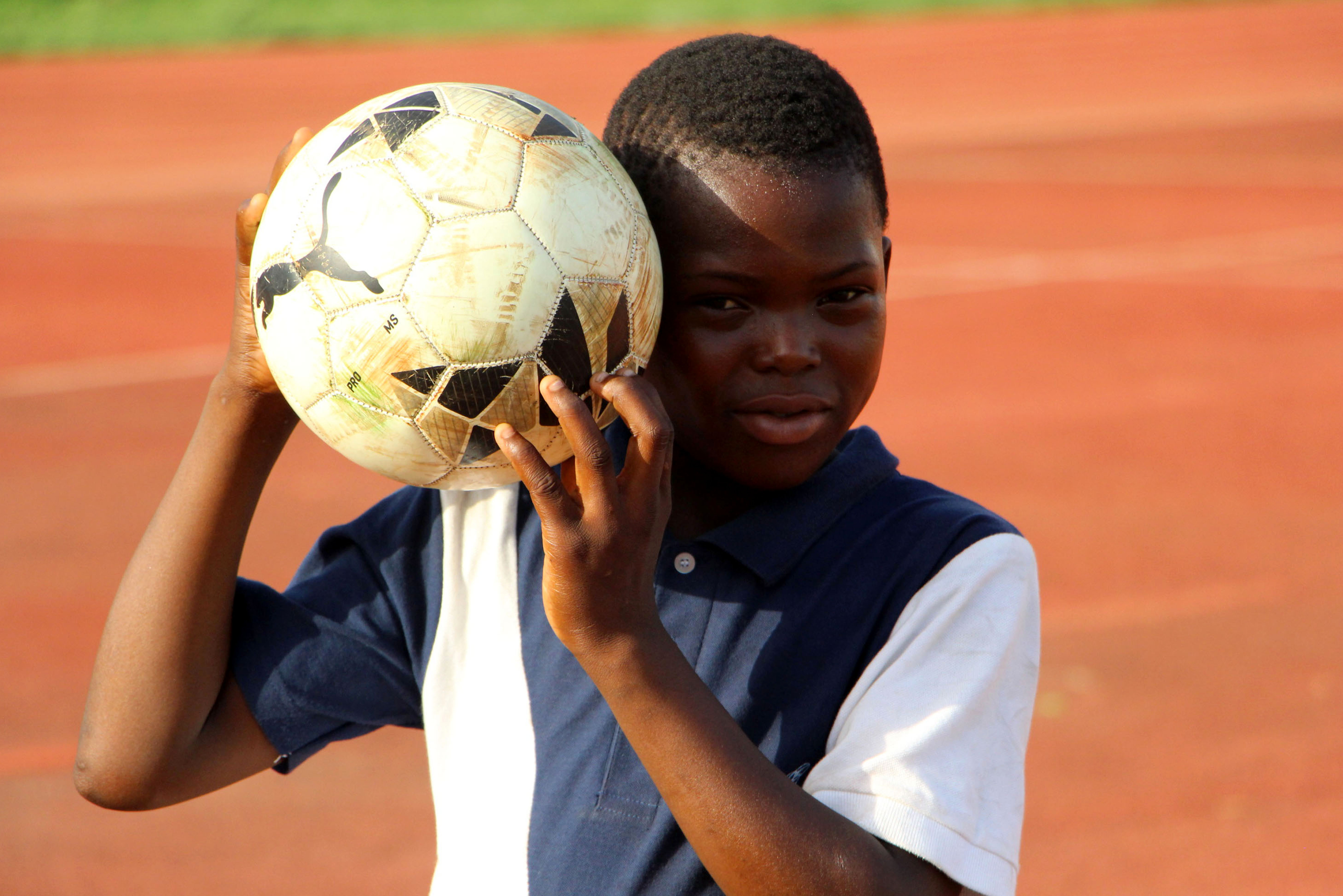
A young Beninese football player

Association football, or soccer, is the most popular sport in Benin. Approximately 40% of the people in Benin are interested in football.

Governed by the Benin Football Federation, the Benin national football team (Les Ecureuils ) joined both FIFA and CAF in 1969 as Dahomey. Dahomey became Benin in 1975.

== Les Ecureuils ==
Les Ecureuils (The Squirrels, as the national squad is nicknamed) have never qualified for the World Cup and made their only appearance in the African Cup of Nations in 2004. They enjoyed their highest world ranking as of September 2007 with a rank of 79th in the world. The home stadium is Stade de l'Amitié in Cotonou. On August 22nd 2022, the national team nickname was changed to the Cheetahs.

== Notable Beninese footballers ==
- Romuald Boco
- Laurent D'Jaffo
- Moussa Latoundji
- Stéphane Sessègnon
- Rudy Gestede

== Football stadiums in Benin ==
The Stade de l'Amitié is currently the largest stadium by capacity in Benin. It is used by the national football team of Benin.

#	Stadium	City	Capacity	Tenants	Image
1	Stade de l'Amitié	Cotonou	20,000	Benin national football team	
2	Stade Charles de Gaulle	Porto-Novo	15,000	AS Dragons FC de l'Ouémé	
3	Stade René Pleven d'Akpakpa	Cotonou	15,000	Requins de l'Atlantique FC	

== Attendances ==
The average attendance per top-flight football league season and the club with the highest average attendance:

Season	League average	Best club	Best club average
2022-23	350	Coton	843

Source: League page on Wikipedia

== See also ==
- Lists of stadiums
