= Alain Hounsa =

Beninese footballer

Personal information
- Full name: Idelphonse Alain Hounsa
- Date of birth: 23 February 1988 (age 38)
- Height: 1.69 m (5 ft 7 in)
- Position: Midfielder

Team information
- Current team: Ayema FC

Senior career*
Years	Team	Apps	(Gls)
2003	JA Missérété		
2004	Dragons de l'Ouémé		
2005–2006	Énergie SBEÉ Cotonou		
2007–2009	AS Oussou Saka		
2009–2012	USS Kraké		
2012–2013	AS Oussou Saka		
2013–2015	Ayema FC		
2016–2017	AS Oussou Saka		
2018–	Ayema FC		

International career
2011	Benin	2	(0)
- * Club domestic league appearances and goals

Alain Hounsa (born 23 February 1988) is a Beninese football midfielder who plays for Ayema FC.
