= Mathias Déguénon =

Beninese football manager

Personal information
- Full name: Mathias Comlan Déguénon
- Place of birth: Benin

Team information
- Current team: AS Sobemap (head coach)

Senior career*
Years	Team	Apps	(Gls)
- Université Nationale du Bénin FC

Managerial career
- 2016: Benin U20
- 2018–2020: Energie FC
- 2021: Loto-Popo FC
- 2021–2024: Benin U20
- 2023: Loto-Popo FC
- 2024–: AS Sobemap
- * Club domestic league appearances and goals

Mathias Comlan Déguénon is a Beninese football manager and former player who is the head coach of AS Sobemap, a club affiliated with the Société béninoise des manutentions portuaires and which currently plays in the Celtiis Ligue 1, the highest division of football in Benin.

He has won the top-tier of Beninese football twice with different clubs. In 2021, Déguénon was the head coach of Loto-Popo Football Club when they won the league. He was the head coach of AS Sobemap when the club won the 2025–26 season.

== Playing career ==
Déguénon played football with Université Nationale du Bénin Football Club, a team based in Porto-Novo, while he was attending the Institut national de la jeunesse et de l'éducation physique et sportive. He later retired from playing due to an injury.

== Managerial career ==
=== Early career ===
He was an assistant coach for Association Sportive Oussou Saka and previously worked for Ayema Football Club. In 2012, Déguénon led the technical staff at Union Sportive Seme Kraké.

=== Benin U20 ===
Déguénon was an assistant to Ulrich Alohoutadé, the head coach of the Benin U20 national football team in 2013.

He first became the head coach of the team in 2016.

He was appointed head coach of the Bénin U20 national football team in May 2021. He coached the team at the 2023 U-20 Africa Cup of Nations. In 2024, his tenure as head coach of the team ended after he became the head coach of AS Sobemap.

=== Benin A ===
Déguénon became head coach of the Benin A national football team, which is composed of domestic league players, in 2016. He was the manager during the 2016 UEMOA Tournament.

=== Energie FC ===
Déguénon was appointed the head coach of Energie Football Club in 2018, replacing Stanislas Akélé.

=== Loto-Popo FC ===
Loto-Popo Football Club was founded in 2021 and succeeded the former ESAE FC. Déguénon was appointed head coach of Loto-Popo Football Club the same year. He won his first trophy with the club when the team won the 2020–21 season which began in January 2021. After Abdeslam Ouaddou joined the club Déguénon became the assistant manager. He was dismissed as assistant manager in 2022. He later became the head coach following the departure of Ouaddou in 2023. He was replaced as head coach by Saturnin Ibela on 27 September 2023.

=== AS Sobemap ===
In July 2024, Déguénon was appointed as the head coach of the Association Sportive de la Société Béninoise des Manutentions Portuaires, a team affiliated with the Société béninoise des manutentions portuaires and popularly known as the Manutentionnaires. He was the manager when the club won the 2025–26 season.

== Honors ==
=== Loto-Popo FC ===
Benin Premier League: 2020–21

=== AS Sobemap ===
Benin Premier League: 2025–26
