= Djalilou Ouorou =

Beninese footballer

Personal information
- Full name: Tchagnirou Abdoul Djalilou Ouorou
- Date of birth: 18 July 1997 (age 29)
- Place of birth: Djougou, Benin
- Height: 1.72 m (5 ft 8 in)
- Position: Left back

Team information
- Current team: Buffles du Borgou

Senior career*
Years	Team	Apps	(Gls)
2014–2015	Dragons de l'Ouémé		
2016	ASPAC		
2017–2019	JA Cotonou		
2019–	Buffles du Borgou		

International career^{‡}
2019–	Benin	3	(0)
- * Club domestic league appearances and goals as of 22:24, 8 June 2021 (UTC) ‡ National team caps and goals as of 22:24, 8 June 2021 (UTC)

Tchagnirou Abdoul Djalilou Ouorou (born 18 July 1997) is a Beninese footballer who plays as a left back for Buffles du Borgou and the Benin national football team.

== Career statistics ==
=== International ===
Appearances and goals by national team and year
National team	Year	Apps	Goals
Benin	2019	2	0
Benin	2020	–	
Benin	2021	1	0
Total		3	0
