= Armand Djérabé =

Chadian footballer (born 1980)

Personal information
- Date of birth: 11 September 1980 (age 46)
- Place of birth: N'Djamena, Chad
- Height: 1.81 m (5 ft 11 in)
- Position: Left-back

Team information
- Current team: CotonTchad
- Number: 8

Senior career*
Years	Team	Apps	(Gls)
2000–2003	Gazelle		
2004–2006	Cotonsport Garoua		
2007–2009	Lions de l'Atakory		
2010	Requins de l'Atlantique		
2010	Gazelle		
2011–2013	Tourbillon		
2013–2015	Foullah Edifice		
2015–	CotonTchad		

International career^{‡}
2002–2011	Chad	31	(0)
- * Club domestic league appearances and goals as of 1 September 2015 ‡ National team caps and goals as of 1 September 2015

Armand Djérabé (born 11 September 1980 in N'Djamena) is a Chadian footballer who plays for CotonTchad.

== Career ==
Djérabé has played in Cameroon for Cotonsport Garoua and three years for Lions de l'Atakory. He played the 2010 season for Requins de l'Atlantique FC in the Benin Premier League and returned in summer 2010 to Chad where signed with Gazelle FC. After Gazelle, he played for Tourbillon, and Foullah Edifice. Now he plays for CotonTchad

== International career ==
Djerabe was a member of the Chad national football team and played in the 2006 and 2010 FIFA World Cup qualifying rounds, as well as the 2012 Africa Cup of Nations qualifying rounds. He played for the side that finished runners-up at the 2005 CEMAC Cup. He has 31 FIFA official caps and 3 non-FIFA caps for Chad. So far, his last match for national team was on 11 November 2011 against Tanzania.
