= Steve Glodjinon =

Beninese footballer

Personal information
- Date of birth: 18 December 1993 (age 32)
- Place of birth: Dangbo, Benin
- Height: 1.80 m (5 ft 11 in)
- Position: Goalkeeper

Team information
- Current team: JA Cotonou

Senior career*
| Years | Team | Apps | (Gls) |
| 2012–2013 | USS Kraké | | |
| 2013–2015 | Energie | | |
| 2016– | JA Cotonou | | |

International career^{‡}
| 2017– | Benin | 8 | (0) |
- * Club domestic league appearances and goals as of 14:35, 10 December 2017 (UTC) ‡ National team caps and goals as of 14:35, 10 December 2017 (UTC)

Steve Glodjinon (born 18 December 1993) is a Beninese international footballer who plays for JA Cotonou, as a goalkeeper.
