= Bio Aï Traoré =

Beninese footballer (born 1985)

Personal information
- Date of birth: 9 June 1985 (age 41)
- Place of birth: Porto-Novo, Benin
- Height: 1.84 m (6 ft 0 in)
- Position: Defender

Youth career
- 2002–2005: Panthères FC

Senior career*
Years	Team	Apps	(Gls)
2006–2007	Panthères FC		
2008–2010	East Riffa Club		
2010–2012	Les Buffles du Borgou		

International career
2007–2009	Benin	2	(0)
- * Club domestic league appearances and goals

Bio Aï Traoré (born 9 June 1985) is a Beninese former professional footballer who played as a defender. He made two appearances for the Benin national team.

== Club career ==
Traoré began to play for Panthères FC who are based in Djougou.

== International career ==
Traoré first called up was for the 2010 FIFA World Cup qualification against Uganda national football team on 12 October 2008.
