= Valère Amoussou =

Beninese footballer (born 1987)

Personal information
- Date of birth: 17 May 1986 (age 40)
- Place of birth: Cotonou, Benin
- Height: 1.83 m (6 ft 0 in)
- Position: Goalkeeper

Youth career
- 2005–2006: Mogas 90 FC

Senior career*
Years	Team	Apps	(Gls)
2007	Mogas 90 FC		
2008–2011	AS Porto-Novo		
2011–2016	Mogas 90 FC		

International career
2008	Benin	1	(0)
- * Club domestic league appearances and goals

Valère Amoussou (born 10 March 1987) is a Beninese former footballer who played as a goalkeeper.

== Career ==
Amoussou was born in Cotonou. He began his career with Mogas 90 FC and joined in January 2008 to AS Porto-Novo.

He was part of the Beninese 2008 African Nations Cup team, who finished bottom of their group in the first round of competition, thus failing to qualify for the next round. Amoussou played his first game on 29 January 2008 against Nigeria. and his first call was in 2006.
