= Tchomogo =

Tchomogo is a surname. Notable people with the surname include:

- Oumar Tchomogo (born 1978), Beninese footballer
- Séïdath Tchomogo (born 1985), Beninese footballer
