= Abdoul Rachid Moumini =

Beninese footballer (born 1992)

Personal information
- Date of birth: 27 October 2004 (age 22)
- Place of birth: Porto-Novo, Benin
- Height: 1.67 m (5 ft 6 in)
- Position: Right-back

Team information
- Current team: Sumgayit
- Number: 25

Senior career*
Years	Team	Apps	(Gls)
2022–2025	Ayema		
2025–	Sumgayit	18	(0)

International career^{‡}
2023	Benin U20	3	(0)
2023–	Benin	22	(1)
- * Club domestic league appearances and goals as of 22 June 2026 ‡ National team caps and goals as of 23:55, 21 December 2025 (UTC)

Abdoul Rachid Moumini (born 27 October 2004) is a Beninese professional footballer who plays as a right-back for Azerbaijan Premier League club Sumgayit and the Benin national team.

== Club career ==
Moumini began his senior career in the Benin Premier League with Ayema. On 3 August 2025, he transferred to the Azerbaijan Premier League club Sumgayit.

== International career ==
Moumini was called up to the Benin U20s by Mathias Déguénon for the 2023 U-20 Africa Cup of Nations. He made the senior Benin national team for the 2025 Africa Cup of Nations.
