= Rachad Chitou =

Beninese footballer (born 1976)

Personal information
- Date of birth: 18 September 1976 (age 50)
- Place of birth: Benin
- Position: Goalkeeper

Senior career*
Years	Team	Apps	(Gls)
2002–2006	Dragons de l'Ouémé		
2006–2007	Heart of Lions		
2007–2011	Wikki Tourists		

International career
1996–2010	Benin	38	(2)

Managerial career
- Avrankou Omnisport
- * Club domestic league appearances and goals

Rachad Chitou (born 18 September 1976) is a Beninese former professional footballer who played as a goalkeeper.

== Club career ==
Chitou began playing football with local side AS Dragons FC de l'Ouémé before spells abroad in Ghana and Nigeria.

== International career ==
Chitou was part of the Beninese 2004 African Nations Cup team, who finished bottom of their group in the first round of competition, thus failing to qualify for the next round.

== Managerial career ==
After he retired from playing, Chitou was a football analysts and received a coaching license. Next, he managed local side Avrankou Omnisport FC.
