= French West African Cup =

Football tournament

The French West African Cup or Coupe d'Afrique Occidentale Française was a football tournament between clubs of the former French Western African territories.

This area comprised the current states of Benin (then Dahomey), Burkina Faso (then Haute-Volta), Guinea (Guinée), Ivory Coast (Côte d'Ivoire), Mali (then Soudan), Mauritania (Mauritanie), Niger and Senegal (Sénégal). The current Togo was not part of the A.O.F. but its clubs gained entrance to the tournament during the last five editions (first in 1955/56).

The Ligue d'AOF de Foot-Ball was created in March 1946 in Dakar. The only French Western African territory which refused to enter was Mauritania. The organisation was officially affiliated to the FFF (French FA) in 1951.

The Coupe d'AOF was created in 1947, when the president of the Ligue d'AOF, Mr. Barat, received a trophy from the FFF. He immediately announced a competition for the trophy, a Coupe du Sénégal, for clubs from the "4 communes du Sénégal", Dakar, Gorée, Rufisque and Saint-Louis. Sixteen clubs from these towns, all in current Senegal, entered the first round (1/8 finals) of the competition, played early April 1947. On 17 April, a new weekly sports magazine, "Afriqu'Sports", appeared in Dakar, referring to the competition as "Coupe d'AOF". This name was eventually taken up be the other media, and the second edition then indeed extended beyond Senegal. Shortly after the introduction of the football cup, similar tournaments were started in rugby (1951) and basketball (1952).

The first edition in 1947, restricted to Senegal, had 16 participants; the highest number of participants (302) was reached in 1958/59, while the final edition (as Coupe Interfédérale; the territories of French West Africa were gradually gaining independence at the time) still had 205 participants (the regions of Guinée and Côte d'Ivoire did not enter).

== Winners ==
Season	Winner	Score	Runner-up	Losing Semifinalists		Ref.
Season	Winner	Score	Runner-up	lost to eventual winner	lost to eventual runner-up	
1947	US Gorée	2 - 1	ASC Jeanne d'Arc	Espoir Saint-Louis	Espérance Rufisque	
1948	Foyer France Sénégal	4 - 0	(Ivory Coast) Jeunesse Club d'Abidjan	Saint-Louisienne	(Guinea) Racing Club de Conakry	
1949	Racing Club de Dakar	3 - 0	(Guinea) Racing Club de Conakry	Espoir Saint-Louis	(Ivory Coast) USC Bassam	
1949–50	(Guinea) Racing Club de Conakry	4 - 2	Espoir Saint-Louis	(Ivory Coast) USC Bassam	(French Sudan) Jeanne d'Arc (Bamako)	
1950–51	ASC Jeanne d'Arc	3 - 1	(French Sudan) Jeanne d'Arc (Bamako)	(Ivory Coast) Africa Sports	US Indigène	
1951–52	ASC Jeanne d'Arc	2 - 0	(Republic of Dahomey) Etoile Sportive Porto-Novo	(Ivory Coast) Africa Sports	Foyer France Sénégal	
1952–53	(French Sudan) Jeanne d'Arc (Bamako)	3 - 1	(Guinea) Racing Club de Conakry	US Gorée	(Ivory Coast) Jeunesse Club d'Abidjan	
1953–54	US Gorée	1 - 0	(French Sudan) Foyer du Soudan	(Republic of Dahomey) Etoile Sportive Porto-Novo	(Guinea) Racing Club de Conakry	
1954–55	US Gorée	7 - 0	(Ivory Coast) ASEC Abidjan	(Republic of Dahomey) AS Porto-Novo	Avenir Saint-Louis	
1955–56	(French Sudan) Jeanne d'Arc (Bamako)	3 - 0	(Ivory Coast) ASEC Abidjan	Foyer France Sénégal	(Togo) Essor	
1956–57	Réveil de Saint-Louis	4 - 1	(Ivory Coast) Africa Sports	(Togo) Etoile Filante (Lomé)	(French Sudan) Jeanne d'Arc (Bamako)	
1957–58	(Ivory Coast) Africa Sports	5 - 0	(Ivory Coast) ASEC Abidjan	Foyer France Sénégal	(Guinea) Société Sportive de Guinée	
1958–59	(Senegal) Saint-Louisienne	2 - 1	(Togo) Modèle Lomé	(Ivory Coast) Stella d'Abidjan	(Senegal) ASC Jeanne d'Arc	
1960	(Togo) Etoile Filante (Lomé)	2 - 1	(Mali) Jeanne d'Arc (Bamako)	(Republic of Dahomey) AS Cotonou	(Senegal) Saint-Louisienne	

== Participating clubs ==
=== Mali (Soudan) ===
- Foyer du Soudan (later Djoliba AC)
- JA du Soudan
