= Ben Oumar Sy =

Guinean footballer and manager

Personal information
- Full name: Oumar Sy
- Date of birth: 8 January 1926
- Place of birth: Bamako, French Sudan
- Date of death: 25 August 2001 (aged 75)
- Position: Midfielder

Senior career*
Years	Team	Apps	(Gls)
1942–1957	Jeanne d'Arc		

Managerial career
- 1960–1975: Stade Malien
- 1962–1966: Mali
- * Club domestic league appearances and goals as of 05:16, 27 March 2021 (UTC) ‡ National team caps and goals as of 05:16, 27 March 2021 (UTC)

"Ben" Oumar Sy (8 January 1926 – 25 August 2001) was a Malian footballer and football manager. He was the first ever manager for Stade Malien and the Mali national team.

== Career ==
Sy began playing football with Jeanne d'Arc in French Sudan in the 1940s, and with them won the French West African Cup twice in 1953 and 1956 before retiring shortly after. He received the nickname "Ben" in reference to the then famed Moroccan-French footballer Larbi Benbarek.

In 1960, his old club Jeanne d'Arc and l’Espérance de Médine merged creating Stade Malien, and Sy was appointed their first ever manager. In 1961, he helped Stade Malien win the first ever Malian Cup in 1961. In 1965, he took the team to the final of the first ever CAF Champions League in 1965, where they lost to Oryx Douala.

In 1962, he was also appointed the first ever manager for the Mali football team after their independence in 1960. He managed the Mali national team and Stade Malien simultaneously for 4 years. After taking the team to the 1965 All-Africa Games, in 1966 he left the team to focus on Stade Malien. He managed Stade Malien until 1975, when he retired.

== Death ==
Sy died on August 25, 2001, at the age 75. He was buried the next day, and on the same day Stade Malien won their 16th Malian Cup.

The Super Coupe National du Mali is formally named after him, as is the best sports high school in Mali Lycée Sportif Ben Omar Sy.

== Honours ==
=== Player ===
Jeanne d'Arc

- French West African Cup: 1953, 1956

=== Manager ===
Stade Malien

- Malian Cup: 1961, 1963, 1970, 1972
- Malian Première Division: 1969–1970
