= Ouorou =

Ouorou is a Beninese surname. Notable people with the surname include:

- Djalilou Ouorou (born 1997), Beninese footballer
- Tamimou Ouorou (born 2003), Beninese footballer
- Yamirou Ouorou (born 2006), Beninese footballer
