= Oumar Tchomogo =

Beninese footballer (born 1978)

Personal information
- Date of birth: 7 January 1978 (age 48)
- Place of birth: Bohicon, Benin
- Height: 1.79 m (5 ft 10 in)
- Position: Forward

Team information
- Current team: Niort (assistant coach)

Youth career
- ASPAC

Senior career*
Years	Team	Apps	(Gls)
1996–1998	ASPAC		
1998–2001	Grenoble	53	(11)
2001–2003	Valence	71	(18)
2003–2005	Guingamp	18	(1)
2004–2005	→ Amiens (loan)	14	(1)
2005–2006	Vitória Setúbal	14	(0)
2006	Baniyas	1	(0)
2006–2007	Vitória Guimarães	11	(0)
2007–2008	Portimonense	13	(0)
2008–2009	Chambéry	5	(0)
2009	Al Kharaitiyat	2	(0)
2009–2012	Valence	31	(9)
2012–2013	Montélimar		

International career
1995–2008	Benin	34	(15)

Managerial career
- Benin (assistant)
- Montélimar (forward coach)
- 2013–2014: Benin
- 2015–2017: Benin
- 2020–2022: Niort (youth)
- 2022–: Niort B
- * Club domestic league appearances and goals

Oumar Tchomogo (born 7 January 1978) is a Beninese football manager and former professional player who is assistant coach for Ligue 2 club Niort.

== Club career ==
Born in Bohicon, Tchomogo began his career in 1996 with local club ASPAC FC. He moved to French side Grenoble Foot 38 in 1998 where in three years he scored 11 goals from 53 games. Following his departure from Grenoble in 2001, he played for ASOA Valence, En Avant de Guingamp and Amiens SC. He acquired French nationality by naturalization on 18 February 2002.

In the summer of 2005, he moved to Portuguese side Vitória de Setúbal. During his time with the club, he was a regular in the side under the management of Luís Norton de Matos. He appeared for the Sadinos in their very first Supertaça Cândido de Oliveira against Benfica. In January of the following year, he left Vitória for Baniyas SC. His stay proved to be unsuccessful as he only managed two appearances in the entire season.

In the summer of 2006 he returned to Portugal, this time to play for Vitória de Guimarães. Following his spell with Vitória de Guimarães, he left for Portimonense where he remained for one season. Following his departure from Portimonense in the summer of 2008, he played for Chambéry, Al Kharaitiyat and ASOA Valence. In the summer of 2012, he signed for French lower-league side UMS Montélimar.

== International career ==
Tchomogo made his national team debut at the age of 20 in 1998. During his international career, he helped his nation reach their very first Africa Cup of Nations in 2004. He was selected by then manager Cecil Jones Attuquayefio for the finals. Benin's first ever participation in the Africa Cup of Nations saw them finish bottom of their group behind Morocco, Nigeria and South Africa.

After Benin missed out on the 2006 edition, Benin qualified for the 2008 Africa Cup of Nations after finishing second in their qualification group behind Mali. Tchomogo scored two vital goals for Benin on the last match day of their qualification campaign against Sierra Leone to grant them access into the African Cup of Nations. He made the cut of the 23 players to be part of the squad to play at the tournament. Just like the 2004 edition, Benin finished bottom of their group with no points from three games. Tchomogo retired from international football in late 2009 after Benin failed to qualify for the 2010 Africa Cup of Nations.

== Coaching career ==
Tchomogo began his coaching career, while still playing amateur football in France, as assistant coach under manager Michel Dussuyer for Benin: "Towards the end of my career, Michel Dussuyer asked me to continue in the field and then gradually integrate the staff. I was his assistant for two years", Tchomogo revealed in an interview. However, it's only confirmed that he was in charge of this position at least in 2010. After hanging his boots up in the summer 2013, Tchomogo worked as a forward coach at UMS Montélimar.

In June 2013, Tchomogo was appointed head coach of Benin. He was in charge on temporary basis until March 2014. In May 2015, Tchomogo was once again appointed head coach of Benin. He left the position at the end of 2017.

In January 2020, Tchomogo was appointed youth coach at Chamois Niortais. After 2.5 years as an academy coach, Tchomogo took charge of the clubs reserve team in June 2022, which was playing in the Championnat National 3.

== Career statistics ==
Scores and results list Benin's goal tally first, score column indicates score after each Tchomogo goal.

List of international goals scored by Oumar Tchomogo
No.	Date	Venue	Opponent	Score	Result	Competition
2	2 August 1998	Stade de l'Amitié, Cotonou, Benin	Angola	1–0	2–1	2000 African Cup of Nations Qualification
3	2 August 1998	Stade de l'Amitié, Cotonou, Benin	Angola	2–0	2–1	2000 African Cup of Nations Qualification
4	8 September 2002	Stade René Pleven d'Akpakpa, Cotonou, Benin	Tanzania	3–0	4–0	2004 African Cup of Nations Qualification
5	8 June 2003	Stade de l'Amitié, Cotonou, Benin	Sudan	1–0	2–0	2004 African Cup of Nations Qualification
6	8 June 2003	Stade de l'Amitié, Cotonou, Benin	Sudan	2–0	2–0	2004 African Cup of Nations Qualification
7	6 July 2003	Cotonou, Benin	Zambia	1–0	3–0	2004 African Cup of Nations Qualification
8	6 July 2003	Cotonou, Benin	Zambia	2–0	3–0	2004 African Cup of Nations Qualification
9	16 November 2003	Stade de l'Amitié, Cotonou, Benin	Madagascar	1–2	3–2	2006 FIFA World Cup Qualification
10	16 November 2003	Stade de l'Amitié, Cotonou, Benin	Madagascar	2–2	3–2	2006 FIFA World Cup Qualification
11	16 November 2003	Stade de l'Amitié, Cotonou, Benin	Madagascar	3–2	3–2	2006 FIFA World Cup Qualification
12	4 July 2004	Stade de l'Amitié, Cotonou, Benin	Egypt	1–0	3–3	2006 FIFA World Cup Qualification
13	12 October 2007	National Stadium, Freetown, Sierra Leone	Sierra Leone	1–0	2–0	2008 Africa Cup of Nations Qualification
14	12 October 2007	National Stadium, Freetown, Sierra Leone	Sierra Leone	2–0	2–0	2008 Africa Cup of Nations Qualification
15	8 June 2008	Stade de l'Amitié, Cotonou, Benin	Uganda	2–1	4–1	2010 FIFA World Cup Qualification
