= Stade Municipal de Parakou =

Sports venue in Parakou, Benin

Coordinates: 9.3500°N 2.6167°E

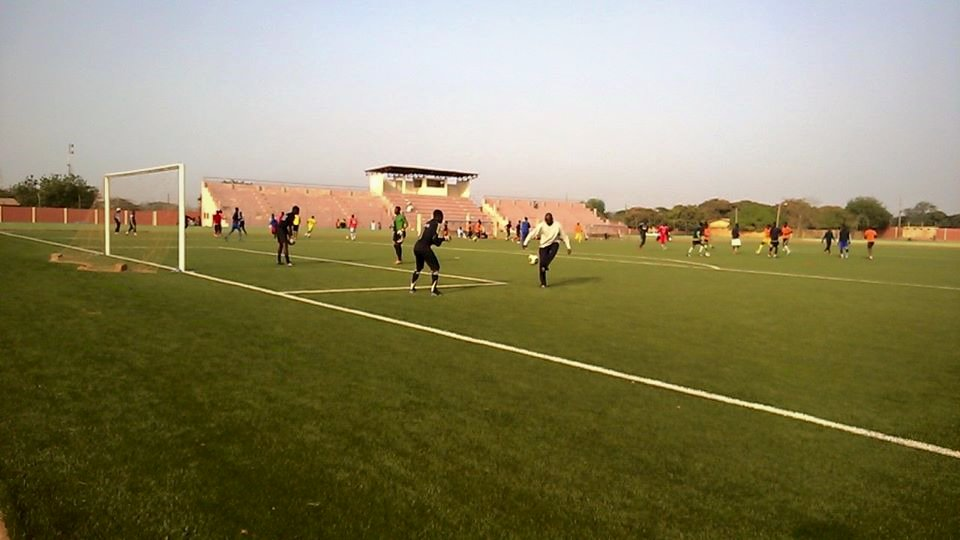
- Interactive map of Stade Municipal de Parakou
- Location: Parakou, Benin
- Capacity: 8,000

Tenants
- Buffles du Borgou FC; Dynamo Unacob FC de Parakou

Stade Municipal de Parakou is a multi-use stadium in Parakou, Benin. It is currently used mostly for football matches and is the home ground of Dynamo Unacob FC de Parakou and Buffles du Borgou FC of the Benin Premier League. The stadium has a capacity of 8,000 spectators.
