= Ajijas Cotonou =

Beninese football club

Ajijas
- Full name: Ajijas Cotonou
- Ground: Stade Charles de Gaulle; Cotonou, Benin
- Capacity: 15,000
- League: Benin Premier League

Ajijas Cotonou is a football club of Benin, playing in the city of Cotonou. They play in the Benin Second Division.

In 1981 the team has won the Benin Premier League.

== Achievements ==
- Benin Premier League: 1:1981

== Performance in CAF competitions ==
- CAF Champions League: 1 appearance

1982 African Cup of Champions Clubs – Preliminary Round

== Stadium ==
Currently the team plays at the Stade Charles de Gaulle.
