= Patrice Djokoué =

Beninese international football player

Patrice Djokoue
Personal information
- Date of birth: 16 May 1990 (age 36)
- Place of birth: Cotonou, Benin
- Height: 1.64 m (5 ft 4 1/2 in)
- Position: Midfielder

Team information
- Current team: Requins
- Number: 7

Youth career
- 2006–2008: Requins

Senior career*
Years	Team	Apps	(Gls)
2009–	Requins		

International career^{‡}
2008–	Benin	1	(0)
- * Club domestic league appearances and goals ‡ National team caps and goals as of 17 May 2008

Patrice Djokoue (born 16 May 1990, in Cotonou) is a Beninese international football player who currently plays in Benin for Requins.

== Career ==
He began to play for Requins and was promoted to first team in 2009.

== International ==
Djokoue his first call up was on 25 March 2009 against Ghana national football team.
