= Djamal Fassassi =

Beninese footballer

Personal information
- Date of birth: 23 November 1988 (age 37)
- Position: Midfielder

Team information
- Current team: Dragons

Senior career*
Years	Team	Apps	(Gls)
- ASOS
–2010	Dragons		
2010–2012	USS Kraké		
2012–2019	Cercle Mbéri Sportif		
2019–	Dragons		

International career
2010–2011	Benin	2	(0)
- * Club domestic league appearances and goals

Djamal Fassassi (born 23 November 1988) is a Beninese football midfielder who plays for Dragons.
