= Olatoundji Tessilimi =

Beninese footballer (born 2004)

Personal information
- Date of birth: 2 November 2004 (age 22)
- Place of birth: Porto-Novo, Benin
- Height: 1.75 m (5 ft 9 in)
- Position: Winger

Team information
- Current team: Dukla Prague

Youth career
- –2023: Ayema

Senior career*
Years	Team	Apps	(Gls)
2023	SJK Akatemia II	13	(15)
2023–	SJK Akatemia	12	(6)
2024–2026	SJK	33	(7)
2026–	Dukla Prague	0	(0)

International career^{‡}
2023–	Benin U20	4	(0)
2025–	Benin	2	(0)
- * Club domestic league appearances and goals as of 1 July 2026 ‡ National team caps and goals as of 5 January 2026

Olatoundji Tessilimi (born 2 November 2004) is a Beninese professional footballer who plays as a winger for Czech National Football League club Dukla Prague and the Benin national team.

== Club career ==
Tessilimi played with Ayema in his native Benin, before signing with Finnish SJK Seinäjoki organisation in 2023, and starting with their reserve team SJK Akatemia in Finnish second-tier. He missed the 2024 season due to injury, but eventually debuted in Veikkausliiga with SJK on 2 May 2025, in away loss against KuPS.

On 30 June 2026, Tessilimi signed a contract with Czech National Football League club Dukla Prague.

== International career ==
Tessilimi was called up to the Benin national under-20 football team by Mathias Déguénon for the 2023 U-20 Africa Cup of Nations.
