= Séïdath Tchomogo =

Beninese footballer (born 1985)

Personal information
- Full name: Séïdath Siriki Konabe Tchomogo
- Date of birth: 13 August 1985 (age 41)
- Place of birth: Porto-Novo, Benin
- Height: 1.79 m (5 ft 10 in)
- Position: Midfielder

Youth career
- Lions de l'Atakory

Senior career*
Years	Team	Apps	(Gls)
2003–2006	Lions de l'Atakory		
2007–2010	East Riffa Club	20	(3)
2010–2013	Al-Oruba	50	(15)
2013–2014	Panthères FC	50	(15)
2014	Al-Suwaiq		

International career
2003–2014	Benin	51	(6)
- * Club domestic league appearances and goals

Séïdath Konabe Tchomogo (born 13 August 1985) is a Beninese former professional footballer who played as a midfielder.

== International career ==
Tchomogo was part of the Benin national team at the 2004 African Nations Cup. He also played at the 2005 FIFA World Youth Championship in the Netherlands. He made his last appearance for Benin on 8 September 2013 in a 2014 FIFA World Cup qualification match against Rwanda which his side won 2–0.

== Football ban ==
In April 2019 Tchomogo was one of four African former international footballers banned for life by FIFA due to "match manipulation".

== Career statistics ==
Scores and results list Benin's goal tally first, score column indicates score after each Tchomogo goal.

List of international goals scored by Séïdath Tchomogo
No.	Date	Venue	Opponent	Score	Result	Competition
1	6 June 2004	Ahmadou Ahidjo Stadium, Yaoundé, Cameroon	Cameroon	1–0	1–2	2006 FIFA World Cup qualification
2	3 September 2006	Stade de Kégué, Lomé, Togo	Togo	1–2	1–2	2008 Africa Cup of Nations qualification
3	14 June 2008	Stade Général Seyni Kountché, Niamey, Niger	Niger	1–0	2–0	2010 FIFA World Cup qualification
4	21 June 2009	Stade du 26 Mars, Bamako, Mali	Mali	1–0	1–3	2010 FIFA World Cup qualification
5	9 October 2010	Amahoro Stadium, Kigali, Rwanda	Rwanda	1–0	3–0	2012 Africa Cup of Nations qualification
6	27 March 2011	Accra Sports Stadium, Accra, Ghana	Ivory Coast	1–0	1–2	2012 Africa Cup of Nations qualification
