= ESAE FC =

Former Beninese football club

- Full name: École Supérieure d'Administration, d'Économie, de Journalisme et des Métiers de l'Audiovisuel Football Club
- Nickname: Les Étudiants (The Students)
- Short name: ESAE
- Founded: 1996; 30 years ago (as Adjobi FC de Sakété)
- Dissolved: January 2021; 5 years ago
- Ground: Stade René Pleven d'Akpakpa
- Capacity: 15,000
- 2019–20: Vitalor Ligue 1, 2nd of 16
- Website: Archived website

École Supérieure d'Administration, d'Économie, de Journalisme et des Métiers de l'Audiovisuel Football Club was a Beninese association football club originally based in Sakété before it moved to the eighth arrondissement of Cotonou. The club formerly played in the Benin Premier League before it was dissolved in January 2021.

The club was founded as Adjobi FC de Sakété and was one of the four clubs that boycotted the return of the Benin Premier League after a two week break in 2014 before it was renamed École Supérieure d'Administration, d'Économie, de Journalisme et des Métiers de l'Audiovisuel Football Club in 2015. Clément Adéoti Adéchian became the president of the club in 2005. While he was president, the club ascended from the regional division to the top tier of Beninese football by 2011. The club was relegated to the regional division in 2013 before it was again promoted. The club was the sports association of the École supérieure d'administration, d'économie, de journalisme et des métiers de l'audiovisuel, which was founded by Adéchian.

The first trophy won by the club was the 2019 Coupe du Bénin.

It became the first football club from Benin to enter the group stage of an African competition in 2019, while it was managed by Richard Bio, after defeating the Senegalese club Génération Foot in a penalty shootout during the 2019–20 CAF Confederation Cup.

It won its second and final trophy, the 2020 Supercoupe du Bénin, after a 3–0 win against Buffles du Borgou, the champions of the 2018–19 Benin Premier League, in which a hat-trick was scored by the captain of the team, Farid Edou.

The club was dissolved in January 2021 due to new league regulations, and was succeeded by a new professional team based in Grand-Popo with the name Loto-Popo Football Club.

== Stadium ==
The club played at the Stade Municipal de Sakété before it moved to the 15,000 capacity Stade René Pleven d'Akpakpa in Cotonou.

== Notable former players ==
- Mouritala Ogunbiyi
- Khaled Adénon
- Marcel Dandjinou
- Charbel Gomez

== African record ==
Competition	Appearances	Matches played	Won	Drawn	Lost	GF	GA
CAF Confederation Cup	2	14	3	4	7	9	13

Season	Competition	Round		Club	Home	Away	Aggregate
2019–20	CAF Confederation Cup	PR	(Mauritania)	ASC Snim	2–0	5–0	7–0
2019–20	CAF Confederation Cup	1R	(Burkina Faso)	Salitas	0–0	0–0	0–0 (3–2 pen.)
2019–20	CAF Confederation Cup	Playoff	(Senegal)	Génération Foot	0–1	1–0	1–1 (4–3 pen.)
2019–20	CAF Confederation Cup	Group C	(Morocco)	RS Berkane	1–5	0–3	4th place
2019–20	CAF Confederation Cup	Group C	(Zambia)	Zanaco	0–0	0–3	4th place
2019–20	CAF Confederation Cup	Group C	(Democratic Republic of the Congo)	DC Motema Pembe	0–2	0–1	4th place
2020–21	CAF Confederation Cup	1R	(Morocco)	TAS Casablanca	1–1	0–4	1–5

== Honours ==
- Coupe du Bénin: 2019
- Supercoupe du Bénin: 2020
