= Fassassi =

Fassassi is a surname. Notable people with the surname include:

- Djamal Fassassi (born 1988), Beninese footballer
- Kamarou Fassassi (1948–2016), Beninese politician
