= Stade Municipal de Djougou =

Sports venue in Djougou, Benin

Coordinates: 9.7000°N 1.6667°E

- Stade Municipal de Djougou
- Interactive map of Stade Municipal de Djougou
- Full name: Stade Municipal de Djougou
- Location: Djougou, Benin
- Capacity: 3,400

Tenant
- Panthères FC

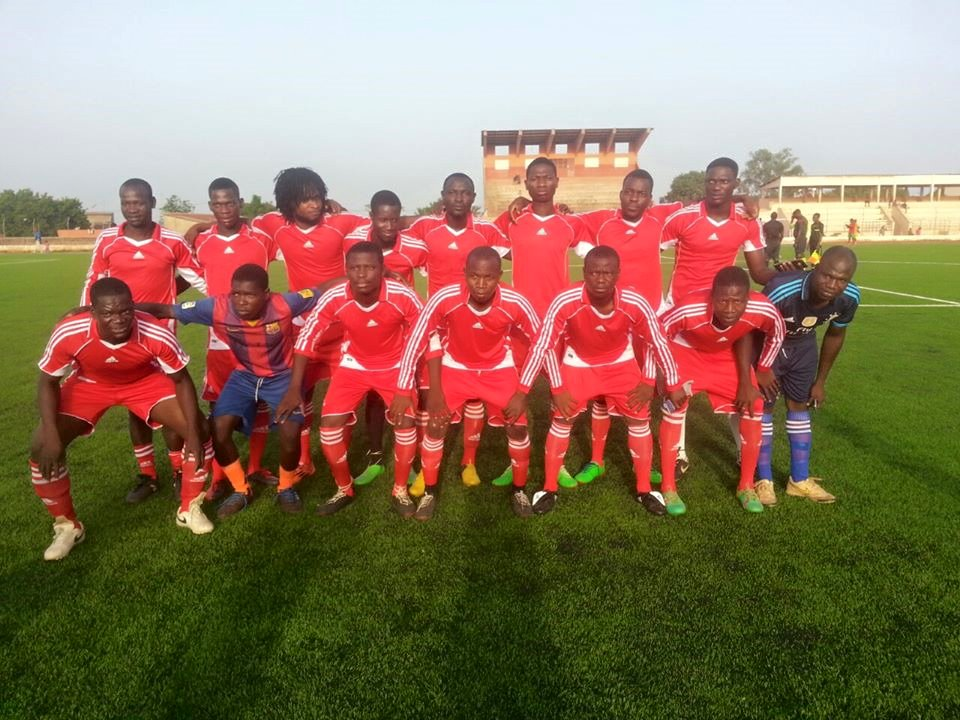
Stade municipal Djougou

Stade Municipal de Djougou is a multi-use stadium in Djougou, Benin. It is currently used mostly for football matches and is the home ground of Panthères FC of the Benin Premier League. The stadium has a capacity of 3,400 spectators.
