= Stade Goho =

Sports venue in Abomey, Benin

- Stade Goho
- Full name: Stade Goho
- Location: Abomey, Benin
- Capacity: 7,500

Tenant
- Dynamo Abomey F.C.

Stade Goho is a multi-use stadium in Abomey, Benin. It is currently used mostly for football matches and is the home ground of Dynamo Abomey F.C. of the Benin Premier League. The stadium has a capacity of 7,500 spectators.
