= Université Nationale du Bénin FC =

Beninese football club

Universite du Benin
- Full name: Université Nationale du Bénin FC
- Ground: Stade Charles de Gaulle; Porto-Novo, Benin
- Capacity: 15,000
- League: Benin Premier League

Université Nationale du Bénin FC is a football club of Benin, playing in the town of Porto-Novo. They play in the Beninese Second division.

In 1996 the team has won the Benin Cup.

== Achievements ==
- Benin Cup: 2:1996, 2007

== Performance in CAF competitions ==
- CAF Confederation Cup: 1 appearance

2008 CAF Confederation Cup – Preliminary Round

== Stadium ==
Currently the team plays at the 15000 capacity Stade Charles de Gaulle.
