= Tony Toklomety =

Beninese footballer

Personal information
- Full name: Tony Stanislas Toklomety
- Date of birth: 3 March 1984 (age 42)
- Place of birth: Cotonou, Benin
- Position: Defender

Senior career*
Years	Team	Apps	(Gls)
2001–2003	Postel Sport	51	(7)
2003–2004	Maccabi Netanya	11	(1)
2004–2006	Postel Sport	42	(8)
2006–2007	MŠK Žilina	10	(0)
2007–2010	Postel Sport	76	(2)
2010–2012	Enyimba	40	(5)
2012–2013	AS Marsa	0	(0)

International career
2001–2005	Benin	19	(0)
- * Club domestic league appearances and goals

Tony Toklomety (born 3 March 1984) is a Beninese former professional footballer.

== Career ==
Toklomety previously played for Maccabi Netanya F.C., Postel Sport and MŠK Žilina. Tokolomety was accused of faking his year of birth on his passport by the Israeli media, a claim that was never proving to be true. In result of these publications, Netanya decided to release him from his contract. Tony's son Idan Gorno is also a footballer, he was born in Israel and plays now for Maccabi Petah Tikva and the Israel national under-19 football team. In 2018 a documentary movie titled Toklomati was released on what happened to Tony while playing in Israel, while now being on a journey to Israel in order to become an Israeli citizen to live next to his Israeli born son. The movie got accepted in the Jerusalem Film Festival and the Chicago International Film Festival.

== International career ==
He was part of the Beninese 2004 African Nations Cup team, who finished bottom of their group in the first round of competition, thus failing to secure qualification for the quarter-finals.

== Personal life ==
Toklomety's son, Idan Toklomati is an Israeli professional footballer.

== Honours ==
- Slovak Super Liga
  - Winner (1): 2006–07
- Nigerian Premier League
  - Winner (1): 2009–10
