= Forces Armées =

Beninese football club

- Full name: Forces Armées
- Ground: Stade Charles de Gaulle; Cotonou, Benin
- Capacity: 15,000
- League: Benin Premier League

Forces Armées is a football club of Benin, playing in the city of Cotonou. They play in the Benin Second Division.

In 1969 the team has won the Benin Premier League.

== Honours ==
- Benin Premier League: 1 (1969)

== Performance in CAF competitions ==
- CAF Champions League: 1 appearance

1970 African Cup of Champions Clubs – Preliminary Round

== Stadium ==
Currently the team plays at the Stade Charles de Gaulle in Cotonou, Benin.
