= Toffa Cotonou FC =

Beninese football club

Toffa Cotonou
- Full name: Toffa Cotonou Football Club
- Founded: ?
- Ground: Stade Charles de Gaulle; Cotonou, Benin
- Capacity: 15,000
- Chairman: ?
- Manager: ?
- League: Benin Second Division

Toffa Cotonou is a football club of Benin, based in the town of Cotonou. They played in the Beninese first division, the Benin Premier League.

In 1995 the team has won the Benin Premier League.

== Achievements ==
- Benin Premier League: 1

1995

== Stadium ==
Currently the team plays at the 15000 capacity Stade Charles de Gaulle.
