= Patrice Lair =

French football coach (born 1961)

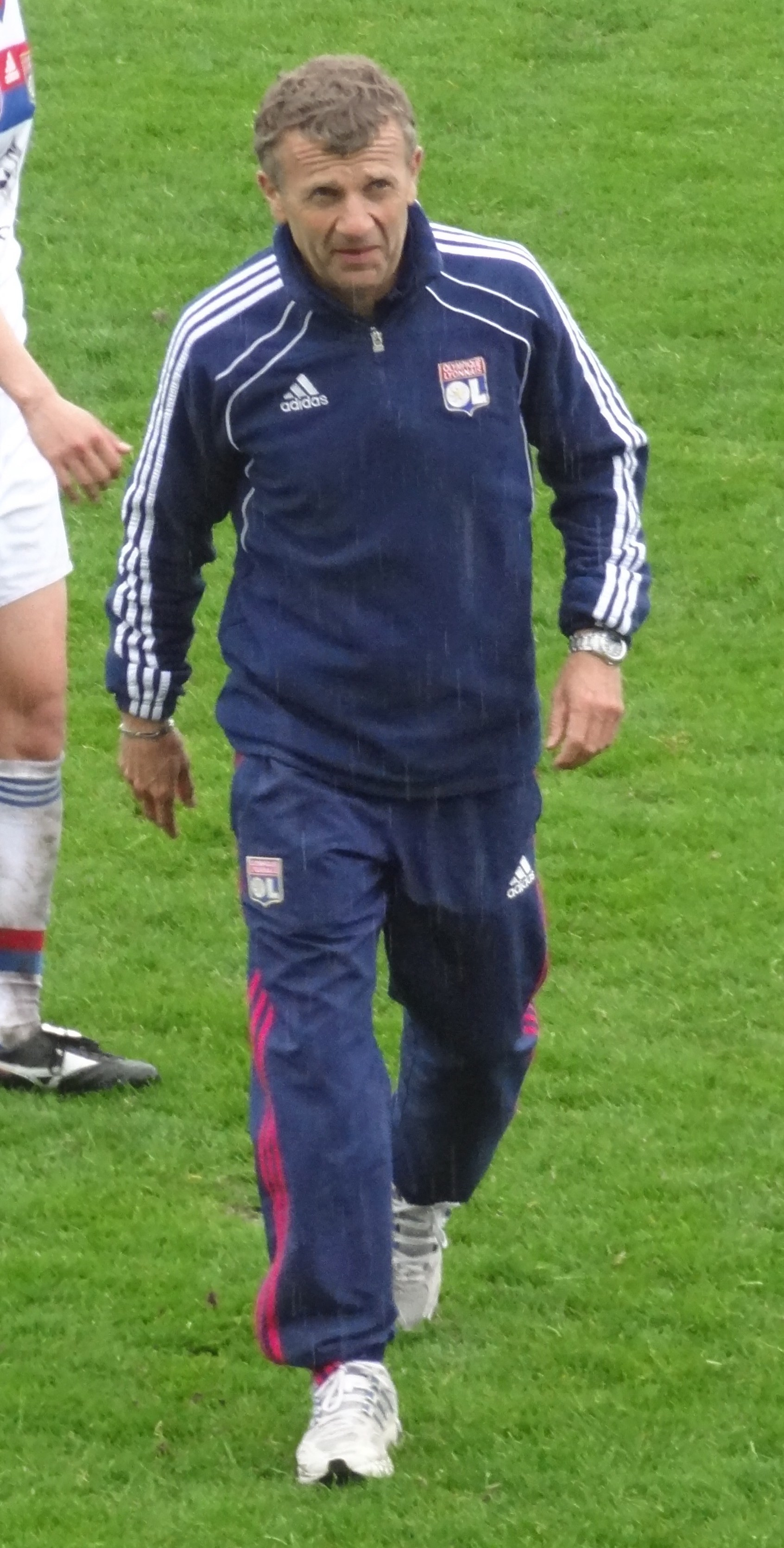
- Lair as manager of Lyon (women) in 2012

Personal information
- Date of birth: 16 June 1961 (age 65)
- Place of birth: Saint-Brieuc, France

Senior career*
Years	Team	Apps	(Gls)
1977–1985	Stade Briochin		
1985–1987	Avranches		
1987–1991	Périgueux		
1991–1993	St.-Malo		
1993–1994	Pouancé		
1994–1995	Racing Doué		
1995–1996	Pouzauges		
1996–1998	Trélissac		
1998–2000	Briviste		
2000–2001	Reims		

Managerial career
- 1993–1994: Pouancé
- 1994–1995: Racing Doué
- 1995–1996: Pouzauges
- 2004–2005: Villeneuve
- 2005–2007: Montpellier Women
- 2007–2009: Castelnau
- 2009: Espoir Savalou
- 2010: Rwanda U-17
- 2010–2014: Lyon Women
- 2016–2018: Paris SG Women
- 2018: Niort
- 2019: Guingamp
- 2021–2024: Bordeaux Women
- 2024: Châteauroux
- 2025–2026: Toluca Women
- * Club domestic league appearances and goals

Patrice Lair (born 16 June 1961) is a French football coach and a former player. He was most recently head coach of Liga MX Femenil club Toluca.

== Career ==
As a footballer Lair played in the lower categories in France. After spending a decade with Stade Briochin and Avranches, in 1987 he moved to Périgueux, where he had his first experience as a coach, coaching the junior team while playing in the first team. He repeated these functions in St.-Malo before making his debut as a player-coach in Pouancé in 1993. He subsequently played and coached for Racing Doué, Pouzages, Trélissac, Briviste and Reims either as a player-coach or training junior teams, before retiring in 2001.

After retiring, he was appointed the assistant coach of Stade de Reims, which was promoted in 2002 to Ligue 2 after a decade in lower categories. After first team coach Marc Collat was sacked in 2003, he was offered his position, but he declined the offer and moved to Angoulême as an assistant coach. In 2004, he held his first position as a first team coach at Villeneuve, and in 2005 he made his debut in women's football, taking charge of defending champion Montpellier Women. Under Lair's two year tenure, Montpellier won two national cups, reached the 2006 European Cup semi-finals and was the championship's runner-up behind Juvisy and Lyon. Lair subsequently returned to male amateur football, coaching Castelnau for two seasons. In 2009, he moved to Benin to coach Espoir de Savalou, but he left the team after a month. He also coached briefly the Rwanda under-17 national team, also serving as the senior team's assistant coach, the following year.

In June 2010, Lair returned to France to coach the Lyon women's team, replacing Farid Benstiti. He was nominated for the FIFA Women's Football World Coach award in 2011 and 2012. After the 2013–14 Division 1 Féminine season, Lair stepped down as the Coach of Olympique Lyonnais women's team, after achieving a third straight domestic double. He stated that it was the perfect way to leave. During his reign at Lyon, Lair led the club to four Division 1 Féminine titles, three Coupe de France Féminine titles and two UEFA Women's Champions League titles.

On 28 May 2018, he was announced as the new head coach of Niort. In December 2018 he was suspended, and he was formally sacked in January 2019.

On 4 June 2019, he was announced manager of newly relegated Ligue 2 club Guingamp for the 2019/20 season. After a poor start, which saw the club in 14th place with nine points, he was sacked on 23 September 2019.

On 5 August 2021, he was appointed as the new coach of the Girondins de Bordeaux women's team. In March 2024, he left the position after a poor performance in the 2023–24 Division 1 Féminine season.

In July 2024 he took charge of LB Châteauroux ahead of the 2023–24 Championnat National. In October 2024, he left the position by mutual agreement with the club.

On 23 May 2025, Lair was hired as the new coach of the Toluca F.C. women's team in the Liga MX Femenil. In May 2026 Lair left the team.
