= Stade Cotonou II =

Multi-use stadium in Porto-Novo, Benin

- Stade Cotonou II
- Full name: Stade Cotonou II
- Location: Porto-Novo, Benin
- Capacity: 6,000

Tenant
- USS Kraké

Stade Cotonou II is a multi-use stadium in Porto-Novo, Benin. It is currently used mostly for football matches and is the home ground of USS Kraké of the Benin Premier League. The stadium has a capacity of 6,000 spectators.
