= Raimi Kola =

Beninese soccer player (born 1995)

Raimi Kola Kowiyu
Personal information
- Full name: Raimi Kola Kowiyu
- Date of birth: July 15, 1995 (age 31)
- Place of birth: Cotonou, Benin
- Height: 1.80 m (5 ft 11 in)
- Position: Striker

Team information
- Current team: Tonnerre d'Abomey FC
- Number: 7

Youth career
- 2010: Karamone

Senior career*
| Years | Team | Apps | (Gls) |
| 2011–2014 | Onze Createurs | 54 | (24) |
| 2014–2015 | Buffles du Borgou FC | 34 | (16) |
| 2015–2017 | ASPAC FC | 56 | (24) |
| 2015–2017 | Abia Warriors F.C. | 51 | (14) |
| 2019– | Tonnerre d'Abomey FC | 7 | (3) |

International career^{‡}
| 2011–2012 | Benin U-17 | 6 | (2) |
| 2013–2014 | Benin U-20 | 10 | (6) |
| 2016–2017 | Benin U-23 | 5 | (1) |
| 2017– | Benin | 13 | (5) |
- * Club domestic league appearances and goals as of 16 December 2019 ‡ National team caps and goals as of 16 December 2019

Raimi Kola Kowiyu is a Nigeria-born naturalized Beninese national soccer team player. He presently plays for AS Tonnerre in the Benin premier league 2019–20 season. He has played as forward for Abia Warriors. in the Nigeria Premier League, Buffles du Borgou FC, ASPAC FC.

Kowiyou Kola scored 2 goals in 6 games for the Beninese U17 team, and 2 goals in 7 games with the U20s. As a national team player, he has scored 2 goals in 7 games. He has been playing for the Benin republic senior national team since 3 years as he is part of the current senior national team players.

== Playing career ==
Kola Raimi got call-up back into the Benin senior national team after his contract expiration with Abia Warriors.
