= 1982 African Cup of Champions Clubs =

Tournament details
- Teams: 36 (from 1 confederation)

Final positions
- Champions: (Egypt) Al Ahly (1st title)
- Runners-up: (Ghana) Asante Kotoko

Tournament statistics
- Matches played: 68
- Goals scored: 168 (2.47 per match)
- Top scorer: (Egypt) Mahmoud El Khatib (6 goals)

The 1982 African Cup of Champions Clubs was the 18th edition of the annual international club football competition held in the CAF region (Africa), the African Cup of Champions Clubs. It determined that year's club champion of association football in Africa.

The tournament was played by 36 teams and was used a playoff scheme with home and away matches. Al Ahly SC from Egypt won that final, and became for the first time CAF club champion.

== Preliminary round ==
Team 1	Agg.	Team 2	1st leg	2nd leg
Atlético Malabo (Equatorial Guinea)	1–4	(Central African Republic) Sporting Moura	0–1	1–3
Mhlume Peacemakers (Eswatini)	3–2	(Lesotho) Maseru Brothers	1–0	2–2
ASC Police (Mauritania)	1–3	(Benin) Adjidjas FAP	0–2	1–1
Vital'O (Burundi)	3–2	(Rwanda) Rayon Sport	3–1	0–1

== First round ==
Team 1	Agg.	Team 2	1st leg	2nd leg
AS Kaloum Star (Guinea)	3–1	(Sierra Leone) Real Republicans	3–0	0–1
Adjidjas FAP (Benin)	2–6	(Ivory Coast) Stella Adjamé	1–3	1–3
Al-Hilal (Sudan)	1–1 (4–1 p)	(Algeria) JE Tizi Ouzou	1–0	0–1
Dynamos FC (Zimbabwe)	4–3	Botswana Defence Force XI	2–2	2–1
Etoile du Congo (Republic of the Congo)	1–2	(Mali) Real Bamako	1–1	0–1
FC Lupopo (Zaire)	7–2	(Central African Republic) Sporting Moura	4–2	3–0
Green Buffaloes (Zambia)	2–0	(Burundi) Vital'O	0–0	2–0
Invincible Eleven (Liberia)	2–1	(Cameroon) Tonnerre Yaoundé	1–0	1–1
KCC (Uganda)	4–4 (a)	(Kenya) AFC Leopards	3–0	1–4
Lavori Publici (Somalia)	0–1	(Egypt) Al Ahly	0–0	0–1
USM Nziami (Gabon)	w/o^{1}	(Senegal) US Gorée	—	—
Primeiro de Agosto (Angola)	1–3	(Nigeria) Enugu Rangers	1–1	0–3
RS Kouba (Algeria)	4–2	(Morocco) KAC Kenitra	1–1	3–1
Semassi (Togo)	3–4	(Ghana) Asante Kotoko	3–2	0–2
AS Somasud (Madagascar)	4–2	(Eswatini) Mhlume Peacemakers	4–0	0–2
Têxtil do Punguè (Mozambique)	1–4	(Tanzania) Young Africans	1–2	0–2

^{1} US Gorée withdrew.

== Second round ==
Team 1	Agg.	Team 2	1st leg	2nd leg
Al Ahly (Egypt)	6–1	(Tanzania) Young Africans	5–0	1–1
Al-Hilal (Sudan)	1–5	(Uganda) KCC	0–2	1–3
Enugu Rangers (Nigeria)	1–0	(Guinea) AS Kaloum Star	0–0	1–0
FC Lupopo (Zaire)	1–1 (a)	(Zimbabwe) Dynamos FC	0–0	1–1
Green Buffaloes (Zambia)	6–1	(Madagascar) AS Somasud	3–0	3–1
Invincible Eleven (Liberia)	0–3	(Ghana) Asante Kotoko	0–0	0–3
USM Nziami (Gabon)	1–2	(Mali) Real Bamako	1–0	0–2
Stella Adjamé (Ivory Coast)	1–1 (3–4 p)	(Algeria) RS Kouba	1–0	0–1

== Quarter-finals ==
Team 1	Agg.	Team 2	1st leg	2nd leg
Al Ahly (Egypt)	3–2	(Zambia) Green Buffaloes	3–1	0–1
Asante Kotoko (Ghana)	7–1	(Uganda) KCC	6–0	1–1
Enugu Rangers (Nigeria)	7–1	(Algeria) RS Kouba	5–0	2–1
FC Lupopo (Zaire)	4–3	(Mali) Real Bamako	2–0	2–3

== Semi-finals ==
Team 1	Agg.	Team 2	1st leg	2nd leg
Enugu Rangers (Nigeria)	1–4	(Egypt) Al Ahly	1–0	0–4
FC Lupopo (Zaire)	1–4	(Ghana) Asante Kotoko	1–2	0–2

== Final ==
28 November 1982
--:-- UTC+2

Al Ahly (Egypt)	3–0	(Ghana) Asante Kotoko
El Khatib 13', 34'; Mayhoub 19'

Cairo International Stadium, Cairo
Attendance: 60,000
Referee: Sinko Zeli (Ivory Coast)
12 December 1982
--:-- UTC+0

Asante Kotoko (Ghana)	1–1	(Egypt) Al Ahly
Bannerman 12'		El Khatib 70'

Kumasi Sports Stadium, Kumasi
Attendance: 50,000
Referee: Dodou N'Jie (Gambia)

== Champion ==
1982 African Cup of Champions Clubs winners

Al Ahly SC
First Title

== Top scorers ==
The top scorers from the 1982 African Cup of Champions Clubs are as follows:

Rank	Name	Team	Goals
1	(Egypt) Mahmoud El Khatib	(Egypt) Al Ahly	6
2	(Egypt) Alaa Mayhoub	(Egypt) Al Ahly	4
3	(Ghana) Opoku Afriyie	(Ghana) Asante Kotoko	3
3	(Nigeria) Sylvanus Okpala	(Nigeria) Enugu Rangers	3
5	(Algeria) Salah Assad	(Algeria) RS Kouba	2
5	(Egypt) Gamal Abdel Hamid	(Egypt) Al Ahly	2
5	(Ghana) John Bannerman	(Ghana) Asante Kotoko	2
