= Charbel Gomez =

Beninese footballer

Personal information
- Full name: Codjo Charbel Gomez
- Date of birth: 27 January 2001 (age 25)
- Place of birth: Cotonou, Benin
- Height: 1.83 m (6 ft 0 in)
- Position: Striker

Team information
- Current team: Muras United
- Number: 9

Youth career
- 2016–2017: Espoir FC
- 2017–2019: ESAE FC

Senior career*
Years	Team	Apps	(Gls)
2019–2021	Amiens II	15	(4)
2021–2023	Amiens	10	(0)
2023	→ Samgurali Tsqaltubo (loan)	28	(3)
2025–	Muras United	22	(6)

International career^{‡}
2017–	Benin	18	(0)
- * Club domestic league appearances and goals as of 12:17, 8 November 2025 (UTC) ‡ National team caps and goals as of 21:41, 13 October 2025 (UTC)

Codjo Charbel Gomez (born 27 January 2001) is a Beninese professional footballer who plays for Kyrgyz Premier League club Muras United, as a striker.

== Career ==
Gomez spent his early career with Espoir FC, ESAE FC, Amiens, and Samgurali Tsqaltubo. After nearly 18 months out of the game, he signed for Kyrgyz Premier League club Muras United in March 2025. By June 2025, he had scored 3 goals in 11 matches and won his first Man of the Match award.
