= Noah Ato-Zandanga =

Central African footballer

Personal information
- Full name: Noah Kévin Ato-Zandanga
- Date of birth: 5 July 2003 (age 23)
- Place of birth: Quincy-sous-Sénart, France
- Height: 1.81 m (5 ft 11 in)
- Position: Left-back

Team information
- Current team: FC Wil
- Number: 26

Youth career
- 2017–2018: CFFP
- 2018–2019: CS Brétigny
- 2019–2020: Montferrand
- 2020–2022: Torcy

Senior career*
Years	Team	Apps	(Gls)
2022–2023	Santanyí	15	(0)
2024–2025	Lusitanos Saint-Maur	1	(0)
2025	Sion U21	13	(3)
2025–	FC Wil	23	(0)

International career^{‡}
2023	Central African Republic U23	3	(0)
2023–	Central African Republic	8	(0)
- * Club domestic league appearances and goals as of 30 September 2026 ‡ National team caps and goals as of 13:18, 14 October 2025 (UTC)

Noah Kévin Ato-Zandanga (born 5 July 2003) is a professional footballer who plays as a left-back for the Swiss Challenge League club FC Wil. Born in France, he plays for the Central African Republic national team.

== Club career ==
Ato-Zandanga is a product of the academies of the French clubs CFFP, CS Brétigny, Montferrand and Torcy. He began his senior career in 2022 with the Spanish Tercera Federación club Santanyí. In 2024, he had a stint with the French Championnat National 3 club Lusitanos Saint-Maur. In January 2025, he joined FC Sion, and was originally assigned to their reserves in the Swiss 1. Liga. On 11 July 2025, he transferred to FC Wil in the Swiss Challenge League.

== International career ==
Born in France, Ato-Zandanga is of Central African descent and holds dual French-Central African citizenship. He was called up to the Central African Republic U23s for the 2023 U-20 Africa Cup of Nations. On 18 March 2023, he was first called up to the senior Central African Republic national team for a set of 2023 Africa Cup of Nations qualification matches.
