= AS Cotonou =

Beninese football club

- Full name: AS Cotonou
- Ground: Stade René Pleven D´akpakpa; Cotonou, Benin
- Capacity: 15,000
- League: Benin Premier League
- 2025–2026: 7th

AS Cotonou is a football club of Benin, playing in the town of Cotonou. They play in the Beninese Second division, the Benin Second Division.

In 1971 the team has won the Benin Premier League.

== Achievements ==
- Benin Premier League: 1:1971

== Performance in CAF competitions ==
- CAF Champions League: 1 appearance

1972 African Cup of Champions Clubs - Preliminary Round

== Stadium ==
Currently the team plays at the Stade Charles de Gaulle.
