= Lions de l'Atakory =

Beninese football club

Lions
- Full name: Lions de l'Atakory Football Club
- Ground: Stade Charles de Gaulle; Porto-Novo, Benin
- Capacity: 15,000
- League: Benin Premier League

Lions de l'Atakory Football Club is a football club of Benin, playing in the city of Cotonou. They play in the Beninese Second division, the Benin Second Division.

In 1984 the team has won the Benin Premier League.

== Achievements ==
- Benin Premier League
  - Champions (1):1984

== Performance in CAF competitions ==
- CAF Champions League: 1 appearance

1985 African Cup of Champions Clubs – Preliminary Round

== Stadium ==
Currently the team plays at the Stade Charles de Gaulle.
