= Mogas 90 FC =

Beninese football club

- Full name: Mogas 90 Football Club
- Ground: Stade Charles de Gaulle; Porto-Novo, Benin
- Capacity: 15,000
- Manager: Fortuné Glele
- League: Benin Premier League
- 2013–14: 11th
Home colours

Mogas 90 Football Club is a football club of Benin, playing in the city of Porto-Novo. They currently play in the Benin Premier League.

== Achievements ==
- Benin Premier League: 3

1996, 1997, 2006

- Benin Cup: 10

1991, 1992, 1994, 1995, 1998, 1999, 2000, 2003, 2004, 2012

== Performance in CAF competitions ==
- CAF Champions League: 3 appearances

1997 – Preliminary Round
1998 – First Round
2007 – Preliminary Round

- CAF Confederation Cup: 2 appearances

2004 – Preliminary Round
2005 – Preliminary Round

- CAF Cup: 2 appearances

1994 – disqualified in First Round
1995 – First Round

- CAF Cup Winners' Cup: 4 appearances

1992 – Quarter-finals
1996 – First Round
1999 – Preliminary Round
2000 – First Round
