= Henry Uche =

Nigerian footballer

Personal information
- Full name: Henry Iffanyi Uche
- Date of birth: 18 August 1990 (age 36)
- Place of birth: Umuahia, Nigeria
- Height: 1.74 m (5 ft 8 1/2 in)
- Position: Midfielder

Team information
- Current team: AFC Leopards

Youth career
- Shooting Stars

Senior career*
Years	Team	Apps	(Gls)
2010–2014	Enyimba		
2014	FK Kukësi	11	(0)
2014–2017	Shooting Stars		
2017–	AFC Leopards		

International career^{‡}
2012–	Nigeria	5	(0)
- * Club domestic league appearances and goals as of 18:27, 20 February 2018 (UTC) ‡ National team caps and goals as of 18:33, 9 February 2015 (UTC)

Henry Iffanyi Uche // (born 18 August 1990) is a Nigerian international footballer who plays as a midfielder for AFC Leopards.

== Career ==
=== Club career ===
After playing in Nigeria with Shooting Stars and Enyimba, Uche moved to Albanian club FK Kukësi in January 2014.

Uche signed for AFC Leopards on 15 December 2017.

=== International career ===
He made his international debut for Nigeria in 2012.
