= Etoile Sportive Porto-Novo =

Beninese football club

Etoile Sportive
- Full name: Etoile Sportive Porto-Novo
- Ground: Stade Charles de Gaulle; Porto-Novo, Benin
- Capacity: 15,000
- League: Benin Premier League

Etoile Sportive Porto-Novo is a football club in Benin, playing in the town of Porto-Novo. They play in the Beninese Second division.

In 1974 the team has won the Benin Premier League.

== Stadium ==
Currently the team plays at the 35000 capacity Stade Charles de Gaulle.

== Performance in CAF competitions ==
- CAF Champions League: 1 appearance

1975 African Cup of Champions Clubs – First Round
