= Dadjè FC =

Football club in Benin

Dadjè
- Full name: Dadjè Football Club d'Aplahoué
- Nickname: The People's Club
- Founded: 2012
- Ground: Stade Aplahoué, Aplahoué, Benin
- Capacity: 3,000
- League: League 2
- 2025–26: 18th in Benin Premier League (relegated)
Home colours	Away colours

Dadjè FC is a professional football club based in Aplahoué, Benin. They play in the Benin Premier League, the top division of Beninese football.

== History ==
The club was founded in 2012 in the city of Aplahoué. In the 2015–16 season, they competed in the second division during a transitional campaign following the cancellation of football in the country, reaching the promotion round.

After the cancellation of the league due to the COVID-19 pandemic in 2020, Dadjè FC made their debut in the Benin Premier League upon its resumption in 2021, successfully avoiding relegation.

In the 2023–24 season, the club finished as national runners-up, four points behind Coton FC, which qualified them for the 2024–25 CAF Confederation Cup. They were eliminated in the second round by RS Berkane of Morocco.

== Honours ==
- Benin Premier League
  - Winners: 2024–25

== CAF competitions ==
Season	Competition	Round	Opponent	Home	Away	Aggregate
2024–25	CAF Confederation Cup	First round	(Nigeria) El Kanemi Warriors	2–1	1–1	3–2
2024–25	CAF Confederation Cup	Second round	(Morocco) RS Berkane	0–2	0–5	0–7
2025–26	CAF Champions League	First round	(Libya) Al Ahli Tripoli	0–0	0–1	0–1

== Players ==
=== Current squad (2024–25) ===
Note: Flags indicate national team as defined under FIFA eligibility rules; some limited exceptions apply. Players may hold more than one non-FIFA nationality.

No.	Pos.	Nation	Player
—	GK	BEN	Rahman Abdoul
—	GK	BEN	Setondji Adounkpe
—	GK	BEN	Guillaume Agbegninou
—	DF	BEN	Dodji Attivi
—	DF	BEN	Vanie Bi
—	DF	BEN	David Chukwudi
—	DF	BFA	Brice Dabre
—	DF	BEN	Lupens Dassi
—	DF	BEN	Mawulolo Djionou
—	DF	BEN	Kokou Ganke
—	DF	BEN	Feliciano Montcho
—	DF	BEN	Ronaldo Tchinounse
—	DF	BEN	Philippe Winsavi
—	MF	BEN	Koke Alankpokinto
—	MF	BEN	Adam Alidou
—	MF	CIV	Salif Bagate
—	MF	BEN	Sanni Guera
—	MF	BEN	Aguiah Narcisse
—	MF	BEN	Roufai Sohbour
—	FW	BEN	Salasie Bakai
—	FW	BEN	Daniel Tseeneke
—	FW	BEN	Segnon Vignigbe
