= Coton FC =

Beninese football club

- Full name: Coton Football Club
- Founded: 1999; 27 years ago
- Ground: Stade omnisports d'Ouidah; Ouidah, Benin
- Capacity: 3,000
- Chairman: Lionel Talon
- Manager: Urbain Honfo
- League: Benin Premier League
- 2025–26: 2nd
- Website: https://cotonsport.bj/
Home colours	Away colours	Third colours

Coton Football Club, is a Beninese professional football club based in Ouidah, that competes in the Benin Premier League.

== History ==
The club, originally founded as Taneka FC in Natitingou, became Coton FC upon its acquisition by Coton Sport Benin, a consortium owned by the Cotton Development Company (SODECO), presided over by Lionel Talon.

During the 2021–2022 season, the club, which was competing in the second division, was invited to participate in the Benin national premier division for the first time, blending teams from both the premier and second divisions, much like the 2020–2021 season. Under the leadership of former French international Victor Zvunka and Beninese coach Urbain Honfo, Coton FC qualified for the Super Ligue Pro. The club finished the season in first place, clinching its maiden championship title.

In April 2023, a supporters' group named "groupe foot," based in France, emerged to support the club through social media, thereby increasing the club's visibility.

== See also ==
- Benin Premier League
- Benin Cup
