= Béké FC de Bembèrèkè =

Beninese football club

Béké Bembèrèkè
- Full name: Béké Football Club de Bembèrèkè
- Founded: 1994
- Ground: Stade Municipal de Bembèrèkè; Bembèrèkè, Benin
- Capacity: 1,000
- League: Benin Premier League

Béké Football Club de Bembèrèkè is a football club in Benin. They currently play in the Benin Premier League.

The club was founded in 1994.

== Stadium ==
The team plays at the 1,000 capacity Stade Municipal de Bembèrèkè.
