= Moussa Latoundji =

Beninese footballer and manager (born 1978)

Personal information
- Full name: Moussa Latoundji
- Date of birth: 13 August 1978 (age 48)
- Place of birth: Porto-Novo, Benin
- Height: 1.77 m (5 ft 10 in)
- Position: Midfielder

Senior career*
| Years | Team | Apps | (Gls) |
| 1993–1997 | Dragons de l'Oueme | | |
| 1997 | Julius Berger Lagos | | |
| 1997–1998 | Metz B | 14 | (7) |
| 1998–2005 | Energie Cottbus | 120 | (12) |
| 2009–2010 | Dragons de l'Oueme | 21 | (0) |

International career
| 1993–2004 | Benin | 21 | (6) |

Managerial career
- 2009–2015: Dragons de l'Oueme (assistant)
- 2015–2022: Cercle Mbéri Sportif
- 2022-2023: Benin (caretaker)
- 2023-2024: Benin (assistant)
- * Club domestic league appearances and goals

Moussa Latoundji (born 13 August 1978) is a Beninese former football player and current assistant manager for Benin national football team.

== Club career ==
Born in Porto-Novo, Latoudji started his career in his native Benin with amateur side Dragons de l'Oueme. He earned a move to Nigerian side Julius Berger in 1997. He again impressed, and was signed by professional French team FC Metz, where he spent one season with the club's 'B' team, amassing 14 appearances and 7 goals.

He was then signed by German side FC Energie Cottbus. After over 100 appearances for the club, Latoundji broke his kneecap in 2004, and never played for the club again.

He returned to Benin in 2009, coming out of retirement to act as player-manager for the side where he first began his career, Dragons de l'Oueme. After six years, he left to manage Gabonese side Cercle Mbéri Sportif.

== International career ==
Latoundji made his international debut on 17 January 1993 against Tunisia, making him the third youngest ever international male footballer. He was part of the Beninese 2004 African Nations Cup team, which finished bottom of its group in the first round of competition, thus failing to secure qualification for the quarter-finals. Latoundji achieved the distinction, however, of scoring Benin's only goal. He did this in the ninetieth minute of his team's final game in the competition, a 2–1 victory for Nigeria.
