= Soleil FC =

Beninese football club

- Full name: Soleil Football Club
- Ground: Stade René Pleven d'Akpakpa, Cotonou, Benin
- Capacity: 15,000

Soleil FC is a Beninese football club based in Cotonou. They most recently competed in the Benin Premier League in the 2023-24 season. As of 2025, they were playing in the Ligue Amateur du Bénin, in Pool B.
