= AS Police (Benin) =

Beninese football club

Police
- Full name: AS Police (Benin)
- Ground: Stade Cotonou II; Porto-Novo, Benin
- Capacity: 6,000
- League: Benin Premier League
- 2013: 6

AS Police is a football club in Benin, playing in the town of Porto-Novo. They play in the Beninese first division, the Benin Premier League.

== Stadium ==
Currently the team plays at the 6,000 capacity Stade Cotonou II.

== League participations ==
- Benin Premier League: 2012–
- Benin Second Division: ?-2012
