= Avrankou Omnisport FC =

Beninese football club

- Full name: Avrankou Omnisport Football Club
- Ground: Stade Municipal de Avrankou, Avrankou
- Capacity: 5,000
- Manager: Bruno Adoula Goudjo
- League: Benin Premier League
- 2013–14: 5th

Avrankou Omnisport FC are a Beninese football club based in Avrankou. They currently play in the Benin Premier League for 2014–15 season.
