= Stade René Pleven d'Akpakpa =

Sports stadium in Cotonou, Benin

René Pleven d'Akpakpa Stadium
- Stade René Pleven d'Akpakpa
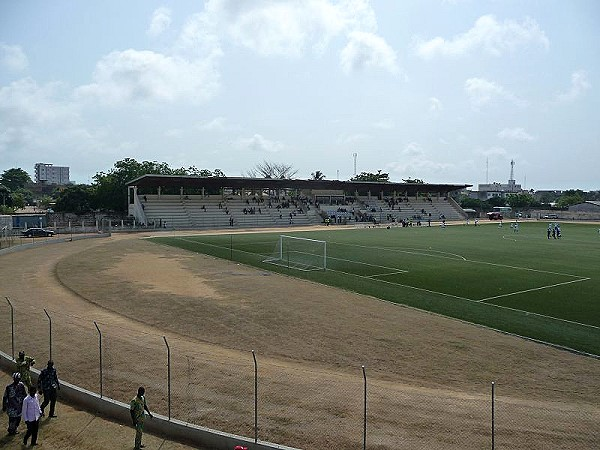

- Benin
- Location: Cotonou, Littoral, Benin
- Coordinates: 6°21′59″N 2°26′56″E
- Capacity: 15,000
- Type: Stadium

Stade René Pleven d'Akpakpa is a multi-use stadium in Cotonou, Littoral Department, Benin. It is currently used mostly for football matches and is used as the home stadium of Requins de l'Atlantique FC. The stadium has a capacity of 15,000 people.
