= JA Cotonou =

Beninese football club

- Full name: Jeunesse Athlétique du Cotonou
- Ground: Stade Jean-Pierre Gascon; Cotonou, Benin
- Capacity: 5,000
- League: Benin Premier League
- 2013: 1st

Jeunesse Athlétique du Cotonou is a football club in Benin, playing in the city of Cotonou. They play in the Beninese first division, the Benin Premier League.

The club were previously known as Jeunesse Athlétique du Plateau and played in Pobè, a city in the Plateau Department of Benin.

== Stadium ==
Currently the team plays at the 5,000 capacity Stade Jean-Pierre Gascon.

== Honours ==
=== Domestic ===
- Benin Premier League

(gold) Champions (1): 2012–13
