= Dynamo Abomey FC =

Beninese football club

Dynamo FC
- Full name: Dynamo Abomey Football Club
- Ground: Stade Goho; Abomey, Benin
- Capacity: 7500
- League: Benin Premier League
- 2025–2026: 6th

Dynamo Abomey FC are a Beninese football club based in Abomey. They last played in the Benin Premier League during the abandoned 2010/11 season.
