= Espoir FC (Benin) =

Beninese football club

- Full name: Espoir Football Club
- Ground: Municipal de Savalou, Savalou
- Capacity: 1,500
- Manager: Patrice Lair
- League: Benin Premier League
- 2025–2026: 8th

Espoir FC are a Beninese football club based in Savalou. As of 2026, they play in the Benin Premier League.
