= ASPAC FC =

Beninese football club

- Full name: Association Sportive du Port Autonome de Cotonou FC
- Nicknames: Les Bleus et blancs (The Blue and Whites); Les portuaires (The harbours)
- Founded: 1968; 58 years ago
- Ground: Stade Charles de Gaulle; Cotonou
- Capacity: 15,000
- Chairman: Wahabou Adam Chabi
- Manager: Alain Gaspoz
- League: Benin Premier League
- 2025–26: 3rd

ASPAC FC are a Beninese football club based in Cotonou. They currently play in the Benin Premier League. In 2010, the club won the Benin Premier League title for the first time in their history.

== Achievements ==
- Benin Premier League: 2

2010, 2012

- Benin Cup: 1

2008

== Performance in CAF competitions ==
- CAF Champions League: 2 appearances
  - 2011: First Round
  - 2013: Preliminary Round
- CAF Confederation Cup: 1 appearance
  - 2026–27: Preliminary Round (qualified)

== Notable players ==
- (Benin) Raimi Kola

== Managers ==
- (France) Jean Marc Nobilo
- (Switzerland) (Benin) Alain Gaspoz (2009–)
