= Panthères FC =

Beninese football club

- Full name: Panthères Football Club
- Founded: 1988
- Ground: Stade Municipal de Djougou, Djougou
- Capacity: 3,400
- League: Benin Premier League
- 2013–14: 2nd

Panthères Football Club are a Beninese football club based in Djougou. They currently play in the Benin Premier League for 2014–15 season.

The club was founded in 1988.
