= USS Kraké =

Beninese football club

- Full name: Union Sportive Seme Kraké
- Ground: Stade Cotonou II, Porto-Novo, Benin
- Capacity: 6,000
- Manager: Thomas Nana Ampomah
- League: Benin Premier League
- 2025–26: 14th

Union Sportive Seme Kraké are a Beninese football club based in Porto-Novo. They currently play in the Benin Premier League for 2014–15 season.

== Performance in CAF competitions ==
- CAF Confederation Cup: 1 appearance

2011 – Preliminary Round

== Managers ==
- (Benin) Raoul Zamba (2006)
- (Ghana) Johnson Ampomah (2007–09)
- (Ghana) Thomas Nana Ampomah (2009)
- (France) Jules Accorsi (2009–10)
- (Benin) Moussa Latoundji (2010–)
