= Energie FC =

Beninese football club

Energie
- Full name: Energie Football Club
- Ground: Stade Saint-Louis; Seme-Kpodji, Benin
- Capacity: 3,000
- League: Benin Premier League

Energie FC is a professional football club based in Seme-Kpodji, Benin. They currently play in the Benin Premier League. In 1997, the club won the Benin Cup.

== Stadium ==
Currently the team plays at the 3,000 capacity Stade Saint-Louis.

== Honours ==
- Benin Cup
  - Winners (1): 1997
