= AS Oussou Saka =

Beninese football club

ASOS
- Full name: Association Sportive Oussou Saka
- Ground: Stade Charles de Gaulle; Porto-Novo, Benin
- Capacity: 35,000
- League: Benin Premier League
- 2013–14: 12th
Home colours	Away colours

Association Sportive Oussou Saka is a football club in Benin, playing in the town of Porto-Novo. They play in the Beninese first division, the Benin Premier League.

== Stadium ==
Currently, the team plays at the 35,000 capacity Stade Charles de Gaulle.

== League participations ==
- Benin Premier League: 2011–
- Benin Second Division: ????–2011
