= Requins de l'Atlantique FC =

Beninese football club

Requins de l'Atlantique
- Full name: Requins de l'Atlantique Football Club
- Founded: 1977
- Ground: Stade René Pleven d'Akpakpa, Cotonou, Benin
- Capacity: 15,000
- League: Benin Premier League

Requins de l'Atlantique Football Club is a professional football club of Benin, playing in the town of Cotonou. They play in the Beninese first division, the Benin Premier League. The club was founded in 1977.

== Achievements ==
- Benin Premier League: 3

1985, 1987, 1990

- Benin Cup: 5

1978, 1981, 1983, 1988, 1989
