= Les Buffles du Borgou =

Beninese football club

- Full name: Les Buffles Football Club du Borgou
- Founded: 1976
- Ground: Stade Municipal de Parakou; Parakou, Benin
- Capacity: 8,000
- Manager: Xavier Bernain
- League: Benin Premier League
- 2025–26: 5th
Home colours

Les Buffles Football Club du Borgou, famously known as Les Buffles du Borgou, is a Beninese professional football club based in Parakou, that competes in the Benin Premier League.

== History ==
The club was founded on 1976 in Paraku under the name of Association Sportive Buffles FC du Borgou after the merger of the two major clubs of the city.

=== Crest ===
Old logo

Present logo

== Achievements ==
- Benin Premier League: 5

Champions: 1980, 1992, 2014, 2017, 2019.

- Benin Cup: 3

Winners: 1979, 1982, 2001.
Runners-up: 2000.

- Benin Supercup: 1

Winners: 2014.

== Performance in CAF competitions ==
- CAF Champions League / African Cup of Champions Clubs: 4 appearances

1993: withdraw
2015: Preliminary round
2018: Preliminary round
2020: Preliminary Round
2021: Preliminary Round

- CAF Cup Winners' Cup: 1 appearance

1983: First Round

== Notable players ==
- (Benin) Raimi Kola
- (Benin) Abdel-Djalil Bawa
- (Benin) Adjai Moussa

== Notable coaches ==
- (Togo) Mohamed Abdoulaye
