= Benin Premier League =

- Founded: 1969
- Country: Benin
- Confederation: CAF
- Number of clubs: 36
- Level on pyramid: 1
- Relegation to: Benin Second Division
- Domestic cup: Benin Cup
- International cup(s): Champions League; Confederation Cup
- Current champions: Sobemap FC (2025–26)
- Most championships: AS Dragons FC de l'Ouémé (12)
- Current: 2025–26 Benin Premier League

The Benin Premier League, also called Championnat National du Bénin in French, is the highest football division in Benin. The league was held in 1969 for the first time. Currently, the initial round is a double round-robin tournament, with 36 clubs being divided in 4 groups, and 9 clubs in each. The last 5 teams of each group, goes to the relegation round, which consists on 2 groups of 10 teams. The first 4 teams of each group goes to the final stage with 16 clubs playing a single round-robin tournament. The winner of this round (and of the Premier League) earns a place in the CAF Champions League.

== 2021–22 season teams ==
=== Group A ===
- Béké FC de Bembèrèkè (Bembèrèkè)
- Buffles du Borgou FC (Parakou)
- Cavaliers FC (Nikki)
- Damissa FC (Nikki)
- Dynamique Djougou (Djougou)
- Dynamo Parakou (Parakou)
- Real Sport de Parakou FC (Parakou)
- Panthères FC (Djougou)
- Takunnin FC (Kandi)

=== Group B ===
- Dadje FC (Aplahoué)
- Dynamo Abomey FC (Abomey)
- Energie FC (Sèmè-Kpodji)
- FC Loto (Sakété)
- Espoir FC (Savalou)
- Hodio FC (Comè)
- Soleil FC (Cotonou)
- Tonnerre d'Abomey FC (Bohicon)
- US Baboni (Parakou)

=== Group C ===
- Ajijas Cotonou (Cotonou)
- AS Cotonou (Cotonou)
- ASPAC FC (Cotonou)
- AS Police FC (Porto-Novo)
- Coton FC de Ouidah (Ouidah)
- Eternel (Cotonou)
- Requins de l'Atlantique FC (Cotonou)
- Sitatunga FC (Abomey-Calavi)
- UPI-ONM FC (Cotonou)

=== Group D ===
- AS Dragons FC de l'Ouémé (Porto-Novo)
- AS Sobemap Sport (Porto-Novo)
- ASVO FC (Porto-Novo)
- ASOS (Porto-Novo)
- Avrankou Omnisport FC (Avrankou)
- Ayema (Sèmè-Kpodji)
- Djèffa FC (Sèmè-Kpodji)
- JA Cotonou (Cotonou)
- JS Pobè (Pobè)

ASPAC and Takunnin played in the final of the league. Takunnin won the final.

== Final clubs' stadiums ==
Team	Location	Stadium	Capacity
ASPAC FC	Cotonou	Stade Charles de Gaulle	15,000
Takunnin	Kandi	Stade Saka Kina Guézéré	1,000

== Previous champions ==
- 1969: FAD Cotonou
- 1970: AS Porto-Novo
- 1971: AS Cotonou
- 1972: AS Porto-Novo
- 1973: AS Porto-Novo
- 1974: Etoile Sportive Porto-Novo
- no championship between 1975 and 1977
- 1978: Dragons de l'Ouémé
- 1979: Dragons de l'Ouémé
- 1980: Buffles du Borgou
- 1981: Ajijas Cotonou
- 1982: Dragons de l'Ouémé
- 1983: Dragons de l'Ouémé
- 1984: Lions de l'Atakory
- 1985: Requins de l'Atlantique
- 1986: Dragons de l'Ouémé
- 1987: Requins de l'Atlantique
- 1988: no championship
- 1989: Dragons de l'Ouémé
- 1990: Requins de l'Atlantique
- 1991: Postel Sport
- 1992: Buffles du Borgou
- 1993: Dragons de l'Ouémé
- 1994: Dragons de l'Ouémé
- 1995: Toffa Cotonou
- 1996: Mogas 90
- 1997: Mogas 90
- 1998: Dragons de l'Ouémé
- 1999: Dragons de l'Ouémé
- no official championship between 2000 and 2001
- 2001–02: Dragons de l'Ouémé
- 2003: Dragons de l'Ouémé
- 2004: not finished
- 2005: no championship
- 2005–06: Mogas 90
- 2007: Tonnerre d'Abomey
- 2008–09: declared invalid
- 2009: no competition
- 2009–10: ASPAC
- 2010–11: suspended
- 2011–12: ASPAC
- 2012–13: Jeunesse Athlétique du Plateau
- 2013–14: Buffles du Borgou
- 2014–15: abandoned
- 2016: abandoned
- 2017: Buffles du Borgou
- 2018–19: Buffles du Borgou
- 2019–20: abandoned
- 2020–21: Loto-Popo FC
- 2021–22: Coton
- 2022–23: Coton
- 2023–24: Coton
- 2024–25: Dadje FC
- 2025–26: Sobemap FC

== Performance by club ==
Club	Titles	Last title
Dragons de l'Ouémé	12	2003
Buffles du Borgou	5	2019
Mogas 90	3	2006
Requins de l'Atlantique	3	1990
AS Porto-Novo	3	1973
ASPAC	2	2012
Coton	2	2023
Sobemap FC	1	2026
Dadje FC	1	2025
Loto-Popo	1	2021
Jeunesse Athlétique du Plateau	1	2013
Tonnerre d'Abomey	1	2007
Toffa Cotonou	1	1995
Postel Sport	1	1991
Lions de l'Atakory	1	1984
Ajijas Cotonou	1	1981
Etoile Sportive Porto-Novo	1	1974
AS Cotonou	1	1971
FAD Cotonou	1	1969

== Top goalscorers ==
Season	Player	Team	Goals
2019–20	(Nigeria) Henry Uche	Espoir Savalou	19
2021	(Nigeria) Henry Uche	Espoir Savalou	19
2021–22	(Nigeria) Henry Uche	Espoir Savalou	17
2022–23	(Burkina Faso) Issah Razack Benín	Coton	16
2023–24	(Guinea) Moussa Traore	Bani Gansé	19

Most time goalscorers

- 3 times
  - (Nigeria) Henry Uche (2019-20, 2021, 2021-22)
