= Ayema FC =

Beninese football club

- Full name: Ayema Football Club
- Ground: Stade miserete Porto-Novo, Benin
- Capacity: 3,000
- League: Benin Premier League
- 2025–26: 12th

Ayema Football Club is a football club in Porto-Novo, Benin. They currently play in the Benin Premier League.

== Stadium ==
Currently the team plays at the 3,000 capacity Stade Saint-Louis.
