= AS Dragons FC de l'Ouémé =

Beninese football club

Dragons
- Full name: Association Sportive Dragons FC de l'Ouémé
- Founded: 1972
- Ground: Stade Charles de Gaulle; Porto-Novo, Benin
- Capacity: 15,000
- Manager: Lafiou Yessoufou
- League: Benin Premier League
- 2025–2026: 15th
Home colours

The Association Sportive Dragons FC de l'Ouémé, known as Dragons de l'Ouémé, is a Beninese professional football club based in the city of Porto-Novo. They play in the Beninese first division, the Benin Premier League.

The club was founded in 1972.

== Achievements ==
- Benin Premier League: 12

1978, 1979, 1982, 1983, 1986, 1989, 1993, 1994, 1998, 1999, 2002, 2003

- Benin Cup: 6

1984, 1985, 1986, 1990, 2006, 2011

- Benin Independence Cup: 1

2000

- African Cup Winners Cup

1987: Semi-finals

== Performance in CAF competitions ==
- CAF Champions League: 4 appearances

1999: Preliminary Round
2000: First Round
2003: Preliminary Round
2004: First Round

- African Cup of Champions Clubs: 7 appearances

1979: First Round
1980: First Round
1983: First Round

1984: Second Round
1990: Preliminary Round
1994: First Round

1995: First Round

- CAF Confederation Cup: 2 appearances

2007: Preliminary Round
2012:

- CAF Cup Winners' Cup: 7 appearances

1985: Quarter-finals
1986: First Round
1987: Semi-finals

1988: First Round
1991: First Round
1993: Second Round

1998: First Round

- CAF Cup: 3 appearances

1992: Second Round
1996: First Round
1997: Preliminary Round

== Current squad ==
Squad for the 2019–20 Benin Premier League

Note: Flags indicate national team as defined under FIFA eligibility rules; some limited exceptions apply. Players may hold more than one non-FIFA nationality.

No.	Pos.	Nation	Player
—	GK	BEN	Nestor Degbogbahoun
—	GK	BEN	Abiola Katchon
—	DF	BEN	Jean Ogouchi
—	DF	BEN	Cyrille Aloya
—	DF	TOG	Junior Dogbatse
—	DF	BEN	Chams-Deen Chaona
—	DF	BEN	Kisito Atangana
—	DF	TOG	Éric Ayaovi
—	DF	BEN	Luc Bia
—	MF	BEN	Latifou Tadjou
—	MF	BEN	Dominique Fansoaye

No.	Pos.	Nation	Player
—	MF	BEN	Pavleck Ehoue
—	MF	BEN	Ahmed Yessoufou
—	MF	GHA	Koomson Biney
—	MF	BEN	Djamal Fassassi
—	FW	TOG	Folly Gbadoegan
—	FW	BEN	Yaya Ahimane
—	FW	TOG	Anthonio Savant
—	FW	BEN	David Tchetchao
—	FW	NGR	Christopher Elijah
—	FW	BEN	Djibril Tossou
—	FW	BEN	Amadou Moustafirou

== The 1987 African Cup Winners Cup Epopee ==
In 1987, the Dragons de l'Oueme, led by a Dream Team composed of Abédi Pelé, Peter Rufai, Gangbo Bashirou, Kingston Ashabi and with the vision and ambition of late Gbadamassi Moucharaf (then club chairman) reached the semi-finals at the African Cup Winners Cup. In the semi-finals, the Dragons de l'Oueme lost by 2–3 to Gor Mahia of Kenya.

== Managers ==
- (Benin) Moussa Latoundji (1995)
- (Ghana) Karim Abdul Razak (1999–2000)
