= Stade Charles de Gaulle =

Stadium in Porto-Novo, Benin

Charles de Gaulle Stadium
- Stade Charles-de-Gaulle
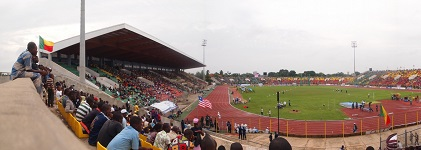

- Benin
- Address: Porto-Novo, Ouémé, Benin
- Coordinates: 6°28′40″N 2°37′07″E
- Capacity: 15,000
- Type: Stadium

Tenant
- AS Dragons FC de l'Ouémé

Stade Charles de Gaulle is a multi-use stadium in Porto-Novo, Benin, named after Charles de Gaulle. It is currently used mostly for football matches and is used as the home stadium of AS Dragons FC de l'Ouémé, Aiglons FC. The stadium has a capacity of 15,000 people.
