= List of football clubs in Togo =

The following is an incomplete list of association football clubs based in Togo. For a complete list see Category:Football clubs in Togo

== A ==
- Abou Ossé FC
- AC Merlan
- AC Semassi F.C.
- Anges de Notsè
- AS Douanes (Lomé)
- AS Togo-Port
- ASKO Kara

== D ==
- Doumbé FC
- Dynamic Togolais

== E ==
- Espoir Tsevie
- Étoile Filante (Lomé)

== F ==
- Foadam Dapaong
- Foadan FC

== G ==
- Gbikinti FC de Bassar
- Gomido FC

== K ==
- Kakadlé FC
- Korikossa Atakpame
- Kotoko FC

== M ==
- Maranatha FC

== O ==
- OC Agaza

== R ==
- RC Lomé

== S ==
- Sara Sport de Bafilo

== T ==
- Tchaoudjo AC
- Togo Telecom FC

== U ==
- Unisport de Sokodé
- US Kokori
- US Masséda
