= 2018–19 Togolese Championnat National =

Togolese Championnat National
- Season: 2018–19

The 2018–19 Togolese Championnat National is the 49th season of the Togolese Championnat National, the top-tier football league in Togo, since its establishment in 1961 following independence. The season started on 22 September 2018.

== League table ==
Pos	Team	Pld	W	D	L	GF	GA	GD	Pts	Qualification or relegation
1	ASC Kozah (C)	26	14	5	7	33	18	+15	47	Qualification for Champions League
2	Maranatha (Q)	26	11	7	8	23	25	−2	40 (Note: Head-to-head Pts (GF–GA): Maranatha 4 (1–0), Gomido 1 (0–1).)	Qualification for Confederation Cup
3	Gomido	26	9	13	4	24	15	+9	40	
4	Dynamic Togolais	26	10	9	7	23	18	+5	39 (Note: Head-to-head Pts (GF–GA): Dynamic Togolais 4 (2–1), Anges 1 (1–2).)	
5	Anges	26	11	6	9	23	23	0	39	
6	Sara Sport	26	9	9	8	20	21	−1	36	
7	AS OTR	26	9	8	9	27	28	−1	35 (Note: Head-to-head Pts (GF–GA): AS OTR 4 (4–2), US Koroki 1 (2–4).)	
8	US Koroki	26	9	8	9	23	23	0	35	
9	AS Togo-Port	26	10	4	12	31	31	0	34 (Note: Head-to-head Pts (GF–GA): AS Togo-Port 3 (3–1), ASKO Kara 3 (1–3).)	
10	ASKO	26	8	10	8	26	26	0	34	
11	AC Semassi	26	9	6	11	26	28	−2	33	
12	Gbohloé-su des Lacs	26	8	8	10	17	18	−1	32	
13	Gbikinti de Bassar	26	6	9	11	25	33	−8	27	Relegation
14	Foadan	26	4	8	14	19	33	−14	20	Relegation

Source: Soccerway
Rules for classification: 1) points; 2) head-to-head points; 3) head-to-head goal difference; 4) head-to-head goals scored; 5) goal difference; 6) goals scored;.
(C) Champions; (Q) Qualified for the phase indicated

== Stadiums ==
Team	Location	Stadium	Capacity
ASC Kozah	Kara	Stade Municipal (Kara)	10,000
Maranatha FC	Kpalimé	Stade Général Ameyi	5,000
Gomido FC	Kpalimé	Stade Municipal (Kpalimé)	10,000
Dynamic Togolais	Lomé	Stade Agoè-Nyivé	2,000
Anges FC	Notsé	Stade Municipal	1,000
Sara Sport FC	Bafilo	Stade Municipal Bafilo	1,000
AS OTR	Lomé	Stade Agoè-Nyivé	2,000
US Koroki	Tchamba	Stade Maman N'Danida	5,000
AS Togo-Port	Lomé	Stade Agoè-Nyivé	2,000
ASKO	Kara	Stade Municipal (Kara)	10,000
AC Semassi FC	Sokodé	Stade Municipal (Sokodé)	10,000
Gbohloé-su des Lacs	Aného	Stade de Boka	10,000
Gbikinti FC de Bassar	Bassar	Stade de Bassar	1,000
Foadan FC	Dapaong	Stade Municipal	1,000

== Attendances ==
The average league attendance was 505:

#	Club	Average
1	ASC Kozah	831
2	ASKO	813
3	AC Semassi	810
4	Dynamic togolais	792
5	Gbohloé-Su des Lacs	724
6	US Koroki	461
7	Maranatha FC	433
8	AS Togo-Port	422
9	Anges FC	403
10	Gomido FC	374
11	AS OTR	292
12	Sara Sport	253
13	Gbikinti de Bassar	236
14	Foadan FC	221
