= 2017–18 Togolese Championnat National =

Football competition

Togolese Championnat National
- Season: 2017–18
- Champions: US Koroki

The 2017–18 Togolese Championnat National season is the 48th edition (since independence) of the top level of football competition in Togo. It began on 18 November 2017 and ended on 30 June 2018.

== Standings ==
Final table.

Pos	Team	Pld	W	D	L	GF	GA	GD	Pts	Qualification or relegation
1	US Koroki	30	17	7	6	28	13	+15	58	Champions
2	Gomido FC de Kpalimé	30	15	11	4	39	17	+22	56	
3	AC Sèmassi de Sokodé	30	16	7	7	38	20	+18	55	
4	AS Togo-Port	30	15	7	8	38	26	+12	52	
5	Dynamic Togolais	30	13	8	9	39	29	+10	47	
6	AS OTR (Lomé)	30	13	7	10	37	29	+8	46	
7	ASC Kara de Kara	30	12	8	10	35	30	+5	44	
8	Maranatha FC de Fiokpo (Womé)	30	12	8	10	31	29	+2	44	
9	Anges FC de Notsè	30	12	4	14	23	30	−7	40	
10	Gbikinti de Bassar	30	7	16	7	26	25	+1	37	
11	ASKO de Kara	30	10	5	15	24	35	−11	35	
12	Foadan FC de Dapaong	30	8	9	13	20	26	−6	33	
13	Unisport de Sokodé	30	7	10	13	24	33	−9	31	Relegation to lower division
14	Espoir FC de Tsévié	30	7	10	13	22	34	−12	31	Relegation to lower division
15	OC Agaza de Lomé	30	6	8	16	17	35	−18	26	Relegation to lower division
16	Kotoko FC de Lavié	30	3	9	18	15	45	−30	18	Relegation to lower division

Updated to match(es) played on unknown. Source:

== See also ==
- 2018 Coupe du Togo
