= 2009 Togolese Championnat National =

Togolese Championnat National
- Season: 2009
- Champions: ASKO Kara
- Relegated: Togo Telecom F.C. AS Togo-Port; Foadan; AC Merlan

The 2009 Togolese Championnat National is the forty-eighth season of the Togolese Championnat National since its establishment in 1961. A total of 16 teams are contesting the league.

== Participating teams ==
Location of teams

Team	Location	Stadium	Capacity
AC Merlan	Lomé	Oscar Anthony	10,000
Étoile Filante de Lomé	Lomé	Oscar Anthony	10,000
AS Togo-Port	Lomé	Agoè-Nyivé	10,000
AS Douanes	Lomé	Agoè-Nyivé	10,000
Dynamic Togolais	Lomé	Agoè-Nyivé	10,000
Togo Telecom F.C.	Lomé	Général Eyadema	15,000
AC Semassi F.C.	Sokodé	Municipal	10,000
Tchaoudjo Athlétic Club	Sokodé	Municipal	10,000
US Koroki	Tchamba		
Maranatha	Womé	Général Ameyi	5,000
Abou Ossé	Anié	Municipal	5,000
Gomido	Kpalimé	Municipal	10,000
ASKO Kara	Kara	Municipal	10,000
Foadan	Dapaong		
US Masséda	Masséda	Municipal	10,000
Kotoko F.C.	Lavié	Municipal	5,000

== League table ==
Pos	Team	Pld	W	D	L	GF	GA	GD	Pts
1	ASKO	30	18	9	3	39	12	+27	63
2	Maranatha (Note: Maranatha had points removed for a complication regarding the registration of one of their players and were relegated. They are fighting the decision at the Court of Arbitration for Sport.)	30	17	6	7	39	22	+17	57
3	Gomido	30	13	13	4	29	10	+19	52
4	Dynamic Togolais	30	12	10	8	27	21	+6	46
5	AC Semassi F.C.	30	11	12	7	24	20	+4	45
6	Étoile Filante	30	10	13	7	30	22	+8	43
7	AS Douanes	30	10	11	9	22	18	+4	41
8	Kotoko FC	30	10	10	10	22	23	−1	40
9	Abou Ossé	30	9	11	10	21	22	−1	38
10	US Masséda	30	11	5	14	23	33	−10	38
11	US Koroki	30	8	12	10	27	27	0	36
12	Tchaoudjo AC	30	8	11	11	28	31	−3	35
13	Togo Telecom	30	7	9	14	18	38	−20	30
14	AS Togo-Port	30	6	10	14	26	41	−15	28
15	Foadan	30	5	10	15	14	28	−14	25
16	AC Merlan	30	5	8	17	17	38	−21	23

Source: rsssf.com
Rules for classification: 1) points; 2) goal difference; 3) number of goals scored.
