= 2016–17 Togolese Championnat National =

Togolese Championnat National
- Season: 2016–17
- Champions: AS Togo-Port

The 2016–17 Togolese Championnat National season was the top level of football competition in Togo after being cancelled in 2015. It began on 11 September 2016 and concluded on 28 May 2017.

== Standings ==
Pos	Club	Pld	W	D	L	GF–GA	GD	Pts	Notes
1	AS Togo-Port	26	14	6	6	39–17	+22	48	Champions
2	AC Sèmassi	26	12	10	4	29–19	+10	46	
3	Maranatha FC	26	11	7	8	25–30	−5	40	
4	US Koroki	26	10	9	7	22–21	+1	39	
5	Dynamic Togolais FC	26	9	10	7	27–22	+5	37	
6	Unisport FC	26	10	7	9	25–23	+2	37	
7	Foadan FC	26	9	9	8	24–20	+4	36	
8	AS OTR	26	9	9	8	24–21	+3	36	
9	ASKO de Kara	26	9	8	9	28–29	−1	35	
10	Gbikinti de Bassar	26	7	13	6	31–21	+10	34	
11	Gomido FC	26	8	10	8	25–17	+8	34	Relegated
12	OC Agaza	26	9	6	11	23–30	−7	33	Relegated
13	Anges FC de Notsè	26	9	4	13	23–35	−12	31	Relegated
14	Kotoko de Laviè	26	0	4	22	8–48	−40	4	Relegated
