= 2022–23 Togolese Championnat National =

Togolese Championnat National
- Season: 2022–23
- Champions: ASKO FC
- Matches: 240
- Goals: 450 (1.88 per match)
- Top goalscorer: Yéré Justin (ASKO FC, 17 goals)
- Highest attendance: 2,000 ASKO FC

The 2022–23 Togolese Championnat National was a top-flight football season in Togo.

ASKO FC were crowned Togolese champions after finishing the season without conceding a loss. Sara FC and Anges de Notse were relegated with more than one round to spare.

Yéré Justin was the league's top scorer, with 17 goals, with Napo Germain Sonyahe from Dynamic Togolais as the runner-up.

== League Table ==
| Pos | Team | Pld | W | D | L | GF | GA | GD | Pts | Qualification or relegation |
|---|---|---|---|---|---|---|---|---|---|---|
| 1 | ASKO FC (C) | 30 | 19 | 11 | 0 | 44 | 14 | +30 | 68 | Champions, Qualification to the 2023–24 CAF Champions League |
| 2 | ASC Kara | 30 | 18 | 8 | 4 | 44 | 18 | +26 | 62 | Qualification to the 2023–24 CAF Confederation Cup |
| 3 | Dynamic Togolais | 30 | 13 | 11 | 6 | 30 | 16 | +14 | 50 | |
| 4 | Gbohloé-su des Lacs | 30 | 12 | 10 | 8 | 34 | 27 | +7 | 46 | |
| 5 | OTR | 30 | 10 | 13 | 7 | 30 | 25 | +5 | 43 | |
| 6 | AC Semassi | 30 | 10 | 11 | 9 | 26 | 22 | +4 | 41 | |
| 7 | Binah | 30 | 8 | 15 | 7 | 21 | 17 | +4 | 39 | |
| 8 | Tambo | 30 | 10 | 8 | 12 | 35 | 37 | −2 | 38 | |
| 9 | Espoir | 30 | 8 | 13 | 9 | 28 | 30 | −2 | 37 | |
| 10 | Unisport | 30 | 9 | 9 | 12 | 26 | 35 | −9 | 36 | |
| 11 | Gomido FC | 30 | 7 | 12 | 11 | 22 | 29 | −7 | 33 | |
| 12 | Barracuda | 30 | 6 | 13 | 11 | 21 | 29 | −8 | 31 | |
| 13 | Entente II | 30 | 6 | 13 | 11 | 27 | 39 | −12 | 31 | |
| 14 | Kakadl | 30 | 7 | 10 | 13 | 17 | 31 | −14 | 31 | |
| 15 | Anges FC (R) | 30 | 6 | 7 | 17 | 25 | 41 | −16 | 25 | Relegation |
| 16 | Sara Sport FC (R) | 30 | 5 | 8 | 17 | 20 | 40 | −20 | 23 | Relegation |

Rules for classification: 1) points; 2) goal difference; 3) number of goals scored.
(C) Champions; (R) Relegated
