= Ali Khaddafi =

Togolese footballer

Personal information
- Full name: Ali Khaddafi
- Date of birth: 7 July 1984
- Place of birth: Lomé, Togo
- Date of death: 19 October 2015 (aged 31)
- Height: 1.82 m (5 ft 11 1/2 in)
- Position: Midfielder

Youth career
- 1994–2001: OC Agaza

Senior career*
| Years | Team | Apps | (Gls) |
| 2001–2002 | OC Agaza | 20 | (2) |
| 2002–2003 | AS Togo-Port | 22 | (2) |
| 2003–2007 | AS Douanes | 60 | (8) |
| 2007–2009 | PSM Makassar | 58 | (8) |
| 2009–2011 | Bontang | 55 | (6) |
| 2011–2012 | PSPS Pekanbaru | 30 | (2) |
| 2012–2013 | Sriwijaya | 28 | (1) |
| 2013–2014 | Persepam Pamekasan | 16 | (0) |
| 2014–2015 | Perseru Serui | 20 | (3) |
| Total | | 309 | (32) |

International career
| 2004 | Togo | 2 | (0) |
- * Club domestic league appearances and goals

Ali Khaddafi (7 July 1984 – 19 October 2015) was a Togolese former footballer who played as a midfielder.

== Honours ==
AS Douanes

Winner

- Togolese Championnat National: 2004–05
- Coupe du Togo: 2004

Sriwijaya

Winner

- Indonesian Inter Island Cup: 2012
