= Gnama Akaté =

Togolese footballer

Personal information
- Date of birth: 25 November 1991 (age 34)
- Place of birth: Defale, Togo
- Height: 1.76 m (5 ft 9 in)
- Position: Midfielder

Team information
- Current team: Baladiyat Al-Mosul

Senior career*
Years	Team	Apps	(Gls)
2006–2009	Masséda		
2009–2010	Douanes		
2010–2011	Tonnerre d'Abomey		
2011–2013	El Jaish	0	(0)
2013–2015	Dynamic Togolais		
2015–2016	Agaza		
2016–2018	Al Nabi Chit	29	(4)
2018–2019	Togo-Port		
2019–2020	United Victory		
2020–	ASKO Kara		

International career^{‡}
2015–	Togo	15	(1)
- * Club domestic league appearances and goals as of 17:11, 29 March 2022 (UTC) ‡ National team caps and goals as of August 2026 (UTC)

Gnama Akaté (born 25 November 1991) is a Togolese professional footballer who plays as a midfielder for Iraqi club Baladiyat Al-Mosul and the Togo national team.

== Club career ==
Akaté began his senior career in his native Togo, beginning his career at Masséda, followed by a stint at Douanes. He moved to Benin with Tonnerre d'Abomey, and then Qatar with El Jaish in 2011. He returned to Togo with Dynamic Togolais and Agaza, before moving to the Lebanese club Al Nabi Chit in 2016. He returned to Togo with Togo-Port, then Maldives with United Victory, before finally returning to Togo with ASKO Kara where he helped the club win the 2021 Togolese Championnat National.

== International career ==
Akaté made his debut with the Togo national team in a 2–0 2016 African Nations Championship qualification loss to Niger on 17 October 2015. He captained the Togo squad that helped qualified into the 2020 African Nations Championship.

== Honour ==
ASKO Kara

- Togolese Championnat National: 2021
