= Malian football clubs in African competitions =

Malian football clubs have participated in African football competitions since 1965. In total, Malian clubs have participated in African competitions. The biggest success was the participation of Stade Malien in the finals at the 2009 CAF Confederation Cup and Stade Malien and became the only Malian club to win a continental cup title, later Stade Malien was the only Malian club who appeared in the CAF Super Cup in 2010 where they lost the title to Democratic Congo's TP Mazembe.

Of the continental appearances, Djoliba and Stade Malien are one of the African clubs who appeared the most at continental competitions.

== Appearances in CAF competitions ==
As of March 2017

		CAF Champions League					CAF Confederation Cup					CAF Cup Winners' Cup					CAF Cup					Total			
club	App	Mat	W	D	L	App	Mat	W	D	L	App	Mat	W	D	L	App	Mat	W	D	L	App	Mat	W	D	L
Djoliba AC	19	76				10	53									4	16	6	1	7	33	145			
Stade Malien	22	77	25	18	34	14	38	13	14	13	7	20	6	3	11	1	2	0	1	1	44	137	44	36	58
Real Bamako	8	30	13	7	10	4										0	0	0	0	0	12	40			
CO Bamako	1	2	1	0	1											0	0	0	0	0	6	22			
USFAS Bamako	0	0	0	0	0	3	10	3	3	4						2	4	1	2	1	5	14	4	5	5
Centre Salif Keita																									
Onze Createurs																									
AS Nianan	0	0	0	0	0	1	2	0	1	1	1	4	1	0	3	1	4	2	1	1	3	10	3	2	5
AS Bamako	0	0	0	0	0	1	6	3	2	1	0	0	0	0	0	0	0	0	0	0	1	6	3	2	1
AS Sigui	0	0	0	0	0	1	2	0	2	0	0	0	0	0	0	1	4	1	0	3	2	6	1	2	3
AS Bakaridjan	0	0	0	0	0	1	2	0	2	0	0	0	0	0	0	0	0	0	0	0	1	2	0	2	0
Mamahira AC	0	0	0	0	0	1	2	0	0	2	0	0	0	0	0	0	0	0	0	0	1	2	0	0	2

== African Cup of Champions Clubs/CAF Champions League ==
Season	Club	Round	Opponent	Home	Away	Aggregate
1964–65	Stade Malien	First Round	(Senegal) Espoir de Saint-Louis	4–1	1–1	
1964–65	Stade Malien	Second Round	(Guinea) Sily Club de Kindia	2–0	2–4	
1964–65	Stade Malien	Quarterfinals	(Ivory Coast) ASEC Mimosas	3–3	6–4	
1964–65	Stade Malien	Semifinals	(Ethiopia) Cotton Factory Club	3–1		
1964–65	Stade Malien	Finals	(Cameroon) Oryx Douala	1–2		
1966	Real Bamako	First Round	(Liberia) Invincible Eleven	6–0	2–3	
1966	Real Bamako	Quarterfinals	(Guinea) AS Kaloum Star	2–1	2–3	
1966	Real Bamako	Semifinals	(Ivory Coast) Stade d'Abidjan	3–1	4–1 (aet)	
1966	Real Bamako	Finals	(Morocco) Wydad Casablanca	2–1	3–1	
1967	Djoliba AC	Second Round	(Liberia) Invincible Eleven	w/o		
1967	Djoliba AC	Quarterfinals	(Guinea) Hafia FC	2–1	0–0	
1967	Djoliba AC	Semifinals	(Ghana) Hearts of Oak	1–1	2–1	
1970	Real Bamako	First Round	(Republic of Upper Volta) AS Fonctionnaires	3–0	2–2	
1970	Real Bamako	Second Round	(Ivory Coast) Stade d'Abidjan	2–3	6–2	
1971	Stade Malien	First Round	(Senegal) ASC Diaraf	4–0	0–3	
1971	Stade Malien	Second Round	(Ivory Coast) ASEC Mimosas	2–2	1–2	
1972	Djoliba AC	First Round	(Republic of Upper Volta) ASFA Ouagadougou	1–0	1–3	
1972	Djoliba AC	Second Round	(Senegal) ASFA Dakar	2–0	2–0^{1}	
1972	Djoliba AC	Quarterfinals	(Guinea) Hafia FC	2–1	3–0	
1973	Stade Malien	First Round	(Togo) Modèle de Lomé	2–1	0–0	
1973	Stade Malien	Second Round	AS Vita Club	0–3	1–4	
1974	Djoliba AC	Second Round	(Nigeria) Bendel Insurance	2–0	1–0	
1974	Djoliba AC	Quarterfinals	CARA Brazzaville	0–0	3–0	
1975	Djoliba AC	First Round	(Sierra Leone) Mighty Blackpool	2–0	0–1	
1975	Djoliba AC	Second Round	(Togo) Lomé	1–1	3–2	
1976	Djoliba AC	First Round	(The Gambia) Real de Banjul	2–0	0–2 (a)	
1976	Djoliba AC	Second Round	(Guinea) Hafia FC	2–1	2–0	
1977	Djoliba AC	First Round	(Guinea-Bissau) UDI Bissau	5–0	0–1	
1977	Djoliba AC	Second Round	(Ivory Coast) SC Gagnoa	1–1	1–3	
1977	Djoliba AC	Semifinals	(Togo) Lomé	2–0	1–0^{2}	
1980	Djoliba AC	First Round	(Niger) AS Niamey	2–0	0–1	
1980	Djoliba AC	Second Round	(Ghana) Hearts of Oak	1–1	1–0	
1981	Real Bamako	First Round	(Gabon) US Mbila Nzambi	1–0	1–0 (2–4 p)	
1982	Real Bamako	First Round	Étoile du Congo	1–0	1–1	
1982	Real Bamako	Second Round	(Gabon) USM Libreville	2–0	1–0	
1982	Real Bamako	Quarterfinals	Saint Éloi Lupopo	3–2	2–0	
1983	Djoliba AC	Preliminary Round	(Guinea) Hafia FC	0–0	1–0	
1984	Real Bamako	First Round	Dragons FC de l'Ouémé	2–2	2–0	
1985	Stade Malien	Second Round	(Liberia) Invincible Eleven	1–1	0–3^{3}	
1985	Stade Malien	Quarterfinals	(Algeria) GCR Mascara	2–0	3–0	
1987	Real Bamako	First Round	(Nigeria) Leventis United	0–0	4–0	
1988	Stade Malien	First Round	(Algeria) ES Sétif	1–1	0–4	
1989	Djoliba AC	First Round	(Guinea) Horoya AC	1–0	0–0	
1989	Djoliba AC	Second Round	(Sierra Leone) Mighty Blackpool	0–0	1–2	
1990	Stade Malien	First Round	(Tunisia) Espérance Tunis	0–1	0–2	
1991	Djoliba AC	First Round	(Senegal) ASC Port Autonome	1–0	0–0	
1991	Djoliba AC	Second Round	(Tunisia) Club Africain	0–0	2–0	
1992	Real Bamako	Preliminary Round	(Mauritania) ASC Police	1–1	1–1 (5–4 p)	
1992	Real Bamako	First Round	(Morocco) WAC Casablanca	2–1	2–0	
1993	Djoliba AC	Second Round	(Mauritania) Sonader Ksar	1–0	1–1	
1993	Djoliba AC	Quarterfinals	(Ivory Coast) ASEC Mimosas	1–1	2–0	
1994	Stade Malien	First Round	(Sierra Leone) East End Lions	2–0	2–0 (2–3 p)	
1994	Stade Malien	Second Round	(Tunisia) Espérance Tunis	0–1	3–0	
1995	Stade Malien	First Round	(Guinea) Horoya AC	1–0	1–1	
1995	Stade Malien	Second Round	(Ghana) Goldfields Obuasi	0–0	0–1	
1997	Djoliba AC	First Round	(Tunisia) Club Africain	1–1	3–2	
1998	Djoliba AC	First Round	(Ghana) Hearts of Oak	0–0	1–0	
1999	Djoliba AC	First Round	(Cameroon) Cotonsport Garoua	2–0	3–1 (a)	
1999	Djoliba AC	Second Round	(Morocco) Raja Casablanca	2–1	2–1 (2–4 p)	
2000	Djoliba AC	First Round	(Cameroon) Cotonsport Garoua	2–0	3–1 (a)	
2000	Djoliba AC	Second Round	(Morocco) Raja Casablanca	2–1	2–1 (2–4 p)	
2001	Stade Malien	First Round	(Ivory Coast) ASEC Mimosas	2–0	0–2	
2002	Stade Malien	First Round	(Ghana) Hearts of Oak	3–1	1–1	
2002	Stade Malien	Second Round	(Senegal) Jeanne d'Arc (Dakar)	0–3	1–2	
2003	Stade Malien	First Round	(Republic of the Congo) AS Police (Pointe-Noire)	1–0	2–1	
2003	Stade Malien	Second Round	(Algeria) USM Alger	1–1	2–0	
2004	Stade Malien	Preliminary Round	(Ghana) Hearts of Oak	0–0	0–2	
2005	Djoliba AC	Preliminary Round	(Senegal) ASC Diaraf	1–1	1–0	
2006	Stade Malien	First Round	(Guinea) Satellite FC	3–0	2–2	
2006	Stade Malien	Second Round	(Equatorial Guinea) Renacimiento FC	2–1	1–0 (a)	
2007	Stade Malien	First Round	(Senegal) AS Douanes (Dakar)	1–2	2–0	
2007	Stade Malien	Second Round	(Morocco) Wydad Casablanca	0–0	3–1	
2008	Stade Malien	Preliminary Round	(Angola) Primeiro de Agosto	1–2	0–0	
2010	Djoliba AC	Preliminary Round	(Libya) al-Ahly Benghazi	1–0	0–0	
2010	Djoliba AC	First Round	(Senegal) ASC Linguère	1–0	1–0 (4–3 p)	
2010	Djoliba AC	Second Round	(Democratic Republic of the Congo) TP Mazembe	0–1	3–0	
2011	Djoliba AC	Preliminary Round	(Sierra Leone) East End Lions	2–0	0–2	
2011	Djoliba AC	First Round	(Senegal) ASC Diaraf	1–1	3–0	
2011	Stade Malien	First Round	(Morocco) Raja Casablanca	2–1	1–0 (a)	
2012	Djoliba AC	Preliminary Round	(Uganda) URA SC	2–0	0–2	
2012	Djoliba AC	First Round	(Nigeria) Sunshine Stars	1–1	1–0	
2012	Stade Malien	First Round	(Benin) Tonnerre	5–2	0–0	
2012	Stade Malien	Second Round	(Egypt) al Ahly (Cairo)	1–0	1–3	
2013	Stade Malien	First Round	(Senegal) Casa Sports	2–0	2–1	
2013	Stade Malien	Second Round	(Cameroon) Coton Sport	0–0	0–3	
2014	Stade Malien	Preliminary Round	(São Tomé and Príncipe) Sporting Praia Cruz	5–0	3–2	
2014	Stade Malien	First Round	(Sudan) Al-Hilal Club	0–0	2–0	
2014	AS Real Bamako	Preliminary Round	(Morocco) FAR Rabat	1–1	2–2	3–3 (a)
2014	AS Real Bamako	First Round	(Nigeria) Enyimba	0–1	1–2	2–2 (a)
2014	AS Real Bamako	Second Round	(Tunisia) Espérance de Tunis	1–1	3–0	1–4
2015	CO Bamako	Preliminary Round	(Morocco) Moghreb Tetouan	2–0	3–0	2–3
2015	Stade Malien	Preliminary Round	(Niger) AS GNN	0–0	1–1 (a)	1–1 (a)
2015	Stade Malien	First Round	(Gabon) AS Mangasport	2–1	1–3	5–2
2015	Stade Malien	Second Round	(Democratic Republic of the Congo) TP Mazembe	2–2	2–1	3–4
2016	Onze Créateurs	Preliminary Round	(Libya) al-Ahly Tripoli	1–2	0–0	1–2
2016	Stade Malien	Preliminary Round	(Burkina Faso) RC Bobo Dioulasso	3–1	0–1	4–1
2016	Stade Malien	First Round	(Cameroon) Cotonsport Garoua	2–0	1–0	2–1
2016	Stade Malien	Second Round	(Zambia) ZESCO United	1–3	1–2	2–5
2017	Real Bamako	Preliminary Round	(Nigeria) Rivers United	0–0	0–4	0–4
2017	Stade Malien	First Round	(Liberia) Barrack Young Controllers FC	1–0	0–1 (6–7 p)	1–1p
2018	Stade Malien	Preliminary Round	(Ivory Coast) Williamsville AC	1–1	0–1	1–2
2018	Real Bamako	Preliminary Round	(Nigeria) MFM F.C.	1–1	0–1	1–2
2018-19	Stade Malien	Preliminary Round	(Central African Republic) Stade Centrafricaine	4–0	1–0	5–0
2018-19	Stade Malien	First Round	(Ivory Coast) ASEC Mimosas	0–1	0–1	0–2
2019-20	Stade Malien	Preliminary Round	(Guinea) Horoya AC	1–1	0–1	1–2
2020-21	Stade Malien	Preliminary Round	(Guinea) AS Ashanti Golden Boys	2–0 (awd.)	2–1	4–1
2020-21	Stade Malien	First Round	(Morocco) Wydad AC	1–0	0–3	1–3
2021-22	Stade Malien	First Round	(Burkina Faso) AS SONABEL	3–0	1–0	4–0
2021-22	Stade Malien	Second Round	(Guinea) Horoya AC	1–0	0–3	1–3
2022-23	Djoliba AC	First Round	(Equatorial Guinea) Deportivo Mongomo	5–0	0–2	5–2
2022-23	Djoliba AC	Second Round	(Algeria) CR Belouizdad	2–1	0–2	2–3
2023-24	Real Bamako	First Round	(Cameroon) Coton Sport	0–0	2–0	2–0
2023-24	Real Bamako	Second Round	(Mauritania) FC Nouadhibou	0–3	1–1	1–4
2024-25	Djoliba AC	First Round	(Central African Republic) Red Star de Bangui	0–0	—	w/o
2024-25	Djoliba AC	Second Round	(Togo) ASKO Kara	1–0	1–0	2–0
2024-25	Djoliba AC	Group stage: 4th place	(Tunisia) Espérance Sportive de Tunis	0–1	0–4	
2024-25	Djoliba AC	Group stage: 4th place	(Egypt) Pyramids	0–0	0–6	
2024-25	Djoliba AC	Group stage: 4th place	(Angola) Sagrada Esperança	0–0	0–1	
2025–26	Stade Malien	First Round	(Central African Republic) AS Tempête	2–0	5–0	7–0
2025–26	Stade Malien	Second Round	(Mauritania) FC Nouadhibou	2–0	1–1	3–1
2025–26	Stade Malien	Group stage: 1st place	(Tunisia) Espérance Sportive de Tunis	1–0	0–0	
2025–26	Stade Malien	Group stage: 1st place	(Angola) Petróleos de Luanda	2–0	0–0	
2025–26	Stade Malien	Group stage: 1st place	(Tanzania) Simba	2–1	0–1	
2025–26	Stade Malien	Quarter-finals	(South Africa) Mamelodi Sundowns	2–0	0–3	2–3
2026–27	Stade Malien	First Round	(Cameroon) Colombe Sportive	0–0	0–0	0–0 (3–4 p)
2026–27	Djoliba AC	First Round	(Tunisia) Club Africain	2–2	0–1	2–3

== African (CAF) Cup Winner's Cup/CAF Confederation Cup ==
Season	Club	Round	Opponent	Home	Away	Aggregate
1981	Djoliba AC	First Round	(Ivory Coast) RC Daloa	1–0	2–1 (a)	
1981	Djoliba AC	Second Round	(Togo) AS Semassi	3–0	0–1	
1981	Djoliba AC	Quarterfinals	(Kenya) Gor Mahia FC	2–0	1–0	
1981	Djoliba AC	Semifinals	(Nigeria) Stationery Stores	0–0	1–0	
1982	Djoliba AC	First Round	Requins de l'Atlantique	1–0	0–0	
1982	Djoliba AC	Second Round	(Cameroon) Union Douala	3–0	0–1	
1982	Djoliba AC	Quarterfinals	AS Vita Club	1–0	0–0	
1982	Djoliba AC	Semifinals	(Zambia) Power Dynamos FC	0–0	2–1	
1983	Stade Malien	First Round	(Algeria) JHD Alger	2–1	2–0	
1984	Djoliba AC	First Round	(Ghana) Great Olympics	0–4	0–0	
1984	AS Real Bamako	First Round	Dragons FC de l'Ouémé	2–2	2–0	
1985	Djoliba AC	First Round	(Algeria) MP Oran	0–0	2–0	
1987	AS Real Bamako	First Round	(Nigeria) Leventis United	0–0	4–0	
1987	Stade Malien	First Round	(Morocco) FAR Rabat	0–1	5–0	
1988	AS Sigui	Preliminary Round	(Sierra Leone) Real Republicans	0–0	0–0 (3–4 p)	
1989	Stade Malien	First Round	(Tunisia) CO Transports	3–0	0–0	
1989	Stade Malien	Second Round	(Algeria) USL Alger	1–0	1–0 (3–4 p)	
1990	Real Bamako	First Round	(Ghana) Hearts of Oak	1–2	2–0	
1991	Stade Malien	First Round	(Ivory Coast) SC Gagnoa	1–0	1–0 (4–5 p)	
1992	Real Bamako	Preliminary Round	(Mauritania) ASC Police	1–1	1–1 (5–4 p)	
1992	Real Bamako	First Round	(Morocco) WAC Casablanca	2–1	2–0	
1993	Stade Malien	First Round	(Guinea) Hafia AC	1–0	2–0	
1994	Djoliba AC	First Round	(Algeria) NA Hussein Dey	0–0	2–0	
1995	AS Nianan	Preliminary Round	(Togo) Étoile FIlante de Lomé	0–1	2–0	
1995	AS Nianan	First Round	(Nigeria) Julius Berger FC	1–3	5–0	
1997	Real Bamako	First Round	(Morocco) FAR Rabat	1–0	4–1	
1998	Stade Malien	First Round	(Tunisia) Espérance Tunis	1–2	0–1	
1999	Stade Malien	First Round	(Ivory Coast) Africa Sports	1–1	0–2	
2000	Stade Malien	First Round	(Democratic Republic of the Congo) AmS Dragons	3–0	3–2	
2000	Stade Malien	Second Round	(Niger) JS du Ténéré	1–1	1–0	
2001	CO Bamako	First Round	(Angola) Interclube	0–3	8–0	
2002	Mamahira AC	First Round	(Ivory Coast) Alliance Bouaké	0–4	2–0	
2003	CO Bamako	First Round	(Senegal) AS Douanes	2–0	0–1	
2003	CO Bamako	Second Round	(Tunisia) Étoile du Sahel	2–0	4–0	
2005	AS Nianan	First Round	(Morocco) OC Khouribga	1–1	1–0	
2006	AS Bamako	Preliminary Round	(Togo) Dynamic Togolais	5–0	0–0	
2006	AS Bamako	First Round	(Ghana) King Faisal Babes	1–0	0–0	
2006	AS Bamako	Second Round	al-Merrikh SC	3–0	3–0 (2–3 pen.)	
2006	USFAS	Preliminary Round	(Togo) Dynamic Togolais	5–0	0–0	
2006	USFAS	First Round	(Ghana) King Faisal Babes	1–0	0–0	
2006	USFAS	Second Round	al-Merreikh (Sudan)	3–0	3–0 (2–3 p)	
2007	USFAS	First Round	(Sierra Leone) Ports Authority	0–1	2–9	
2008	Djoliba AC	First Round	(Guinea) Satellite FC	2–0	0–1	
2008	Djoliba AC	Second Round	(Gabon) AS Mangasport	3–1	1–2	
2008	Djoliba AC	Quarterfinals	(Tunisia) Club Africain	0–0	0–0 (3–5 p)	
2009	Stade Malien	First Round	(Tunisia) Stade Tunisien	2–0	0–0	
2009	Stade Malien	First Round of 16	(Algeria) JSM Béjaïa	1–0	1–0 (12–13 p)	
2009	Stade Malien	Second Round of 16	(Morocco) Ittihad Khemisset	3–1	1–1	
2009	Stade Malien	Group Stage: 1st place	(Nigeria) Bayelsa United	0–1	1–2	
2009	Stade Malien	Group Stage: 1st place	(Egypt) Haras el-Hodood	2–0	1–1	
2009	Stade Malien	Group Stage: 1st place	(Angola) Primeiro de Agosto	0–0	0–0	
2009	Stade Malien	Semifinals	(Egypt) ENPPI	4–2	2–2	
2009	Stade Malien	Finals	(Algeria) ES Sétif	2–0	2–0 (2–3 p)	
2010	CO Bamako	Preliminary Round	(Sierra Leone) Central Parade	4–0	0–0	
2010	CO Bamako	First Round	(Angola) 1º de Agosto	0–0	0–3	
2010	Djoliba AC	First Round	(Algeria) CR Belouizdad	0–0	1–1 (a)	
2010	Djoliba AC	Group Stage: 3rd place	al-Hillal (Sudan)	2–0	2–1	
2010	Djoliba AC	Group Stage: 3rd place	(Niger) ASFAN Niamey	1–0	0–0	
2010	Djoliba AC	Group Stage: 3rd place	al Ittihad Tripoli	0–1	2–0	
2010	Stade Malien	First Round	(Ivory Coast) Séwé Sport	2–0	2–0 (3–4 p)	
2010	Stade Malien	First Round of 16	(Morocco) FUS Rabat	0–0	2–0	
2011	Centre Salif Keita	Preliminary Round	(Morocco) Difaa el Jadida	2–2	1–1 (a)	
2011	Real Bamako	First Round	(Mauritania) ASC Tevragh-Zeïna	0–1	0–0	
2012	CO Bamako	First Round	(Chad) Renaissance N'Djamena	3–1	3–2	
2012	CO Bamako	Second Round	(Egypt) ENPPI Club	3–0	3–1	
2012	CO Bamako	First Playoff	al-Hillal (Khartoumian Sudan)	0–2	1–0	
2012	Djoliba AC	Third Round	(Tunisia) Club Africain	2–0	2–0 (4–3 p)	
2012	Djoliba AC	Group Stage: 1st Place	(Republic of the Congo) AC Léopards	1–1	3–0	
2012	Djoliba AC	Group Stage: 1st Place	(Mali) Stade Malien	2–1	2–0	
2012	Djoliba AC	Group Stage: 1st Place	(Morocco) WAC Casablanca	2–1	1–2	
2012	Djoliba AC	Semifinals	al-Hillal (Khartoumian Sudan)	2–0	2–0 (7–6 p)	
2012	Djoliba AC	Finals	(Republic of the Congo) AC Léopards	2–2	2–1	
2012	Real Bamako	First Round	(The Gambia) GAMTEL FC	3–1	1–0	
2012	Real Bamako	Second Round	(Morocco) WAC Casablanca	1–0	3–0	
2012	Stade Malien	First Round	(Morocco) COD Meknès	3–0	1–1	
2012	Stade Malien	Group Stage: 3rd thplace	(Mali) Djoliba AC	0–2	2–1	
2012	Stade Malien	Group Stage: 3rd thplace	(Republic of the Congo) AC Léopards	1–1	1–0	
2012	Stade Malien	Group Stage: 3rd thplace	(Morocco) Wydad Casablanca	3–3	1–1	
2013	US Bougouni	Preliminary Round	(Cameroon) Unisport de Bafang	2–0	0–1	
2013	US Bougouni	First Round	(Angola) C.R. Caála	0–2	4–0	
2013	Onze Createurs	Preliminary Round	(Ivory Coast) Stella Club d'Adjamé	3–0	1–1	
2013	Onze Createurs	First Round	(Tunisia) Étoile du Sahel	2–3	2–1	
2013	Stade Malien	Preliminary Round	(Burundi) LLB Académic	5–0	0–1	
2013	Stade Malien	Group Stage: 2nd place	(Tunisia) CS Sfaxien	1–2	0–0	
2013	Stade Malien	Group Stage: 2nd place	(Tunisia) Étoile du Sahel	0–0	0–1	
2013	Stade Malien	Group Stage: 2nd place	(Ethiopia) Saint George SC	1–0	2–0	
2013	Stade Malien	Semifinals	(Democratic Republic of the Congo) TP Mazembe	1–2	1–0	
2014	CO Bamako	First Round	(Libya) al-Ahly Tripoli	1–0	1–1	
2014	CO Bamako	Second Round	(Ivory Coast) ASEC Mimosas	0–2	1–1	
2015	Djoliba AC	First Round	(Egypt) Petrojet	2–2	2–1	
2015	Djoliba AC	Second Round	(Ghana) Hearts of Oak	1–2	0–1	
2015	Onze Createurs	Preliminary Round	(Morocco) RS Berkane	1–0	2–1 (a)	
2015	Onze Createurs	Preliminary Round	(Niger) Sahel SC	2–1	0–0	
2015	Onze Createurs	SecondRound	(Ivory Coast) ASEC Mimosas	0–1	2–0	
2016	AS Bakaridjan	Preliminary Round	(Tunisia) Stade Gabésien	1–1	1–1 (3–4 p)	
2016	Stade Malien	First Round	(Morocco) FUS Rabat	0–0	4–0	
2016	USFAS	Preliminary Round	(Ivory Coast) SC Gagnoa	0–0	2–0	
2017	Djoliba AC	Preliminary Round	(Egypt) al-Masry	0–2	3–0^{4}	
2017	Onze Createurs	First Round	(Rwanda) Rayon Sport	1–0	3–0^{4}	
2018	Djoliba AC	Preliminary Round	(Liberia) ELWA United	—	—	w/o
2018	Djoliba AC	First Round	(Rwanda) APR	1–0	1–2	2–2 (a)
2018	Djoliba AC	Play-off Round	(Nigeria) MFM	0–0	1–0	1–0
2018	Djoliba AC	Group stage: 4th place	(Nigeria) Enyimba	0–1	0–2	
2018	Djoliba AC	Group stage: 4th place	(Republic of the Congo) CARA Brazzaville	2–0	0–1	
2018	Djoliba AC	Group stage: 4th place	(Ivory Coast) Williamsville AC	1–1	0–0	
2018	Onze Createurs	Preliminary Round	(Algeria) CR Belouizdad	1–1	0–2	1–3
2018–19	Djoliba AC	Preliminary Round	(Senegal) Génération Foot	0–1	0–0	0–1
2018–19	Stade Malien	Play-off Round	(Angola) Petro de Luanda	1–1	1–2	2–3
2019–20	Djoliba AC	First Round	(Togo) Maranatha FC	1–1	2–1	3–2
2019–20	Djoliba AC	Play-off Round	(Chad) Elect-Sport	4–0	1–0	5–0
2019–20	Djoliba AC	Group stage: 3rd place	(Guinea) Horoya	0–0	0–1	
2019–20	Djoliba AC	Group stage: 3rd place	(Libya) Al Nasr	0–1	1–1	
2019–20	Djoliba AC	Group stage: 3rd place	(South Africa) Bidvest Wits	1–0	2–0	
2020–21	Yeelen Olympique	Preliminary Round	(Niger) USGN	0–1	1–1	1–2
2020–21	Stade Malien	Play-off Round	(Algeria) JS Kabylie	2–1	0–1	2–2 (a)
2021–22	Binga FC	First Round	(Liberia) MC Breweries	3–0	2–0	5–0
2021–22	Binga FC	Second Round	(Burkina Faso) ASFA Yennenga	0–1	1–0	1–1 (7–6 p)
2021–22	Binga FC	Play-off Round	(Zambia) Zanaco	2–0	0–3	2–3
2021–22	Stade Malien	Play-off Round	(Libya) Al Ahli Tripoli	1–0	0–1	1–1 (2–4 p)
2022–23	Real Bamako	First Round	(Burkina Faso) Douanes de Ouagadougou	0–0	0–0	0–0 (3–1 p)
2022–23	Real Bamako	Second Round	(Ghana) Hearts of Oak	3–0	0–1	3–1
2022–23	Real Bamako	Play-off Round	(Eswatini) Royal Leopards	3–1	1–1	4–2
2022–23	Real Bamako	Group stage: 3rd place	(Tanzania) Young Africans	1–1	0–2	
2022–23	Real Bamako	Group stage: 3rd place	(Tunisia) Union Monastirienne	1–1	1–2	
2022–23	Real Bamako	Group stage: 3rd place	(Democratic Republic of the Congo) TP Mazembe	2–1	1–3	
2022–23	Djoliba AC	Play-off Round	(Morocco) ASFAR	0–0	0–4	0–4
2023–24	Stade Malien	First Round	(Liberia) Watanga	4–1	3–1	7–2
2023–24	Stade Malien	Second Round	(Burundi) Aigle Noir	2–0	3–1	3–3 (a)
2023–24	Stade Malien	Group stage: 2nd place	(Morocco) RS Berkane	1–2	0–3	
2023–24	Stade Malien	Group stage: 2nd place	(South Africa) Sekhukhune United	1–0	0–0	
2023–24	Stade Malien	Group stage: 2nd place	(Republic of the Congo) Diables Noirs	1–0	3–1	
2023–24	Stade Malien	Quarter-finals	(Ghana) Dreams	1–2	1–1	2–3
2024–25	Stade Malien	Second Round	(Liberia) Paynesville	3–1	0–1	3–2
2024–25	Stade Malien	Group stage: 4th place	(Morocco) RS Berkane	0–1	0–1	
2024–25	Stade Malien	Group stage: 4th place	(South Africa) Stellenbosch	2–0	0–2	
2024–25	Stade Malien	Group stage: 4th place	(Angola) Desportivo da LS	0–1	1–1	
2025–26	Djoliba AC	First Round	(Nigeria) Abia Warriors	1–0	1–1	2–1
2025–26	Djoliba AC	Second Round	(Burkina Faso) USFA	2–1	0–0	2–1
2025–26	Djoliba AC	Group stage: 3rd place	(Algeria) USM Alger	0–0	0–2	
2025–26	Djoliba AC	Group stage: 3rd place	(Morocco) Olympic Safi	0–1	1–2	
2025–26	Djoliba AC	Group stage: 3rd place	(Ivory Coast) San Pédro	4–0	0–2	
2026–27	Real Bamako	First Round	(Burkina Faso) Vitesse	0–0	2–1	2–1
2026–27	Real Bamako	Second Round	(Tunisia) ES Zarzis	16–18 Oct	23–25 Oct	–
2026–27	Diarra	First Round	(Ghana) Nations	1–0	1–1	2–1
2026–27	Diarra	Second Round	(Togo) ASKO Kara	16–18 Oct	23–25 Oct	–

== CAF Cup ==
Season	Club	Round	Opponent	Home	Away
1992	Djoliba AC	First Round	(Burkina Faso) USC Bobo-Dioulasso	2–1	1–0 (a)
1993	AS Sigui	Preliminary Round	(Nigeria) Shooting Stars	1–0	2–1
1993	AS Sigui	First Round	(Ivory Coast) Stade d'Abidjan	0–2	3–0
1994	AS Nianan	Preliminary Round	Delta (Gabon)	1–1	0–2
1994	AS Nianan	First Round	(Tunisia) JS Kairouan	3–1	3–1 (5–6 p)
1997	Stade Malien	First Round	(Algeria) USM Aïn Beïda	0–1	1–1
1998	USFAS Bamako	First Round	(Morocco) RS Settat	2–2	0–0
1999	Centre Salif Keita	First Round	(Tunisia) ES Sahel	0–2	3–0
2000	USFAS Bamako	First Round	(Ghana) Cape Coast	2–0	3–0
2002	Djoliba AC	Second Round	(Nigeria) NPA FC	3–0	2–1
2002	Djoliba AC	Second Round	(Togo) Maranatha FC	1–0	2–1 (a)
2002	Djoliba AC	Quarterfinals	(Algeria) JS Kabylie	0–0	2–1
2003	Djoliba AC	First Round	(Gabon) FC 105 Libreville	3–1	3–0

== CAF Super Cup ==
Season	Club	Opponent	Result
2010	Stade Malien	(Democratic Republic of the Congo) TP Mazembe	0–2

== Notes ==
^{1} The match was finished 2-0 in favour of Djoliba, ASFA refused to play the penalty shootout due to arbitration, they were to be banned from CAF competitions for three years, no ban was put as ASFA Dakar participated the following season after winning their second championship title
^{2}Djoliba was disqualified for not paying their debts to the CAF
^{3} Stade Malien succeeded as the Invincible Eleven fielded an ineligible player
^{4} On March 10, the Malian Football Federation (FEMAFOOT) was dissolved and effectively kicked out Malian clubs including Djoliba and Onze Créateurs out of competition and automatically Egypt's al-Masry awarded the away match 3-0 against Djoliba along with Rwanda's Rayon Sport against Onze Créateurs. On March 17, FIFA suspended the Malian Football Federation (FEMAFOOT or FEMIFOOT) until early May
