= Football in Togo =

- Country: Togo
- Governing body: Togolese Football Federation
- National team: men's national team
- Clubs: Togolese Championnat National

International competitions
- Champions League; CAF Confederation Cup; Super Cup; FIFA Club World Cup; FIFA World Cup (National Team); African Cup of Nations (National Team)

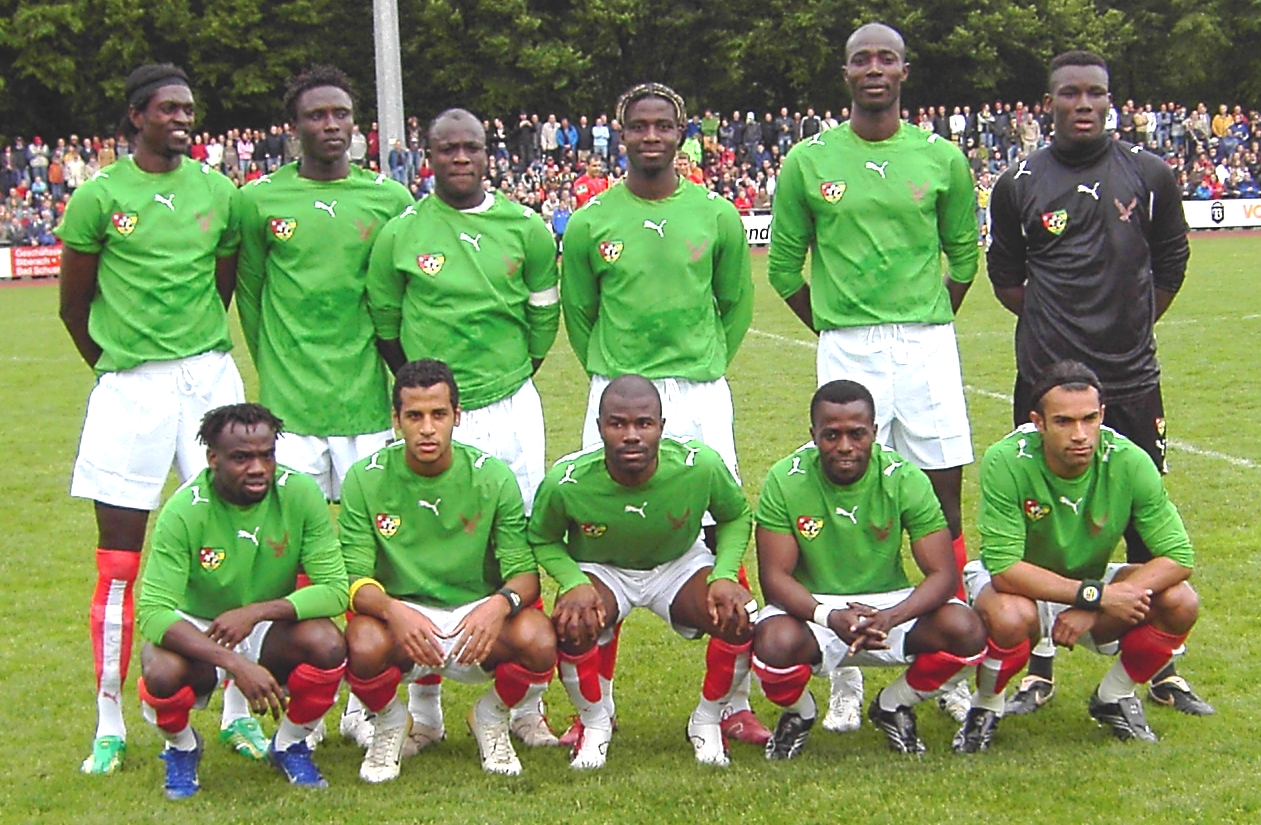
The Togo national football team.

The sport of football in the country of Togo is run by the Togolese Football Federation. The association administers the national football team, as well as the Premier League. Football is the most popular sport in Togo.

== Recent history ==
Togo qualified for the first time to a FIFA World Cup in 2006, for the edition to be held in Germany; however, its participation was marred by incidents and headlines. There were problems within the Togolese Football Federation as well as between players and the Football Association, linked to were financial bonuses. The culmination of that conflict led to the resignation of the national team coach, Otto Pfister, and the threat made by the players not to play their game against Switzerland on 16 June 2006. Ultimately, the FIFA stepped in to satisfy the players' requirements and the first boycott of a FIFA World Cup game never happened. Togo was knocked out of the tournament in the group stage after losing to South Korea, Switzerland and France.

Over the following months, the stalemate continued to mar Togolese football, and eventually resulted in the dismissal of strike pair and Kader Coubadja-Touré, and defender Daré Nibombé in March 2007, ostensibly for "indecent remarks concerning the FTF management."

On 8 January 2010, The Togo National Football team's bus was fired upon in Angola whilst attending the African Nations Cup being held there. The bus driver, assistant coach and team spokesman died, and two players were also injured. This led to Togo withdrawing from the tournament at the behest of the Togolese government.

On 12 April 2010, Emmanuel Adebayor, the most famous Togolese player, retired from duty with the Togo National team.

On 26 November 2011, former Togo goalkeeper Charles Balogou was among six people killed when a bus, carrying players and officials from the Etoile Filante delegation, plunged into a ravine 130 kilometers north of Lomé and caught fire. Togo football federation spokesman Aime Ekpe said another 25 people from the delegation – 19 of them players – in addition to the driver were injured in the crash.

== Football stadiums in Togo ==
#	Stadium	Capacity	City	Tenants	Image
1	Stade de Kégué	25,000	Lomé	Togo national football team	
2	Stade omnisport de Lomé	20,000	Lomé		
3	Stade Général Eyadema	15,000	Lomé		
4	Stade Municipal	10,000	Kara	ASKO Kara	
5	Stade Municipal	10,000	Kpalimé	Gomido FC	
6	Stade Municipal	10,000	Sokodé	AC Semassi FC	

== Attendances ==
The average attendance per top-flight football league season and the club with the highest average attendance:

Season	League average	Best club	Best club average
2018-19	505	ASC Kozah	831

Source: League page on Wikipedia

== See also ==
- Lists of stadiums
