= List of association football club rivalries in Africa =

This list deals with association football rivalries around Africa among clubs. This includes local derbies as well as matches between teams further afield. For rivalries between international teams and club rivalries around the world, see List of association football rivalries.

Only clubs of federations which are members of CAF are included. The article is alphabetically split into CAF member zones: CECAFA (East), COSAFA (South), UNAF (North), UNIFFAC (Central) and WAFU-UFOA (West).

== Clubs in UNAF ==
=== Algeria ===
By city

- Algiers derbies
  - Algiers derby: MC Algiers vs. USM Algiers
  - Algiers derby 2: MC Algiers vs. CR Belouizdad
  - Algiers derby 3 USM Alger vs CR Belouizdad
  - Derbies in Algiers: USM El Harrach vs NA Hussein Dey vs RC Kouba
- Oran derbies
  - Oran derby: MC Oran vs. ASM Oran
  - Derbies in Oran: SCM Oran vs RCG Oran vs USM Oran
- Derby of Constantine: CS Constantine vs. MO Constantine
- Derby of Annaba: USM Annaba vs. Hamra Annaba
- Derby of Mostaganem: ES Mostaganem vs. WA Mostaganem
- Derby of Batna: CA Batna vs. MSP Batna
- Derby of Soummam: JSM Béjaïa vs. MO Béjaïa
- Derby of Setif: ES Setif vs. MC El Eulma
- Derby of Skikda: JSM Skikda vs. ES Collo
- Derby of Chaouia : US Chaouia vs AS Aïn M'lila
- Derby of Djijel : JS Djijel vs CR Village Moussa

By region

- Algerian super clasico: MC Oran vs. CR Belouizdad
- Algerian clasico: MC Algiers vs. JS Kabylie
- West derby: MC Oran vs USM Bel Abbès
- East derby: ES Sétif vs CS Constantine
- Plateaus derby: JS Kabylie vs. ES Sétif
- Kabylie derby: JS Kabylie vs. JSM Béjaïa or MO Béjaïa
- Derby of Mitidja: USM Blida vs. WA Boufarik or RC Arbaâ
- East sea derby: JSM Skikda vs USM Annaba
- West plains derby: GC Mascara, JSM Tiaret, MC Saïda, RC Relizane, USM Bel Abbes, WA Tlemcen
- Sahara derby: JS Saoura vs US Biskra or MB Rouissat

=== Egypt ===
- Cairo derby: Al Ahly vs. Zamalek SC
- Canal derby: Ismaily SC vs. Al-Masry SC
- Ahly–Ismaily rivalry: Al Ahly vs. Ismaily SC
- Al Ahly–Al Masry rivalry: Al Masry vs. Al Ahly
- Al Ahly–Pyramids rivalry: Al Ahly vs. Pyramids FC
- Zamalek–Pyramids rivalry: Zamalek SC vs. Pyramids FC
- Alexandria derby: El Ittihad Alexandria vs. Smouha SC
- El Mahalla derby: Ghazl El Mahalla vs. Baladeyet El Mahalla
- Mit Okba derby: Zamalek SC vs. Tersana SC
- Coastal derby: Ittihad Alexandria vs. Ismaily SC
- Mediterranean Classico: Ittihad Alexandria vs. Al Masry SC

=== Libya ===
- Libya derby: Al-Ittihad vs. Al-Ahly (Tripoli)
- Benghazi derby: Al-Ahly (Benghazi) vs. Al-Nasr
- Derna derby: Darnes vs. Al-Afriqi
- Classico: Al-Ahly (Tripoli) vs. Al-Ahly (Benghazi)
- Misrata Derby: Asswehly Sc vs. Al Ittihad Misurata SC
- Tripoli Derby: Al-Ahly (Tripoli) vs. Al Madina Sc
- Bayda Derby: Al Akhdar SC vs. Al Ansar Club (Libya)

=== Morocco ===
- Casablanca Derby: Raja CA vs. Wydad AC.
- Moroccan classico: Wydad AC vs. AS FAR
- Moroccan Clasico: Raja CA vs. AS FAR
- Rabat Derby: AS FAR vs. FUS Rabat
- Saïss Derby: CODM de Meknès vs. Maghreb de Fès
- Fez Derby: Wydad Fez vs. MAS Fez
- North Derby: Moghreb Tetouan vs. Ittihad de Tanger
- East Derby: MC Oujda vs. Renaissance Sportive de Berkane
- Amazigh Derby: Chabab Rif Al Hoceima vs. Hassania Agadir
- Derby de Doukkala: OC Safi vs. Difaâ El Jadidi
- South Derby: KAC Marrakesh vs. Hassania Agadir

=== Tunisia ===
- Tunis derby: Club Africain vs. ES Tunis
- El Classico: ES Tunis vs. ES Sahel
- Small Tunis derby: (ES Tunis vs. Stade Tunisien / Club Africain vs. Stade Tunisien)
- Gabès derby : Stade Gabèsien vs. AS Gabès.
- Derby du Sahel: ES Sahel vs. US Monastir
- Sfax derby: CS Sfaxien vs. Sfax Railways Sports
- South-East derby: ES Zarzis vs. US Ben Guerdane

== Clubs in WAFU ==
=== Burkina Faso ===
- Derby de la Capitale: Étoile Filante vs. ASFA Yennenga

=== Cape Verde ===
- Clássico da Capital: Boavista vs. Sporting Praia
- Clássico da Ilha do Aeroporto: Académica do Sal vs. Académico do Aeroporto
- Clássico Mindelense:
  - Mindelense–Académica rivalry: Académica do Mindelo vs. CS Mindelense
  - Mindelense–Batuque rivalry: Batuque FC vs. CS Mindelense
  - Mindelense–Derby rivalry: FC Derby vs. CS Mindelense
- Clássico de São Nicolau: FC Ultramarina vs. SC Atlético

=== Gambia ===
- Banjul derby: Real Banjul vs. Wallidan FC

=== Ghana ===
- Derby of Ghana: Asante Kotoko vs. Hearts of Oak
- Kumasi derby: Asante Kotoko vs. King Faisal Babes
- Capital city derby: Hearts of Oak vs. Accra Great Olympics
- Ashanti Region derby: Asante Kotoko vs. Ashanti Gold

=== Guinea-Bissau ===
- Derby Eterno de Bissau: Sport Bissau e Benfica vs. Sporting de Bissau

=== Ivory Coast ===
- Ivorian derby: ASEC Mimosas vs. Africa Sports
- Abidjan derby 1: ASEC Mimosas vs. Stade d'Abidjan
- Abidjan derby 2: Africa Sports vs. Stade d'Abidjan

=== Mali ===
- Grand derby: Djoliba AC vs. Stade Malien
- Bamako derby: Djoliba AC vs. AS Real Bamako

=== Mauritania ===
- Nouakchott derby: AS Garde Nationale vs ASC Police or ACS Ksar
- Nouadhibou derby: FC Nouadhibou vs ASC Snim

=== Nigeria ===
- Zobia Super Classic:Enyimba vs Kano Pillars
- Lagos Derby :Sporting Lagos F.C. vs Inter Lagos F.C. or any Lagos club
- Jos derby: Any two of Plateau United, Mighty Jets of Jos, and Giwa FC
- Oriental derby: Any two of Enyimba, Enugu Rangers, Heartland F.C. and Ifeanyi Ubah
- Northwest Derby: Katsina United vs Kano Pillars
- Savannah Derby: Gombe United vs Doma United
- Southwest Derby: Shooting Stars vs Remo Stars
- Niger Delta Derby: Rivers United F.C. vs Bayelsa United F.C.

=== Sierra Leone ===
- Freetown derby: East End Lions vs. Mighty Blackpool

=== Togo ===
- Derby de Sokodé: Semassi vs. Tchaoudjo AC
- Lomé Derbies:
  - Derby de Lomé: AS Douanes vs. OC Agaza
  - Any combinations of these four big teams from the capital city Lomé AS Douanes, AS Togo-Port, Étoile Filante, OC Agaza

== Clubs in UNIFFAC ==
=== Cameroon ===
- Yaoundé derby: Canon Yaoundé vs. Tonnerre Yaoundé
- Douala derby: Union Douala vs. Oryx Douala

=== Democratic Republic of the Congo ===
- Kinshasa derby: AS Vita Club vs. DC Motema Pembe
- Lubumbashi Derby TP Mazembe vs. FC Saint-Éloi Lupopo

=== Equatorial Guinea ===
- Clasico Ecuatoguineano: Leones Vegetarianos FC vs. Atletico Semu

=== Republic of the Congo ===
- Brazzaville derby: Étoile du Congo vs. Diables Noirs

== Clubs in CECAFA ==
=== Ethiopia ===
- Sheger derby: Ethiopian Coffee vs. Saint George

=== Kenya ===
- Mashemeji Derby: A.F.C. Leopards vs. Gor Mahia
- Naivasha derby: Karuturi Sports vs. Oserian F.C.

=== Rwanda ===
- Rubavu derby: Etincelles F.C. vs. Marines F.C.
- Rwandan derby: Rayon Sports F.C. vs. APR FC

=== Sudan ===
- Omdurman derby: Al-Hilal Club vs. Al-Merreikh SC
- Port Sudan derby: Hilal Alsahil vs. Hay Al-Arab SC

=== Tanzania ===
- Kariakoo derby: Yanga vs. Simba

Dar es laam derby Azam fc vs Young Africans

Dar es laam classico Azam fc vs Simba sc

Sugar derby Kagera sugar vs mtibwa sugar

Mbeya derby Kengold vs Mbeya city

Army derby Jkt Tanzania vs Tanzania prisons JKT Tanzania vs Tanzania police fc Tanzania police fc vs Tanzania prisons

Tanga coastal derby African sports vs Coastal union fc

=== Uganda ===
- Kampala derby: Villa vs. Express
- Arua derby: Onduparaka vs. Arua Hill
- Mbale derby: Mbale Heroes vs. Kataka
- Jinja derby: BUL vs. Busoga United
- Bunyoro derby: Kitara vs. Booma

== Clubs in COSAFA ==
=== Angola ===
- Dérbi do Povo: Petro Atlético vs. Primeiro de Agosto
- Dérbi de Luanda: Interclube vs. Petro de Luanda
- Dérbi das Lundas: Progresso da Lunda Sul vs. Sagrada Esperança

=== Botswana ===
- Gaborone Derby: Gaborone United vs. Township Rollers vs. Notwane FC
- Francistown Derby: ECCO City Greens vs. TAFIC
- Lobatse Derby: BMC vs. Extension Gunners
- Selebi-Phikwe Derby: Nico United vs. Satmos

=== Eswatini ===
- Mbabane derby: Mbabane Highlanders vs. Mbabane Swallows
- Forces derby: Royal Leopards vs. Green Mamba
- Manzini derby: Manzini Wanderers vs. Moneni Pirates

=== Lesotho ===
- Basotho Classic: Bantu F.C. vs. Matlama F.C.

=== Namibia ===
- Fighters-Stars rivalry: African Stars vs. Life Fighters
- Katutura derby: Black Africa vs. Orlando Pirates Windhoek
- Walvis Bay derby: Blue Waters vs. Eleven Arrows F.C.

=== South Africa ===
- The South African Classic: Orlando Pirates F.C. vs. Mamelodi Sundowns F.C.
- The Soweto derby: Kaizer Chiefs vs. Orlando Pirates.
- Cape Town Derby: Cape Town Spurs vs. Cape Town City
- Limpopo Derby: Baroka F.C. vs. Black Leopards
  Polokwane City F.C. vs. Magesi F.C.
- Tshwane Derby: Mamelodi Sundowns vs. SuperSport United
- Durban Derby: AmaZulu vs. Golden Arrows as Amazulu FC and Golden Arrow (abafana besthende) are from the same province, this sparked a derby since the 1970s/1980s between the two teams, sometimes the derby is called the Zulu or Natal derby.
- The Golden Derby : Kaizer Chiefs vs Mamelodi Sundowns
- Northern Cape Derby: Upington City F.C. vs. Hungry Lions F.C.

=== Zambia ===
- Kitwe derby: Power Dynamos vs. Nkana F.C.
- Ndola derby: Zesco United vs. Forest Rangers
- Lusaka derby: Zanaco F.C. vs. Lusaka Dynamos vs. Red Arrows F.C.
- Copperbelt derby: Power Dynamos or Nkana F.C. vs. Zesco United
- Military derby: Green Eagles vs Green Baffaloes vs Red Arrows

=== Zimbabwe ===
- Harare Derby: CAPS United vs. Dynamos FC
- Bulawayo Derby: Highlanders vs. Zimbabwe Saints
- Battle of Zimbabwe: Highlanders vs. Dynamos FC
- Battle of the Cities: CAPS United vs. Highlanders
- Midlands Derby: Lancashire Steel vs. Shabanie Mine
