= Luc Agbala =

Togolese footballer and referee (1947-2010)

Personal information
- Full name: Luc Agbala Watékou
- Date of birth: 23 September 1947
- Place of birth: Kandé, Togo
- Date of death: 18 October 2010 (aged 63)
- Place of death: Paris, France
- Position: Forward

Senior career*
Years	Team	Apps	(Gls)
1966–1972	Diables Rouges de Lomé		
1972–1977	Lomé I		

International career
?–?	Togo	11	(?)
- * Club domestic league appearances and goals

Luc Agbala Watékou (23 September 1947 – 18 October 2010) was a Togo international football forward and referee.

== Playing career ==
Born in Kandé, Agbala began playing club football for local side Diables Rouges de Lomé, now Dynamic Togolais. He made his first-division debut in 1966, scoring a goal in the match. He would lead the Togo league in scoring twice and won the championship with Dynamic Togolais in 1970 and 1971.

In 1972, Agbala moved to France to study physiotherapy. He returned to Togo and played for Lomé I, a fusion of Dynamic Togolais, Etoile Filante de Lomé and Modèle Lomé. He helped the club reach the semi-finals of the 1977 African Cup of Champions Clubs.

Agbala made eleven appearances for the senior Togo national football team and participated in the 1972 African Cup of Nations finals, Togo's first.

== Officiating career ==
After he retired from playing football, Agbala took officiating courses and became an international referee. He officiated matches until 1992, including a 1986 World Cup qualifier between Sierra Leone and Morocco. He also was the executive director of the Stade Omnisports de Lomé.

== Personal ==
Agbala died in Paris at age 63 on 18 October 2010 following a long illness.
