= Tadjou Salou =

Togolese footballer

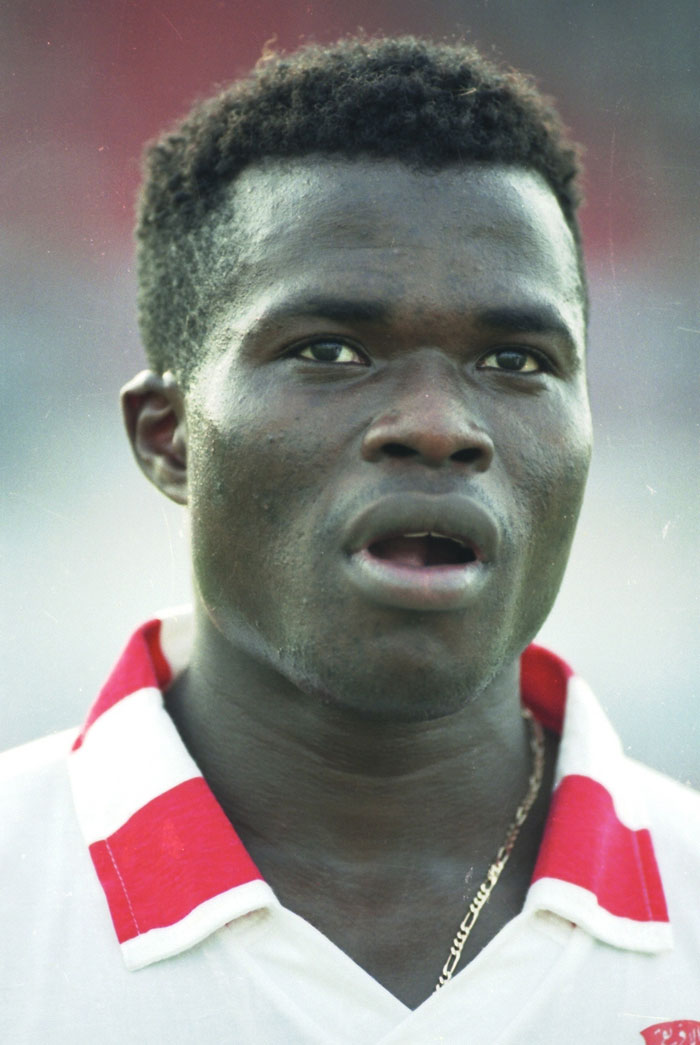

Personal information
- Date of birth: 24 December 1974
- Place of birth: Lomé, Togo
- Date of death: 2 April 2007 (aged 32)
- Position: Defender

Senior career*
Years	Team	Apps	(Gls)
1992	Modèle de Lomé		
1993–1994	OC Agaza		
1994–1996	Club Africain		
1996–1999	Servette	30	(1)
1999–2003	Étoile Carouge		
2003–2004	OC Agaza		
2004–2005	AS Douanes		
2005–2006	Étoile Filante		
2006–2007	AS Douanes		

International career
1992–2004	Togo	62	(12)
- * Club domestic league appearances and goals

Tadjou Salou (24 December 1974 – 2 April 2007) was a Togolese footballer who played as a defender.

== Career ==
Born in Lomé, Salou played club football for Modèle de Lomé, OC Agaza, Club Africain, Servette, Étoile Carouge, AS Douanes and Étoile Filante.

He was a member of the Togo national team between 1992 and 2007, serving as captain. He was a squad member at the 2000 African Cup of Nations.

== Later life and death ==
Salou died following a "long illness" in April 2007.

== Career statistics ==
=== International ===
Scores and results list Togo's goal tally first, score column indicates score after each Salou goal.

List of international goals scored by Tadjou Salou
No.	Date	Venue	Opponent	Score	Result	Competition
1	25 October 1992	Stade de Kégué, Lomé, Togo	Egypt	1–2	1–4	1994 FIFA World Cup qualification
2	5 October 1996	Stade Municipal, Lomé, Togo	Tanzania	1–0	2–1	1998 Africa Cup of Nations qualification
3	10 November 1996	Stade de Kégué, Lomé, Togo	Cameroon	2–4	2–4	1998 FIFA World Cup qualification
4	6 January 1997	Stade Municipal, Lomé, Togo	Ghana	2–0	4–0	Friendly
5	6 January 1997	Stade Municipal, Lomé, Togo	Ghana	3–0	4–0	Friendly
6	13 July 1997	Stade Municipal, Lomé, Togo	Liberia	1–0	4–0	1998 Africa Cup of Nations qualification
7	24 December 1997	Cairo International Stadium, Cairo, Egypt	Cameroon	1–0	1–3	Friendly
8	4 October 1998	Stade Municipal, Lomé, Togo	Guinea	1–0	2–0	2000 African Cup of Nations qualification
9	19 January 2000	Stade de Kégué, Lomé, Togo	Egypt	1–0	1–0	Friendly
10	3 September 2000	Stade de Kégué, Lomé, Togo	Sierra Leone	2–0	2–0 (4–2 p)	2002 Africa Cup of Nations qualification
11	8 October 2000	Stade de Kégué, Lomé, Togo	Uganda	1–0	3–0	2002 Africa Cup of Nations qualification
12	23 May 2004	Stade de Kégué, Lomé, Togo	Benin	1–1	1–1	Friendly
