= Koffi Gueli =

Togolese professional footballer

Personal information
- Full name: Koffi Mawukoenya Gueli
- Date of birth: 31 December 1993 (age 32)
- Place of birth: Notsé, Togo
- Height: 1.80 m (5 ft 11 in)
- Position: Striker

Team information
- Current team: Gbohloé-su

Senior career*
Years	Team	Apps	(Gls)
- AS Police Lomé
2012	AS Togo-Port		
2013	Dynamic Togolais		
2013-2014	AS Stade Mandji		
2014	Rayon Sports FC		
2014	ASFA Yennenga		
2015	Deportivo Mongomo	26	(15)
2016-2017	AS Denguélé		
2018–	Gbohloé-su	16	(7)

International career
2012-2013	Togo under-20		
2019–	Togo	1	(0)
- * Club domestic league appearances and goals

Koffi Gueli (born 31 December 1993) is a Togolese professional footballer who plays as a striker for Gbohloé-su of the Togolese Championnat National and the Togo national team.

== Club career ==
After having started his career at AS Police in Lomé, Gueli moved on to play for two other first division clubs in Togo, namely AS Togo-Port and Dynamic Togolais. In 2014, he made a move to ASFA Yennenga in Burkina Faso before moving to Deportivo Mongomo in Equatorial Guinea. At Mongomo, he scored 15 goals in all competitions and won the Equatoguinean Cup with them in their 2015 season.

In October 2016, he joined AS Denguélé in Ligue 1 in Ivory Coast. He then made a return to Togo in 2019, signing for Gbohloé-su for the second half of the season, scoring 7 goals in the Togolese Championnat.

== International career ==
He has represented Togo national youth teams, notably the Togo U20 team.

He was called up to the preliminary Togo national team squad for the 2017 African Cup of Nations by Claude Le Roy but did not make the final 23 man squad for the competition.

In July 2019, he played for Togo in their 2020 African Nations Championship qualifier against Benin.

== Honours ==
Deportivo Mongomo

- Equatoguinean Cup: 2015

== Career statistics ==
=== Club ===
Appearances and goals by club, season and competition
Club	Season	League			Total	
Club	Season	Division	Apps	Goals	Apps	Goals
Deportivo Mongomo	2014–15	Equatoguinean Primera División	26	15	26	15
Deportivo Mongomo	Total		26	15	26	15
Gbohloé-su	2018-19	Togolese Championnat National	16	7	16	7
Gbohloé-su	Total		16	7	16	7
Career total			42	22	42	22

=== International ===
As of 15 October 2019

National team	Year	Apps	Goals
Togo	2019	1	0
Total		1	0
