= Coupe du Togo =

Football tournament in Togo

- Founded: 1955
- Current champions: ASCK (1st title)
- Most championships: ASC Kara (4 titles)
- Website: https://www.ftftogo.com/
- 2025 Coupe du Togo

The Coupe du Togo is the top knockout tournament of the Togolese football.

== Winners ==
=== before independence ===
- 1955 : Essor (Lomé)
- 1956 : Etoile Filante de Lomé
- 1958 : Etoile Filante de Lomé

=== since independence ===
Year	Winner	Scoreline	Runner-up	Reference
1961	Etoile Filante de Lomé			
1962 to 1973	Unknown winners			
1974	Omnisports (Atakpamé)			
1975	ASKO Kara (Kara)			
1976	ASKO Kara (Kara)			
1977	Edan (Lomé)			
1978	No Competition			
1979	OC Agaza (Lomé)			
1980	AC Semassi F.C. (Sokodé)			
1981	OC Agaza (Lomé)	1–0	Aiglons (Lomé)	
1982	AC Semassi F.C. (Sokodé)	1–0	OC Agaza (Lomé)	
1983	No Competition			
1984	OC Agaza (Lomé)	0–0 (3–0 p)	ASFOSA (Lomé)	
1985	Foadan FC (Dapaong)	1–0	Doumbé FC (Sansanné-Mango)	
1986	Entente 2 (Lomé)	2–0	ASKO Kara (Kara)	
1987	ASKO Kara (Kara)	2–1	AC Semassi FC (Sokodé)	
1988	OC Agaza (Lomé)	1–0	Ifodje Atakpamé (Atakpamé)	
1989	Entente 2 (Lomé)	1–0	Aiglons (Lomé)	
1990	AC Semassi F.C. (Sokodé)	2–1	Entente 2 (Lomé)	
1991 to 1993	No Competition			
1994	Etoile Filante de Lomé	3–2	OC Agaza (Lomé)	
1995	ASKO Kara (Kara)	1–0	AC Semassi FC (Sokodé)	
1996	Doumbé F.C. (Sansanné-Mango)	2–1	Etoile Filante de Lomé	
1997 to 1998	No Competition			
1999	OC Agaza (Lomé)	1–0	Entente 2 (Lomé)	
2000	Unknown winner			
2001	Dynamic Togolais (Lomé)	3–0	Sara (Bafilo)	
2002	Dynamic Togolais (Lomé)	2–0	Doumbé FC (Sansanné-Mango)	
2003	Maranatha F.C. (Fiokpo)			
2004	AS Douane (Lomé)	2–1	Foadan FC (Dapaong)	
2005	Dynamic Togolais (Lomé)	1–0	OC Agaza (Lomé)	
2006	AS Togo-Port (Lomé)	1–1 (5–4 p)	ASKO Kara	
2007 to 2017	No Competition			
Coupe Nationale
2018	Gomido FC (Kpalimé)	3–0	Dynamic Togolais (Lomé)	
2019 to 2023	No Competition			
2023–24	ASCK (Kara)	2–1	ASKO Kara (Kara)	
