= Daré Nibombé =

Togolese footballer (1980)

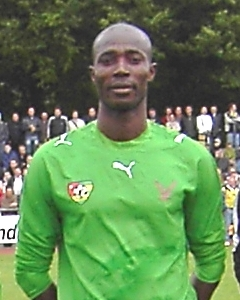
- Nibombé in 2006

Personal information
- Full name: Daré Nibombé
- Date of birth: 16 June 1980 (age 46)
- Place of birth: Lomé, Togo
- Height: 1.96 m (6 ft 5 in)
- Position: Centre-back

Senior career*
Years	Team	Apps	(Gls)
1997–1999	Modèle Lomé		
1999–2001	ASKO Kara		
2001–2002	Liberty Professionals F.C.		
2002	AS Douanes	30	(3)
2002–2003	La Louvière	27	(4)
2003–2008	Mons	97	(3)
2008–2009	CS Otopeni	6	(1)
2008–2010	Politehnica Timişoara	36	(1)
2010	FC Baku	11	(1)
2011	Arminia Bielefeld	3	(0)
2011–2012	Al-Nassr		
2012–2014	RBD Borinage	50	(1)
2014–2015	Francs Borains	4	(1)

International career
2000–2013	Togo	57	(0)

Managerial career
- 2015–2016: SC Paturages (youth)
- 2016–2017: Francs Borains (U21)
- 2017–2019: Tubize (U21)
- 2019–2023: Charleroni (youth)
- 2024–2025: Togo
Medal record
Politehnica Timişoara
Runner-up	Liga I	2009
Runner-up	Romanian Cup	2009
- * Club domestic league appearances and goals

Daré Nibombé (born 16 June 1980) is a Togolese football manager and former player. He served as head coach of the Togo national team from July 2024 to December 2025. As a player, he operated primarily as a centre-back.

== Club career ==
Born in Lomé, Nibombé began his football career in Togo. In 1999, he moved to ASKO Kara, before joining Ghanaian club Liberty Professionals F.C. in 2001. He returned to Togo in 2002, joining AS Douanes, before moving to Belgium later that year to join RAA La Louvière, marking his first move to European football.

In 2003, Nibombé moved to RAEC Mons in Belgium, where he spent five seasons through the 2007–08 season. He made league appearances for Mons from the 2003–04 season through the 2007–08 season.

In 2008, Nibombé joined CS Otopeni. During the 2008–09 season, he made six league appearances for Otopeni and scored one goal.

In January 2009, Nibombé moved to Politehnica Timișoara. He played for the club in the UEFA Champions League third qualifying round against Shakhtar Donetsk in 2009. Politehnica Timișoara advanced to the next round after the two legs ended in a 2–2 aggregate draw, progressing on away goals.

In the following Champions League play-off round, Politehnica Timișoara faced Stuttgart. Politehnica Timișoara lost the first leg 2–0 and drew the second leg 0–0, losing 2–0 on aggregate and being eliminated.

During the 2009–10 season, Nibombé established himself as a regular centre-back in Liga I, making 26 league appearances for Timișoara during the season. On 15 June 2010, he left Timișoara and moved to Azerbaijan to join FK Baku. Nibombé played for FK Baku from 2010 to 2011.

In 2011, he moved to 2. Bundesliga club Arminia Bielefeld, making three league appearances during the 2010–11 season.

== International career ==
Nibombé was a regular defender for the Togo national football team. He participated in the 2006 Africa Cup of Nations and was also a member of Togo's squad at the 2006 FIFA World Cup in Germany. Togo were drawn into Group G alongside South Korea, Switzerland, and France.

Nibombé started all three of Togo's group-stage matches at the 2006 FIFA World Cup. On 13 June, he played the full 90 minutes against South Korea, as Togo lost 2–1. He then played the full match against Switzerland on 19 June and against France on 23 June. Togo lost 2–0 to Switzerland and 2–0 to France, and were eliminated in the group stage.

Nibombé started all three of Togo's matches at the tournament, playing a total of 270 minutes, and served as a starting centre-back during Togo's first appearance at the FIFA World Cup finals.

== Managerial career ==
Nibombé became the head coach of the U21 squad of Tubize in 2017.

He was appointed head coach of the Togo national team in July 2024. On 29 December 2025, Togo announced the termination of their contract.

== Personal life ==
His brother Waké was a football goalkeeper.

== Honours ==
AS Douanes

- Togolese Championnat National: 2002

La Louvière

- Belgian Cup: 2002–03

RAEC Mons

- Belgian Second Division: 2005–06
