= Waké Nibombé =

Togolese footballer (1974–2025)

Personal information
- Date of birth: 19 February 1974
- Date of death: 16 October 2025 (aged 51)
- Position: Goalkeeper

Senior career*
| Years | Team | Apps | (Gls) |
| 1991–1993 | Gbikinti de Bassar | | |
| 1993–1994 | Entente II Lomé | | |
| 1994–1996 | Étoile Filante | | |
| 1996–2002 | Goldfields Obuasi | | |

International career
| 1990–1998 | Togo | 28 | (0) |
- * Club domestic league appearances and goals

Waké Nibombé (19 February 1974 – 16 October 2025) was a Togolese footballer who played as a goalkeeper.

== Club career ==
Nibombé began his professional career in his native Togo with Gbikinti de Bassar (1991–1993), Entente II Lomé (1993–1994) and Étoile Filante (1994–1996).

He joined Ghanaian club Goldfields Obuasi in 1996, with whom he won the national championship. He became Player of the Year for his performances in the 1997 season.

== International career ==
Nibombé made 54 appearances for the Togo national team. He was a squad member for the 1998 and 2000 African Cup of Nations.

== Personal life and death ==
His brother Daré is a football manager and former player.

Nibombé died on 16 October 2025, at the age of 51.
