= 1985 WAFU Club Championship =

Tournament details
- Teams: 12 (from 1 confederation)

Final positions
- Champions: (Nigeria) Africa Sports (1st title)
- Runners-up: (Ivory Coast) Ifodje Atakpamé

Tournament statistics
- Matches played: 21
- Goals scored: 72 (3.43 per match)

The 1985 WAFU Club Championship was the ninth football club tournament season that took place for the runners-up of each West African country's domestic league, the West African Club Championship. It was won by Africa Sports in two-legged final victory against Ifodje Atakpamé.

Not a single club from Niger participated.

== Preliminary round ==
The matches took place from March 30 to April 14.

Team 1	Agg.	Team 2	1st leg	2nd leg
East End Lions (Sierra Leone)	4–0	(The Gambia) Hawks	1–2	6–1
Shooting Stars FC (Nigeria)	5–0	(Benin) AS CaÏmans	1–1	6–0
Casa Sports (Senegal)	1–3	(Guinea-Bissau) UDI Bissau	0–0	1–3
Africa Sports (Ivory Coast)	5–0	(Liberia) Saint Joseph Warriors	5–0	0–3
Ifodje Atakpamé (Togo)	3–3	(Guinea) Gangan	2–0	1–3
Eleven Wise (Ghana)	2–3	(Mali) Real Bamako	2–0	0–3 (Note: The score is not known, probably Real Bamako was disqualified)
New Nigeria Bank	0–0	bye	—	—

== Quarterfinals ==
The matches took place from May 26 to June 9.

Team 1	Agg.	Team 2	1st leg	2nd leg
UDI Bissau (Guinea-Bissau)	2–4	(Ivory Coast) Africa Sports	2–0	4–0
Ifodje Atakpamé (Togo)	3–3 (4–2 p)	(Sierra Leone) East End Lions	2–1	2–1
Eleven Wise (Ghana)	3–3 (1–3 p)	(Nigeria) Shooting Stars FC	3–0	3–0
New Nigeria Bank	0–0	bye	—	—

== Semifinals ==
The matches took place from June 30 to July 14.

Team 1	Agg.	Team 2	1st leg	2nd leg
Shooting Stars FC (abd.) (Nigeria)	2–0	(Ivory Coast) Africa Sports	2–0	w/o (Note: The match was abandoned at the 20th minute, Shooting Starts abandoned the tournament and Africa Sports qualified into the finals)
New Nigeria Bank (forfeited) (Note: Due to its incidents between African Sports, New Nigeria Bank chose to play the finals on neutral ground, it was refused and the club declared its matches forfeited and Ifodje Atakpamé of Togo qualified into the finals)	8–1	(Togo) Ifodje Atakpamé	4–0	4–1

== Finals ==
The matches took place on October 20 and November 10.

Team 1	Agg.	Team 2	1st leg	2nd leg
Africa Sports (Ivory Coast)	5–0	(Togo) Ifodje Atakpamé	3–0	0–2

== Winners ==
1985 WAFU Club Championship
(Ivory Coast)
Africa Sports
First title

== See also ==
- 1985 African Cup of Champions Clubs
- 1985 CAF Cup Winners' Cup
