= Zakari Morou =

Togolese footballer

Personal information
- Date of birth: 12 December 1991 (age 34)
- Place of birth: Bafilo, Togo
- Height: 1.73 m (5 ft 8 in)
- Position: Midfielder

Senior career*
Years	Team	Apps	(Gls)
2009	Gomido		
2010–2011	Liberty Professionals		
2011–2012	Free State Stars	10	(1)
2012–2013	Al-Nahda		
2013–2015	Anges		
2016–2017	Gomido		

International career^{‡}
2010–2012	Togo	2	(0)
- * Club domestic league appearances and goals as of 12:25, 29 December 2019 (UTC) ‡ National team caps and goals as of 12:25, 29 December 2019 (UTC)

Zakari Morou (born 12 December 1991) is a Togolese international footballer who plays as a midfielder.

== Career ==
Born in Bafilo, Morou has played for Gomido, Liberty Professionals, Free State Stars, Al-Nahda and Anges.

He earned eight caps for the Togolese national team between 2010 and 2012.
