= Abdoul Moubarak Aïgba =

Togolese footballer

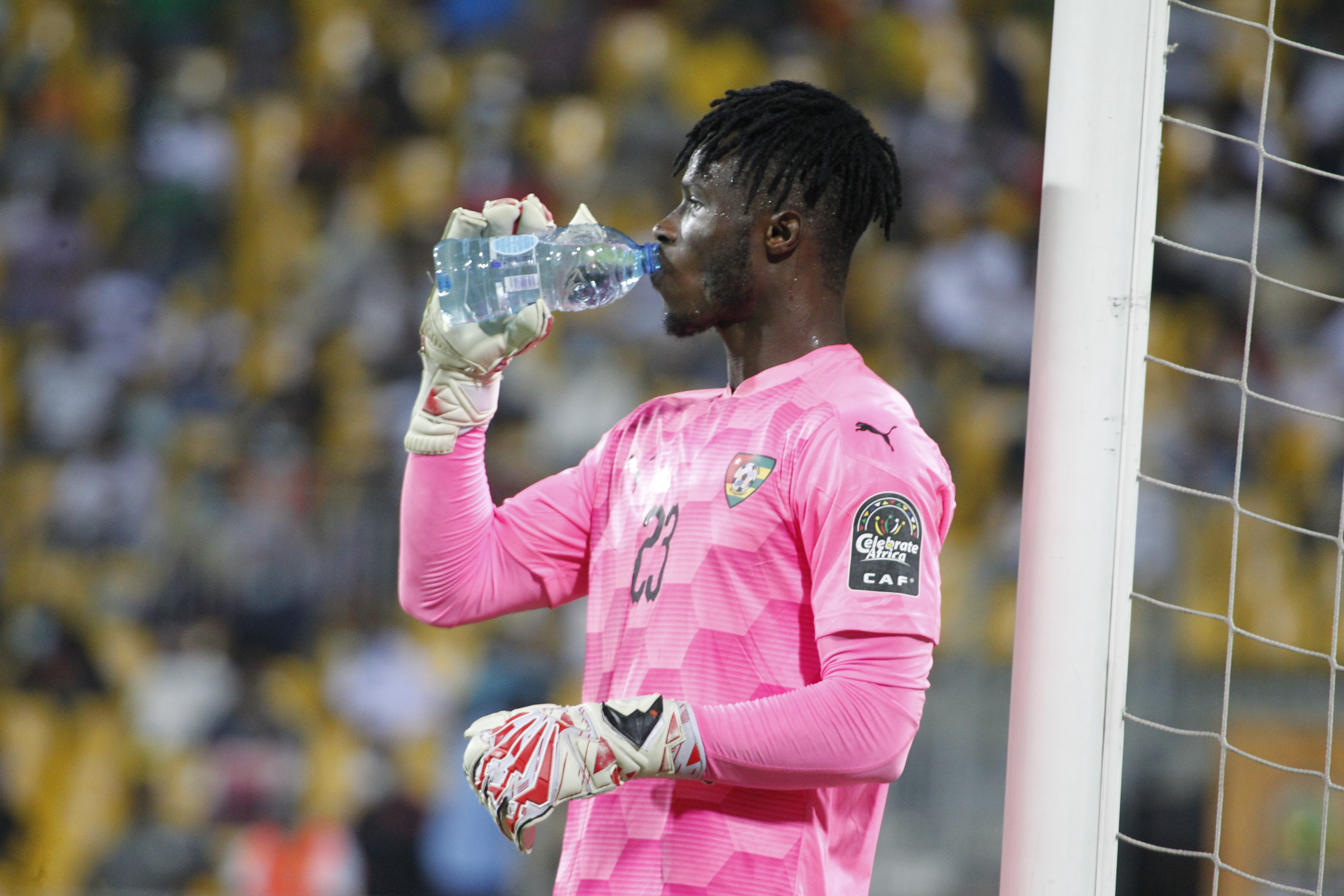
- Abdoul Moubarak Aïgba playing for Togo in 2021.

Personal information
- Date of birth: 5 August 1997 (age 29)
- Place of birth: Kara, Togo
- Height: 1.83 m (6 ft 0 in)
- Position: Goalkeeper

Team information
- Current team: Sofapaka

Senior career*
Years	Team	Apps	(Gls)
2015–2017	Ifodje Atakpamé		
2017–2021	AS Douanes		
2021–	Sofapaka	10	(0)

International career^{‡}
2017–	Togo	7	(0)
- * Club domestic league appearances and goals as of 22:37, 1 September 2021 (UTC) ‡ National team caps and goals as of 22:37, 1 September 2021 (UTC)

Abdoul Moubarak Aïgba (born 5 August 1997) is a Togolese footballer who plays as a goalkeeper for Sofapaka and the Togo national team.

== Career ==
Aïgba began his career with Togolese side Ifodje Atakpamé, before moving to AS Douanes in 2016. After a long transfer saga, he moved to the Kenyan club Sofapaka in March 2021.

== International career ==
Aïgba made his debut with the Togo national team in a 0–0 2020 African Nations Championship qualification tie with Benin on 28 July 2021.
