= Thibault Klidjé =

Togolese footballer (born 2001)

Thibault Klidje
Personal information
- Date of birth: 10 July 2001 (age 25)
- Place of birth: Hahotoé, Togo
- Height: 1.75 m (5 ft 9 in)
- Position: Forward

Team information
- Current team: Hibernian
- Number: 18

Senior career*
Years	Team	Apps	(Gls)
2017–2019	Espoir Tsevie		
2019–2020	Gomido		
2020–2022	Bordeaux B	12	(7)
2022	Bordeaux	5	(0)
2022–2025	Luzern	73	(14)
2025–	Hibernian	16	(2)
2026	→ Randers (loan)	9	(1)

International career^{‡}
2018	Togo U20	2	(0)
2021–	Togo	25	(4)
- * Club domestic league appearances and goals as of 19 May 2026 ‡ National team caps and goals as of 17 November 2026

Thibault Klidjé (born 10 July 2001) is a Togolese-French professional footballer who plays as a forward for Scottish Premiership club Hibernian, and the Togo national team. He has previously played for Bordeaux and Luzern.

== Career ==
Klidjé began his career with the Togolese clubs Espoir Tsevie, and Gomido before signing with the reserves of French club Bordeaux on 21 February 2020.

On 31 August 2022, Klidjé signed for Swiss Super League club Luzern on a three-year contract.

On 13 July 2025 Klidjé signed for Scottish Premiership club Hibernian on a three year contract, becoming their record signing. Klidjé played mainly as a substitute in the first part of the 2025–26 season, scoring four goals in 26 appearances, and was loaned to Danish Superliga club Randers on 2 February 2026.

== International career ==
He debuted with the Togo national team on 9 October 2021 in a 1–1 World Cup qualifier draw against Congo. In 2018, he represented the Togo national U20 team.

== Career statistics ==
=== Club ===
As of match played 24 May 2025

Appearances and goals by club, season and competition
Club	Season	League			Cup		Europe		Total	
Club	Season	Division	Apps	Goals	Apps	Goals	Apps	Goals	Apps	Goals
Bordeaux II	2020–21	National 3	1	0	—		—		1	0
Bordeaux II	2021–22	National 3	11	7	—		—		11	7
Bordeaux II	Total		12	7	—		—		12	7
Bordeaux	2021–22	Ligue 1	5	0	0	0	—		5	0
Luzern	2022–23	Swiss Super League	14	0	0	0	—		14	0
Luzern	2023–24	Swiss Super League	22	4	1	0	0	0	23	4
Luzern	2024–25	Swiss Super League	37	10	2	2	—		39	12
Luzern	Total		73	14	3	2	0	0	76	16
Career total			90	21	3	2	0	0	93	23

=== International ===
As of match played 17 November 2026

Appearances and goals by national team and year
National team	Year	Apps	Goals
Togo	2021	3	0
Togo	2022	3	0
Togo	2023	2	0
Togo	2024	8	1
Togo	2025	6	1
Togo	2026	3	2
Total		25	4

Togo score listed first, score column indicates score after each Klidjé goal.

List of international goals scored by Thibault Klidjé
No.	Date	Venue	Opponent	Score	Result	Competition
1	10 October 2024	19 May 1956 Stadium, Annaba, Algeria	Algeria	1–0	1–5	2025 Africa Cup of Nations qualification
2	22 March 2025	Kégué Stadium, Lomé, Togo	Mauritania	1–0	2–2	2026 FIFA World Cup qualification
3	17 November 2026	Kégué Stadium, Lomé, Togo	Algeria	1–0	3–0	2027 Africa Cup of Nations qualification
4	17 November 2026	Kégué Stadium, Lomé, Togo	Algeria	2–0	3–0	2027 Africa Cup of Nations qualification
