= Messan Toudji =

Togolese footballer (1997–2026)

Personal information
- Date of birth: 16 May 1997
- Place of birth: Adjodogou, Togo
- Date of death: 20 August 2026 (aged 29)
- Height: 1.82 m (6 ft 0 in)
- Position: Defender

Senior career*
Years	Team	Apps	(Gls)
2016–2018	Anges FC		
2019–2021	Gomido		
2021–2023	ASKO Kara		
2023–2026	AS Binah		

International career
2019–2021	Togo	7	(0)
- * Club domestic league appearances and goals

Messan Toudji (16 May 1997 – 20 August 2026) was a Togolese footballer who played as a defender.

After beginning his career with Anges FC, he also played with ASKO Kara and Gomido FC, the former of which he suited up for in the 2023 CAF Confederation Cup. He represented the Togolese national team at the 2018 Toulon Tournament and the 2020 African Nations Championship.

Toudji died on 20 August 2026, at the age of 29.
