= Togolese Football Federation =

Governing body of football in Togo

CAF
- Founded: 1960
- Headquarters: Route de Kegué - Lomé
- FIFA affiliation: 1964
- CAF affiliation: 1963
- WAFU affiliation: 1975
- President: Col.Kossi Gbézondé AKPOVY
- Vice-President: Amah Aklisso
- Website: www.ftftogo.com

The Togolese Football Federation (French: Fédération Togolaise de Football) or FTF is the governing body of football in Togo. In 2006, the Togo national football team participated for first time in the 2006 World Cup in Germany.

== Staff ==
- President: Col.Kossi Gbézondé AKPOVY
- 1st Vice President: Amah Aklisso
- 2nd Vice President: Agoro MEDJASSIRIBI
- Men's Coach: Paulo Duarte
- Women's Coach: Kaï Tomety

== Leagues ==
There are 9 major football leagues in Togo.

- Lomé Commune Lomé
- Ligue Maritime Est Aného, Tabligbo, Vo, Togoville, Akoumapé
- Ligue Maritime Ouest Lomé: Tsévié and Kévé prefectures
- Ligue de Kloto Kpalimé, Amou, Danyi
- Ligue des Plateaux Est Atakpamé, Notse, Tohoun
- Ligue des Plateaux Ouest Amlamé, Badou
- Ligue du Centre Sokodé, Tchamba, Sotouboua, Bassar, Blitta, Gérin-Kouka
- Ligue de la Kara Kara, Niamtougou, Pagouda, Bafilo
- Ligue des Savanes Dapaong, Mango, Kantè, Barkoissi, Bombouaka

== Clubs ==
Notable FTF football clubs.

- Abou Ossé FC (Anié)
- AC Semassi FC (Sokodé)
- AS Douane (Lomé)
- ASKO Kara (Kara)
- Dynamic Togolais (Lomé)
- Etoile Filante de Lomé
- Gomido FC (Kpalime)
- Kotoko FC (Lavié)
- Maranatha FC (Fiokpo)
- Tchaoudjo AC (Sokodé)
- US Kokori (Tchamba)
- US Masséda (Masseville)
- AC Merlan (Lomé)
- AS Togo-Port (Lomé)
- Foadan FC (Dapaong)
- Togo Telecom FC (Lomé)
- Sara Sport de Bafilo
