= Blaise Kouma =

Togolese footballer

Personal information
- Full name: Blaise Kouma
- Date of birth: December 31, 1988 (age 37)
- Place of birth: Lomé, Togo
- Height: 1.81 m (5 ft 11 1/2 in)
- Position: Defender

Team information
- Current team: Étoile Filante de Lomé
- Number: 3

Youth career
- 2000–2003: Étoile Filante de Lomé

Senior career*
Years	Team	Apps	(Gls)
2004–	Étoile Filante	61	(18)

International career^{‡}
2003–2005	Togo U-17	5	(0)
2006–2008	Togo U-20	16	(0)
2008	Togo U-23	11	(0)
2009–	Togo	6	(0)
- * Club domestic league appearances and goals as of 10 March 2009 ‡ National team caps and goals as of 10 March 2009

Blaise Kouma (born 31 December 1988 in Lomé) is a footballer from the Togolese Republic. He currently plays for Étoile Filante de Lomé.

== Career ==
Kouma began his career with Étoile Filante and was promoted in 2004 to the Togolese Championnat National team.

=== Position ===
He played as defensive midfielder or as a central defender.

== International career ==
The defensive midfielder represented the Togo national football team in the U-17, was the captain of the U-20 and under 23. In November 2008 played at the West African International Tournament and captained the Togo team, he selected his country at African Nation Cup for Local African player to be played in Côte d'Ivoire in February 2009.

== Honours ==
- 2004-2005 Vice champions of Togo with Étoile Filante
- 2004-2006 Vice champion of Togo with Étoile Filante
- 2006-2007 Third place in Togo championship
- 2008 West African International Tournament
- 2009 African Nation Cup for Local African
