= Claude Koutob =

Togolese footballer

Personal information
- Full name: Claude Koutob Naoto
- Date of birth: 26 December 1995 (age 30)
- Place of birth: Sokodé, Togo
- Height: 1.78 m (5 ft 10 in)
- Positions: Winger; forward

Team information
- Current team: Stade Poitevin

Senior career*
Years	Team	Apps	(Gls)
2013–2014	Gbikinti		
2014–2015	AS Marsa	2	(0)
2015–2017	Poiré-sur-Vie	16	(7)
2017–2019	Les Herbiers B	26	(13)
2017–2019	Les Herbiers	28	(2)
2019–	Stade Poitevin	7	(1)
- * Club domestic league appearances and goals as of 15:53, 18 November 2019 (UTC)

Claude Koutob Naoto (born 26 December 1995) is a Togolese footballer who plays as a winger or forward for Stade Poitevin FC.

== Club career ==
Koutob Naoto started his career in Togo with Gbikinti before moving to Tunisian side AS Marsa in 2014.

After making two professional appearances in the Tunisian Ligue Professionnelle 1, Koutob Naoto left Marsa for French outfit Poiré-sur-Vie.

== International career ==
Koutob Naoto was called up to the Togo national football team for a 2014 World Cup qualification game against the DR Congo on 8 September 2013. However, he never came off the bench.
