= Stade Municipal (Anié) =

Stade Municipal is a multi-use stadium in Anié, Togo. It is currently used mostly for football matches and is the home stadium of Abou Ossé F.C. The stadium holds 5,000 people.
