= Aboubacar Sangare =

Malian footballer (born 1999)

Personal information
- Full name: Aboubacar Bemba Sangare
- Date of birth: 29 September 1999 (age 27)
- Position: Midfielder

Team information
- Current team: Chippa United
- Number: 46

Senior career*
| Years | Team | Apps | (Gls) |
| 2017–2019 | AS Togo-Port | | |
| 2019–2020 | CS Hammam-Lif | 17 | (1) |
| 2020–2021 | Jomo Cosmos | 22 | (2) |
| 2021– | Chippa United | 13 | (0) |
| 2022 | → JDR Stars (loan) | 5 | (0) |
- * Club domestic league appearances and goals as of 1 April 2024

Aboubacar Bemba Sangare (born 29 September 1999) is a Malian professional footballer who plays as a midfielder for South African club Chippa United.

== Career ==
After playing for AS Togo-Port in Togo, CS Hammam-Lif in Tunisia and Jomo Cosmos in South Africa's National First Division, Sangare signed for South African Premier Division club Chippa United in summer 2021 on a three-year contract.
