= 2018 Coupe du Togo =

Tournament details
- Country: Togo

Final positions
- Champions: Gomido

The 2018 Coupe du Togo is the 2018 edition of the Coupe du Togo, the knockout football competition of Togo.

== First round ==
=== Région de Lomé ===
[Mar 17]

Entente II FC (Lomé) 0-0 Etoile Filante FC (Lomé) [4-3 pen]

[Mar 18]

Centre de Formation AAFA 2-2 AS OTR (Lomé) [4-1 pen]

OC Agaza FC (Lomé) 0-2 Dynamic Togolais FC (Lomé)

AS Togo-Port (Lomé) bye

=== Région Maritime ===
[Mar 17]

Olympique Football Club (Vo) 2-3 Espoir Football Club de Zio (Tsévié)

Gbohloé-su des Lacs FC (Aného) bye

=== Région des Plateaux ===
[Mar 17]

Okiti FC (Badou) 1-0 Anges FC (Notsè)

Adjiri FC 0-1 Kotoko FC (Laviè)

[Mar 18]

Ifodjè FC d'Atakpamé 0-0 Gomido FC (Kpalimé) [2-4 pen]

Maranatha FC de Fiokpo (Womé) bye

=== Région Centrale ===
[Mar 17]

US Koroki Metete FC (Tchamba) 1-0 Unisport FC (Sokodé)

[Mar 18]

Tchaoudjo Athletic Club FC (Sokodé) 1-1 Agouwa FC (Koussountou) [5-4 pen]

Odalou FC (Kambolé) 0-0 AC Sèmassi FC (Sokodé) [2-4 pen]

Kpandi Junior bye

=== Région de la Kara ===
[Mar 17]

Open de Wagandè 2-2 ASKO FC (Kara) [3-5 pen]

[Mar 18]

Sara Sport FC (Bafilo) 1-1 ASC Kara [4-5 pen]

AS Binah (Pagouda) 0-2 Gbikinti FC (Bassar)

=== Région des Savanes ===
[Mar 18]

Mosaïque FC 0-3 Foadan FC (Dapaong)

== Second round ==
=== Région de Lomé/Région Maritime ===
[Apr 11]

Dynamic Togolais FC (Lomé) 0-0 Centre de Formation AAFA [3-2 pen]

Entente II FC (Lomé) 0-1 Espoir Football Club de Zio (Tsévié)

[Apr 12]

AS Togo-Port (Lomé) 1-0 Gbohloé-su des Lacs FC (Aného)

=== Région des Plateaux ===
[Apr 11]

Gomido FC (Kpalimé) 1-0 Okiti FC (Badou)

[Apr 12]

Maranatha FC de Fiokpo (Womé) 2-1 Kotoko FC (Laviè)

=== Région Centrale ===
[Apr 11]

AC Sèmassi FC (Sokodé) 2-1 US Koroki Metete FC (Tchamba)

[Apr 12]

Kpandi Junior 1-3 Tchaoudjo Athletic Club FC (Sokodé)

=== Région de la Kara/Région des Savanes ===
[Apr 11]

ASC Kara 3-0 Gbikinti FC (Bassar)

[Apr 12]

Foadan FC (Dapaong) 1-1 ASKO FC (Kara) [11-10 pen]

NB: ASKO FC (Kara) qualified as lucky loser.

== Third round ==
[May 9]

AS Togo-Port (Lomé) 1-0 Espoir Football Club de Zio (Tsévié)

Dynamic Togolais FC (Lomé) 1-0 Tchaoudjo Athletic Club FC (Sokodé)

Gomido FC (Kpalimé) 1-0 Maranatha FC de Fiokpo (Womé)

ASC Kara 1-2 Foadan FC (Dapaong)

AC Sèmassi FC (Sokodé) 3-1 ASKO FC (Kara)

NB: ASC Kara qualified as lucky loser.

== Fourth round ==
[May 23]

Foadan FC (Dapaong) 0-1 Gomido FC (Kpalimé)

ASC Kara 1-0 AS Togo-Port (Lomé)

Dynamic Togolais FC (Lomé) 2-1 AC Sèmassi FC (Sokodé)

NB: AC Sèmassi FC (Sokodé) qualified as lucky loser.

== Semi-finals ==
[May 30]

Dynamic Togolais FC (Lomé) 0-0 ASC Kara [9-8 pen]

Gomido FC (Kpalimé) 1-1 AC Sèmassi FC (Sokodé) [3-0 pen]

== Final ==
[Jun 9, Stade Municipal, Lomé]

Gomido FC (Kpalimé) 3-0 Dynamic Togolais FC (Lomé)

== See also ==
- 2017–18 Togolese Championnat National
