= Lomé I =

Togolese football club

- Full name: Lomé I
- Nickname: Super club of Lomé
- Founded: 1974
- Dissolved: 1978
- Ground: Stade Général Eyadema; Lomé, Togo
- Capacity: 15,000

Lomé I, named later Déma Club de Lomé was a Togolese professional football club based in Lomé. It was founded in 1974 as part of the sports reform of the Togolese Football Federation by merging Étoile Filante de Lomé, Modèle de Lomé and Dynamic Togolais. In 1978, the club was dissolved as part of the second sport reform. Their home stadium was Stade Général Eyadema.

== Honours ==
- Togolese Championnat National: 3

1974, 1975, 1976
