= 1985 African Cup Winners' Cup =

Tournament details
- Dates: April – 7 December 1985
- Teams: 35 (from 1 confederation)

Final positions
- Champions: (Egypt) Al Ahly (2nd title)
- Runners-up: (Nigeria) Leventis United

Tournament statistics
- Matches played: 64
- Goals scored: 144 (2.25 per match)

The 1984 season of the African Cup Winners' Cup football club tournament was won by Al Ahly in two-legged final victory against Leventis United. This was the eleventh season that the tournament took place for the winners of each African country's domestic cup. Thirty-five sides entered the competition, with Racing Club de Bobo withdrawing before the 1st leg of the first round.

== Preliminary round ==
Team 1	Agg.	Team 2	1st leg	2nd leg
Dragons de l'Ouémé (Benin)	10–1	(Equatorial Guinea) Atlético Malabo	8–0	2–1
Inter FC (Burundi)	3–3 (a)^{1}	(Somalia) Waxool FC	3–1	0–2
ASC Trarza (Mauritania)	w/o	(Burkina Faso) RC Bobo Dioulasso	—	—

- 1:Waxool FC were disqualified for fielding an ineligible player

== First round ==
Team 1	Agg.	Team 2	1st leg	2nd leg
AFC Leopards (Kenya)	3–2	(Sudan) Al-Merrikh	2–0	1–2
AS Marsa (Tunisia)	0–5	(Egypt) Al Ahly	0–1	0–4
Djoliba AC (Mali)	0–2	(Algeria) MP Oran	0–0	0–2
Dragons de l'Ouémé (Benin)	3–2	(Zaire) CS Imana^{1}	3–1	0–1
Horoya AC (Guinea)	2–1	(The Gambia) Wallidan F.C.	2–0	0–1
Inter FC (Burundi)	1–5	(Uganda) Kampala City Council FC	1–2	0–3
ASC Jeanne d'Arc (Senegal)	2–0	(Morocco) RS Kenitra	1–0	1–0
Lioli FC (Lesotho)	2–3	(Zimbabwe) Gweru United FC	1–1	1–2
Manzini Wanderers (Eswatini)	0–2	(Zambia) Mufulira Wanderers	0–0	0–2
Mighty Barolle (Liberia)	1–3	(Ghana) Asante Kotoko	1–0	0–3
Old Edwardians (Sierra Leone)	1–4	(Nigeria) Leventis United	0–0	1–4
Primeiro de Agosto (Angola)	1–3	(Cameroon) Dihep di Nkam	1–0	0–3
Stade Centrafricain (Central African Republic)	3–4	(Togo) ASFOSA Lomé	3–2	0–2
Simba SC (Tanzania)	5–1	(Ethiopia) Eritrea Shoe Factory	5–0	0–1
Stade d'Abidjan (Ivory Coast)	4–6	(Gabon) FC 105 Libreville	3–1	1–5
ASC Trarza (Mauritania)	1–3	(Libya) Al-Nasr	1–1	0–2

- 1:Following crowd trouble at the end of the 2nd leg, CS Imana were forced to rename themselves DC Motema Pembe by CAF.

== Second round ==
Team 1	Agg.	Team 2	1st leg	2nd leg
ASFOSA Lomé (Togo)	1–1 (a)	(Ghana) Asante Kotoko	1–1	0–0
Dragons de l'Ouémé (Benin)	2–2 (a)	(Cameroon) Dihep di Nkam	1–0	1–2
FC 105 Libreville (Gabon)	3–4	(Libya) Al-Nasr	2–1	1–3
ASC Jeanne d'Arc (Senegal)	1–1 (a)	(Algeria) MP Oran	0–0	1–1
Kampala City Council FC (Uganda)	4–2	(Zimbabwe) Gweru United FC	3–1	1–1
Leventis United (Nigeria)	1–1 (a)	(Guinea) Horoya AC	0–0	1–1
Mufulira Wanderers (Zambia)	2–2 (3–5 p)	(Kenya) AFC Leopards	1–1	1–1
Simba SC (Tanzania)	2–3	(Egypt) Al Ahly	2–1	0–2

28 April 1985

ASC Jeanne d'Arc (Senegal)	0–0	(Algeria) MP Oran

Stade Demba Diop, Dakar
10 May 1985
17:00

MP Oran (Algeria)	1–1	(Senegal) ASC Jeanne d'Arc
Sebbah 49'; Benarmas (penalty missed) 77' (pen)		Touré 29'

19 June Stadium, Oran
Attendance: 28,996
Referee: Idrissa Sarr (Mauritania)

== Quarterfinals ==
Team 1	Agg.	Team 2	1st leg	2nd leg
Asante Kotoko (Ghana)	2–2 (4–5 p)	(Kenya) AFC Leopards	2–0	0–2
Dragons de l'Ouémé (Benin)	1–5	(Egypt) Al Ahly	1–1	0–4
ASC Jeanne d'Arc (Senegal)	0–2	(Nigeria) Leventis United	0–1	0–1
Kampala City Council FC (Uganda)	1–1 (2–4 p)	(Libya) Al-Nasr	1–0	0–1

== Semifinals ==
Team 1	Agg.	Team 2	1st leg	2nd leg
Leventis United (Nigeria)	2–1	(Kenya) AFC Leopards	2–0	0–1
Al Ahly (Egypt)	w/o^{1}	(Libya) Al-Nasr	—	—

- 1:Al-Nasr withdrew before the 1st leg for political reasons (refusing to play Egyptian teams).

== Final ==
Team 1	Agg.	Team 2	1st leg	2nd leg
Al Ahly (Egypt)	2–1	(Nigeria) Leventis United	2–0	0–1

== Champions ==
African Cup Winners' Cup Winners
(Egypt)
Al Ahly
Second title
