= Kakadlé FC =

Football club

Kakadlé F.C. is a Togolese football club based in Niamtougou. They played in the top division in Togolese football until their relegation in 2024. Their home stadium is Stade Municipal.
