= Doumbé FC =

Togolese football club

Doumbé
- Full name: Doumbé F.C.
- Ground: Stade Municipal, Sansanne Mango, Togo
- Capacity: 10,000
- League: Togolese Championnat National
- 2024–25: 14th
Home colours	Away colours

Doumbé F.C. is a Togolese football club based in Sansanne Mango. They play in the top division in Togolese football. Their home stadium is Stade Municipal.

== Achievements ==
- Togolese Championnat National: 1

1987

- Coupe du Togo: 1

1996

== Performance in CAF competitions ==
- African Cup of Champions Clubs: 1 appearance

1988: First Round
