= ASFOSA =

Togolese football club

- Full name: ASFOSA Lomé
- Ground: Stade Agoè-Nyivé, Lomé, Togo
- Capacity: 10,000
- Chairman: (Togo)
- Manager: (Togo)
- League: Togolese Championnat National

ASFOSA Lomé is a Togolese football club based in Lomé. They play in the Togolese Second Division.

In 1966 the team has won the Togolese Championnat National.

== Stadium ==
Their home stadium is Stade Agoè-Nyivé.

== Achievements ==
- Togolese Championnat National: 2

1985, 1986

== Performance in CAF competitions ==
- African Cup of Champions Clubs: 2 appearances

1986 African Cup of Champions Clubs: First Round
1987 African Cup of Champions Clubs: First Round
