= Safiou Salifou =

Togolese footballer

Personal information
- Date of birth: 11 August 1982 (age 44)
- Place of birth: Lama-Kara, Togo
- Position: Goalkeeper

Senior career*
Years	Team	Apps	(Gls)
2001–2002	ASKO Kara		
2004–2015	Dynamic Togolais		

International career
2004	Togo	1	(0)
- * Club domestic league appearances and goals

Safiou Salifou (born 11 August 1982) is a Togolese former professional footballer who played as a goalkeeper. He played in one match for the Togo national team in 2004. He was also named in Togo's squad for the 2002 African Cup of Nations tournament.
