= Mani Ougadja =

Togolese footballer

Personal information
- Full name: Richard Mani Ougadja
- Date of birth: 31 January 1988 (age 38)
- Place of birth: Togo
- Position: Midfielder

Team information
- Current team: ASC Kara

Senior career*
Years	Team	Apps	(Gls)
2019–	ASC Kara		

International career^{‡}
2021–	Togo	1	(0)
- * Club domestic league appearances and goals as of 22:37, 1 September 2021 (UTC) ‡ National team caps and goals as of 22:37, 1 September 2021 (UTC)

Richard Mani Ougadja (born 31 January 1988) is a Togolese footballer who plays as a midfielder for ASC Kara and the Togo national team.

== International career ==
Ougadja made his debut with the Togo national team in a friendly 2–0 win over Guinea on 5 June 2021.

== Personal life ==
Mani worked as a teacher of physical education, before concentrating on football. He was 33 at the age of his first international callup. He is the brother of the footballer Mani Sapol.
