= Magnima Tawali =

Togolese footballer

Magunima Tawali
Personal information
- Full name: Magunima Tawali
- Date of birth: December 31, 1988 (age 37)
- Place of birth: Kpalimé, Togo
- Height: 1.86 m (6 ft 1 in)
- Position: Defender

Team information
- Current team: Gomido
- Number: 5

Youth career
- –2000: Diwa Start

Senior career*
Years	Team	Apps	(Gls)
2001–2003	Diwa Start	36	(0)
2003–	Gomido	79	(19)
2005–2006	→ Maranatha F.C. (loan)	23	(2)

International career
2005–2007	Togo U-17	18	(2)
2007–2008	Togo U-20	14	(0)
2008	Togo U-23	6	(0)
2009–	Togo	1	(0)
- * Club domestic league appearances and goals

Magunima Tawali (born December 31, 1988, in Kpalimé) is a Togolese footballer, who plays for Gomido.

== Career ==
Tawali began his career at the age from 16 with Diwa Start in Kpalimé. In 2005, he signed with the city rival Gomido. The club loaned him in January 2006 to Maranatha F.C. for one year, and he returned in July 2007.
