= Thomas Djilan =

Beninese footballer

Personal information
- Date of birth: 14 January 1983 (age 43)
- Position: Goalkeeper

Senior career*
Years	Team	Apps	(Gls)
–2000	Dynamic Togolais		
2001–2003	Lions de l'Atakory		
2004	Postel Sport FC		
2005–2006	AS Dragons FC de l'Ouémé		
2006	Renacimiento FC		

International career
2001–2006	Benin	3	(0)
- * Club domestic league appearances and goals

Thomas Djilan (born 14 January 1983) is a retired Beninese football goalkeeper.
