= Espoir Tsevie =

Togolese football club

Espoir
- Full name: Espoir FC (Tsévié)
- Ground: Espoir Stadium; Tsévié, Togo
- Capacity: 5,000
- League: Togolese Championnat League 2
- 2017/18: 14th, League 1 ▼

Espoir Tsévié is a Togolese football club based in Tsévié. They currently play in the two division in Togolese football, the Togolese Championnat League 2.

== History ==
Records for Togolese football kept by RSSSF are fragmentary for anything below the top division. However, they do indicate that Espoir have been playing in the Togolese second division, perhaps erratically, since at least 2002, when they also reached the last 32 of the national cup, losing out 1–0 to Agaza Omnisports de Lomé They fared better three years later, reaching the last sixteen of the cup before losing to Dyto FC de Lomé The following year, they finished second in Group C of the second division on 17 points behind Anges de Notsè, qualifying for the playoff phase. They lost in the quarterfinals of the playoffs to Union Sportive de Masséda, 2–0 away in the first leg and then 1–0 at home in the second. In the 2009 season (which was interrupted at the end of 2009 and did not in fact finish until 2011, with no games being played at all in 2010) Espoir finished in third place on 22 points, narrowly missing out on the play off rounds. Their performance the following season was equally mediocre, and although records are fragmentary, they finished no higher than sixth in the final standings. In 2014, they again finished in mid table in the group stage of the second division finishing on 10 points, a reduced number of competitors in each group from previous seasons meaning that they finished only one point above relegation.

== Stadium ==
The club plays their home matches at Espoir Stadium, which has a maximum capacity of 5,000 people

Espoir Stadium is a stadium in Tsévié, Togo. It is currently used mostly for football matches, is the home stadium of Espoir Tsévié.
