= Komlan Amewou =

Togolese footballer (born 1983)

Komi Amewou
Personal information
- Full name: Komlan Amewou
- Date of birth: 15 December 1983 (age 42)
- Place of birth: Lomé, Togo
- Height: 1.66 m (5 ft 5 in)
- Position: Midfielder

Senior career*
Years	Team	Apps	(Gls)
2002–2004	Heart of Lions		
2004–2005	Gloria Buzău	0	(0)
2005	→ Olympic Azzaweya SC (loan)		
2006–2008	OC Agaza 31	14	(3)
2008–2010	Strømsgodset IF	49	(1)
2010–2013	Nîmes	63	(0)
2014–2015	Al-Shaab CSC		
2015–2016	Sur SC		

International career
2000–2015	Togo	69	(5)
- * Club domestic league appearances and goals

Komlan Amewou (born 15 December 1983) is a Togolese former professional footballer who played as a midfielder. He capped for the Togo national team.

== Club career ==
Amewou was born in Lomé, Togo. In January 2008 he moved from Togo-based club OC Agaza to Norwegian club Strømsgodset IF. Before moving back to Togo he was one of the best midfielders in Ghana, he played for Heart of Lions in Kpandu.

On 11 June 2010, the French Ligue 2 club Nîmes Olympique signed the Togolese midfielder on a three-year contract, he joined for an undisclosed fee from Strømsgodset IF.

== International career ==
Amewou was a member of the Togo national team.

In 2013 he played in all matches at 2013 Africa Cup of Nations where his team reached the quarter-finals.

=== International goals ===
Scores and results list Togo's goal tally first, score column indicates score after Amewou goal.

List of international goals scored by Komlan Amewou
No.	Date	Venue	Opponent	Score	Result	Competition
1	9 June 2013	Stade de Kégué, Lomé, Togo	Cameroon	1–0	2–0	2014 FIFA World Cup qualification
