= Korikossa d'Atakpamé =

Togolese football club

- Full name: Korikossa d'Atakpamé
- Ground: Guanha Usdao Pesihu; Atakpame, Togo
- Capacity: 4,000
- League: Togolese Championnat League 2
Home colours	Away colours

Korikossa d'Atakpamé is a Togolese football, or soccer, club based in Atakpamé. They play in the two division in Togolese football, the Togolese Championnat League 2.

The club played in the 2004/05 Togolese Cup.

== Stadium ==
The club plays their home matches at Guanha Usdao Pesihu, which has a maximum capacity of 4,000 people

Guanha Usdao Pesihu is a stadium in Atakpamé, Togo. It is currently used mostly for football matches, is the home stadium of Korikossa Atakpame.
