= Stade Municipal (Notsé) =

Sports venue in Notsé, Togo

Stade Municipal is a multi-use stadium in Notsé, Togo. It is currently used mostly for football matches and is the home stadium of Anges FC. The stadium holds 1,000 people.
