= Abou Ossé FC =

Association football club in Togo

Abou Ossé
- Full name: Abou Ossé F.C.
- Ground: Stade Municipal, Anié, Togo
- Capacity: 5,000
- League: Togolese Championnat National
- 2009: 9th
| Home colours | Away colours |

Abou Ossé F.C. is a Togolese football club based in Anié.

In 2023 they played in the third division in Togolese football. Their home stadium is Stade Municipal.
