= Anié =

Town in Togo

Coordinates: 7.7611°N 1.1917°E

- Location in Togo
- Country: Togo

Anié or Ana is a town in the Plateaux Region of Togo, about 26 km north of Atakpame. It is served by a station on the national railway network.

In the early French occupation, the Kabye people were forcibly moved which led them to create new towns, Anié being one.
