= Ifodje Atakpamé =

Togolese football club

Ifodje
- Full name: Ifodje Atakpamé
- Ground: Guanha Usdao Pesihu, Atakpamé, Togo
- Capacity: 4,000
- Chairman: (Togo) Claude Hundélé
- Manager: (Togo) Jérémy Gbaguidi
- League: Togolese Second Division

Ifodje Atakpamé is a Togolese football club based in Atakpamé. They play in the Togolese Second Division.

In 1990 the team has won the Togolese Championnat National.

== Stadium ==
Their home stadium is Guanha Usdao Pesihu.

== Achievements ==
- Togolese Championnat National

Champions (1): 1990

== Performance in CAF competitions ==
- African Cup of Champions Clubs: 1 appearance

1991 African Cup of Champions Clubs – First Round
