= Leventis United F.C. =

Nigerian football club

Leventis United
- Full name: Leventis United Football Club
- Short name: Leventis
- Founded: 1982
- Dissolved: 1988

Leventis United was a football team based in Ibadan, Nigeria. It was founded in 1982 as an amalgam of clubs from Oyo State, backed by the Royal Nigeria Carpet company; a subsidiary of Greek corporation Leventis.

Leventis won the Third Division in 1984, the same year they won the FA Cup. The following year, they were promoted to the First Division after winning the Second Division with an undefeated record, a first in Nigerian football history. Under the management of John Mastoroudes, the team quickly became one of the best financed sides in the country. However, the club suffered during the late 1980s due to recession and political instability. The Leventis Company withdrew financial support, leading to the team's disbandment after the 1987 league season. After two decades, a grassroots effort was made to resurrect the team, but proved unsuccessful.

== Achievements ==
- Nigerian Premier League: 1

1986. (third straight title in 3 different divisions).

- Nigerian FA Cup: 2

1984, 1986.

- Nigerian Super Cup: 1

1984.

== Performance in CAF competitions ==
- African Cup Winners' Cup:
  - 1985: Runners-up
- African Cup of Champions Clubs:
  - 1987: Quarter-finals
