= CO Modèle de Lomé =

Togolese football club

- Full name: Club Omnisports Modèle de Lomé
- Founded: 1935
- Ground: Stade Agoè-Nyivé, Lomé, Togo
- Capacity: 10,000
- Chairman: (Togo)
- Manager: (Togo)
- League: Togolese Second Division
- 2013: 2nd place

Club Omnisports Modèle de Lomé is a Togolese football and basketball club based in Lomé. They play in the Togolese Second Division.

In 1966 the team has won the Togolese Championnat National.

== Stadium ==
Their home stadium is Stade Agoè-Nyivé.

== Achievements ==
- Togolese Championnat National

Champions (4): 1966, 1969, 1972, 1973

== Performance in CAF competitions ==
- African Cup of Champions Clubs: 2 appearances

1967 – First Round
1973 – First Round
