= US Koroki =

Togolese football club

- Full name: US Koroki
- Ground: Stade Maman N'Danida, Tchamba, Togo
- Capacity: 5,000
- League: Togolese Championnat National
- 2024–25: 4th, Second Division B group
Home colours	Away colours

US Koroki is a Togolese football club based in Tchamba. They play in the top division in Togolese football. Their home stadium is Stade Maman N'Danida.

== Achievements ==
- Togolese Championnat National: 1

2018
