= Stade Municipal (Kpalimé) =

Coordinates: 6.90464°N 0.63358°E

Stade Municipal is a multi-use stadium in Kpalimé, Togo. It is currently used mostly for football matches and is the home stadium of Gomido. The stadium holds 10,000 people.
