= Stade Municipal (Kara) =

Stadium in Kara, Togo

Coordinates: 9.5509°N 1.1906°E

Stade Municipal is a multi-use stadium in Kara, Togo. It is currently used mostly for football matches and is the home stadium of ASKO Kara, which won the Togo football championship in 2021. The stadium holds 10,000 people.
