= Togolese Championnat National de 2ème Division =

Togolese Second Division
- Country: Togo
- Confederation: CAF
- Number of clubs: 8
- Level on pyramid: 2
- Relegation to: Togolese Third Division
- Domestic cup: Coupe du Togo
- International cup(s): Champions League; Confederation Cup

The Togolese Second Division is a football league featuring clubs from Togo, and is the second competition of Togolese football. It is administered by the Togolese Football Federation.

== Clubs ==
- Abou Ossé
- Agouwa de Koussountou
- Odalou de Kabolé
- Sara Sport de Bafilo
- ASCK de Kara
- AS Binah de Pagouda
- Tigre Noir de Cinkassé
- AS Dankpen
- Doumbé de Mango
