= ASC Kara =

Togolese football club

ASC Kozah
- Full name: Association Sportive des Conducteurs de Kozah
- Nickname: ASCK
- Ground: Stade Municipal
- Capacity: 10,000
- Chairman: Laurent Tchanilé
- Manager: Alexandre Yentchabre
- Coach: Luc Korodowou
- League: Togolese Championnat National
- 2025–26: Champions

ASC Kozah is a Togolese football club based in the city of Kara. They won the 2018–19 Togolese Championnat National. In 2025, ASC Kara won the top-flight football league of Togo for the second time in their history.
