= Étoile Filante du Togo =

Togolese football club

Étoile Filante
- Full name: Étoile Filante du Togo
- Founded: 1932
- Ground: Stade Oscar Anthony, Lomé, Togo
- Capacity: 2,000
- League: Togolese Championnat National
- 2025–26: 3rd
Home colours	Away colours

Étoile Filante du Togo is a professional Togolese football club based in Lomé. Their home stadium is Stade Oscar Anthony. The club name translates as "Shooting Star of Lomé" and are known locally as "The Meteors".

Étoile Filante has won the national league championship seven times and were defeated finalists in the 1968 African Cup of Champions Clubs.

On 26 November 2011, some of the team's players were killed or injured in a bus crash near the Togolese city of Atakpame whilst travelling to a match.

== History ==
The club was founded in 1932 under the name of Étoile Filante de Lomé. In 1974 and as part of the sports reform, the club is dissolved by the Togolese Football Federation and merged with Modèle de Lomé and Dynamic Togolais to form the club Lomé I which was later called Déma Club de Lomé. In 1978, Déma Club was dissolved as part of the second sports reform. In the 1990s, the club Étoile Filante is reformed and wins the championship in 1992.

== Honours ==
- Togolese Championnat National: 7

1961, 1962, 1964, 1965, 1967, 1968, 1992

- Coupe du Togo: 4

1956, 1958, 1961, 1994
Finalists: 1996

- African Champions League: 0

Finalists: 1968

- French West African Cup: 1

1960

== Performance in CAF competitions ==
- African Cup of Champions Clubs: 3 appearances

1966: First Round
1968: Finalist
1969: Quarter-Finals
1993: Preliminary Round

- CAF Cup: 2 appearances

1996 – First Round
1998 – First Round

- CAF Cup Winners' Cup: 1 appearance

1995 – First Round

== Current squad ==
Note: Flags indicate national team as defined under FIFA eligibility rules; some limited exceptions apply. Players may hold more than one non-FIFA nationality.

No.	Pos.	Nation	Player
6	MF	TOG	Blaise Kouma
15	DF	TOG	Ayao Akpah Foly

No.	Pos.	Nation	Player
17	MF	TOG	Tchibiakou Doevi
-	MF	TOG	Kodjo Doumassesse
-	FW	TOG	Abibou Mouhamadou

== Presidents (1933–60) ==
- Victor Atakpmey (1933–34)
- Philipe Nasr (1934–43)
- Ernest Sogodzo Kebey (1943–50)
- Stanislas Segbeaya (1950–51)
- Nicolas Djondjo (1952–55)
- Joseph Firmin Abalo (1958–60)
