= Togolese Championnat National =

Championnat National de Premiere Division
- Founded: 1961
- Country: Togo
- Confederation: Confederation of African Football
- Number of clubs: 14
- Level on pyramid: 1
- Domestic cup: Coupe du Togo
- International cup(s): Champions League; Confederation Cup
- Current champions: ASC Kara (3rd title) (2025–26)
- Most championships: AC Semassi (10 titles)

The Championnat National de Premiere Division is a football league featuring clubs from Togo, and is the primary competition of Togolese football. Founded in 1961, it is administered by the Togolese Football Federation.

== 2021−22 clubs ==
=== Group A ===
- Anges FC (Notsé)
- AS Gbohloé-Su des Lacs (Aného)
- AS OTR (Lomé)
- AS Togo-Port (Lomé)
- Dynamic Togolais (Lomé)
- Entente II (Lomé)
- Gomido FC (Kpalime)
- Kotoko FC (Lavié)

=== Group B ===
- AC Semassi (Sokodé)
- ASC Kara (Kara)
- ASKO Kara (Kara)
- Binah FC (Pagouda)
- Ifodje Atakpamé (Atakpamé)
- Kakadlé FC (Niamtougou)
- Sara Sport FC (Bafilo)
- Unisport FC (Sokodé)

== Previous winners ==
Years	Champions
1961	Étoile Filante de Lomé (1)
1962	Étoile Filante de Lomé (2)
1963	Not held
1964	Étoile Filante de Lomé (3)
1965	Étoile Filante de Lomé (4)
1966	Modèle de Lomé (1)
1967	Étoile Filante de Lomé (5)
1968	Étoile Filante de Lomé (6)
1969	Modèle de Lomé (2)
1970	Dynamic Togolais (1)
1971	Dynamic Togolais (2)
1972	Modèle de Lomé (3)
1973	Modèle de Lomé (4)
1974	Lomé I (1)
1975	Lomé I (2)
1976	Lomé I (3)
1977	Not held
1978	AC Semassi (1)
1979	AC Semassi (2)
1980	OC Agaza (1)
1981	AC Semassi (3)
1982	AC Semassi (4)
1983	AC Semassi (5)
1984	OC Agaza (2)
1985	ASFOSA (1)
1986	ASFOSA (2)
1987	Doumbé FC (1)
1988	ASKO Kara (1)
1989	ASKO Kara (2)
1990	Ifodje Atakpamé (1)
1991	No held
1992	Étoile Filante de Lomé (7)
1993	AC Semassi (6)
1994	AC Semassi (7)
1995	AC Semassi (8)
1996	ASKO Kara (3)
1997	Dynamic Togolais (3)
1998	Not held
1999	AC Semassi (9)
2000	Not finished
2001	Dynamic Togolais (4)
2002	AS Douanes (1)
2003–04	Dynamic Togolais (5)
2004–05	AS Douanes (2)
2005–06	Maranatha FC (1)
2006–07	ASKO Kara (4)
2008	Not held
2009	Maranatha FC (2)
2010	Not held
2011–12	Dynamic Togolais (6)
2013	Anges FC de Notsé
2014	AC Semassi (10)
2015	Not held
2016–17	AS Togo-Port (1)
2017–18	US Koroki (1)
2018–19	ASC Kara (1)
2019–20	ASKO Kara (5)
2020–21	ASKO Kara (6)
2021–22	ASKO Kara (7)
2022–23	ASKO Kara (8)
2023–24	ASKO Kara (9)
2024–25	ASC Kara (2)
2025–26	ASC Kara (3)

== Performance by club ==
Club	Winners
AC Semassi	10
ASKO Kara	9
Étoile Filante	7
Dynamic Togolais	6
Modèle Lomé	4
Lomé I	3
ASC Kara	3
OC Agaza	2
ASFOSA	2
AS Douanes	2
Maranatha	2
Doumbé	1
Ifodje	1
Anges	1
AS Togo-Port	1
US Koroki	1

== Qualification for CAF competitions ==
=== Association ranking for the 2025–26 CAF club season ===
The association ranking for the 2025–26 CAF Champions League and the 2025–26 CAF Confederation Cup will be based on results from each CAF club competition from 2020–21 to the 2024–25 season.

Legend

- CL: CAF Champions League
- CC: CAF Confederation Cup
- ≥: Associations points might increase on basis of its clubs performance in 2024–25 CAF club competitions
- Associations ranked 1–12 are eligible to enter two teams in each CAF club competition.

Rank			Association	2020–21 (× 1)		2021–22 (× 2)		2022–23 (× 3)		2023–24 (× 4)		2024–25 (× 5)		Total
2025	2024	Mvt	Association	CL	CC	CL	CC	CL	CC	CL	CC	CL	CC	Total
1	1	—	Egypt	8	3	7	4	8	2.5	7	7	10	4	190.5
2	2	—	Morocco	4	6	9	5	8	2	2	4	5	5	142
3	4	+1	South Africa	8	2	5	4	4	3	4	1.5	9	3	131
4	3	-1	Algeria	6	5	7	1	6	5	2	3	5	5	130
5	6	+1	Tanzania	3	0.5	0	2	3	4	6	0	2	4	82.5
6	5	-1	Tunisia	4	3	5	1	4	2	6	1	3	0.5	82.5
7	8	+1	Angola	1	0	5	0	2	0	3	1.5	2	2	55
8	7	-1	DR Congo	4	0	0	3	1	2	4	0	2	0	45
9	9	—	Sudan	3	0	3	0	3	0	2	0	3	0	41
10	11	+1	Ivory Coast	0	0	0	1	0	3	3	0	1	2	38
11	10	-1	Libya	0	0.5	0	5	0	0.5	0	3	0	0	24
12	12	—	Nigeria	0	2	0	0	0	2	0	2	0	1	21
13	15	+2	Mali	0	0	0	0	0	1	0	2	1	0.5	18.5
14	14	—	Ghana	0	0	0	0	0	0	1	3	0	0	16
15	13	-2	Guinea	2	0	1	0	2	0	0	0.5	0	0	12
16	19	+3	Botswana	0	0	1	0	0	0	1	0	0	0.5	8.5
17	21	+4	Senegal	1	2	0	0	0	0	0	0	0	1	8
18	17	-1	Mauritania	0	0	0	0	0	0	2	0	0	0	8
19	18	-1	Congo	0	0	0	1	0	1	0	0.5	0	0	7
20	16	-4	Cameroon	0	3	0	0.5	1	0	0	0	0	0	7
21	22	+1	Togo	0	0	0	0	0	1	0	0	0	0	3
22	22	—	Uganda	0	0	0	0	1	0	0	0	0	0	3
23	-	new	Mozambique	0	0	0	0	0	0	0	0	0	0.5	2.5
24	20	-4	Zambia	0	1.5	0	0.5	0	0	0	0	0	0	2.5
25	24	-1	Eswatini	0	0	0	0.5	0	0	0	0	0	0	1
25	24	-1	Niger	0	0	0	0.5	0	0	0	0	0	0	1
27	26	-1	Burkina Faso	0	0.5	0	0	0	0	0	0	0	0	0.5

== Top goalscorers ==
Year	Best scorers	Team	Goals
2000	(Togo) Mohamed Dini	Agaza	8
2004–05	(Togo) Koumaï Madjabaou	Douanes	
2006–07	Mawuli Houedakor	Togo Telecom	
2011–12	(Togo) Euloge Placca Fessou	Agaza	19
2012–13	(Togo) Saibou Badarou	Douanes	14
2016–17	(Togo) Ashraf Agoro	Unispor	13
2021–22	(Mali) Abdoul Razak Coulibaly	ASC Kara	14
2022–23	(Togo) Justin Barowheou	ASKO Kara	17
2023–24	(Togo) Bruno Avotor	OTR	15

== Multiple hat-tricks ==
Rank	Country	Scorer	Hat-tricks
1	(Togo)	Justin Barowheou	2
2	(Togo)	Bruno Avotor	1
2	(Mali)	Abdoul Razak Coulibaly	1
2	(Togo)	Abdou Ouattara	1
