= Sara Sport FC =

Togolese football club

- Full name: Sara Sport Football Club
- Ground: Stade Municipal Bafilo, Bafilo, Togo
- Capacity: 1,000
- Chairman: Léon Ouro-Gnazo
- Manager: Étienne Esso-Wavana
- League: Togolese Second Division
- 2023–24: 8th in Second Division, B Group

Sara Sport Football Club is a Togolese football club based in Bafilo. They play in the second division in Togolese football.

== Stadium ==
Currently the team plays at the 1000 capacity Stade Municipal Bafilo.

== League participations ==
- Togolese Championnat National:2011–2012
- Togolese Second Division:2012–

== Performance in CAF competitions ==
- CAF Cup: 1 appearance

2002 –

== Performance in Coupe du Togo ==
Final 2001:Dynamic Togolais (Lomé) 3–0 Sara Sport de Bafilo
