= Gbikinti FC de Bassar =

Association football club in Togo

Gbikinti FC is a Togolese football club, based in Bassar. They play in the top division in Togolese football. Stade de Bassar, which has capacity for 1,000 people, is the venue of Gbikinti.
