= Anges FC =

Association football club in Togo

- Full name: Anges Football Club
- Ground: Stade Municipal, Notsé
- Capacity: 1,000
- Chairman: Éric Gagou
- Manager: Olivier Yaro
- League: Deuxième Division
- 2024–25: 8th, Group B

Anges Football Club is a Togolese football club based in Notsé. In the 2024/25 season they placed eighth in the Second Division, relegating them to the Third Division. Their home stadium is the 1,000 capacity Stade des Anges.

== History ==
Anges won the 2013 Togolese Championnat National. This qualified the club for the 2014 CAF Champions League, where they lost to Enyimba F.C. of Nigeria 4–3 on aggregate in the first round.

The club was relegated to Second Division after the 2022–23 season.

== Achievements ==
- Togolese Championnat National
  - Champions (1): 2013
