= Foadan FC =

Association football club in Togo

- Full name: Foadan Football Club
- Founded: 1974
- Ground: Stade Municipal
- Capacity: 1,000
- Chairman: Mohamed Aminou
- Coach: Djabirou Issa
- League: Togolese Championnat National de 2ème Division
- 2025/26: N/A

Foadan Football Club is a Togolese football club based in Dapaong, a commercial city in the Northern Togo. The club was founded in 1974.

They play in the Togolese Championnat League 2. In 2023 the coach was Djabirou Issa.
