= OC Agaza =

Association football club in Togo

- Full name: Olympique Club Agaza Omnisports
- Ground: Stade Agoè-Nyivé, Lomé, Togo
- Capacity: 10,000
- League: Togolese Championnat National
- 2017/18: 15th ▼
Home colours	Away colours

OC Agaza is a Togolese football club based in Lomé. They play in the top division in Togolese football. Their home stadium is Stade Agoè-Nyivé.

== Achievements ==
- Togolese Championnat National: 2

1980, 1984

- Coupe du Togo: 5

1979, 1981, 1984, 1988, 1999

== Performance in CAF competitions ==
- African Cup of Champions Clubs: 2 appearances

1981: Second Round
1985: First Round

- CAF Cup: 1 appearance

1995 – Quarter-Finals

- CAF Cup Winners' Cup: 7 appearances

1980 – Quarter-Finals
1982 – First Round
1983 – Finalist
1984 – Second Round
1994 – Semi-Finals
1998 – First Round
2000 – First Round

== Former players ==
- (Togo) Jean-Paul Abalo
- (Togo) Emmanuel Adebayor
- (Togo) Komlan Amewou
- (Togo) Bachirou Salou
- (Togo) Tadjou Salou
