= AS OTR Lomé =

Togolese football club

- Full name: Association Sportive de l'Office Togolais des Recettes
- Founded: 1961, as Association Sportive des Douanes Togolaises
- Ground: Stade Municipal de Lomé
- Manager: Messan Ametokodo
- League: Togolese Championnat National
- 2025–26: Togolese Championnat National, 12th of 16
Home colours	Away colours

Association Sportive de l'Office Togolais des Recettes is a football club based in Lomé, Togo. They compete in the Togolese Championnat National, the top division in Togolese football. They were known as AS Douanes until September 2015.

In the 2024/25 season they placed fourth.

== Achievements ==
- Togolese Championnat National: 2

2002, 2005

- Coupe du Togo: 1

2004

== Performance in CAF competitions ==
- CAF Champions League: 2 appearances

2003 – First Round
2004 – Second Round

- CAF Confederation Cup: 2 appearances

2005 – First Round
2014 – First Round

== Current squad ==
Note: Flags indicate national team as defined under FIFA eligibility rules; some limited exceptions apply. Players may hold more than one non-FIFA nationality.

No.	Pos.	Nation	Player
1	GK	TOG	Sadate Essoazina Koukouté
2	DF	TOG	Adedze Kodjo
3	DF	TOG	Safiana Bagnon
4	FW	TOG	Dégli Messan
5	DF	TOG	Tawali Magnima
6	DF	TOG	Abdel Aziz Ouro-Agnoro
7	FW	TOG	Kpadenou Komlan
8	DF	TOG	Baem Bomda-Bagna
9	FW	TOG	Saïbou Badarou
10	FW	TOG	Kombé Edem
11	MF	TOG	Yao Tronou Attikpowun
12	DF	TOG	Zangaba Abasse
13	MF	TOG	Yacoubou Tofic Fousseni
14	MF	TOG	Moustapha Abdoul Waliou
15	FW	TOG	Abibou Mouhamadou

No.	Pos.	Nation	Player
16	GK	TOG	Esso Manzama
17	MF	TOG	Mani Ougadja
18	MF	TOG	Ali Baba Abass
19	FW	TOG	Kondo Arimiyao
20	MF	TOG	Tamekloe Apélété
21	MF	TOG	Sanvi Koffi
22	FW	TOG	Nouwoklo Kossivi Martin
23	MF	TOG	Djadja Ablami
24	GK	TOG	Agodo Assane
25	DF	TOG	Vivo Kossi
26	MF	TOG	Ibrahim Akpo-Idrissou
27	DF	TOG	Salami Rabiou
28	FW	TOG	Anasse Ouro-Gbélé
30	GK	TOG	Falabia Hezouwe
