= Maranatha FC =

Association football club in Togo

Maranatha F.C.
- Full name: Maranatha Football Club
- Founded: 1997
- Ground: Stade Général Ameyi, Womé, Togo
- Capacity: 5,000
- Chairman: (Togo) Gabriel Ameyi
- Manager: (Ghana) Herbert Addo
- League: Togolese Championnat National
- 2017/18: 8th
Home colours	Away colours

Maranatha F.C. is a Togolese football club based in Fiokpo. They play in the top division in Togolese football. Their home stadium is Stade Général Ameyi.
