= AC Semassi FC =

Football club in Togo

Semassi
- Full name: AC Semassi F.C.
- Ground: Stade Municipal, Sokodé, Togo
- Capacity: 10,000
- Chairman: Prince Agbey
- Manager: Auguste Gbagbo
- League: Togolese Championnat National
- 2025–26: 9th
Home colours	Away colours

AC Semassi F.C. is a Togolese professional football club based in Sokodé. They play in the top division in Togolese football. Their home stadium is Stade Municipal.

== History ==
Former Togo captain Emmanuel Adebayor last played for AC Semassi prior to his retirement in 2023.

== Achievements ==
- Togolese Championnat National: 10
  - 1978, 1979, 1981, 1982, 1983, 1993, 1994, 1995, 1999, 2014
- Coupe du Togo: 3
  - 1980, 1982, 1990

== Performance in CAF competitions ==
- African Cup of Champions Clubs: 7 appearances

1980: Second Round
1982: First Round
1983: First Round
1984: Semi-Finals
1994: First Round
1995: First Round
1996: First Round
2015: First Round

- CAF Cup: 1 appearance

2000 – First Round

- CAF Cup Winners' Cup: 3 appearances

1981 – Second Round
1991 – First Round
1993 – Second Round
