= AS Togo-Port =

Togolese football club

AC Barracuda
- Ground: Stade Agoè-Nyivé; Lomé, Togo
- Capacity: 2,000
- Chairman: (Togo) Boukpessi Essoyaba
- Manager: (Togo) Agoro Tchagodomou
- League: Togolese Championnat National
- 2025-26: 7th
| Home colours | Away colours |

AC Barracuda formerly known as Association Sportive Togo-Port is a Togolese football club based in Lomé. They play in the top division in Togolese football. Their home stadium is Stade Agoè-Nyivé.

== History ==
The club was founded in 1969 by employees of the Port of Togo. It played in the corporate league until 1994 when it joined the Third Division. Two years later they promoted to the Second Division. In 2002 they moved to the top division.

In 2005–07 Tiliwa Kidiba born the 11 October 1984 was AS Togo Port striker with 30 goals in 54 matches and has permitted AS Togo Port FC to win the championship 2006.

In 2023 the club changed their name to AC Barracuda.

== Achievements ==
- Togolese Championnat National: 1
  - Champions: 2017
- Coupe du Togo: 2
  - Winner: 2006, 2017
  - Runners-up: 2016
