= Gomido FC =

Togolese football club

Gomido
- Full name: Gomido Football Club
- Nicknames: Shows Boys, Ezo Bibi
- Founded: 1974
- Ground: Stade Municipal; Kpalimé, Togo
- Capacity: 10,000
- Chairman: Winny Dogbatse
- Manager: Ézé Tomedegbe
- League: Togolese Championnat National
- 2024-2025: 6th
Home colours	Away colours

Gomido Football Club is a Togolese football club based in Kpalimé. They play in the first division in Togolese football. Their home stadium is Stade Municipal.

They won the Togo Football Cup in 2018.

== Performance in CAF competitions ==
- CAF Cup: 1 appearance

1994 – First Round

- West African Club Championship (UFOA Cup): 1 appearance

2009 – Semi-finals (Host)
