= Dynamic Togolais =

Association football club in Togo

Dynamic Togolais Lome
- Full name: Dynamic Togolais
- Founded: 1940; 86 years ago
- Ground: Stade Agoè-Nyivé, Lomé, Togo
- Capacity: 2,000
- Chairman: Serge Adandé
- League: Togolese Championnat National
- 2025–26: 5th
Home colours	Away colours

Dynamic Togolais (also known as Dyto) is a Togolese football club based in Lomé.

== Stadium ==
They play at the Stade Agoè-Nyivé and sometimes use 30,000 capacity Stade de Kégué for games.

== Achievements ==
- Togolese Championnat National: 6

1970, 1971, 1997, 2001, 2004, 2012

- Coupe du Togo: 3

2001, 2002, 2005

== Performance in CAF competitions ==
- CAF Champions League: 2 appearances

1998 – First Round
2002 – Preliminary Round

- African Cup of Champions Clubs: 2 appearances

1971 – Quarter-Finals
1972 – Second Round

- CAF Confederation Cup: 3 appearances

2004 – Preliminary Round
2006 – Preliminary Round
2011 – Preliminary Round

- CAF Cup Winners' Cup: 1 appearance

2003 – First Round

== Current squad ==
as of 2013 Note: Flags indicate national team as defined under FIFA eligibility rules; some limited exceptions apply. Players may hold more than one non-FIFA nationality.

No.	Pos.	Nation	Player
1	GK	TOG	Blaise Agbodjan
2	DF	TOG	Abdel Agnoro Ouro
4	DF	TOG	Faisal Essoazina
5	MF	TOG	Edem Towodjo
6	DF	TOG	Alex Kinvi-Boh
7	MF	TOG	Bruce Vénance Akoueté
9	FW	TOG	Koffi Dosseh
10	MF	TOG	Kola Sanoussi
11	FW	TOG	Samari Moitapari
12	DF	TOG	Alemawo Sewavi
14	MF	TOG	Ali-Malouwa Moustapha

No.	Pos.	Nation	Player
15	MF	TOG	Dové Womé
16	GK	TOG	Safiou Salifou
17	MF	BEN	Wassiou Olade
19	FW	TOG	Agouda Tchagbele
21	DF	TOG	Arouna Zato
22	FW	NGA	Kassim Adépoju
24	DF	TOG	Jean Kossi
25	FW	TOG	Mohamede Mamadou
26	MF	TOG	Ayeva Fergani
27	GK	TOG	Djehani N'Guissan

== Notable players ==
(Benin)

- Thomas Djilan

(Ivory Coast)

- Zakari Cissé

(Nigeria)

- Lamidi Mikel Akinkunmi

(Togo)

- Messan Ametokodo
- Komlan Amewou
- Zaire Apaloo Anoumou
- Ayi Assiongbon
- Koffi Bossou
- Abbe Ibrahim
- Nsouhoho Mensah
- Adekanmi Olufade
