= 1997 in association football =

The following are the association football events of the year 1997 throughout the world.

== Events ==
- January 1 – Manager Leo Beenhakker is named technical director at Dutch club Vitesse Arnhem and replaced as manager by Sparta Rotterdam head coach Henk ten Cate.
- Roberto Carlos scored his famous 'banana shot' free kick against France in 1997 Tournoi de France
- Copa Libertadores 1997: is won by Cruzeiro after defeating Sporting Cristal on an aggregate score of 1–0.
- UEFA Champions League: Borussia Dortmund won 3–1 in final against Juventus in the Olympiastadion. The goals for the Germans were scored by Riedle in the 29th and 34th minute and Ricken in the 71st minute.
- Scottish Cup: Kilmarnock FC beat Falkirk 1–0.
- February 25 – Manager Hans Westerhof is sacked by FC Groningen.
- April 30 – Striker Boudewijn Zenden from PSV Eindhoven plays his first international match for the Netherlands national football team, when Holland defeats San Marino 6–0 in Serravalle.
- May 17 – Chelsea wins the FA Cup by defeating Middlesbrough 2–0.
- May 18 – Eric Cantona, the famous and controversial French footballer in the Premiership, announces his retirement from football.
- June 29 – Brazil wins the 1997 Copa América by defeating home nation Bolivia 3–1 in the final in the Estadio Hernando Siles in La Paz.
- July 20 – Gudjon Thordarson makes his debut as the manager of Iceland with a 1–0 loss against Norway.
- August 17 – PSV Eindhoven wins the Johan Cruijff Schaal, the annual opening of the new season in the Eredivisie, with a 3–1 win over Roda JC in the Amsterdam ArenA.
- November 2 – Borussia Dortmund wins the Intercontinental Cup in Tokyo, Japan by defeating Brazil's Cruzeiro 2–0. The goals for the Germans are scored by Michael Zorc and Heiko Herrlich.

== Winner national club championships ==
=== Asia ===
- Japan - Júbilo Iwata
- Lebanon – Al-Ansar
- Qatar – Al-Arabi
- South Korea - Pusan Daewoo Royals
- Thailand - Bangkok Bank, Royal Thai Air Force

=== Europe ===
- Bulgaria – CSKA Sofia
- Croatia – Croatia Zagreb
- England – Manchester United
- France – AS Monaco
- Germany – Bayern Munich
- Greece – Olympiacos
- Italy – Juventus
- Netherlands – PSV Eindhoven
- Norway – Rosenborg
- Poland – Widzew Łódź
- Portugal – Porto
- Scotland – Rangers
- Spain – Real Madrid
- Turkey – Galatasaray
- FR Yugoslavia – Partizan

=== North America ===
- Mexico
  - Verano – Chivas
  - Invierno – Cruz Azul
- United States – D.C. United (MLS)

=== South America ===
- Argentina
  - Clausura – River Plate
  - Apertura – River Plate
- Bolivia – Bolívar
- Brazil – Vasco da Gama
- Chile
  - Apertura – Universidad Católica
  - Clausura – Colo-Colo
- Paraguay – Olimpia Asunción
- Peru – Alianza Lima

== International tournaments ==
- UNCAF Nations Cup in Guatemala City, Guatemala (April 16–27, 1997)
  1. Costa Rica
  2. Guatemala
  3. El Salvador
- Copa América in Bolivia (June 11–29, 1997)
  1. Brazil
  2. Bolivia
  3. Mexico
- Baltic Cup in Vilnius, Lithuania (July 9–11, 1997)
  1. Lithuania
  2. Latvia
  3. Estonia
- FIFA U-20 World Cup in Malaysia (June 16 – July 5, 1997)
  1. Argentina
  2. Uruguay
  3. Republic of Ireland
- FIFA U-17 World Championship in Egypt (September 5–21, 1997)
  1. Brazil
  2. Ghana
  3. Spain
- Tournoi de France in France (June 3–11, 1997)
  1. England
  2. Brazil
  3. France

== Births ==
- January 1
  - Hamidou Bojang, Gambian international footballer
  - Quique Fornos, Spanish footballer
- January 5 – Jesús Vallejo, Spanish footballer
- January 7 – Izzy Brown, English footballer
- January 8 – Fran Brodić, Croatian footballer
- January 13 – Luis Díaz, Colombian footballer
- January 16 – Pau Torres, Spanish footballer
- January 26 – Gedion Zelalem, American soccer player
- January 31 – Arnaut Danjuma, Dutch footballer
- February 3 – Lewis Cook, English footballer
- February 10 – Adam Armstrong, English footballer
- February 26 – Malcom, Brazilian footballer
- March 3
  - Elia Alessandrini, Swiss footballer (d. 2022)
  - Jaime Carreño, Chilean footballer
- March 6 – Daniel De Silva, Australian youth international
- March 7 – Laurent Lopes, French Guianan footballer
- March 12
  - Dean Henderson, English footballer
  - Allan Saint-Maximin, French footballer
- March 29 – Ezequiel Ponce, Argentine footballer
- April 2 – Abdelhak Nouri, Dutch footballer
- April 5 – Borja Mayoral, Spanish footballer
- April 13 – Mateo Cassierra, Colombian footballer
- April 17 – Jorge Meré, Spanish footballer
- April 18 – Donny van de Beek, Dutch footballer
- April 21 – Henrique Brito, Portuguese footballer
- April 22 – Jill Roord, Dutch footballer
- April 27 – Josh Onomah, English footballer
- May 7 – Orlande Kpassa, Ivorian footballer
- May 12
  - Connor Ellis, English footballer
  - Frenkie de Jong, Dutch footballer
- May 14 – Rúben Dias, Portuguese footballer
- May 17 – Andrea Favilli, Italian footballer
- June 16 – Jean-Kévin Augustin, French footballer
- June 22 – Gabriel Rojas, Argentine footballer
- July 2 – Charles (José Charles Soares Matos), Brazilian footballer
- July 3 – Filip Sachpekidis, Swedish footballer
- July 4 – Juan Izquierdo, Uruguayan footballer (d. 2024)
- July 11 – Rasmus Kristensen, Danish footballer
- July 14 – Cengiz Ünder, Turkish footballer
- July 17 – Amadou Diawara, Guinean footballer
- July 23 – Matija Sarkic, English-born Montenegrin footballer (d. 2024)
- July 25 – Louis Reed, English footballer
- August 2 – Ivan Šaponjić, Serbian footballer
- August 3
  - Daniel Crowley, English youth international
  - Adrian Lillebekk Ovlien, Norwegian footballer (d. 2018)
- August 4 – Cinzia Zehnder, Swiss footballer
- August 6
  - Rick Sena, Brazilian footballer
  - Sander Svendsen, Norwegian youth international
- August 9 – Leon Bailey, Jamaican international
- August 12 – Taiwo Awoniyi, Nigerian footballer
- August 19 – Bartłomiej Drągowski, Polish footballer
- August 22 – Lautaro Martínez, Argentine footballer
- August 29 – Ainsley Maitland-Niles, English footballer
- September 15 – Jeisson Vargas, Chilean footballer
- September 16 – Zsanett Kaján, Hungarian women's international
- September 23 – Luis Corredor, Venezuelan footballer
- October 2 – Tammy Abraham, English international
- October 6 – Kasper Dolberg, Danish international
- October 9 - Samuel Leach Holm, Swedish-Israeli footballer
- October 17 – Václav Černý, Czech footballer
- October 22 – Jodi Jones, Maltese footballer
- October 24 – Fabian (Fabian Maria Lago Vilela de Abreu), Brazilian footballer
- October 26 – Fortuné Oré, Beninese footballer
- November 1 – Nordi Mukiele, French footballer
- November 5 – Abdoulie Bah, Gambian footballer
- November 14 – Christopher Nkunku, French footballer
- November 18
  - Olivier Boscagli, French footballer
  - Robert Sánchez, Spanish footballer
- November 25 – Mohamed Amelhaf, French footballer
- November 26 – Aaron Wan-Bissaka, English footballer
- December 7 – Abi Harrison, Scottish footballer
- December 11 – Konstantinos Mavropanos, Greek footballer
- December 18 – Joan Monterde, Spanish footballer
- December 22 – Devaughn Williamson, Bahamian footballer

== Deaths ==
=== January ===
- January 10 – Francisco Aramburu, Brazilian striker, runner-up at the 1950 FIFA World Cup. (75)

=== February ===
- February 19 – Afonso Guimarães da Silva, Brazilian midfielder, semi-finalist at the 1938 FIFA World Cup. (82)
- February 21 – Josef Posipal, West-German defender, winner of the 1954 FIFA World Cup. (69, heart failure)

=== March ===
- March 25 – Baltazar, Brazilian striker, runner-up at the 1950 FIFA World Cup. (71)

=== April ===
- April 23 – Brian Alderson (46), Scottish footballer

=== June ===
- June 4 – Pedro Zaballa (58), Spanish footballer
- June 18 – Héctor Yazalde (51), Argentinian footballer

=== July ===
- July 8 – Dick van Dijk (51), Dutch footballer
- July 10 – Ivor Allchurch (67), Welsh footballer

=== September ===
- September 21 – Juan Burgueño, Uruguayan forward, winner of the 1950 FIFA World Cup. (91)
- September 29 – Dequinha, Brazilian midfielder, Brazilian squad member at the 1954 FIFA World Cup. (69)

=== October ===
- October 18 – Ramiro Castillo (31), Bolivian footballer
- October 31 – Bram Appel (76), Dutch footballer
- October 31 – Hans Bauer, West-German defender, winner of the 1954 FIFA World Cup. (70)

=== November ===
- November 1 – Roger Marche (73), French footballer
- November 9 – Helenio Herrera (80), Argentine-French footballer and manager

=== December ===
- December 7 – Billy Bremner (54), Scottish footballer
- December 28 – William Martínez, Uruguayan midfielder, winner of the 1950 FIFA World Cup. (69)
