= Abdoulie Bah =

Abdoulie Bah may refer to:

- Abdoulie Bah (footballer)
- Abdoulie Bah (politician)
