= List of most expensive association football transfers =

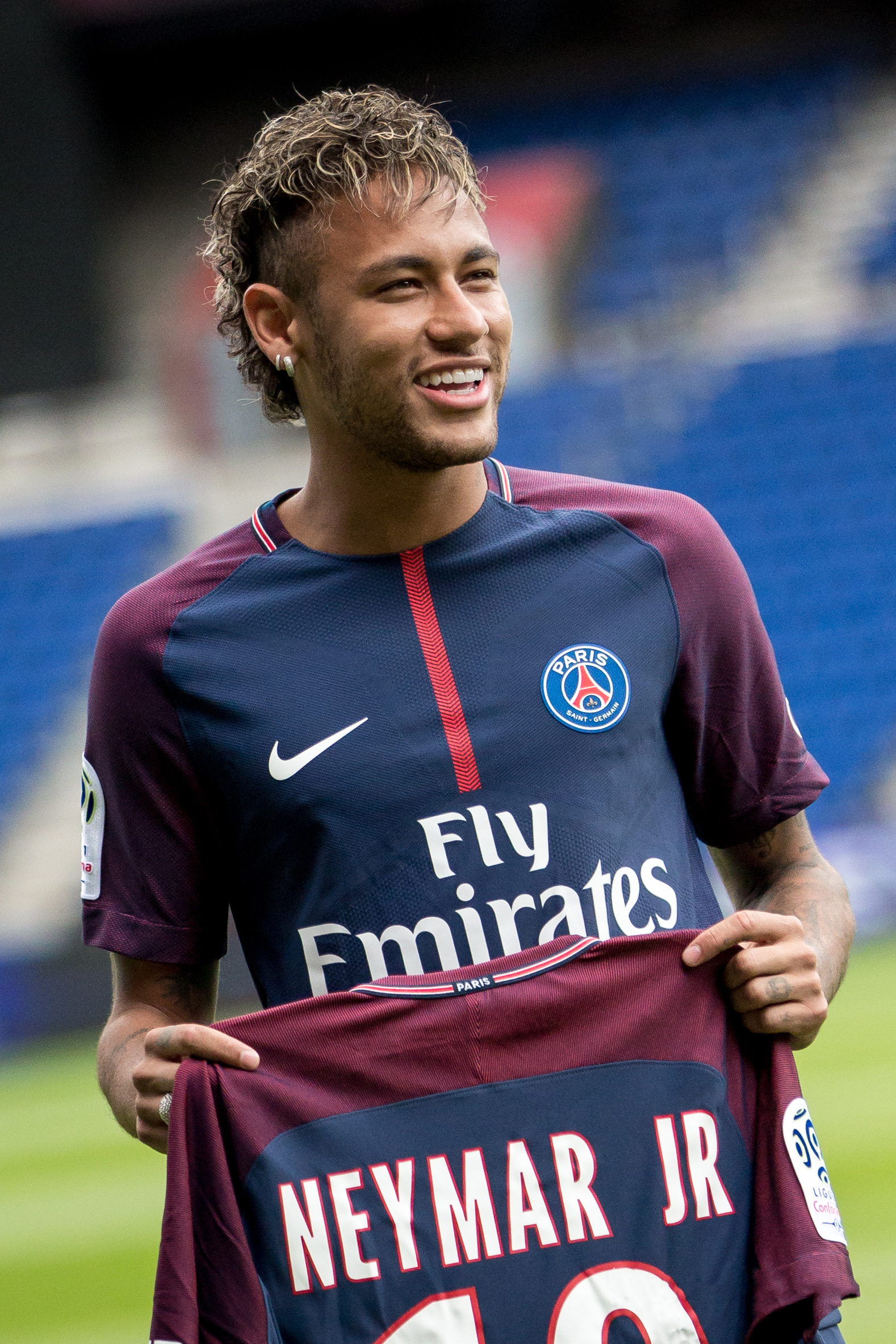
Neymar, who completed the most expensive transfer ever

The following is a list of most expensive association football transfers, which details the highest transfer fees ever paid for players and managers, as well as transfers which set new world transfer records. The first confirmed record transfer was of Willie Groves from West Bromwich Albion to Aston Villa for £100 in 1893 (equivalent to £11,000 in 2025), made just eight years after the introduction of professionalism by the Football Association in 1885.

The current transfer record was set by the transfer of Neymar from Barcelona to Paris Saint-Germain for €222 million (£200 million) in August 2017, while the current record for women was set by the transfer of Grace Geyoro from Paris Saint-Germain to London City Lionesses for €1.65 million (£1.43 million) in September 2025.

== Highest transfer records in association football ==
The majority of transfers on the list involve clubs from the Big Five leagues, with Premier League clubs accounting for half of all player sales and purchases. Saudi Arabian clubs are the only non-Big Five purchasing clubs on the list, while the non-Big Five selling clubs include Ajax and Benfica. Overall, Real Madrid made the list eight times for player purchases, the most among all clubs.

Half of the transfers on the list reached €100 million. Romelu Lukaku appears on this list three times for moves to Manchester United, Inter Milan, and Chelsea. Enzo Fernández, Cristiano Ronaldo and Neymar appear on the list twice. All of the players on the list are of European (UEFA), South American (CONMEBOL) or African (CAF) origin. There are currently no players from the remaining regions; North America (CONCACAF), Asia (AFC) and Oceania (OFC). Ten French players have made their name on the list, the most among all countries.

Most transfer fees listed are not officially disclosed by the trading clubs and are reported by reliable mainstream media. Different media outlets may report varying transfer fees. The transfer fees are ranked in Euro (€) and based on the exchange rate at the time of the transfer.

As of 1 September 2026

World record fee at the time of the transfer
Record fee for a teenager at the time of the transfer
Record fee of the respective league at the time of the transfer
Record fee for a South American player at the time of the transfer
Record fee for an African player at the time of the transfer
Record fee for a goalkeeper at the time of the transfer
Record fee for a defender at the time of the transfer

Top 50 most expensive association football transfers
Rank	Player	From	To	Position	Fee (€ million)	Fee (£ million)	Year	Ref.
1	(Brazil) Neymar (1)	(Spain) Barcelona	(France) Paris Saint-Germain	Forward	222 (Note: The player's buyout clause was activated in the transfer)	200	2017	
2	(France) Kylian Mbappé	(France) Monaco	(France) Paris Saint-Germain	Forward	180	165.7	2017	
3	(Argentina) Enzo Fernández (2)	(England) Chelsea	(England) Manchester City	Midfielder	145.8	125	2026	
4	(Sweden) Alexander Isak	(England) Newcastle United	(England) Liverpool	Forward	144.5	125 (Note: Initial £125 million plus £5 million in possible add-ons)	2025	
5	(England) Morgan Rogers	(England) Aston Villa	(England) Chelsea	Midfielder	137.3	117	2026	
6	(England) Elliot Anderson	(England) Nottingham Forest	(England) Manchester City	Midfielder	135.5	116	2026	
7	(Portugal) João Félix	(Portugal) Benfica	(Spain) Atlético Madrid	Forward	126	113	2019	
8	(Ivory Coast) Yan Diomande	(Germany) RB Leipzig	(Spain) Real Madrid	Forward	125 (Note: Initial €125 million plus €15 million in possible add-ons)	107	2026	
8	(France) Bradley Barcola	(France) Paris Saint-Germain	(England) Liverpool	Forward	125 (Note: Initial €125 million plus €20 million in possible add-ons)	106	2026	
10	(Argentina) Enzo Fernández (1)	(Portugal) Benfica	(England) Chelsea	Midfielder	121	106.8	2023	
11	(France) Antoine Griezmann	(Spain) Atlético Madrid	(Spain) Barcelona	Forward	120	107	2019	
12	(Brazil) Philippe Coutinho	(England) Liverpool	(Spain) Barcelona	Midfielder	118.4	105 (Note: Initial £105 million plus £37 million in possible add-ons)	2018	
13	(England) Jack Grealish	(England) Aston Villa	(England) Manchester City	Midfielder	117.7	100	2021	
14	(Germany) Florian Wirtz	(Germany) Bayer Leverkusen	(England) Liverpool	Midfielder	117.5	100 (Note: Initial £100 million plus £16 million in possible add-ons)	2025	
15	(England) Declan Rice	(England) West Ham United	(England) Arsenal	Midfielder	116.5	100 (Note: Initial £100 million plus £5 million in possible add-ons)	2023	
16	(Ecuador) Moisés Caicedo	(England) Brighton & Hove Albion	(England) Chelsea	Midfielder	116.3	100 (Note: Initial £100 million plus £15 million in possible add-ons)	2023	
17	(Belgium) Romelu Lukaku (3)	(Italy) Inter Milan	(England) Chelsea	Forward	115	97.5	2021	
18	(Italy) Sandro Tonali	(England) Newcastle United	(England) Tottenham Hotspur	Midfielder	108.1	92.5 (Note: Initial £92.5 million plus £7.5 million in possible add-ons)	2026	
19	(France) Ousmane Dembélé	(Germany) Borussia Dortmund	(Spain) Barcelona	Forward	105 (Note: Initial €105 million plus €40 million in possible add-ons)	96.8	2017	
19	(France) Paul Pogba	(Italy) Juventus	(England) Manchester United	Midfielder	105 (Note: Initial €105 million plus €5 million in possible add-ons)	89.3	2016	
21	(England) Jude Bellingham	(Germany) Borussia Dortmund	(Spain) Real Madrid	Midfielder	103 (Note: Initial €103 million plus €30.9 million in possible add-ons)	88.5	2023	
22	(Belgium) Eden Hazard	(England) Chelsea	(Spain) Real Madrid	Forward	100	89 (Note: Initial £89 million plus £60 million in possible add-ons)	2019	
22	(Portugal) Cristiano Ronaldo (2)	(Spain) Real Madrid	(Italy) Juventus	Forward	100	88.3	2018	
22	(England) Harry Kane	(England) Tottenham Hotspur	(Germany) Bayern Munich	Forward	100 (Note: Initial €100 million plus €10 million in possible add-ons)	86.4	2023	
22	(Wales) Gareth Bale	(England) Tottenham Hotspur	(Spain) Real Madrid	Forward	100	85.3	2013	
26	(Portugal) Mateus Fernandes	(England) West Ham United	(England) Tottenham Hotspur	Midfielder	99.3	85	2026	
27	(Morocco) Ayyoub Bouaddi	(France) Lille	(England) Manchester City	Midfielder	95 (Note: Initial €95 million plus €5 million in possible add-ons)	81.4	2026	
27	(Brazil) Antony	(Netherlands) Ajax	(England) Manchester United	Forward	95 (Note: Initial €95 million plus €5 million in possible add-ons)	81.3	2022	
29	(Portugal) Cristiano Ronaldo (1)	(England) Manchester United	(Spain) Real Madrid	Forward	94	80	2009	
30	(Brazil) Neymar (2)	(France) Paris Saint-Germain	(Saudi Arabia) Al-Hilal	Forward	90	77.6	2023	
30	(Croatia) Joško Gvardiol	(Germany) RB Leipzig	(England) Manchester City	Defender	90	77	2023	
30	(Argentina) Gonzalo Higuaín	(Italy) Napoli	(Italy) Juventus	Forward	90	75.3	2016	
33	(Brazil) Sávio	(England) Manchester City	(England) Tottenham Hotspur	Forward	87.7	75 (Note: Initial £75 million plus £10 million in possible add-ons)	2026	
34	(Brazil) Bruno Guimarães	(England) Newcastle United	(England) Arsenal	Midfielder	87.5	75	2026	
35	(England) Harry Maguire	(England) Leicester City	(England) Manchester United	Defender	86.6	80	2019	
36	(England) Jadon Sancho	(Germany) Borussia Dortmund	(England) Manchester United	Midfielder	85	73 (Note: Initial £73 million plus £5 million in possible add-ons)	2021	
37	(Belgium) Romelu Lukaku (1)	(England) Everton	(England) Manchester United	Forward	84.8	75 (Note: Initial £75 million plus £15 million in possible add-ons)	2017	
38	(Netherlands) Virgil van Dijk	(England) Southampton	(England) Liverpool	Defender	84.4	75	2018	
39	(Uruguay) Luis Suárez	(England) Liverpool	(Spain) Barcelona	Forward	82.3	65	2014	
40	(France) Wesley Fofana	(England) Leicester City	(England) Chelsea	Defender	80.9	70 (Note: Initial £70 million plus £5 million in possible add-ons)	2022	
41	(Belgium) Romelu Lukaku (2)	(England) Manchester United	(Italy) Inter Milan	Forward	80	74	2019	
41	(Ivory Coast) Nicolas Pépé	(France) Lille	(England) Arsenal	Midfielder	80	72	2019	
41	(Spain) Kepa Arrizabalaga	(Spain) Athletic Bilbao	(England) Chelsea	Goalkeeper	80	71.6	2018	
41	(France) Hugo Ekitike	(Germany) Eintracht Frankfurt	(England) Liverpool	Forward	80	69 (Note: Initial £69 million plus £10 million in possible add-ons)	2025	
41	(France) Aurélien Tchouaméni	(France) Monaco	(Spain) Real Madrid	Midfielder	80 (Note: Initial €80 million plus €20 million in possible add-ons)	68.3	2022	
41	(France) Lucas Hernandez	(Spain) Atlético Madrid	(Germany) Bayern Munich	Defender	80	68	2019	
41	(Colombia) James Rodríguez	(France) Monaco	(Spain) Real Madrid	Midfielder	80	63	2014	
48	(France) Zinedine Zidane	(Italy) Juventus	(Spain) Real Madrid	Midfielder	77.5	46.2	2001	
49	(Colombia) Jhon Durán	(England) Aston Villa	(Saudi Arabia) Al-Nassr	Forward	77	64.5 (Note: Initial £64.5 million plus £6.5 million in possible add-ons)	2025	
50	(Slovenia) Benjamin Šeško	(Germany) RB Leipzig	(England) Manchester United	Forward	76.5 (Note: Initial €76.5 million plus €8.5 million in possible add-ons)	66.3	2025	

=== Statistics ===
Country	Players	Selling clubs	Purchasing clubs
France	10	7	2
England	8	23	28
Belgium	4	0	0
Brazil	6	0	0
Argentina	3	0	0
Germany	1	8	2
Netherlands	1	1	0
Portugal	4	2	0
Colombia	2	0	0
Ivory Coast	2	0	0
Uruguay	1	0	0
Spain	1	5	13
Italy	1	4	3
Croatia	1	0	0
Ecuador	1	0	0
Morocco	1	0	0
Slovenia	1	0	0
Sweden	1	0	0
Wales	1	0	0
Saudi Arabia	0	0	2

=== Most expensive player by confederation ===
Confederation	Player	From	To	Position	Fee (€ million)	Fee (£ million)	Year	Ref.
CONMEBOL	(Brazil) Neymar	(Spain) Barcelona	(France) Paris Saint-Germain	Forward	222 (Note: The player's buyout clause was activated in the transfer)	200	2017	
UEFA	(France) Kylian Mbappé	(France) Monaco	(France) Paris Saint-Germain	Forward	180	165.7	2018	
CAF	(Ivory Coast) Yan Diomande	(Germany) RB Leipzig	(Spain) Real Madrid	Forward	125 (Note: Initial €125 million plus €15 million in possible add-ons)	107	2026	
CONCACAF	(United States) Christian Pulisic	(Germany) Borussia Dortmund	(England) Chelsea	Midfielder	64	57.6	2019	
AFC	(South Korea) Kim Min-jae	(Italy) Napoli	(Germany) Bayern Munich	Defender	50	43	2023	
OFC	(New Zealand) Chris Wood	(England) Burnley	(England) Newcastle United	Forward	30	25	2022	

== World football transfer record ==
The first player to ever be transferred for a fee of over £100 was Scottish striker Willie Groves when he together with Jack Reynolds (£50) made the switch from West Bromwich Albion to Aston Villa in 1893, eight years after the legalisation of professionalism in the sport. It took just another twelve years for the figure to become £1,000, when Sunderland striker Alf Common moved to Middlesbrough. It was not until 1928 that the first five-figure transfer took place. David Jack of Bolton Wanderers was the subject of interest from Arsenal, and in order to negotiate the fee down, Arsenal manager Herbert Chapman got the Bolton representatives drunk. Subsequently, David Jack was transferred for a world record fee when Arsenal paid £10,890 to Bolton for his services, after Bolton had asked for £13,000, which was double the previous record made when Sunderland signed Burnley's Bob Kelly for a fee of £6,500.

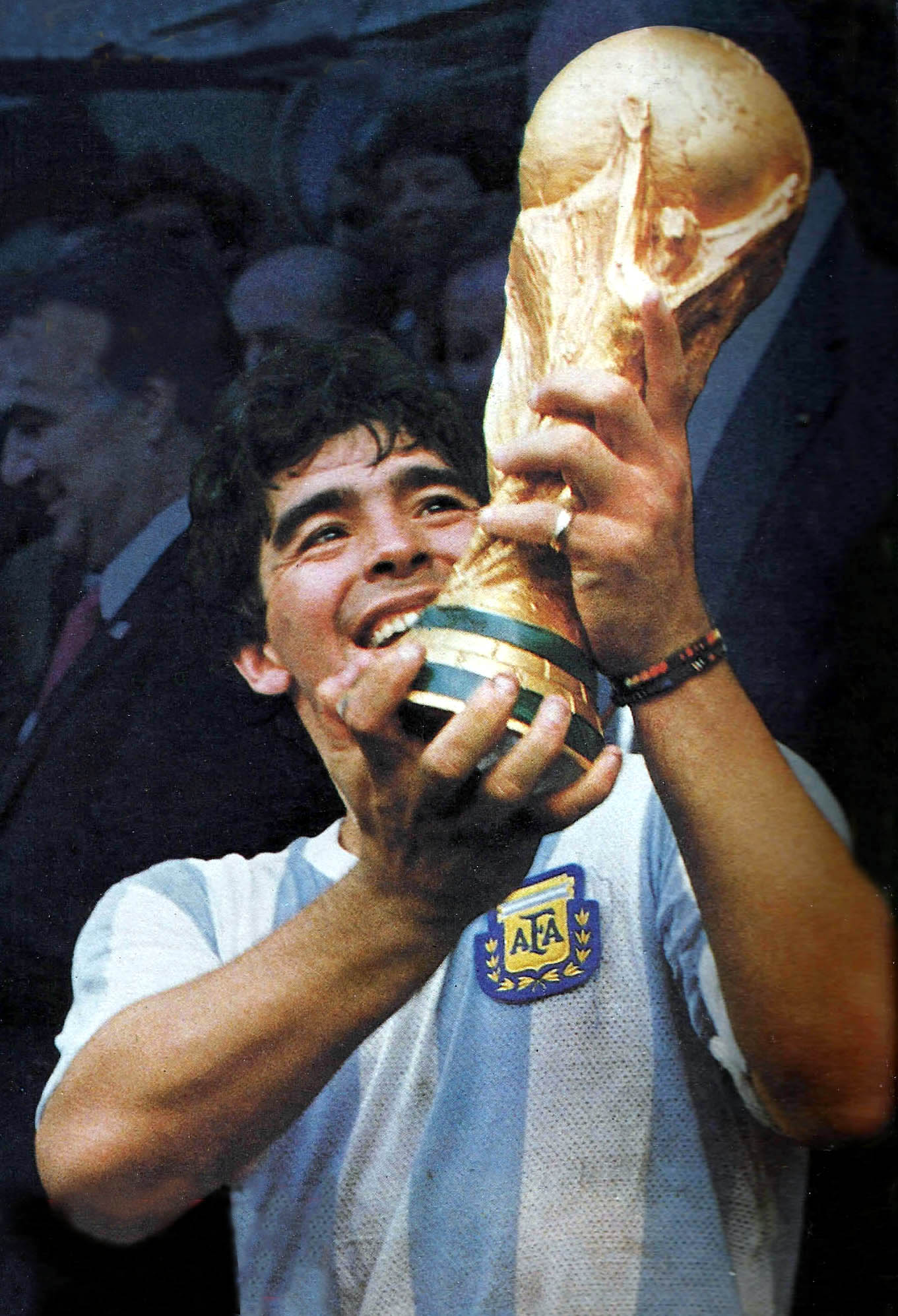
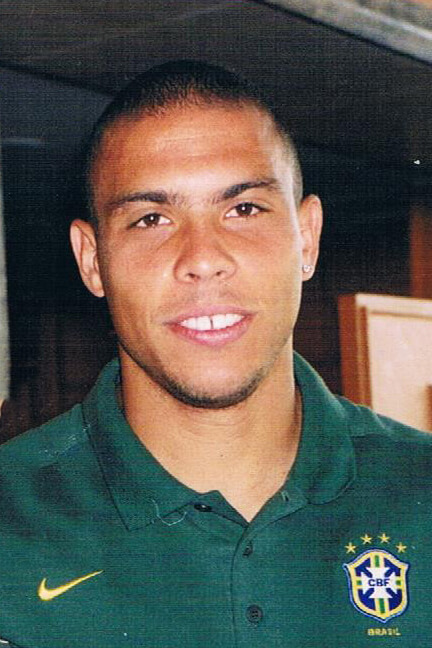
Diego Maradona and Ronaldo (pictured) were twice transferred for world record fees.

The first player from outside Great Britain to break the record was Bernabé Ferreyra, a player known as La Fiera for his powerful shot. His 1932 transfer from Tigre to River Plate cost £23k, and the record would last for 17 years (the longest the record has lasted) until it was broken by Manchester United's sale of Johnny Morris to Derby County for £24k in March 1949. The record was broken seven further times between 1949 and 1961, when Luis Suárez Miramontes was sold by Barcelona to Inter Milan for £152k, becoming the first ever player sold for more than £100k. In 1968, Pietro Anastasi became the first £500k player when Juventus purchased him from Varese, which was followed seven years later with Giuseppe Savoldi becoming the first million pound player when he transferred from Bologna to Napoli.

After Alf Common and David Jack, the third player to twice be transferred for world record fees is Diego Maradona. His transfers from Boca Juniors to Barcelona for £3m, and then to Napoli for £5m, both broke the record in 1982 and 1984 respectively. In the space of 61 days in 1992, three transfers broke the record, all by Italian clubs: Jean-Pierre Papin transferred from Marseille to A.C. Milan, becoming the first ever £10m player. Almost immediately, rivals Juventus topped that with the signing of Gianluca Vialli for a fee of £12m from Sampdoria. Milan then completed the signing of Gianluigi Lentini for a fee of £13m which stood as the record for three years.

The 1996 transfer of Alan Shearer from Blackburn Rovers to Newcastle United, for a fee of £15m, kickstarted a year-by-year succession of record breaking transfers: Ronaldo moved the following year to Inter Milan from Barcelona for a fee of £17m, which was followed in 1998 by the shock transfer of his fellow countryman Denílson from São Paulo to Real Betis for a fee of approximately £21m. In 1999 and 2000, Italian clubs returned to their record-breaking ways, with Christian Vieri transferring from Lazio to Inter Milan for £28m, while Hernán Crespo's transfer from Parma to Lazio ensured he became the first player to cost more than £30m. The transfer prompted the BBC to ask "has the world gone mad"? It took two weeks for the record to be broken when Luís Figo made a controversial £37m move from Barcelona to rivals Real Madrid. A year later, Real increased the record again with a signing of Zinedine Zidane for £48m.

Zidane's record stood for 8 years, the longest since the 1940s. Real Madrid continued with the Galácticos policy by buying Kaká from Milan for €67m (£56m), which was the world record in pound sterling. However, both world record in euro and in pound sterling were broken by Real themselves when signing Cristiano Ronaldo for £80m (€94m) from Manchester United in the same transfer window, Four years later Real Madrid broke the record again after completed the signing of Gareth Bale from Tottenham Hotspur in 2013. Although Real initially insisted that the transfer cost €91.59m, slightly less than the Ronaldo fee, the deal was widely reported to be around €100m (around £85.1m). Documents leaked in 2016 by Football Leaks revealed that instalments brought the final Bale fee up to a total of €100,759,418. In 2016, Manchester United eventually took the record away from Real Madrid, signing French midfielder Paul Pogba for €105m (£89m), four years after having released him to Juventus for training compensation.

A year after the Pogba transfer, however, there was a major jump in the record fee. Paris Saint-Germain matched the €222m buyout fee of Barcelona's Neymar, converted to a reported £198m by different sources, or £200m more than double the previous record. This was the first time that the record fee was paid by a French club.

Overall, the majority of these record-breaking transfers have involved clubs under UEFA’s jurisdiction. England leads across all categories—producing the most record-breaking players, while its clubs have set the record the most times for both sales and purchases. Barcelona has broken the record for the highest transfer fee received five times, while Real Madrid and Inter Milan have broken the record for the highest transfer fee paid for a player five times.

=== Historical progression ===
The transfer fees fluctuate due to exchange rate variations and are based on the exchange rate at the time of the transfer.

Year	Player	From	To	Fee (£)
1893	(Scotland) Willie Groves	(England) West Bromwich Albion	(England) Aston Villa	100
1896	(England) Fred Wheldon	(England) Small Heath	(England) Aston Villa	350–500
1903	(England) Ben Green	(England) Barnsley	(England) Small Heath	500
1904	(England) Alf Common (1)	(England) Sheffield United	(England) Sunderland	520
1904	(Scotland) Andy McCombie	(England) Sunderland	(England) Newcastle United	700
1905	(England) Alf Common (2)	(England) Sunderland	(England) Middlesbrough	1,000
1913	(England) Daniel Shea	(England) West Ham United	(England) Blackburn Rovers	2,000
1913	(England) Tommy Barber	(England) Bolton Wanderers	(England) Aston Villa	2,000
1914	(England) Percy Dawson	(Scotland) Heart of Midlothian	(England) Blackburn Rovers	2,500
1920	(England) David Jack (1)	(England) Plymouth Argyle	(England) Bolton Wanderers	3,500
1921	(Scotland) Tom Hamilton	(Scotland) Kilmarnock	(England) Preston North End	4,600
1922	(England) Syd Puddefoot	(England) West Ham United	(Scotland) Falkirk	5,000
1922	(England) Warney Cresswell	(England) South Shields	(England) Sunderland	5,500
1925	(England) Bob Kelly	(England) Burnley	(England) Sunderland	6,500
1928	(England) David Jack (2)	(England) Bolton Wanderers	(England) Arsenal	10,890
1932	(Argentina) Bernabé Ferreyra	(Argentina) Tigre	(Argentina) River Plate	23,000
1949	(England) Johnny Morris	(England) Manchester United	(England) Derby County	24,000
1949	(England) Eddie Quigley	(England) Sheffield Wednesday	(England) Preston North End	26,500
1950	(Wales) Trevor Ford	(England) Aston Villa	(England) Sunderland	30,000
1951	(England) Jackie Sewell	(England) Notts County	(England) Sheffield Wednesday	34,500
1952	(Sweden) Hans Jeppson	(Italy) Atalanta	(Italy) Napoli	52,000
1954	(Uruguay) Juan Schiaffino	(Uruguay) Peñarol	(Italy) Milan	72,000
1957	(Argentina) Omar Sivori	(Argentina) River Plate	(Italy) Juventus	93,000
1961	(Spain) Luis Suárez	(Spain) Barcelona	(Italy) Inter Milan	152,000
1963	(Italy) Angelo Sormani	(Italy) Mantova	(Italy) Roma	250,000
1967	(Denmark) Harald Nielsen	(Italy) Bologna	(Italy) Inter Milan	300,000
1968	(Italy) Pietro Anastasi	(Italy) Varese	(Italy) Juventus	500,000
1973	(Netherlands) Johan Cruyff	(Netherlands) Ajax	(Spain) Barcelona	922,000
1975	(Italy) Giuseppe Savoldi	(Italy) Bologna	(Italy) Napoli	1,200,000
1976	(Italy) Paolo Rossi	(Italy) Juventus	(Italy) Vicenza	1,750,000
1982	(Argentina) Diego Maradona (1)	(Argentina) Boca Juniors	(Spain) Barcelona	3,000,000
1984	(Argentina) Diego Maradona (2)	(Spain) Barcelona	(Italy) Napoli	5,000,000
1987	(Netherlands) Ruud Gullit	(Netherlands) PSV Eindhoven	(Italy) Milan	6,000,000
1987	(Belgium) Enzo Scifo	(Belgium) Anderlecht	(Italy) Inter Milan	7,600,000
1990	(Italy) Roberto Baggio	(Italy) Fiorentina	(Italy) Juventus	8,000,000
1992	(France) Jean-Pierre Papin	(France) Marseille	(Italy) Milan	10,000,000
1992	(Italy) Gianluca Vialli	(Italy) Sampdoria	(Italy) Juventus	12,000,000
1992	(Italy) Gianluigi Lentini	(Italy) Torino	(Italy) Milan	13,000,000
1996	(Brazil) Ronaldo (1)	(Netherlands) PSV Eindhoven	(Spain) Barcelona	13,200,000
1996	(England) Alan Shearer	(England) Blackburn Rovers	(England) Newcastle United	15,000,000
1997	(Brazil) Ronaldo (2)	(Spain) Barcelona	(Italy) Inter Milan	19,500,000
1998	(Brazil) Denílson	(Brazil) São Paulo	(Spain) Real Betis	21,500,000
1999	(Italy) Christian Vieri	(Italy) Lazio	(Italy) Inter Milan	32,000,000
2000	(Argentina) Hernán Crespo	(Italy) Parma	(Italy) Lazio	35,500,000
2000	(Portugal) Luís Figo	(Spain) Barcelona	(Spain) Real Madrid	37,000,000
2001	(France) Zinedine Zidane	(Italy) Juventus	(Spain) Real Madrid	46,600,000
2009	(Brazil) Kaká	(Italy) Milan	(Spain) Real Madrid	56,000,000
2009	(Portugal) Cristiano Ronaldo	(England) Manchester United	(Spain) Real Madrid	80,000,000
2013	(Wales) Gareth Bale	(England) Tottenham Hotspur	(Spain) Real Madrid	86,000,000
2016	(France) Paul Pogba	(Italy) Juventus	(England) Manchester United	89,000,000
2017	(Brazil) Neymar	(Spain) Barcelona	(France) Paris Saint-Germain	200,000,000

=== Number of record players by country ===
Country	Player records	Record selling	Record buying
England	16	20	20
Italy	8	14	19
Argentina	5	3	1
Brazil	5	1	0
France	3	1	1
Scotland	3	2	1
Netherlands	2	3	0
Wales	2	0	0
Portugal	2	0	0
Spain	1	5	9
Belgium	1	1	0
Uruguay	1	1	0
Denmark	1	0	0
Sweden	1	0	0

== Managers ==
While players are often purchased for high fees, the fee to release a manager from their contract is a lot less. Usually described as a "compensation fee", the amount paid to the manager's current club is based around several factors including the total salary for the current length of his contract, as well as potential bonuses and sponsorship deals, and additional fees if the club also need to pay compensation to hire a new manager.

The transfer fees fluctuate due to exchange rate variations and are based on the exchange rate at the time of the transfer.

Rank	Manager	From	To	Transfer fee		Year	Ref.
Rank	Manager	From	To	€ million	£ million	Year	Ref.
1	(Germany) Julian Nagelsmann	(Germany) RB Leipzig	(Germany) Bayern Munich	25	21.7	2021	
2	(England) Graham Potter	(England) Brighton & Hove Albion	(England) Chelsea	23	20	2022	
3	(Italy) Enzo Maresca (2)	(England) Chelsea	(England) Manchester City	19.7	17	2026	
4	(Portugal) André Villas-Boas	(Portugal) Porto	(England) Chelsea	15	13.3	2011	
4	(Portugal) José Mourinho	(Portugal) Benfica	(Spain) Real Madrid	15	12.9	2026	
6	(Belgium) Vincent Kompany	(England) Burnley	(Germany) Bayern Munich	12	10.2	2024	
7	(Denmark) Thomas Frank	(England) Brentford	(England) Tottenham Hotspur	11.9	10	2025	
8	(Italy) Enzo Maresca (1)	(England) Leicester City	(England) Chelsea	11.8	10	2024	
9	(Germany) Matthias Jaissle	(Saudi Arabia) Al-Ahli	(England) Newcastle United	11.1	9.5	2026	
10	(Netherlands) Arne Slot	(Netherlands) Feyenoord	(England) Liverpool	11	9.4	2024	
10	(Portugal) Ruben Amorim	(Portugal) Sporting CP	(England) Manchester United	11	9.3	2024	

== Women ==
This list only includes transfers where a fee amount is reported publicly. The transfer fees are ranked in Pound (£) and based on the exchange rate at the time of the transfer. Fees are in thousands.

As of 29 July 2026

Fee broke the women's world football transfer record at the time of the transfer
Fee broke the national league record at the time of the transfer
Fee broke the women's record for a South American player at the time of the transfer

‡ In player transfers between the National Women's Soccer League (NWSL) and other leagues after summer 2024, the NWSL as a single-entity organization conducts the transaction and pays or receives any fees, rather than member clubs conducting the deal directly. There are various ways for teams to purchase credits from the league. Such transfers into the league are subject to FIFA transfer regulations.

Rank	Player	From	To	Position	Transfer fee			Year	Ref(s).
Rank	Player	From	To	Position	£ thousand	€ thousand	$ thousand	Year	Ref(s).
1	(France) Grace Geyoro	(France) Paris Saint-Germain	(England) London City Lionesses	Midfielder	1,430 (Note: Originally reported in French sources as a world record fee of £1.43 million, London City stated the next day that it was not a record but "around the £1m mark". London City also spent around £430,000 on Lucía Corrales in the same window. When FIFA's 2025 report on international transfers was released at the end of the year, Geyoro was listed as the most expensive transfer, necessitating it as a world record fee.)	1,650	1,923	2025	
2	(United States) Alyssa Thompson	(United States) Angel City	(England) Chelsea	Forward	<1,430 (Note: Thompson's transfer, which was confirmed shortly before Geyoro's, was a Chelsea record fee; "at least on-par" with Smith's previous record fee (which as a domestic fee would not be listed by FIFA); and described as just short of Ovalle's then-world record but able to become a new world record with bonuses that would take Thompson's fee up to around $2 million. At the end of 2025, FIFA confirmed Thompson's transfer as the second most expensive international transfer behind Geyoro's and above Ovalle's.)	<1,650	<1,923	2025	
3	(Sweden) Felicia Schröder	(Sweden) BK Häcken	(Spain) Real Madrid	Forward	1,294	1,500 (Note: Häcken declined to disclose the transfer fee but said that it would be a world record based on the reported fee for Ovalle's August 2025 record. The fee was otherwise reported as €1.5 million. As Ovalle was listed by FIFA as the third most expensive women's transfer of 2025, Schröder's transfer exceeding that could be a new record, or second or third. Based on reporting of Geyoro's record, the reported €1.5 million for Schröder would be second or third behind that.)	1,714	2026	
3	(Brazil) Kerolin	(England) Manchester City	(Spain) Barcelona	Forward	1,280	1,500 (Note: Around €1.2 million base fee and performance-based variables up to around €1.5 million total.)	1,700	2026	
5	(Mexico) Lizbeth Ovalle ‡	(Mexico) Tigres UANL	(United States) Orlando Pride	Forward	1,111	1,285	1,500 (Note: Mexican reports suggested the fee could rise to $2 million, though sources in the United States and elsewhere confirmed its ceiling at $1.5 million.)	2025	
6	(Canada) Olivia Smith	(England) Liverpool	(England) Arsenal	Forward	1,000	1,160	1,360	2025	
7	(United States) Naomi Girma	(United States) San Diego Wave	(England) Chelsea	Defender	883	1,050	1,100	2025	
8	(France) Melvine Malard	(England) Manchester United	(England) Chelsea	Forward	850 (Note: Typically reported as £850k, some sources suggested £750k; the fee was equated to over €1 million, which also aligns with the higher amount.)	1,000	1,138	2026	
9	(Brazil) Tarciane	(United States) Houston Dash	(France) OL Lyonnes	Defender	797	960 (Note: Reported as a Houston Dash club record sale and "among the highest in NWSL history", it had previously been reported as equivalent to $830,000 and almost a world record with potential bonuses (up to €960,000). By the end of the season, the bonuses were reportedly met.)	979	2025	
10	(Paraguay) Claudia Martínez ‡	(Paraguay) Olimpia	(United States) Washington Spirit	Forward	703	805	950	2026	

== Gallery ==
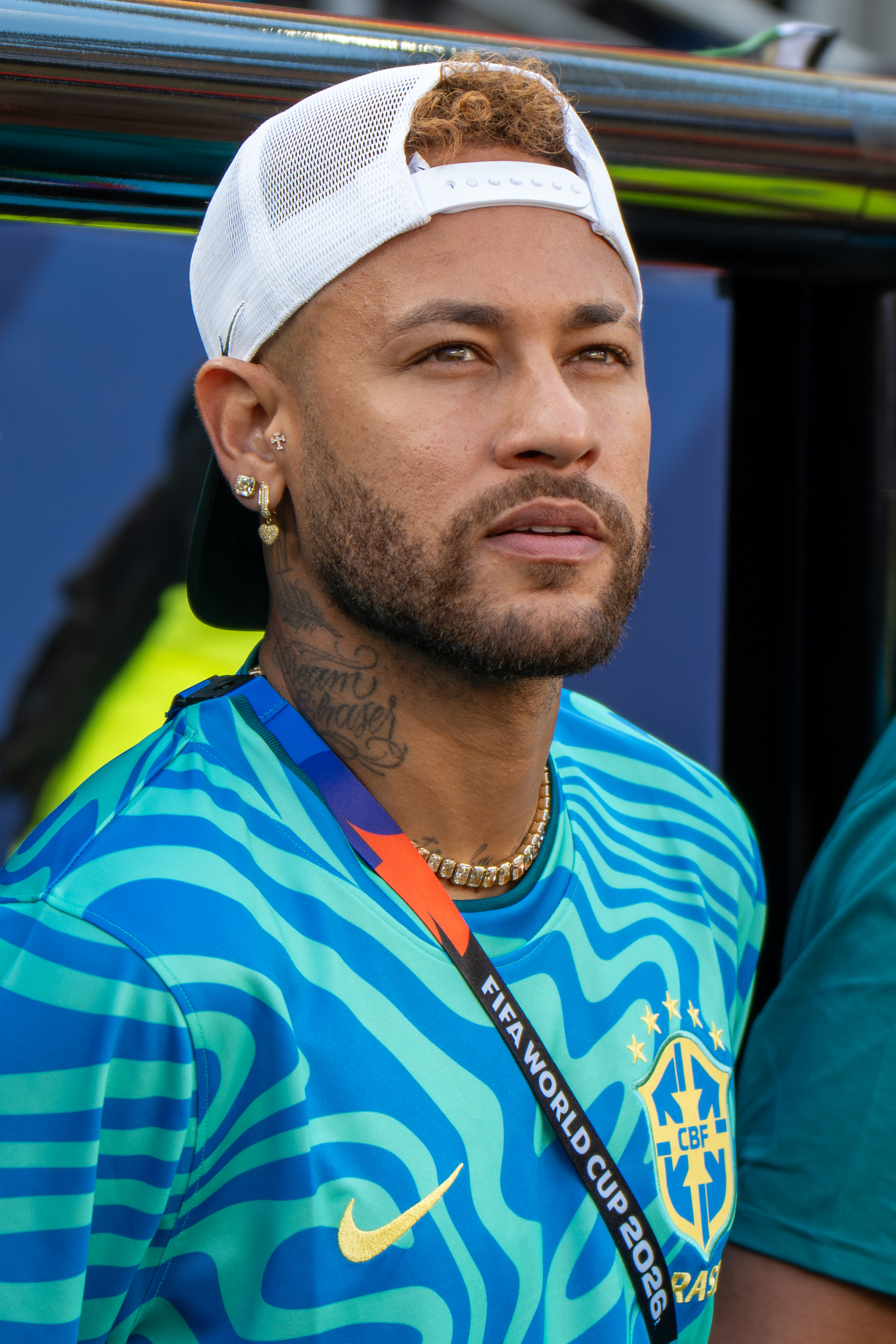
Neymar, the most expensive forward and the most expensive footballer

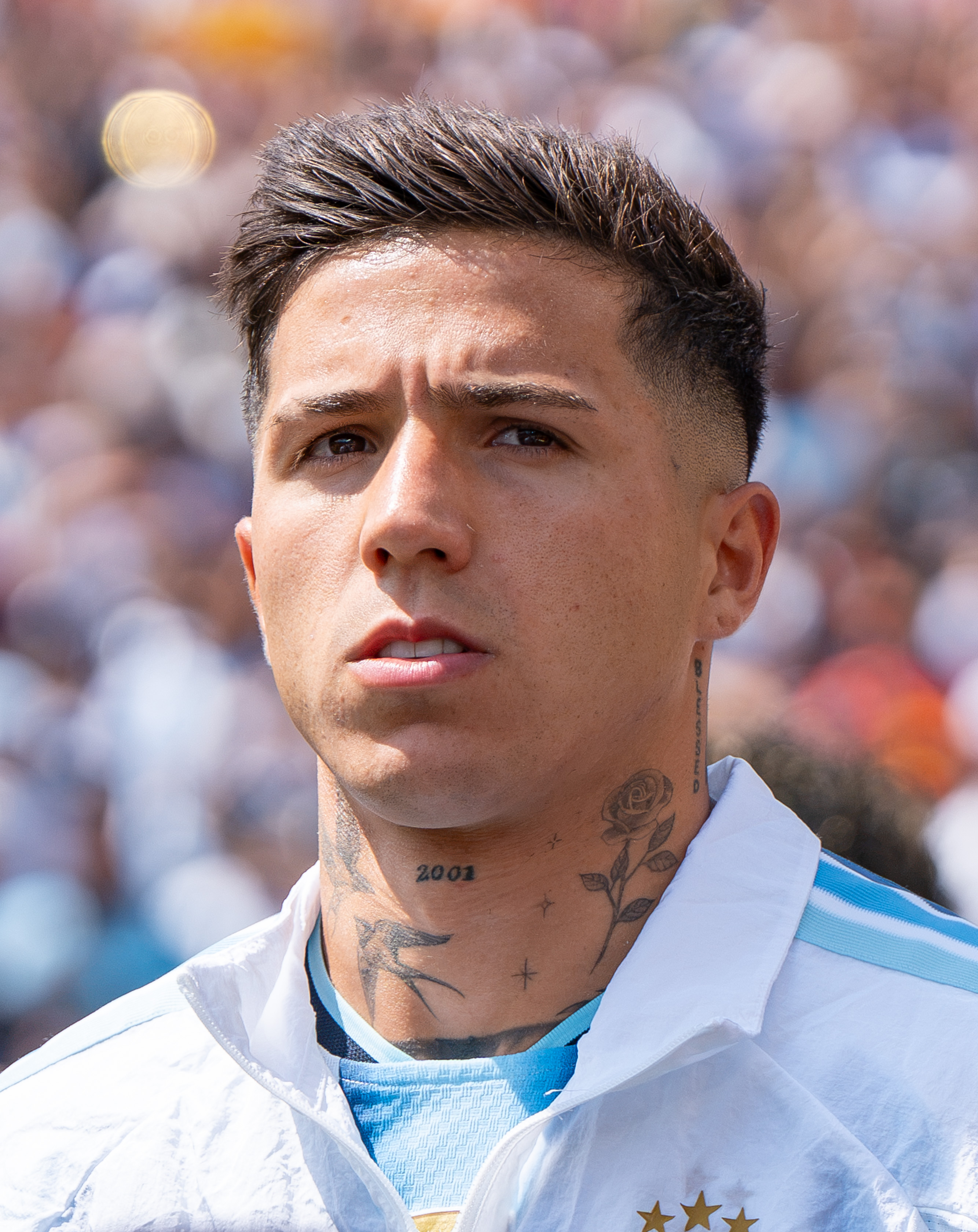
Enzo Fernández, the most expensive midfielder

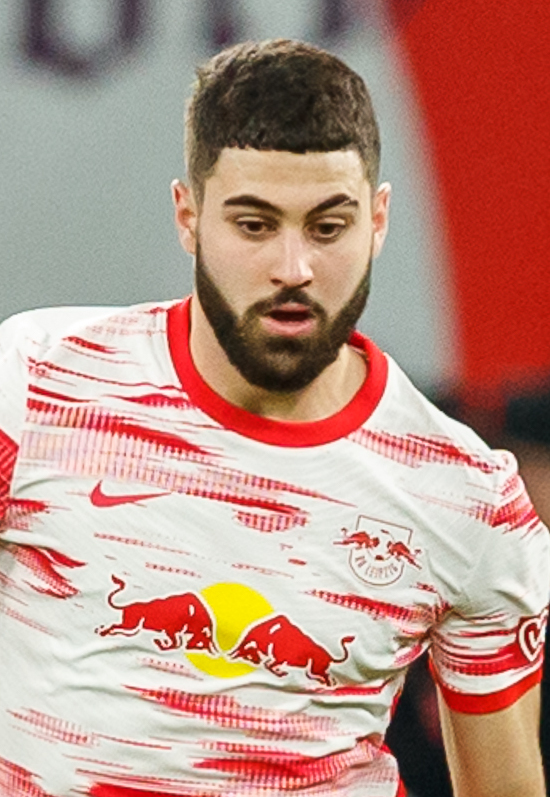
Joško Gvardiol, the most expensive defender

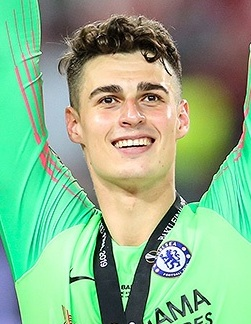
Kepa Arrizabalaga, the most expensive goalkeeper

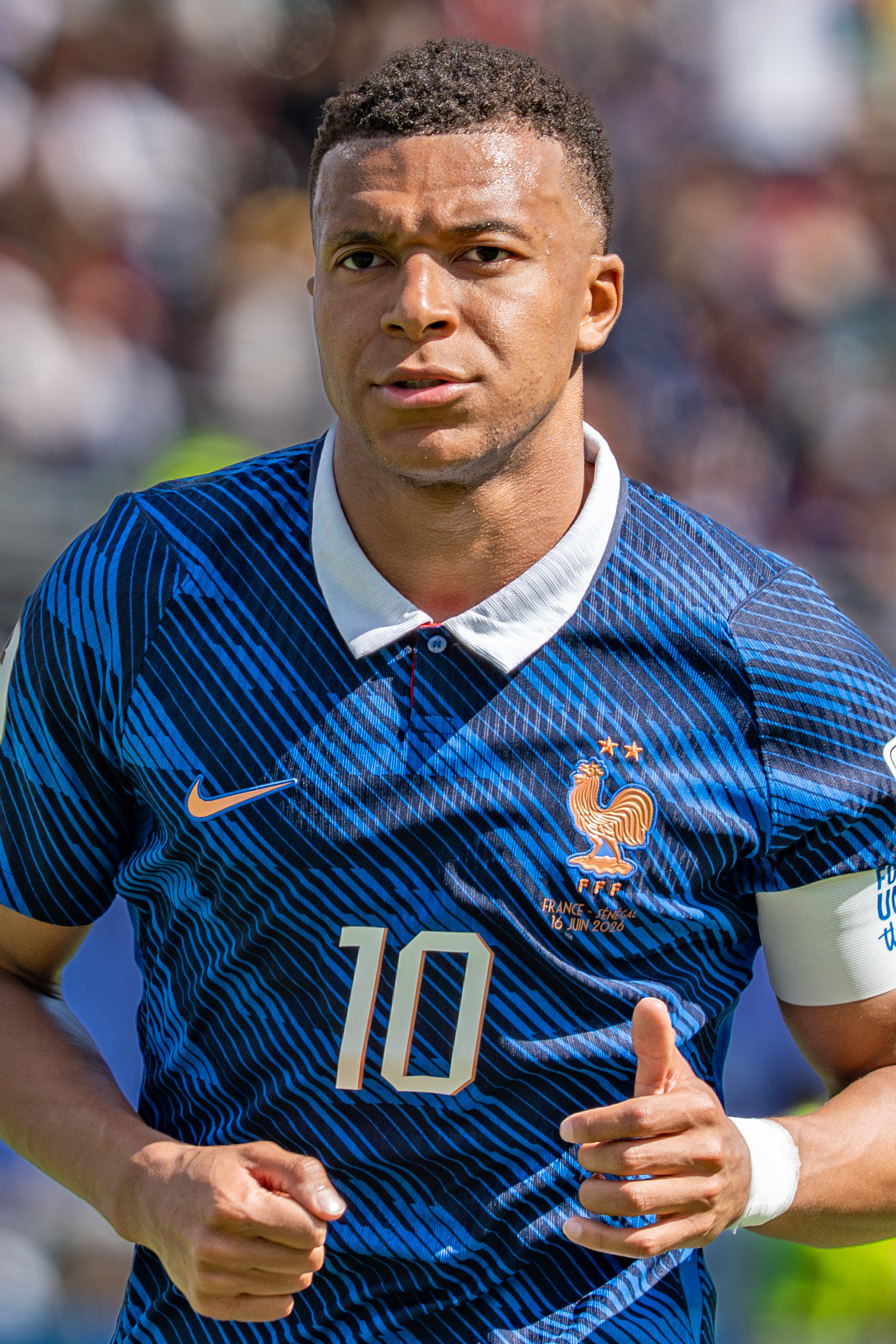
Kylian Mbappé, the most expensive teenager and the most expensive player in a domestic transfer

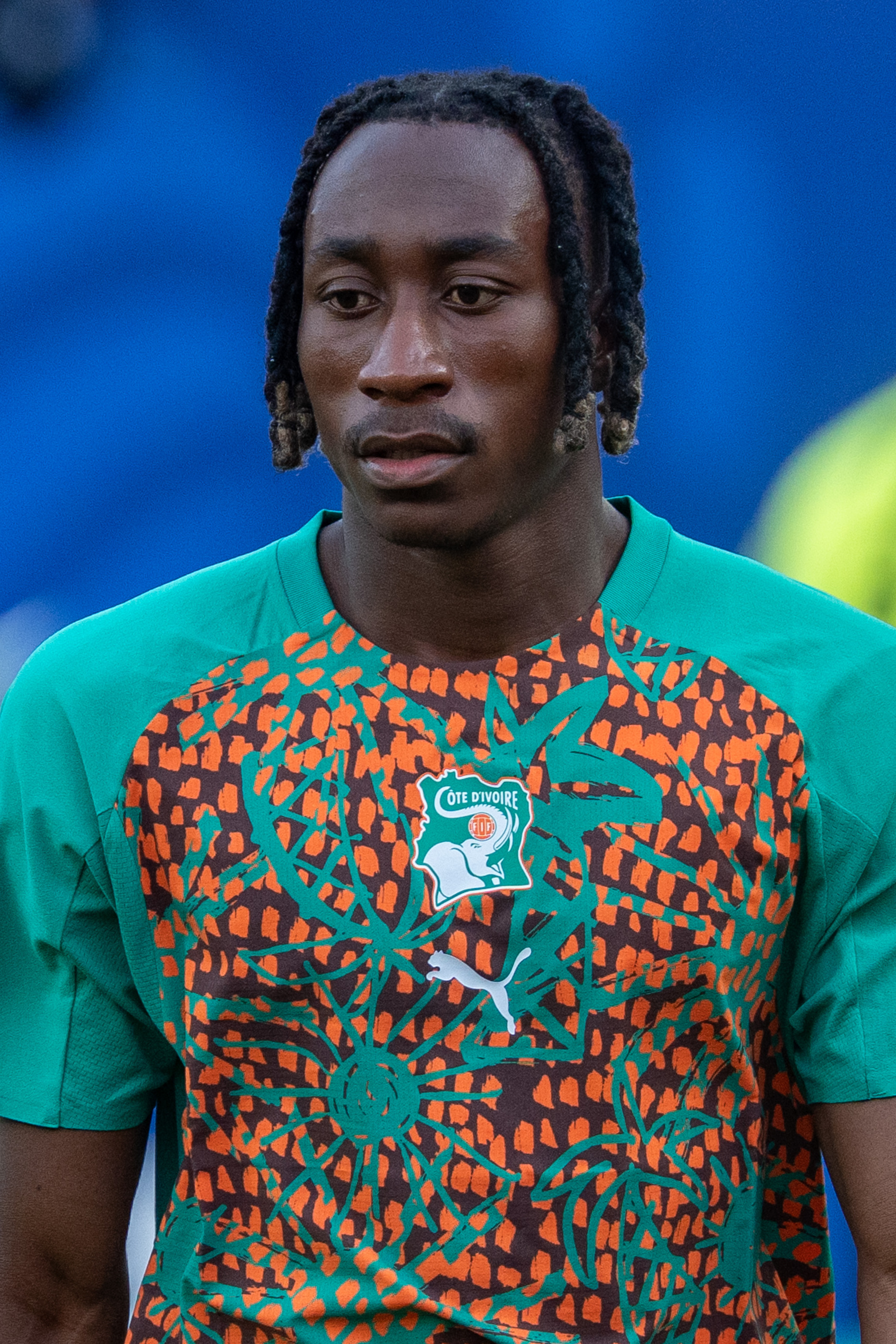
Yan Diomande, the most expensive African player (CAF)

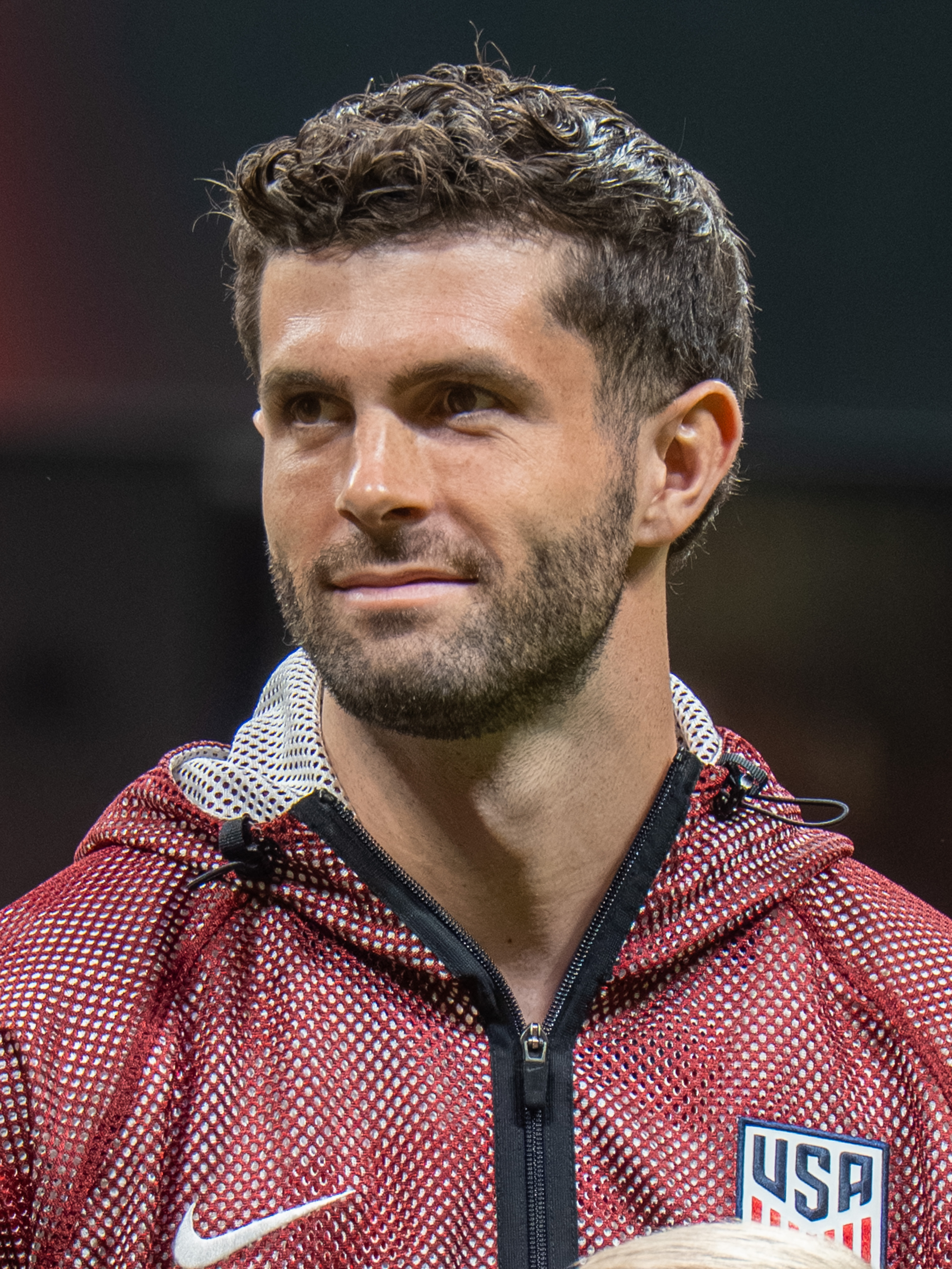
Christian Pulisic, the most expensive North American player (CONCACAF)

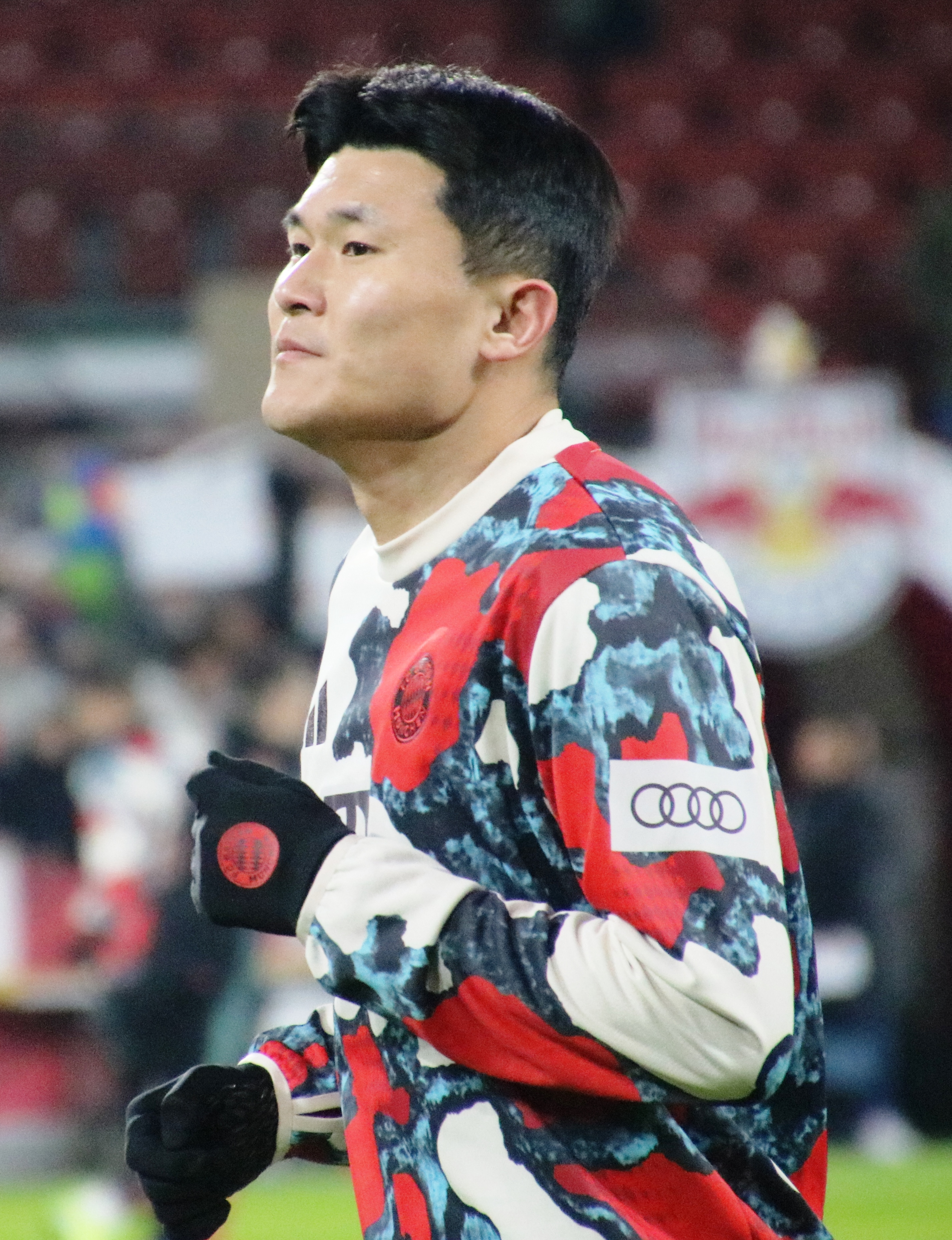
Kim Min-jae, the most expensive Asian player (AFC)

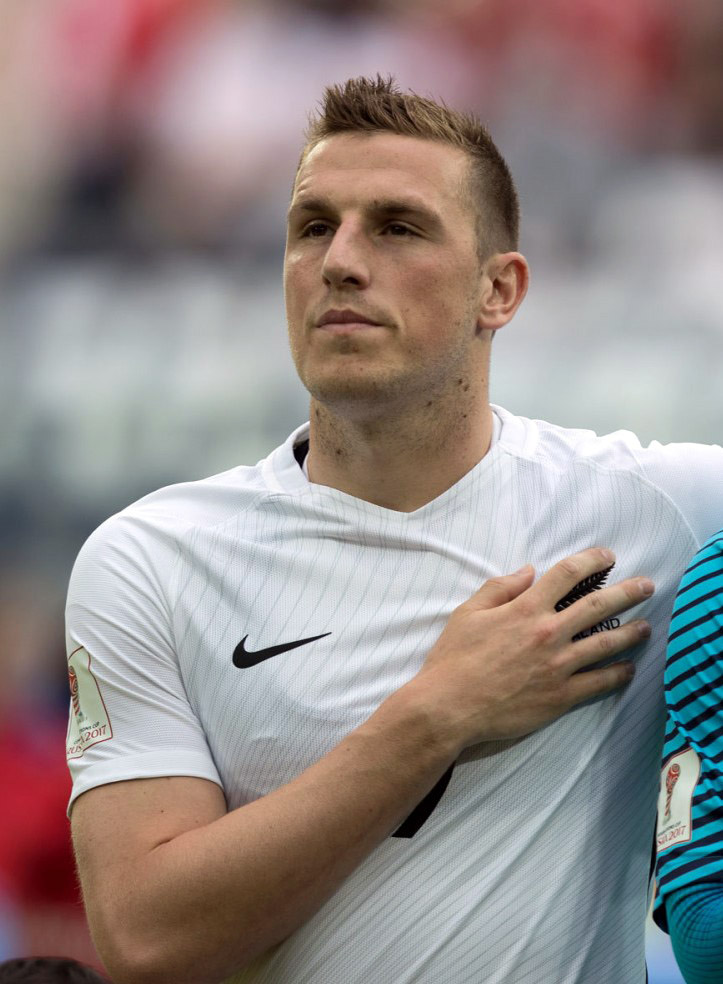
Chris Wood, the most expensive Oceania player (OFC)

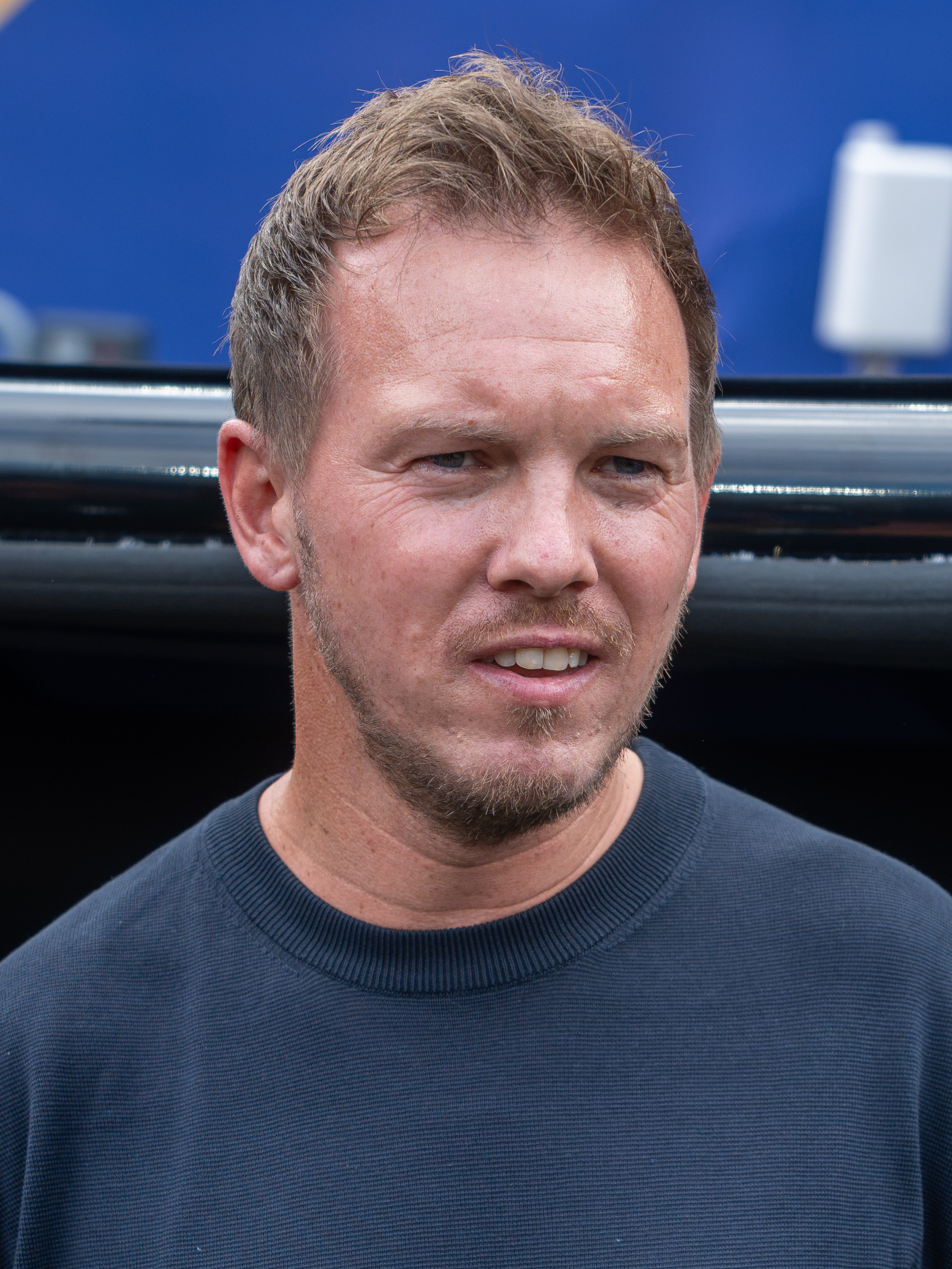
Julian Nagelsmann, the most expensive manager

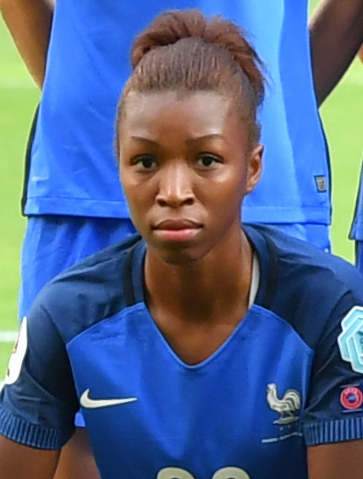
Grace Geyoro, the most expensive women's footballer

== See also ==
- List of most expensive American soccer transfers
- List of most expensive English football transfers
- List of world association football records
- Professionalism in association football
