= Devaughn =

Devaughn is both a surname and a given name, an altered spelling of Irish surname Devine. Notable people with the name include:

== Surname ==
- Dennis DeVaughn (born 1960), American football player
- Horace DeVaughn (died 1927), American inmate
- Raheem DeVaughn (born 1975), American singer and songwriter
- William DeVaughn (born 1947), American R&B singer, songwriter and guitarist
- Will Devaughn (born 1982), Filipino commercial model and actor

== Given name ==
- DeVaughn Akoon-Purcell (born 1993), Trinidadian-American basketball player
- Devaughn Elliott (born 1991), Kittian footballer
- DeVaughn Nixon (born 1983), American actor
- Devaughn Vele (born 1997), American football player
- DeVaughn Washington (born 1989), American football player
- Devaughn Williamson (born 1997), Bahamanian footballer
