= Abdoulie Bah (politician) =

Gambian politician

Lord Mayor of Banjul
- In office 2013–2018
- Preceded by: Samba Faal
- Succeeded by: Rohey Malick Lowe

Abdoulie Bah, also known as Lie Bah (born 24 June 1948, in Bathurst; died 16 June 2018, in Banjul), was a Gambian politician. From 2013 to 2018, he served as the Lord Mayor of Banjul, the capital city of the Gambia. Bah was the 15th Mayor of the city.

== Life ==
Bah attended Muhammedan Primary School and then Banjul City Council School. In 1987, he was elected as a councilor of the Banjul City Council from the Campama ward. In the 2013 Gambian local elections, Bah, running as an independent candidate, defeated incumbent mayor Samba Faal (APRC) with 51.2% of the vote to become the Lord Mayor of Banjul.

In the 2018 Gambian local elections, Bah lost to Rohey Malick Lowe, the candidate of the United Democratic Party (UDP).

== Death ==
Bah died a few days before his 70th birthday in Banjul.

== Awards and honors ==
- 2016 – 22 July Revolution Award
