= Mohamed Amelhaf =

French footballer

Personal information
- Date of birth: 25 November 1997 (age 28)
- Place of birth: France
- Height: 1.76 m (5 ft 9 in)
- Position: Forward

Team information
- Current team: KVK Westhoek
- Number: 24

Senior career*
Years	Team	Apps	(Gls)
2016–2018	Kortrijk II	15	(5)
2017–2018	Kortrijk	0	(0)
2018	KFC Poperinge	33	(13)
2019	VfR Aalen	7	(0)
2019–2020	Saint-Amand FC	16	(4)
2020–2022	1. FC Bruchsal	28	(9)
2022–2023	IC Croix	6	(1)
2023	FC Thierrens	6	(3)
2023–2025	FC Stade-Payerne	38	(10)
2025–	KVK Westhoek	0	(0)
- * Club domestic league appearances and goals as of 15:37, 21 January 2026 (UTC)

Mohamed Amelhaf (Arabic: محمد أملحاف; born 25 November 1997) is a French footballer who plays as a forward for KVK Westhoek.

== Career ==
Born in France to Moroccan parents, Amelhaf signed for Kortrijk II. After a year, he joined KFC Poperinge in Belgium.

On 1 July 2019, he signed a professional contract with VfR Aalen. He made his professional debut for VfR Aalen in the 3. Liga on 13 March 2019, coming on as a substitute in the 68th minute for Johannes Bühler in the 3–0 away win against Karlsruher SC.

On 2 July 2019, Amelhaf agreed to a three-year contract with French club Saint-Amand FC.

On 6 August 2020, he signed for German club 1. FC Bruchsal.

In February 2022, Amelhaf joined Championnat National 3 club IC Croix.

After a brief career break, he signed with Swiss club FC Thierrens on 21 February 2023, but left the club at the end of the season.

In the summer of 2023, he joined Swiss club FC Stade-Payerne, but departed from the club in early January 2025, opting to return to France.
