= List of most expensive English football transfers =

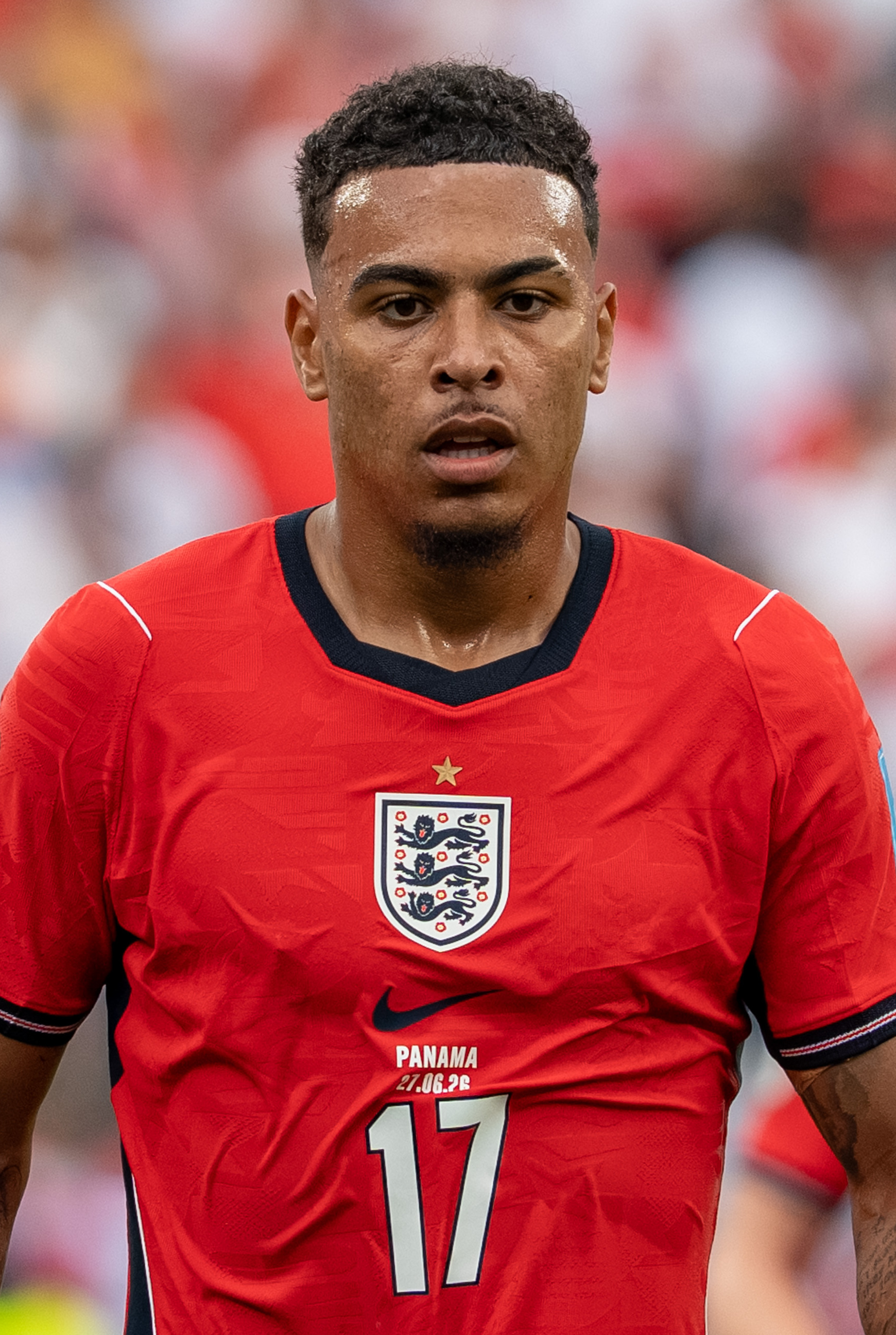
Morgan Rogers, whose move to Chelsea marked the highest transfer fee ever paid for an English footballer.

The following is a list of the most expensive English football transfers, which details the highest transfer fees ever paid for English footballers, as well as the largest transfer fees paid and received by English football clubs. The current transfer record for an English footballer was set by the transfer of Morgan Rogers from Aston Villa to Chelsea for £117 million in July 2026, while the record for an English woman was set by the transfer of Keira Walsh from Barcelona to Chelsea for £714,000 in January 2025.

The records for the largest transfer fees both paid and received by an English football club were set by the transfer of Alexander Isak from Newcastle United to Liverpool for £125 million in September 2025. The record for the largest transfer fee paid by an English women's football club was set by the signing of Grace Geyoro from Paris Saint-Germain to the London City Lionesses for £1.43 million in September 2025, while the record fee received by an English women's club was set by the transfer of Olivia Smith from Liverpool to Arsenal for £1 million in July 2025.

== Men ==
=== Highest transfer payments for English footballers ===
All clubs involved in transfers on this list belong to a Big Five league, with the exception of one transfer involving a club under the Saudi Arabian Football Federation. The remaining transfers involved clubs from England, Spain, or Germany, with English clubs involved in all but one transaction. Overall, Manchester City has the most appearances on the list, with six, and also leads all clubs with five incoming transfers. Aston Villa leads all clubs with four outgoing transfers.

Six transfers on the list broke the record for an English footballer, with all of which being deals between English clubs. Manchester City leads with four record-breaking incoming transfers, while Chelsea and Manchester United have one each. In contrast, Aston Villa leads with two record-breaking outgoing transfers, while Nottingham Forest, Leicester City, Tottenham Hotspur, and Liverpool have recorded one each. Among the Big Six, Liverpool is the only club without an incoming transfer on the list, whereas Manchester United and Arsenal are the only two without an outgoing transfers. No club based in England outside of the Big Six has made a purchase that features on this list. Raheem Sterling is the only footballer to appear twice on the list, following his record-breaking move to Manchester City in 2015 and his subsequent transfer to Chelsea in 2022.

The majority of transfer fees listed are not officially disclosed by the trading clubs and are reported by reliable mainstream media. Different media outlets may report varying transfer fees. The transfer fees are ranked in Pounds (£) without accounting for add-ons, with fees that include add-ons signified by a note.

As of 31 August 2026

Fee broke the record for an English footballer at the time of the transfer

Top 20 most expensive transfers for English footballers
Rank	Player	From	To	Position	Fee (£ million)	Year	Ref.
1	Morgan Rogers	(England) Aston Villa	(England) Chelsea	Midfielder	117	2026	
2	Elliot Anderson	(England) Nottingham Forest	(England) Manchester City	Midfielder	116	2026	
3	Jack Grealish	(England) Aston Villa	(England) Manchester City	Midfielder	100	2021	
3	Declan Rice	(England) West Ham United	(England) Arsenal	Midfielder	100 (Note: Initial £100 million plus £5 million in possible add-ons)	2023	
5	Jude Bellingham	(Germany) Borussia Dortmund	(Spain) Real Madrid	Midfielder	88.5 (Note: Initial £88.5 million plus £26 million in possible add-ons)	2023	
6	Harry Kane	(England) Tottenham Hotspur	(Germany) Bayern Munich	Forward	86 (Note: Initial £86 million plus £17 million in possible add-ons)	2023	
7	Harry Maguire	(England) Leicester City	(England) Manchester United	Defender	80	2019	
8	Jadon Sancho	(Germany) Borussia Dortmund	(England) Manchester United	Midfielder	73 (Note: Initial £73 million plus £5 million in possible add-ons)	2021	
9	Anthony Gordon	(England) Newcastle United	(Spain) Barcelona	Forward	60.6 (Note: Initial £60.6 million plus £8.7 million in possible add-ons)	2026	
10	Eberechi Eze	(England) Crystal Palace	(England) Arsenal	Forward	60 (Note: Initial £60 million plus £7.5 million in possible add-ons)	2025	
11	Mason Mount	(England) Chelsea	(England) Manchester United	Midfielder	55 (Note: Initial £55 million plus £5 million in possible add-ons)	2023	
11	Dominic Solanke	(England) Bournemouth	(England) Tottenham Hotspur	Forward	55 (Note: Initial £55 million plus £10 million in possible add-ons)	2024	
13	Ezri Konsa	(England) Aston Villa	(England) Arsenal	Defender	51	2026	
14	Ollie Watkins	(England) Aston Villa	(Saudi Arabia) Al-Hilal	Forward	50	2026	
14	Ben White	(England) Brighton & Hove Albion	(England) Arsenal	Defender	50	2021	
14	Kyle Walker	(England) Tottenham Hotspur	(England) Manchester City	Defender	50 (Note: Initial £50 million plus £3 million in possible add-ons)	2017	
17	Raheem Sterling (1)	(England) Liverpool	(England) Manchester City	Forward	49	2015	
18	Jamie Gittens	(Germany) Borussia Dortmund	(England) Chelsea	Forward	48.5 (Note: Initial £48.5 million plus £3 million in possible add-ons)	2025	
18	Noni Madueke	(England) Chelsea	(England) Arsenal	Forward	48.5 (Note: Initial £48.5 million plus £4 million in possible add-ons)	2025	
20	Raheem Sterling (2)	(England) Manchester City	(England) Chelsea	Forward	47.5	2022	
20	John Stones	(England) Everton	(England) Manchester City	Defender	47.5	2016	

=== Transfer fees involving English football clubs ===
==== Highest transfer payments paid by English football clubs ====
The majority of transfer fees listed are not officially disclosed by the trading clubs and are reported by reliable mainstream media. Different media outlets may report varying transfer fees. The transfer fees are ranked in Pounds (£) without accounting for add-ons, with fees that include add-ons signified by a note.

Fee broke the world record at the time of the transfer
Fee broke the Premier League record at the time of the transfer

Top 20 most expensive incoming transfers by English clubs
Rank	Player	From	To	Position	Fee (£ million)	Year	Ref.
1	(Sweden) Alexander Isak	(England) Newcastle United	Liverpool	Forward	125 (Note: Initial £125 million plus £5 million in possible add-ons)	2025	
1	(Argentina) Enzo Fernández (2)	(England) Chelsea	Manchester City	Midfielder	125	2026	
3	(England) Morgan Rogers	(England) Aston Villa	Chelsea	Forward	117	2026	
4	(England) Elliot Anderson	(England) Nottingham Forest	Manchester City	Midfielder	116	2026	
5	(Argentina) Enzo Fernández (1)	(Portugal) Benfica	Chelsea	Midfielder	106.8	2023	
6	(France) Bradley Barcola	(France) Paris Saint-Germain	Liverpool	Forward	106 (Note: Initial £106 million plus £17 million in possible add-ons)	2026	
7	(England) Jack Grealish	(England) Aston Villa	Manchester City	Midfielder	100	2021	
7	(Germany) Florian Wirtz	(Germany) Bayer Leverkusen	Liverpool	Midfielder	100 (Note: Initial £100 million plus £16 million in possible add-ons)	2025	
7	(England) Declan Rice	(England) West Ham United	Arsenal	Midfielder	100 (Note: Initial £100 million plus £5 million in possible add-ons)	2023	
7	(Ecuador) Moisés Caicedo	(England) Brighton & Hove Albion	Chelsea	Midfielder	100 (Note: Initial £100 million plus £15 million in possible add-ons)	2023	
11	(Belgium) Romelu Lukaku (2)	(Italy) Inter Milan	Chelsea	Forward	97.5	2021	
12	(Italy) Sandro Tonali	(England) Newcastle United	Tottenham Hotspur	Midfielder	92.5 (Note: Initial £92.5 million plus £7.5 million in possible add-ons)	2026	
13	(France) Paul Pogba	(Italy) Juventus	Manchester United	Midfielder	89.3 (Note: Initial £89.3 million plus £3.0 million in possible add-ons)	2016	
14	(Portugal) Mateus Fernandes	(England) West Ham United	Tottenham Hotspur	Midfielder	85	2026	
15	(Morocco) Ayyoub Bouaddi	(France) Lille	Manchester City	Midfielder	81.4 (Note: Initial £81.4 million plus £4.3 million in possible add-ons)	2026	
16	(Brazil) Antony	(Netherlands) Ajax	Manchester United	Forward	81.3 (Note: Initial £81.3 million plus £4.27 million in possible add-ons)	2022	
17	(England) Harry Maguire	(England) Leicester City	Manchester United	Defender	80	2019	
18	(Croatia) Joško Gvardiol	(Germany) RB Leipzig	Manchester City	Defender	77	2023	
19	(Belgium) Romelu Lukaku (1)	(England) Everton	Manchester United	Forward	75 (Note: Initial £75 million plus £15 million in possible add-ons)	2017	
19	(Netherlands) Virgil van Dijk	(England) Southampton	Liverpool	Defender	75	2018	
19	(Brazil) Bruno Guimarães	(England) Newcastle United	Arsenal	Midfielder	75	2026	
19	(Brazil) Sávio	(England) Manchester City	Tottenham Hotspur	Forward	75 (Note: Initial £75 million plus £10 million in possible add-ons)	2026	

==== Highest transfer payments received by English football clubs ====
The majority of transfer fees listed are not officially disclosed by the trading clubs and are reported by reliable mainstream media. Different media outlets may report varying transfer fees. The transfer fees are ranked in Pounds (£) without accounting for add-ons, with fees that include add-ons signified by a note.

Fee broke the world record at the time of the transfer
Fee broke the transfer record for the buying club's country at the time of the transfer

Top 20 most expensive outgoing transfers by English clubs
Rank	Player	From	To	Position	Fee (£ million)	Year	Ref.
1	(Sweden) Alexander Isak	Newcastle United	(England) Liverpool	Forward	125 (Note: Initial £125 million plus £5 million in possible add-ons)	2025	
1	(Argentina) Enzo Fernández	Chelsea	(England) Manchester City	Midfielder	125	2026	
3	(England) Morgan Rogers	Aston Villa	(England) Chelsea	Forward	117	2026	
4	(England) Elliot Anderson	Nottingham Forest	(England) Manchester City	Midfielder	116	2026	
5	(Brazil) Philippe Coutinho	Liverpool	(Spain) Barcelona	Midfielder	105 (Note: Initial £105 million plus £37 million in possible add-ons)	2018	
6	(England) Jack Grealish	Aston Villa	(England) Manchester City	Midfielder	100	2021	
6	(England) Declan Rice	West Ham United	(England) Arsenal	Midfielder	100 (Note: Initial £100 million plus £5 million in possible add-ons)	2023	
6	(Ecuador) Moisés Caicedo	Brighton & Hove Albion	(England) Chelsea	Midfielder	100 (Note: Initial £100 million plus £15 million in possible add-ons)	2023	
9	(Italy) Sandro Tonali	Newcastle United	(England) Tottenham Hotspur	Midfielder	92.5 (Note: Initial £92.5 million plus £7.5 million in possible add-ons)	2026	
10	(Belgium) Eden Hazard	Chelsea	(Spain) Real Madrid	Forward	89 (Note: Initial £89 million plus £60 million in possible add-ons)	2019	
11	(England) Harry Kane	Tottenham Hotspur	(Germany) Bayern Munich	Forward	86 (Note: Initial £86 million plus £17 million in possible add-ons)	2023	
12	(Wales) Gareth Bale	Tottenham Hotspur	(Spain) Real Madrid	Forward	85.3	2013	
13	(Portugal) Mateus Fernandes	West Ham United	(England) Tottenham Hotspur	Midfielder	85	2026	
14	(Portugal) Cristiano Ronaldo	Manchester United	(Spain) Real Madrid	Forward	80	2009	
14	(England) Harry Maguire	Leicester City	(England) Manchester United	Defender	80	2019	
16	(Belgium) Romelu Lukaku (1)	Everton	(England) Manchester United	Forward	75 (Note: Initial £75 million plus £15 million in possible add-ons)	2017	
16	(Netherlands) Virgil van Dijk	Southampton	(England) Liverpool	Defender	75	2018	
16	(Brazil) Bruno Guimarães	Newcastle	(England) Arsenal	Midfielder	75	2026	
16	(Brazil) Sávio	Manchester City	(England) Tottenham	Forward	75 (Note: Initial £75 million plus £10 million in possible add-ons)	2026	
20	(Belgium) Romelu Lukaku (2)	Manchester United	(Italy) Inter Milan	Forward	74	2019	

== Women ==
=== Highest transfer payments for English footballers ===
The majority of transfer fees listed are not officially disclosed by the trading clubs and are reported by reliable mainstream media. Different media outlets may report varying transfer fees. The transfer fees are ranked in Pounds (£).

Fee broke the women's world football transfer record at the time of the transfer
Fee broke the record for an English woman at the time of the transfer

Top 10 most expensive transfers for English women
Rank	Player	From	To	Position	Fee (£ thousand)	Year	Ref.
1	Keira Walsh (2)	(Spain) Barcelona	(England) Chelsea	Midfielder	714	2025	
2	Niamh Charles	(England) Chelsea	(England) Manchester City	Defender	500	2026	
3	Keira Walsh (1)	(England) Manchester City	(Spain) Barcelona	Midfielder	400 (Note: The approximately £400,000 figure is most consistently reported and accepted.)	2022	
4	Bethany England	(England) Chelsea	(England) Tottenham Hotspur	Forward	250	2023	
5	Laura Blindkilde Brown	(England) Aston Villa	(England) Manchester City	Midfielder	200	2024	
5	Lauren James	(England) Manchester United	(England) Chelsea	Forward	200	2021	
5	Anouk Denton	(England) West Ham United	(United States) Bay FC	Defender	200	2026	
8	Ebony Salmon	(United States) Racing Louisville	(United States) Houston Dash	Forward	150 (Note: Traded for $190,000 in NWSL allocation money, which equated to approximately £150,000 at the time of the transfer.)	2022	
9	Rachel Daly	(United States) Houston Dash	(England) Aston Villa	Forward	125	2022	
10	Esme Morgan	(England) Manchester City	(United States) Washington Spirit	Defender	100 (Note: Reported as an undisclosed "six-figure sum" at the time of transfer.)	2024	

=== Transfer fees involving English football clubs ===
==== Highest transfer payments paid by English football clubs ====
Fee broke the women's world football transfer record at the time of the transfer
Fee broke the Women's Super League record at the time of the transfer

Top 10 most expensive incoming transfers by English clubs (Women)
Rank	Player	From	To	Position	Fee (£ thousand)	Year	Ref.
1	(France) Grace Geyoro	(France) Paris Saint-Germain	London City Lionesses	Midfielder	1,430 (Note: Originally reported in French sources as a world record fee of £1.43 million, London City stated the next day that it was not a record but "around the £1m mark". London City also spent around £430,000 on Lucía Corrales in the same window. When FIFA's 2025 report on international transfers was released at the end of the year, Geyoro was listed as the most expensive transfer, necessitating it as a world record fee.)	2025	
2	(United States) Alyssa Thompson	(United States) Angel City	Chelsea	Forward	<1,430 (Note: Thompson's transfer, which was confirmed shortly before Geyoro's, was a Chelsea record fee; "at least on-par" with Smith's previous record fee (which as a domestic fee would not be listed by FIFA); and described as just short of Ovalle's then-world record but able to become a new world record with bonuses that would take Thompson's fee up to around $2 million. At the end of 2025, FIFA confirmed Thompson's transfer as the second most expensive international transfer behind Geyoro's and above Ovalle's.)	2025	
3	(Canada) Olivia Smith	(England) Liverpool	Arsenal	Forward	1,000	2025	
4	(United States) Naomi Girma	(United States) San Diego Wave	Chelsea	Defender	883	2025	
5	(England) Keira Walsh	(Spain) Barcelona	Chelsea	Midfielder	714 (Note: Base fee of €550,000 (£460,000), as widely reported. According to BBC Sport, Barcelona said that the fee including bonuses was worth up to £800,000 (€956,000). At the end of the season, Spanish media reported the fee had risen to €850,000.)	2025	
6	(United States) Sam Coffey	(United States) Portland Thorns	Manchester City	Midfielder	650	2026	
7	(Sweden) Ellen Wangerheim	(Sweden) Hammarby	Manchester United	Forward	560 (Note: Reported as 7 million Swedish krona)	2026	
8	(England) Niamh Charles	(England) Chelsea	Manchester City	Defender	500	2026	
9	(France) Oriane Jean-François	(England) Chelsea	Aston Villa	Midfielder	450	2026	
10	(Spain) Lucía Corrales	(Spain) Barcelona	London City Lionesses	Forward	433	2025	

==== Highest transfer payments received by English football clubs ====
Fee broke the women's world football transfer record at the time of the transfer
Fee broke the women's transfer record for the buying club's country at the time of the transfer

Top 10 most expensive outgoing transfers by English clubs (Women)
Rank	Player	From	To	Position	Fee (£ thousand)	Year	Ref.
1	(Canada) Olivia Smith	Liverpool	(England) Arsenal	Forward	1,000	2025	
2	(England) Niamh Charles	Chelsea	(England) Manchester City	Defender	500	2026	
3	(France) Oriane Jean-François	Chelsea	(England) Aston Villa	Midfielder	450	2026	
4	(England) Keira Walsh	Manchester City	(Spain) Barcelona	Midfielder	400 (Note: The approximately £400,000 figure is most consistently reported and accepted.)	2022	
5	Bethany England	Chelsea	(England) Tottenham Hotspur	Forward	250	2023	
5	(Canada) Jessie Fleming	Chelsea	(United States) Portland Thorns	Midfielder	250	2024	
7	(United States) Catarina Macario	Chelsea	(United States) San Diego Wave	Forward	225	2026	
8	(England) Laura Blindkilde Brown	Aston Villa	(England) Manchester City	Midfielder	200	2024	
8	(England) Lauren James	Manchester United	(England) Chelsea	Forward	200	2021	
8	(England) Anouk Denton	West Ham United	(United States) Bay FC	Defender	200	2026	

== See also ==
- Football in England
- Premier League
- Women's Super League
- List of most expensive association football transfers
- List of most expensive women's association football transfers
- Progression of the British football transfer fee record
