= Filip Sachpekidis =

Swedish footballer

Personal information
- Full name: Filip Filipos Lars Sachpekidis
- Date of birth: 3 July 1997 (age 29)
- Place of birth: Kalmar, Sweden
- Height: 1.80 m (5 ft 11 in)
- Positions: Right winger; centre forward

Team information
- Current team: Landskrona
- Number: 5

Youth career
- –2010: Lindsdal
- 2011–2013: Kalmar

Senior career*
Years	Team	Apps	(Gls)
2013–2022	Kalmar	143	(7)
2023	Levadiakos	10	(0)
2024–	Landskrona	19	(0)

International career
2012–2014	Sweden U17	18	(5)
2015	Sweden U19	7	(1)
- * Club domestic league appearances and goals as of 14 November 2024

Filip Filipos Lars Sachpekidis (born 3 July 1997) is a Swedish professional footballer who plays for Superettan club Landskrona BoIS as a right winger and centre forward.

== Career ==
He is the youngest goalscorer in the Allsvenskan history – on 3 August 2013 he scored a goal in a 1–0 win against Syrianska FC at the age of 16 years and 1 month.

In January 2023 he signed for Greek club Levadiakos. He returned to Sweden and signed for Landskrona BoIS in March 2024.

== Personal life ==
Sachpekidis is of Greek descent and is a PAOK fan.
