= Fortuné Oré =

Beninese footballer

Personal information
- Full name: Fortuné Willis Oré
- Date of birth: 26 October 1997 (age 29)
- Height: 1.83 m (6 ft 0 in)
- Position: Left-back

Senior career*
Years	Team	Apps	(Gls)
–2013	AS Oussou Saka		
2013–2014	USS Kraké		
2014–2017	AS Police		
2017–2018	US Goélands		
2018–2019	US Raon-l'Étape	6	(0)
2019–2022	Vannes B		

International career
2014	Benin	6	(0)
- * Club domestic league appearances and goals

Fortuné Willis Oré (born 26 October 1997) is a Beninese former professional footballer who plays as a left-back. In 2014, he made six appearances for the Benin national team.

== Career ==
Oré joined USS Kraké in December 2013. He was called up to the Benin under-20 national team for the 2015 African U-20 Championship qualification and played against Congo on 11 May 2004.
