= Orlande Kpassa =

Ivorian footballer (born 1997)

Personal information
- Full name: Orlande Kpassa Lago Liade
- Date of birth: 7 May 1997 (age 29)
- Place of birth: Abidjan, Ivory Coast
- Height: 1.85 m (6 ft 1 in)
- Position: Forward

Team information
- Current team: Polonia Golina
- Number: 18

Youth career
- 2005–2010: Pepitre Abidjan
- RFC Yamoussoukro

Senior career*
Years	Team	Apps	(Gls)
2014	Phattalung		
2015	Pattani	18	(12)
2016–2017	Stolem Gniewino	14	(8)
2017–2018	Bytovia Bytów	13	(1)
2018–2020	Lubuszanin Trzcianka	44	(23)
2020	Huragan Morąg	17	(1)
2021	Noteć Czarnków	17	(9)
2021–2022	Górnik Konin	26	(3)
2022–2023	Victoria Września	15	(1)
2023–	Polonia Golina	55	(25)
- * Club domestic league appearances and goals as of 09:07, 23 June 2025 (UTC)

Orlande Kpassa Lago Liade (born 7 May 1997) is an Ivorian professional footballer who plays as a forward for Polish club Polonia Golina.

== Career statistics ==
As of match played 14 June 2025.

Appearances and goals by club, season and competition
Club	Season	League			National cup (Note: Includes Polish Cup)		Continental		Other		Total	
Club	Season	Division	Apps	Goals	Apps	Goals	Apps	Goals	Apps	Goals	Apps	Goals
Pattani	2015	Regional League Division 2	18	12	0	0	—		0	0	18	12
Stolem Gniewino	2015–16	IV liga Pomerania	14	8	—		—		—		14	8
Bytovia Bytów	2017–18	I liga	13	1	4	0	—		—		17	1
Lubuszanin Trzcianka	2018–19	IV liga Greater Poland	32	18	—		—		—		32	18
Lubuszanin Trzcianka	2019–20	IV liga Greater Poland	12	5	—		—		—		12	5
Lubuszanin Trzcianka	Total		44	23	—		—		—		74	23
Huragan Morąg	2020–21	III liga, gr. I	17	1	—		—		—		17	1
Noteć Czarnków	2020–21	V liga Greater Poland I	17	9	—		—		—		17	9
Górnik Konin	2021–22	IV liga Greater Poland	26	3	—		—		—		26	3
Victoria Września	2022–23	IV liga Greater Poland	15	1	—		—		—		15	1
Polonia Golina	2023–24	V liga Greater Poland II	22	22	—		—		2 (Note: Appearances in IV liga promotion/relegation play-offs)	0	24	22
Polonia Golina	2024–25	IV liga Greater Poland	31	3	—		—		—		31	3
Polonia Golina	Total		53	25	—		—		2	0	55	25
Career total			217	73	4	0	0	0	2	0	223	73

== Honours ==
Lubuszanin Trzcianka

- Polish Cup (Piła regionals): 2018–19
