= Connor Ellis =

UK-born Irish professional footballer

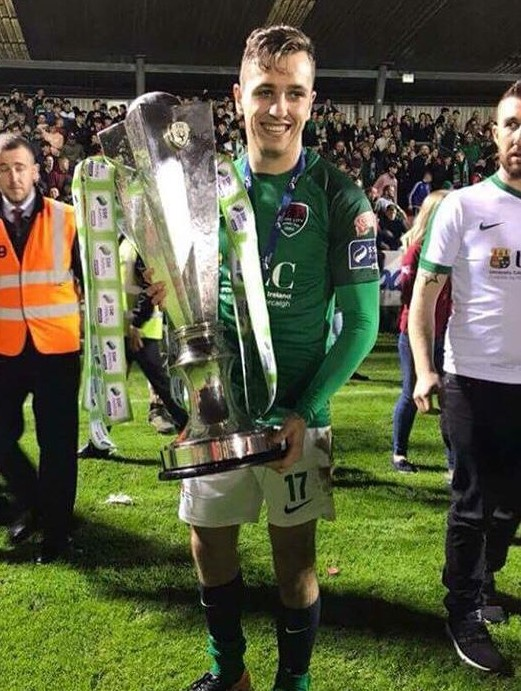
- Connor Ellis of Cork City with the Premier Division trophy in 2017

Personal information
- Date of birth: 12 May 1997 (age 29)
- Place of birth: Birmingham, England
- Position: Forward

Youth career
- 2009-2013: Bantry Bay Rovers
- 2013-2016: Cork City

Senior career*
Years	Team	Apps	(Gls)
2015–2017	Cork City	21	(2)
2016	→ Cobh Ramblers (loan)	12	(5)
2018-2019	Limerick	39	(8)

International career
2012	Republic of Ireland U15	2	(0)
2013	Republic of Ireland U17	2	(0)
2015	Republic of Ireland U18	2	(1)
2015	Republic of Ireland Schools	5	(3)
2015	Republic of Ireland U19	2	(0)
- * Club domestic league appearances and goals

Connor Ellis (born 12 May 1997) is a former professional footballer.

A former youth international for the Republic of Ireland, he previously played for Cork City where he was part of their League of Ireland Premier Division and FAI Cup double-winning team of 2017.

== Club career ==
=== Early career ===
Born in Birmingham, England, Ellis moved to Cork, Ireland at the age of 12 and played at underage level for his local club Bantry Bay Rovers.

=== Cork City U19s ===
Ellis was spotted by Cork City and signed for their Under-19 squad in October 2013, aged 16. Ellis scored his first competitive goal against Drogheda United in Bishopstown the following month and would go on to be prolific at Under-19 level, scoring 46 times in 51 games.

In his first season, 2013/14, he scored 11 goals, including his first hat-trick for Cork in a 6–0 win over UCD in February 2014. In April 2015, he was named in the League of Ireland Under-19 Team of the Year. It was a 2014/15 season where Ellis had scored 16 goals in 18 games.

Ellis scored 14 goals in just 15 games in a shortened 2015 season, which ended with Cork lifting the Under-19 National League trophy after defeating Limerick in the final at the Markets Field. Ellis scored and was awarded the official Man of the Match award in the decider.

The Under-19 2016 season coincided with Ellis' educational commitments as he focussed on his Leaving Certificate, but he still managed to score five goals in five appearances, before making a loan move to Cobh Ramblers.

=== Cork City ===
On 18 July 2015, Ellis made his first-team debut for Cork City when coming off the bench in a 4–1 win at Longford Town. On 21 July 2015, Ellis was allocated a first-team squad number (17) for the first time.

On 12 July 2016, Cork rewarded Ellis for his performances with his first professional contract at the club. Cork manager John Caulfield remarked: "Connor is one of our bright lights, we have great time for him. He has great attributes; he has his feet on the ground and he is working really hard to make the step up and he is showing all the hallmarks that he can do so."

==== Cobh Ramblers (Loan) ====
To gain senior experience, Ellis was sent on-loan to First Division Cork-based side Cobh Ramblers on 22 July 2016. He struck four goals in 10 league appearances as he helped Ramblers to the First Division promotion playoffs. Ellis also scored in the playoffs against Drogheda United, but Cobh lost the tie. In the FAI Cup, Ellis netted two goals in two appearances for Ramblers, including in their defeat at top-flight Saint Patrick's Athletic.

=== Cork City ===
For the 2017 season, Ellis returned to Cork City. In the season's curtain-raiser, the President's Cup final, he played in a 3–0 win over 2016 double-winners Dundalk. Due to the scintillating form of future Republic of Ireland and Preston North End striker Sean Maguire, then 19-year-old Ellis was used mainly as a substitute – totalling 17 league appearances from the bench.

He was part of the matchday squad for all four of Cork's UEFA Europa League games, in ties against Levadia Tallinn (Estonia) and AEK Larnaca (Cyprus). Ellis scored on his only FAI Cup start that year, twice in a 7–0 win over Athlone Town. Cork went on to win the country's national cup competition on penalties against Dundalk. Overall that year – as Cork claimed the Premier Division and FAI Cup double – Ellis scored five goals from limited minutes in 26 appearances in all competitions.

=== Limerick ===
Having attracted interest from a number of clubs, Ellis – in search of more regular first-team football – opted to sign for another Premier Division club, Limerick F.C., on a two-year contract in January 2018. While only signing the deal in January, Ellis had caught the attention of former Newcastle United and Everton defender Neil McDonald, who had left Limerick in the intervening period to take up a coaching position in the UK.

Ellis made his league debut for Limerick against Bohemians at the Markets Field on 24 February 2018. Troubled by a hip injury early in the campaign, the striker returned from the midseason break in excellent form and scored his first club goal against Derry City at The Brandywell Stadium on 6 July. He also netted an important goal in a win over Bray Wanderers on 21 September to seal Limerick's place in the playoffs. There, they lost to Finn Harps, which saw the club demoted to the First Division.

Despite offers to remain in the top flight, Ellis stayed with Limerick to aid their promotion push. He scored six goals and won the supporters' club Player of the Month for March, before the club's well-documented financial crisis forced Ellis to depart

== International career ==
Ellis has represented the Republic of Ireland at Under-15, Under-17, Under-18 and Under-19 level, as well as Under-18 Schoolboys. In June 2015, Ellis scored in a 1–0 win for the Irish Under-18s just six minutes after coming off the bench against Luxembourg. In March 2016, Ellis was honoured with the prestigious FAI Schools International Player of the Year award. The award had come after Ellis had helped Ireland to win the 2015 Centenary Shield. The striker scored twice in the 3–2 win over Northern Ireland and also netted a goal in the 1–1 draw away to Scotland. The three winners of the award prior to Ellis were Alan Browne, Sean Maguire and Ryan Manning.

== Career statistics ==
As of 30 June 2019

Appearances and goals by club, season and competition
Club	Season	League			National Cup		League Cup		Other		Total	
Club	Season	Division	Apps	Goals	Apps	Goals	Apps	Goals	Apps	Goals	Apps	Goals
Cork City	2017	2017 Premier Division	20	2	2	2	3	1	1	0	26	5
Cork City	2016	2016 Premier Division	0	0	0	0	0	0	0	0	0	0
Cork City	2015	2015 Premier Division	1	0	0	0	0	0	0	0	1	0
Total			21	2	2	2	3	1	1	0	27	5
Cobh Ramblers (loan)	2016	2016 First Division	12	5	2	2	0	0	0	0	14	7
Total			12	5	2	2	0	0	0	0	14	7
Limerick	2019	2019 First Division	15	6	0	0	1	0	0	0	16	6
Limerick	2018	2018 Premier Division	24	2	2	1	1	0	0	0	27	3
Limerick	Total		39	8	2	1	2	0	0	0	43	9
Career total			72	15	6	5	5	1	1	0	84	21

== Honours ==
League of Ireland: 1

- Cork City – 2017

FAI Cup: 1

- Cork City – 2017

President's Cup: 1

- Cork City – 2017

Munster Senior Cup: 1

- Cork City – 2017

Individual

- Republic of Ireland Under-18 Schools International Player of the Year: 2015
