= Fabian (footballer) =

Brazilian footballer (born 1997)

Personal information
- Full name: Fabian Maria Lago Vilela de Abreu
- Date of birth: 24 October 1997 (age 29)
- Place of birth: Rio de Janeiro, Brazil
- Height: 1.83 m (6 ft 0 in)
- Position: Centre-back

Youth career
- 2010–2017: Avaí

Senior career*
Years	Team	Apps	(Gls)
2017–2019	Avaí	0	(0)
2018	→ Almirante Barroso (loan)		
2019	→ Rio Branco (loan)	0	(0)
2019–2020	Dordrecht	24	(3)
2021–2022	Gnistan	51	(6)
- * Club domestic league appearances and goals as of 8 October 2022

Fabian Maria Lago Vilela de Abreu (born 24 October 1997), commonly known as Fabian, is a Brazilian footballer who plays as a defender.

== Career statistics ==
=== Club ===
As of 16 November 2019.

Club	Season	League			State League		Cup		Continental		Other		Total	
Club	Season	Division	Apps	Goals	Apps	Goals	Apps	Goals	Apps	Goals	Apps	Goals	Apps	Goals
Avaí	2017	Série A	0	0	0	0	0	0	–		0	0	0	0
Avaí	2018	Série B	0	0	1 (Note: Appearances in the Campeonato Catarinense)	0	0	0	–		0	0	1	0
Avaí	2019	Série A	0	0	0	0	0	0	–		0	0	0	0
Avaí	Total		0	0	1	0	0	0	0	0	0	0	1	0
Rio Branco (loan)	2019	–			5 (Note: Appearances in the Campeonato Capixaba)	0	0	0	–		0	0	5	0
Dordrecht	2019–20	Eerste Divisie	15	3	–		1 (Note: Appearances in the KNVB Cup)	0	–		0	0	16	3
Career total			15	3	6	0	1	0	0	0	0	0	22	3
