= 1. FC Bruchsal =

German football club

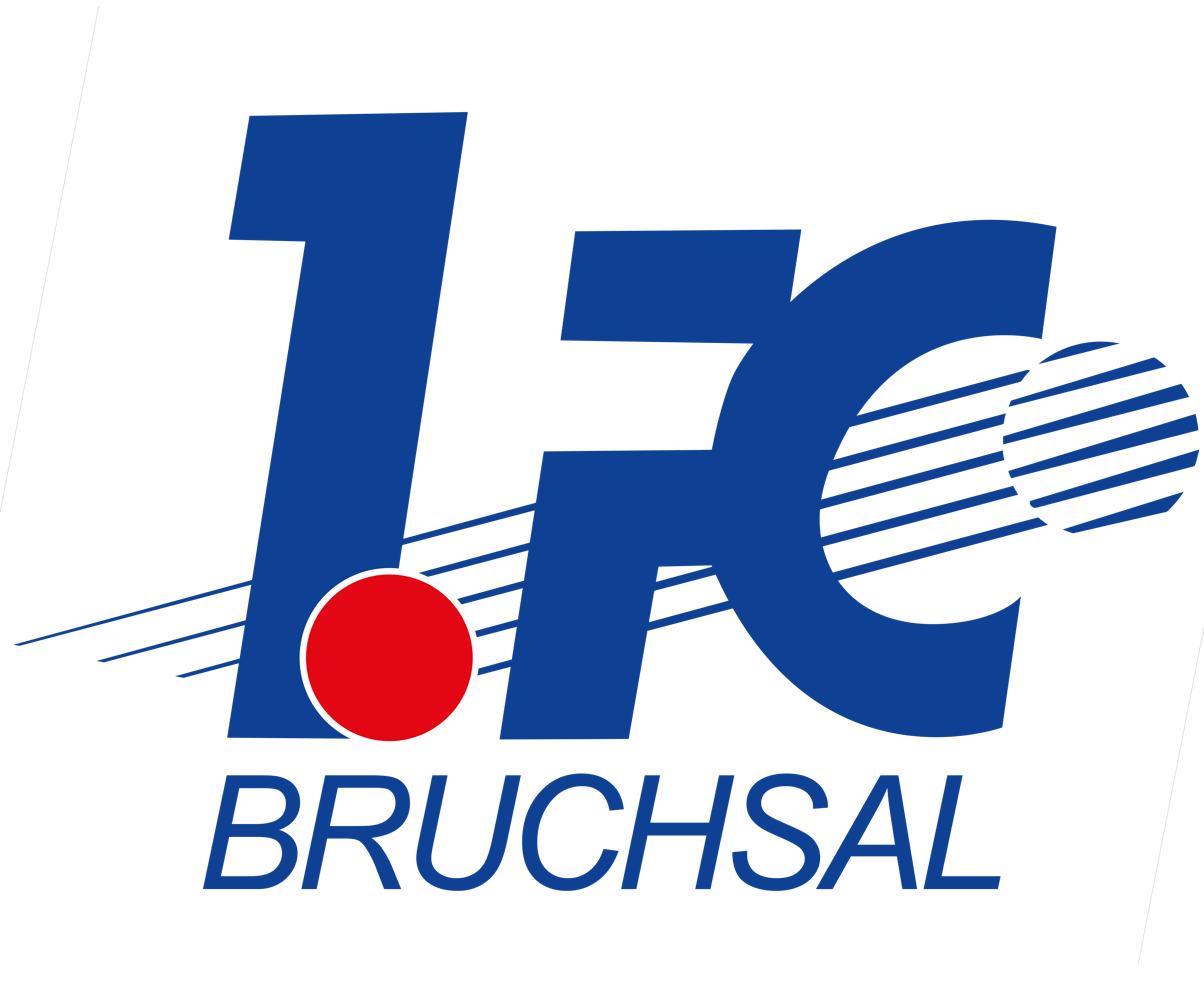
- Full name: 1. Fußballclub Bruchsal von 1899 e.V.
- Founded: 10 July 1899
- Ground: Städtisches Stadion
- Chairman: Michael Grub
- Manager: vacant
- League: Verbandsliga Baden (V
- 2015–16: 8th
Home colours	Away colours

1. FC Bruchsal is a German association football club from the town of Bruchsal, Baden-Württemberg. The club's greatest success has been promotion to the tier five Oberliga Baden-Württemberg in 2013 but it was relegated after only one season at this level.

== History ==
The club was formed as Fußballclub 1899 Bruchsal on 10 July 1899. The early years of football in Bruchsal see quite a number of other clubs being established and disestablished, with Fußballclub 1899 Bruchsal merging in 1906 with FV 1900 Bruchsal to form Bruchsaler Fußballvereinigung 1906. The club played as high as the A-Klasse, the second highest league in Baden at the time. In 1935 the club merged with Frankonia Bruchsal to form VfB 1899 Bruchsal with the new club being able to play football until 1943 when the events of the Second World War stopped play for the club.

In post war football VfB played mostly in the tier four 2. Amateurliga. After a long stint at this level the club declined in the late 1970s, dropping as far as the B-Klasse. A merger with local rival TSV 08 Bruchsal, playing in the same league under similar circumstances was however rejected by the members in a vote. The club continued to struggle in the early 1980s but another merger, now with DJK Bruchsal, was again rejected in 1981. The club improved after this, climbing up through the league system again to reach the tier six Bezirksliga. In 1991 another merger attempt with TSV 08 Bruchsal was made and, this time, was successful, with the 1. FC Bruchsal being formed on 1 August 1991.

The club's rise in the league system began in 2005 when it finished runners-up in the Kreisliga Bruchsal and earned promotion to the Landesliga Mittelbaden. Bruchsal played the next five seasons in this league, finishing in mid-table until a league championship in 2010 allowed it to move up to the tier six Verbandsliga.

In the Verbandsliga Baden the club played the first two seasons as a mid-table side finishing ninth and tenth. In 2012–13 Bruchsal won the league and earned promotion to the Oberliga Baden-Württemberg for the first time. It lasted for only one season at this level, finishing second-last and being relegated to the Verbandsliga again.

== Honours ==
The club's honours:

- Verbandsliga Baden (VI)
  - Champions: 2013
- Landesliga Mittelbaden (VII)
  - Champions: 2010

== Recent seasons ==
The recent season-by-season performance of the club:

Season	Division	Tier	Position
2003–04	Bezirksliga Bruchsal	VII	2nd
2004–05	Kreisliga Bruchsal	VII	2nd ↑
2005–06	Landesliga Mittelbaden	VI	12th
2006–07	Landesliga Mittelbaden	VI	6th
2007–08	Landesliga Mittelbaden	VI	6th
2008–09	Landesliga Mittelbaden	VII	7th
2009–10	Landesliga Mittelbaden	VII	1st ↑
2010–11	Verbandsliga Baden	VI	9th
2011–12	Verbandsliga Baden	VI	10th
2012–13	Verbandsliga Baden	VI	1st ↑
2013–14	Oberliga Baden-Württemberg	V	17th ↓
2014–15	Verbandsliga Baden	VI	6th
2015–16	Verbandsliga Baden	VI	8th
2016–17	Verbandsliga Baden	VI	

- With the introduction of the Regionalligas in 1994 and the 3. Liga in 2008 as the new third tier, below the 2. Bundesliga, all leagues below dropped one tier.

↑ Promoted	↓ Relegated
