= Hamidou Bojang =

Gambian international footballer

Personal information
- Date of birth: 1 January 1997 (age 29)
- Place of birth: Brikama, Gambia
- Height: 1.76 m (5 ft 9 1/2 in)
- Position: Defender

Team information
- Current team: ASC Linguère

Senior career*
Years	Team	Apps	(Gls)
2014–2016	Brikama United		
2016–	ASC Linguère		

International career^{‡}
2016–	Gambia	1	(0)
- * Club domestic league appearances and goals as of 12:23, 2 March 2018 (UTC) ‡ National team caps and goals as of 12:23, 2 March 2018 (UTC)

Hamidou Bojang (born 1 January 1997) is a Gambian international footballer who plays for ASC Linguère, as a defender.

== Career ==
Born in Brikama, he has played club football for Brikama United and ASC Linguère.

He made his international debut for Gambia in 2016.
