= Laurent Lopes =

French Guianan footballer (born 1997)

Personal information
- Full name: Laurent Sebastien Lopes de Matos
- Date of birth: 7 March 1997 (age 29)
- Place of birth: Kourou, French Guiana
- Height: 1.64 m (5 ft 5 in)
- Positions: Right-back; right midfielder

Youth career
- –2017: Bordeaux
- 2016–2017: → Bassin d'Arcachon (youth loan)

Senior career*
Years	Team	Apps	(Gls)
2017–2018	San Roque Lepe	24	(1)
2018	Ciudad Lucena	7	(0)
2019	Écija Balompié	16	(5)
2019–2020	Gerena	8	(0)
2020	Lanzarote		
2021	Plasencia	5	(1)
2022	ŁKS Łagów	0	(0)

International career
2018	French Guiana	1	(0)
- * Club domestic league appearances and goals

Laurent Sebastien Lopes de Matos (born 7 March 1997) is a retired French Guianan professional footballer who played as a right-back or right midfielder.

== Career statistics ==
=== Club ===
As of 6 March 2022

Club	Season	League			Cup		Other		Total	
Club	Season	Division	Apps	Goals	Apps	Goals	Apps	Goals	Apps	Goals
San Roque Lepe	2017–18	Tercera División	24	1	0	0	0	0	24	1
Ciudad Lucena	2018–19	Tercera División	7	0	0	0	0	0	7	0
Écija Balompié	2018–19	Tercera División	16	5	0	0	0	0	16	5
Gerena	2019–20	Tercera División	8	0	0	0	0	0	8	0
Plasencia	2021–22	Tercera División RFEF	5	1	0	0	0	0	5	1
Career total			60	7	0	0	0	0	60	7

=== International ===
As of matches played 17 December 2018.

National team	Year	Apps	Goals
French Guiana	2018	1	0
Total		1	0
