= Charles (footballer, born 1997) =

Brazilian footballer

Personal information
- Full name: José Charles Soares Matos
- Date of birth: 2 July 1997 (age 29)
- Place of birth: Barbalha, Brazil
- Position: Centre back

Team information
- Current team: Barbalha

Youth career
- Icasa
- 2015–2016: Grêmio

Senior career*
Years	Team	Apps	(Gls)
2014–2015	Icasa	17	(1)
2017	Botafogo-PB	0	(0)
2017	Rio Claro	0	(0)
2017–2019	Santos	0	(0)
2020	Guarani de Juazeiro	7	(0)
2021–	Barbalha	4	(0)
- * Club domestic league appearances and goals as of 20:36, 11 April 2021 (UTC)

José Charles Soares Matos (born 2 July 1997), known as Charles, is a Brazilian footballer who plays as a central defender for Barbalha.

== Club career ==
Born in Barbalha, Ceará, Charles was an Icasa youth graduate. After appearing with the first team in the Taça Fares Lopes, he made his professional debut on 29 November 2014 by starting in a 3–2 Série B home win against Boa Esporte, as his side was already relegated.

Charles became a regular starter during the 2015 season, being elected the best player in his position of the year's Campeonato Cearense. On 28 August, he signed with Grêmio until 2017, being initially assigned to the under-20 squad.

Charles moved to Botafogo-PB in 2017. After an unassuming spell with Rio Claro, he agreed to a three-year deal with Santos on 6 October of that year, being initially assigned to the B-team.

== Career statistics ==
As of 11 April 2021

Club	Season	League			State League		Cup		Continental		Other		Total	
Club	Season	Division	Apps	Goals	Apps	Goals	Apps	Goals	Apps	Goals	Apps	Goals	Apps	Goals
Icasa	2014	Série B	1	0	—		0	0	—		2 (Note: Appearance(s) in Taça Fares Lopes)	0	3	0
Icasa	2015	Série C	2	0	14	1	2	0	—		—		18	1
Icasa	Subtotal		3	0	14	1	2	0	—		2	0	21	1
Botafogo-PB	2017	Série C	0	0	0	0	—		—		0	0	0	0
Rio Claro	2017	Paulista A2	—		—		—		—		0	0	0	0
Santos	2017	Série A	0	0	—		—		—		0	0	0	0
Guarani de Juazeiro	2020	Cearense Série B	—		7	0	—		—		—		7	0
Barbalha	2021	Cearense	—		4	0	—		—		—		4	0
Career total			3	0	25	1	2	0	0	0	2	0	32	1

== Honours ==
Icasa

- Taça Fares Lopes: 2014

Botafogo-PB

- Campeonato Paraibano: 2017
