= Luis Corredor =

Venezuelan footballer (born 1997)

Personal information
- Full name: Luis Felipe Corredor Ramos
- Date of birth: 23 September 1997 (age 29)
- Place of birth: Maracay, Venezuela
- Height: 1.87 m (6 ft 2 in)
- Position: Goalkeeper

Team information
- Current team: Rayo Zuliano
- Number: 1

Senior career*
Years	Team	Apps	(Gls)
2016–2018	Aragua	1	(0)
2018–2019	Angostura		
2019–2023	Zulia	20	(0)
2023–	Rayo Zuliano	11	(0)
- * Club domestic league appearances and goals as of 22 August 2023

Luis Felipe Corredor Ramos (born 23 September 1997) is a Venezuelan footballer who plays as a goalkeeper for Rayo Zuliano in the Venezuelan Primera División.

== Career ==
=== Club ===
In 2018, after spending his youth career with Aragua, Corredor moved to Angostura.

=== International ===
In August 2015, Corredor received a call-up to the Venezuela U20 team.
