= Rohey Malick Lowe =

Gambian politician

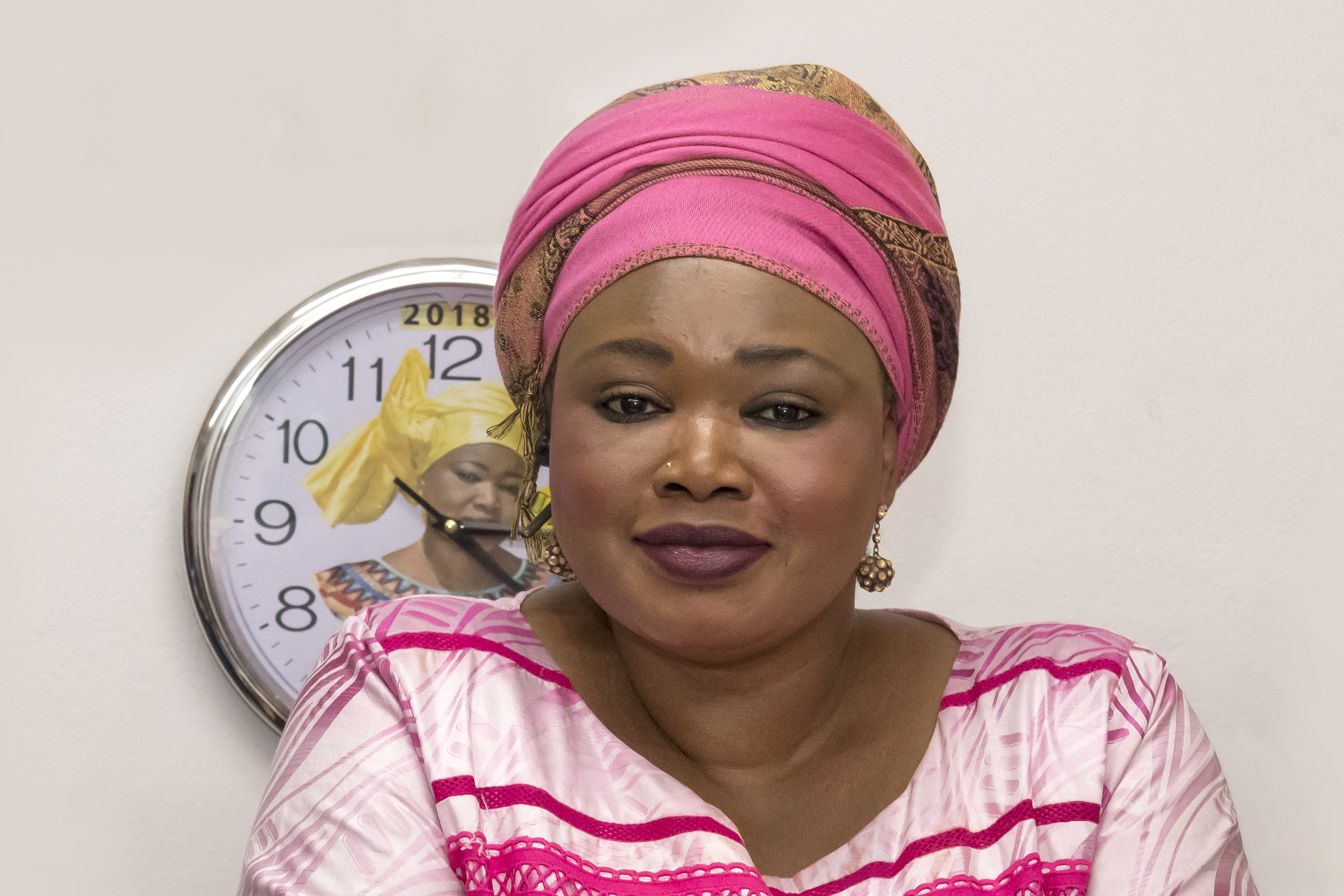
- President: Adam Barrow
- Preceded by: Abdoulie Bah

Mayor of Banjul
- Incumbent
- Assumed office May 2018

Personal details
- Born: 19 December 1971 (age 54) Banjul, Gambia
- Party: United Democratic Party
- Spouse: Mboge Saidykhan
- Education: University of Falun

Rohey Malick Lowe (born 19 December 1971) is a Gambian politician who has served as the capital city Banjul's mayor since May 2018. She is the first woman elected to the position.

== Early life and education ==
Rohey Malick Lowe was born on 19 December 1971 in Banjul, then known as Bathurst. Her father, Alhagie Malick Lowe, was mayor of Banjul from 1981 to 1983. She attended St Joseph's High School. In 2012, she moved to Europe and studied International relations at the University of Falun in Sweden.

== Career ==
Lowe worked as a food and beverage controller in a number of hotels before setting up her own business, "Wa Kerr Rohey", supplying the hotel industry with cleaning materials. She became a member of the Social Democrats while living and studying in Sweden and served on the Child Welfare Committee of Nyköping Municipality.

== Political career ==
Lowe returned to The Gambia in 2017 and was a founding member of the United Democratic Party. She was selected as the UDP candidate for mayor of Banjul and in her campaign spoke of a "twenty two year neglect" of the city that was "in bad shape."

=== Mayor of Banjul ===
Lowe was elected mayor of Banjul on 12 May 2018, the first female to hold the position since the establishment of the city in 1816. The polls were the first mayoral election since the ouster of President Yahya Jammeh in December 2016. Lowe defeated eight other candidates including incumbent Abdoulie Bah and another woman, Lizzie Eunson, a banker who ran as an Independent. The Independent Electoral Commission certified the result, describing the election as free, fair and transparent, despite low voter turnout. Lowe received 2,836 votes under UDP ticket to Bah's 2,292 and Eunson's 1,576. Lowe said her top priorities included sanitation, municipal economy and public infrastructure. In remarks at her inauguration, she said despite her being a member of a political party, "Banjul City Council will never again be an extended wing of any political party."

In December 2018, Lowe was nominated for Congress to replace Tombong Saidy, but withdrew her candidature after a lukewarm response from delegates.

In March 2019, Lowe allocated D10 million of her own money to the Rohey Malick Lowe Women's and Girls' Empowerment Initiative in cooperation with Guarantee Trust Bank in fulfillment of a campaign promise to empower the women of Banjul.

In March 2019, Freedom Newspaper reported that Lowe had been jailed in Germany in the 1980s on "alleged drug related issues", and was later involved in litigation after accusing a prison warden of sexual assault. Lowe responded by saying, "I saw the newspaper that is circulating. If the person, who wrote the story understands German, he will know that I haven't done anything wrong. I was violated. I am not going to dignify what they are saying."

== Personal life ==
Lowe married Mboge Saidykhan, a Protocol and Welfare Officer at the Embassy of Gambia in Washington DC, on 12 May 2019. She was previously divorced. Lowe is a Muslim and she speaks English, Swedish, Mandinka and Wolof.
