= Rick Sena =

Brazilian footballer

Personal information
- Full name: Rick Sena Leal Noleto
- Date of birth: 8 August 1997 (age 29)
- Place of birth: Araguaína, Brazil
- Height: 1.74 m (5 ft 8 1/2 in)
- Position: Midfielder

Team information
- Current team: Covilhã
- Number: 23

Youth career
- 2011–2017: Cruzeiro

Senior career*
| Years | Team | Apps | (Gls) |
| 2017–2018 | Marítimo B | 17 | (5) |
| 2018– | Covilhã | 6 | (0) |
- * Club domestic league appearances and goals as of 22:38, 4 April 2019 (UTC)

Rick Sena Leal Noleto (born 6 August 1997), commonly known as Rick Sena, is a Brazilian footballer who currently plays as a midfielder for Covilhã.

== Career statistics ==
=== Club ===
As of 4 April 2019.

| Club | Season | League | | | National Cup | | League Cup | | Other | | Total | |
| Club | Season | Division | Apps | Goals | Apps | Goals | Apps | Goals | Apps | Goals | Apps | Goals |
|---|---|---|---|---|---|---|---|---|---|---|---|---|
| Marítimo B | 2017–18 | Campeonato de Portugal | 17 | 5 | 0 | 0 | 0 | 0 | 0 | 0 | 17 | 5 |
| Covilhã | 2018–19 | LigaPro | 6 | 0 | 3 (Note: Appearances in the Taça de Portugal) | 1 | 0 | 0 | 0 | 0 | 9 | 1 |
| Career total | | | 23 | 5 | 3 | 1 | 0 | 0 | 0 | 0 | 26 | 6 |
