= Devaughn Williamson =

Bahamian footballer

Personal information
- Date of birth: 22 December 1997 (age 28)
- Place of birth: Bahamas
- Position: Defender

Team information
- Current team: United FC

International career
Years	Team	Apps	(Gls)
- Bahamas U23
2015–	Bahamas	1	(0)

Devaughn Williamson (born 22 December 1997) is a Bahamian footballer who plays as a defender for United FC and the Bahamas national football team.

== International career ==
In March 2015, Williamson made his debut for the Bahamas in a World Cup qualifying match against Bermuda.

== Personal life ==
Williamson was born to Philaseta and Conrad Williamson in the Bahamas. His brother Donovan is a beach soccer player, who was part of the Bahamian team that competed 2015 CONCACAF Beach Soccer Championship. Williamson is studying maritime operations at the University of the Bahamas. Devaughn and Donovan Williamson, though following different careers, had both entered the same college and were 2014 graduates of Aquinas College. Williamson took part in the Templeton World Charity Foundation Laws of Life essay competition in his time at Aguinas College Nassau.

His parents are Philaseta and Conrad Williamson.
