= Abdoulie Bah (footballer) =

Gambian footballer

Personal information
- Date of birth: 5 November 1997 (age 28)
- Place of birth: Serekunda
- Position: Midfielder

Team information
- Current team: Real de Banjul FC

Senior career*
Years	Team	Apps	(Gls)
2014–2018	Gambia Ports Authority FC		
2018–	Real de Banjul FC		

International career
2015	Gambia	1	(0)
- * Club domestic league appearances and goals

Abdoulie Bah (born 5 November 1997) is a Gambian footballer who plays as a midfielder for Real de Banjul FC.
