= Kotoko FC =

Togolese football club

Kotoko
- Full name: Kotoko F.C.
- Ground: Stade Municipal, Lavié, Togo
- Capacity: 5,000
- Chairman: François N'Djambara
- Manager: Olivier Gnonfam
Home colours	Away colours

Kotoko F.C. is a Togolese football club based in Lavié. They play in the top division in Togolese football. Their home stadium is Stade Municipal.

== Current squad ==
Note: Flags indicate national team as defined under FIFA eligibility rules; some limited exceptions apply. Players may hold more than one non-FIFA nationality.

No.	Pos.	Nation	Player
—	GK	TOG	Safiou Salifou
—	GK	GHA	Manan Hidri
—	DF	TOG	Adoyi Essofa
—	DF	TOG	Djen Dakoma
—	DF	TOG	Mahama Allaru
—	DF	TOG	Djen Dakoma
—	DF	BEN	Félicien Singbo
—	MF	NGA	Emmannuel Asiwaju Oluwaseyi

No.	Pos.	Nation	Player
—	MF	TOG	Kodjo Dadzie
—	MF	BEN	Edmé Codjo
—	MF	TOG	Sapol Saibou
—	MF	TOG	Lalawelé Mahama
—	MF	TOG	Mani Atokora
—	FW	TOG	Saani Hidri
—	FW	TOG	Hanan Giwa
