= Benin national football team =

Men's association football team

Benin
- Nickname(s): Les Guépards (The Cheetahs); Formerly: Les Ecureuils (The Squirrels)
- Association: Fédération Béninoise de Football (FBF, FEBEFOOT)
- Confederation: CAF (Africa)
- Sub-confederation: WAFU (West Africa)
- Head coach: Gernot Rohr
- Captain: Steve Mounié
- Most caps: Stéphane Sessègnon (89)
- Top scorer: Stéphane Sessègnon (24)
- Home stadium: Stade de l'Amitié
- FIFA code: BEN
First colours	Second colours

FIFA ranking
- Current: 85 ▲4 (18 November 2026)
- Highest: 59 (November–December 2009, April 2010)
- Lowest: 165 (July 1996)

First international
- Dahomey 0–1 Nigeria (Dahomey; 8 November 1959)

Biggest win
- Dahomey 7–0 Mauritania (Abidjan, Ivory Coast; 27 December 1961)

Biggest defeat
- Nigeria 10–1 Dahomey (Nigeria; 28 November 1959)

World Cup
- Appearances: 0

Africa Cup of Nations
- Appearances: 5 (first in 2004)
- Best result: Quarter-finals (2019)

The Benin national football team (French: Équipe nationale de Football du Bénin), nicknamed Les Guépards (The Cheetahs), represents Benin in men's international association football and are controlled by the Benin Football Federation. They were known as Dahomey until 1975, when the Republic of Dahomey became Benin.

Benin have been affiliated with FIFA since 1962 and are a member of the Confederation of African Football since 1969. They have never qualified for the World Cup, but have participated at five Africa Cups of Nations in 2004, 2008, 2010, 2019, and 2025 never placing in the top two in the group stage at all of these occasions. However, Benin has a unique record as the country is the first national team to reach the quarter-finals of an AFCON edition without gaining a single win in their AFCON history.

== History ==
Benin hosted its first official international match on 8 November 1959, a 1–0 loss to Nigeria. The match was played while the country was still a French dependency, prior to its independence on 1 August 1960.

Benin qualified for the 2004 Africa Cup of Nations, their first AFCON in history. However, they lost all three matches to South Africa, Morocco and again Nigeria. Benin's only goal was scored by Moussa Latoundji against Nigeria.

History repeated itself again in 2008, when Benin lost to Mali, the Ivory Coast and yet again Nigeria. They also scored only once through Razak Omotoyossi in the 4–1 defeat to the Ivory Coast.

In 2010, the Benin Football Federation's president Anjorin Moucharaf was arrested. Members of the BFF decried the imprisonment, saying that Moucharaf had been unjustly accused of fraud, leading to 12 of the 15 board members resigning in protest.

In the 2010 World Cup qualifiers, Benin topped their group in the second round. They started with a defeat to Angola but went on to win the next four matches and ensure their qualification before the final day. In the third round of the qualifiers, Benin finished second in their group, three points behind Ghana. Despite not qualifying for the 2010 FIFA World Cup, Benin's second-place finish ensured their qualification to the 2010 Africa Cup of Nations, where they drew against Mozambique to receive their first ever point at the AFCON. The Squirrels then lost their other two matches against Nigeria and defending champions Egypt to finish third in their group and fail to progress to the next round. After this performance, on 8 February 2010, the BFF, not willing to accept a group stage exit for the third time in a row, dissolved the national team and sacked coach Michel Dussuyer, as well as the rest of his staff. Dussuyer was unaware that he had been sacked and claimed that he had not done anything wrong. The team became an innocent victim of enraged African countries failing to accept defeat at major tournaments and disbanding their national teams in the early 2010s, along with Nigeria, the team that Benin have met in the group stage of all three of their AFCONs before their disbandment, which were suspended for two years by President Goodluck Jonathan after the 2010 FIFA World Cup.

In the second round of the 2014 World Cup qualifiers, Benin were placed in Group H with Algeria, Mali and Rwanda. They finished third in their group, failing to advance to the next round.

On 9 May 2016, FIFA suspended Benin for unknown reasons.

At the 2019 Africa Cup of Nations, despite advancing only as the third-best third-placed team, Benin reunited with Dussuyer, reached the quarter-finals, where they lost to eventual runners-up Senegal, with a shock win over tournament favourites Morocco on penalties.

On 6 October 2026, Benin played Argentina in a friendly at the Estadio Monumental in Buenos Aires, which was Lionel Messi's final international appearance following his retirement announcement from the national team in August 2026, losing 3-0.

== Kit history ==
=== Kit manufacturer ===
Kit providers	Period
(Germany) Adidas	1980–1991
(Germany) Puma	1992–1997
(Germany) Adidas	1998–2001
(Italy) Erreà	2002–2005
(France) Airness	2006–2014
(Burkina Faso) Tovio	2015–2018
(United Kingdom) Umbro	2019–2022
(Italy) Macron	2023–present

== Results and fixtures ==
The following is a list of match results in the last twelve months, as well as any future matches that have been scheduled.

Win Draw Loss Fixture

=== 2025 ===
18 November Friendly	Burkina Faso	3–0	Benin	Mohammedia, Morocco
17:00 UTC+1	Minoungou 25', 45+3'; Simpore 90+4'	Report		Stadium: El Bachir Stadium

23 December 2025 AFCON Group D	DR Congo	1–0	Benin	Rabat, Morocco
13:30 UTC+1	Bongonda 16'	Report		Stadium: Al Barid Stadium; Attendance: 13,073; Referee: Abongile Tom (South Africa)

27 December 2025 AFCON Group D	Benin	1–0	Botswana	Rabat, Morocco
13:30 UTC+1	Roche 28'	Report		Stadium: Rabat Olympic Stadium; Attendance: 7,462; Referee: Shamirah Nabadda (Uganda)

30 December 2025 AFCON Group D	Benin	0–3	Senegal	Tangier, Morocco
20:00 UTC+1		Report	Seck 38'; H. Diallo 62'; Koulibaly (red card) 71'; C. Ndiaye 90+7'	Stadium: Ibn Batouta Stadium; Attendance: 26,707; Referee: Samuel Uwikunda (Rwanda)

=== 2026 ===
5 January 2025 AFCON Round of 16	Egypt	3–1 (a.e.t.)	Benin	Agadir, Morocco
17:00 UTC+1	Attia 69'; Ibrahim 97'; Salah 120+4'	Report	Dossou 83'	Stadium: Adrar Stadium; Attendance: 20,191; Referee: Pierre Atcho (Gabon)

27 March Friendly	Benin	1–0	Liberia	Casablanca, Morocco
16:00 UTC+1	Tosin 85'	Report		Stadium: Père Jégo Stadium; Referee: Jalal Jayed (Morocco)

31 March Friendly	Guinea	0–1	Benin	Casablanca, Morocco
21:00 UTC+1		Report	Mounié 33'	Stadium: Larbi Zaouli Stadium; Referee: Haythem Trabelsi (Tunisia)

5 June Friendly	Benin	1–1	Niger	Casablanca, Morocco
20:00 UTC+1	Amadou 37'	Report	Sako 90+2'	Stadium: Père Jégo Stadium; Referee: Naoufal Nachite (Morocco)

9 June Friendly	Togo	5–1	Benin	Mohammedia, Morocco
19:00 UTC+1	Tijani 39' (o.g.); Komlavi 58'; Djené 68'; Denkey 74'; Laba 88'	Report	F.Santos 6'	Stadium: El Bachir Stadium; Referee: Mohamed El Baroudi (Morocco)

25 September 2027 AFCON qualification	Burkina Faso	1–1	Benin	Ouagadougou, Burkina Faso
19:00 UTC+0	Traoré 20' (pen.)	Report	Tosin 68' (pen.)	Stadium: 4 August Stadium; Referee: Omar Artan (Somalia)

29 September 2027 AFCON qualification	Benin	2–1	Mauritania	Abidjan, Ivory Coast
17:00 UTC+0	Aloko 31', 46'	Report	Koïta 80' (pen.)	Stadium: Alassane Ouattara Stadium; Referee: Messie Nkounkou (Congo)

6 October Friendly	Argentina	3–0	Benin	Buenos Aires, Argentina
20:00 UTC−3	Otamendi 48'; Paz 61'; Messi 69' (pen.)	Report		Stadium: Estadio Monumental; Attendance: 85,000; Referee: Fernando Véjar

11 November 2027 AFCON qualification	Benin	v	Central African Republic	TBD, Benin
TBD				Stadium: TBD

15 November 2027 AFCON qualification	Central African Republic	v	Burkina Faso	TBD, Central African Republic
TBD				Stadium: TBD

=== 2027 ===
24 March 2027 AFCON qualification	Benin	v	Burkina Faso	TBD, Benin
TBD				Stadium: TBD

28 March 2027 AFCON qualification	Mauritania	v	Benin	TBD, Mauritania
TBD				Stadium: TBD

== Coaching staff ==
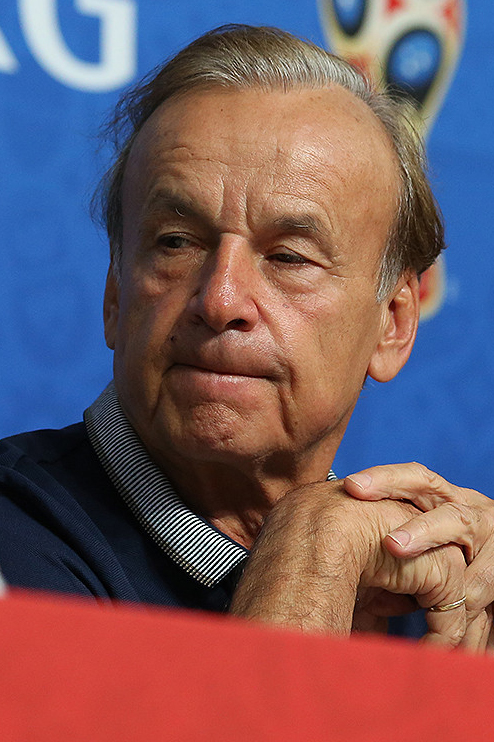
Gernot Rohr is the current manager of Benin

Position	Name
Head coach	(Germany) Gernot Rohr
Assistant coaches	(Benin) Moustapha Tchawogbé (Benin) Gervais Adjanohoun
Goalkeeping coach	(Benin) Apollinaire Gbadamassi
Fitness coach	(Benin) Ibrahim Kpadenou
Match Analyst	(Benin) Christophe Fagbohoun
Doctors	(Benin) Dr. Hervé Gbalazou (Benin) Dr. Michel Djogbenou
Physiotherapists	(Benin) Alain Gbenou (Benin) Thomas Hounkpè (Benin) Ousmane Houssou (Benin) Maxime Tchouassi
Team coordinator	(Benin) Bernard Gbedjissi
Technical director	(Benin) Mohamed Agbassi

=== Coaching history ===
- (France) Serge Devèze
- (Benin) Wabi Gomez
- (Germany) Peter Schnittger (1992)
- (Benin) Moise Ekoue (1993)
- (Ghana) Cecil Jones Attuquayefio (2003–2004)
- (France) Hervé Revelli (2004)
- (Benin) Edmé Codjo (2005–2007)
- (France) Didier Notheaux (2007)
- (Germany) Reinhard Fabisch (2007–2008)
- (France) Michel Dussuyer (2008–2010)
- (France) Jean-Marc Nobilo (2010)
- (France) Denis Goavec (2010–2011)
- (Benin) Edmé Codjo (2011–2012)
- (France) Manuel Amoros (2012–2014)
- (France) Didier Ollé-Nicolle (2014)
- (Benin) Oumar Tchomogo (2015–2017)
- (France) Michel Dussuyer (2018–2021)
- (Benin) Moussa Latoundji (2022–2023)
- (Germany) Gernot Rohr (2023–present)

== Players ==
=== Current squad ===
The following players were called up for the 2027 Africa Cup of Nations qualification matches against Burkina Faso and Mauritania on 25 and 29 September 2026, respectively and the friendly match against Argentina on 6 October 2026.

Caps and goals correct as of 5 January 2026, after the match against Egypt.

No.	Pos.	Player	Date of birth (age)	Caps	Goals	Club
1	GK	Marcel Dandjinou	25 June 1998 (age 28)	22	0	(South African Football Association) Kruger United
16	GK	Saturnin Allagbé	22 November 1993 (age 32)	46	0	(French Football Federation) Chauray
23	GK	Serge Obassa	30 June 1996 (age 30)	2	0	(Nigeria Football Federation) Kano Pillars
2	DF	Liam Omore	20 March 2003 (age 23)	1	0	(German Football Association) Würzburger Kickers
3	DF	Tamimou Ouorou	3 May 2003 (age 23)	13	0	(Bulgarian Football Union) CSKA Sofia
4	DF	Amiro Amadou	10 July 2002 (age 24)	2	1	(German Football Association) SV Babelsberg 03
5	DF	Yohan Roche	7 July 1997 (age 29)	25	2	(Hellenic Football Federation) Iraklis
12	DF	Charlemagne Azongnitode	8 August 2001 (age 25)	0	0	(Football Association of Finland) TPS
13	DF	Mohamed Tijani	10 July 1997 (age 29)	24	1	Unattached
	DF	Rachid Moumini	27 October 2004 (age 22)	20	1	(Association of Football Federations of Azerbaijan) Sumgayit
	DF	Irené Glele	28 June 1999 (age 27)	0	0	(Tunisian Football Federation) ES Métlaoui
7	MF	Mattéo Ahlinvi	2 July 1999 (age 27)	25	0	(Romanian Football Federation) Farul Constanța
8	MF	Hassane Imourane	8 April 2003 (age 23)	26	2	(Swiss Football Association) Grasshopper
15	MF	Sessi D'Almeida	20 November 1995 (age 31)	45	1	(Association of Football Federations of Azerbaijan) Neftçi
18	MF	Junior Olaitan	9 May 2002 (age 24)	38	5	(Turkish Football Federation) Beşiktaş
22	MF	Attidjikou Samadou	2 February 2004 (age 22)	9	0	(Egyptian Football Association) Smouha
	MF	Dodo Dokou	4 May 2004 (age 22)	26	2	(Portuguese Football Federation) Leixões
6	FW	Sahid Ngobi	26 March 2005 (age 21)	5	0	(Football Association of Finland) VPS
10	FW	Aiyegun Tosin	26 June 1998 (age 28)	23	4	(French Football Federation) Lorient
11	MF	Yamirou Ouorou	12 June 2006 (age 20)	1	0	(Danish Football Association) Horsens
14	FW	Olatoundji Tessilimi	18 February 1998 (age 28)	4	0	(Football Association of the Czech Republic) Dukla Prague
17	FW	Rodolfo Aloko	26 December 2006 (age 19)	7	0	(United States Soccer Federation) Charlotte
19	FW	Junior Olugbade	15 November 2006 (age 20)	2	0	(Royal Moroccan Football Federation) Wydad AC Reserve
20	FW	Jodel Dossou	17 March 1992 (age 34)	66	10	(Luxembourg Football Federation) Lorentzweiler
21	FW	Ede Oloko	10 January 2001 (age 25)	1	0	(Latvian Football Federation) Liepāja

=== Recent call-ups ===
The following players have been called up for the team within the last 12 months and are still available for selection.

Pos.	Player	Date of birth (age)	Caps	Goals	Club	Latest call-up
GK	Mariano Tchinonvi	29 July 2004 (age 22)	0	0	(Benin) Loto-Popo	v. Burkina Faso, 18 November 2025
DF	Olivier Verdon	5 October 1995 (age 31)	44	0	(Israel) Maccabi Netanya	v. Togo, 9 June 2026
DF	Rodrigue Fassinou	22 May 1999 (age 27)	16	0	(Democratic Republic of the Congo) Maniema Union	v. Togo, 9 June 2026
DF	Rabiou Sankamao	12 October 2003 (age 23)	6	0	(Benin) Coton	v. Togo, 9 June 2026
DF	David Kiki	25 November 1993 (age 32)	54	0	(Romania) Voluntari	2025 Africa Cup of Nations
DF	Jordan Lawson	7 August 2007 (age 19)	0	0	(United States) Lincoln Trail College	v. Burkina Faso, 18 November 2025
DF	Cédric Hountondji	19 January 1994 (age 32)	32	2	(Turkey) Bandırmaspor	v. Nigeria, 14 October 2025
MF	Gislain Ahoudo	2 July 1999 (age 27)	4	0	(Saudi Arabia) Al-Arabi	v. Togo, 9 June 2026
MF	Mariano Ahouangbo	16 November 2002 (age 24)	3	0	(Armenia) Gandzasar Kapan	v. Togo, 9 June 2026
MF	Rodrigue Kossi	31 December 1999 (age 26)	12	1	(Morocco) Hassania Agadir	v. Guinea, 31 March 2026
MF	Romaric Amoussou	10 December 2000 (age 25)	5	0	(Ivory Coast) ASEC Mimosas	2025 Africa Cup of Nations
MF	Salifu Ibrahim	6 June 2000 (age 26)	0	0	(Ethiopia) Wolaitta Dicha	v. Burkina Faso, 18 November 2025
FW	Razack Rachidou	22 June 2006 (age 20)	6	0	(Benin) AS Sobemap	v. Togo, 9 June 2026
FW	Prince Dossou	20 July 2006 (age 20)	4	0	(Benin) ASVO	v. Togo, 9 June 2026
FW	Felipe Santos	3 January 1997 (age 29)	0	0	(Azerbaijan) Araz-Naxçıvan	v. Togo, 9 June 2026
FW	Steve Mounié	29 September 1994 (age 32)	65	22	(Turkey) Alanyaspor	v. Guinea, 31 March 2026
FW	Michel Boni	28 March 2008 (age 18)	0	0	(England) Brentford	v. Guinea, 31 March 2026
FW	Adam Akimey	25 February 2004 (age 22)	0	0	(Sweden) Helsingborg	2025 Africa Cup of Nations
FW	Andréas Hountondji	11 July 2002 (age 24)	19	3	(Germany) FC St. Pauli	2025 Africa Cup of Nations^{PRE}
Notes: ^{PRE} = Preliminary squad/standby.

== Player records ==
As of 1 August 2026
Players in bold are still active with Benin.

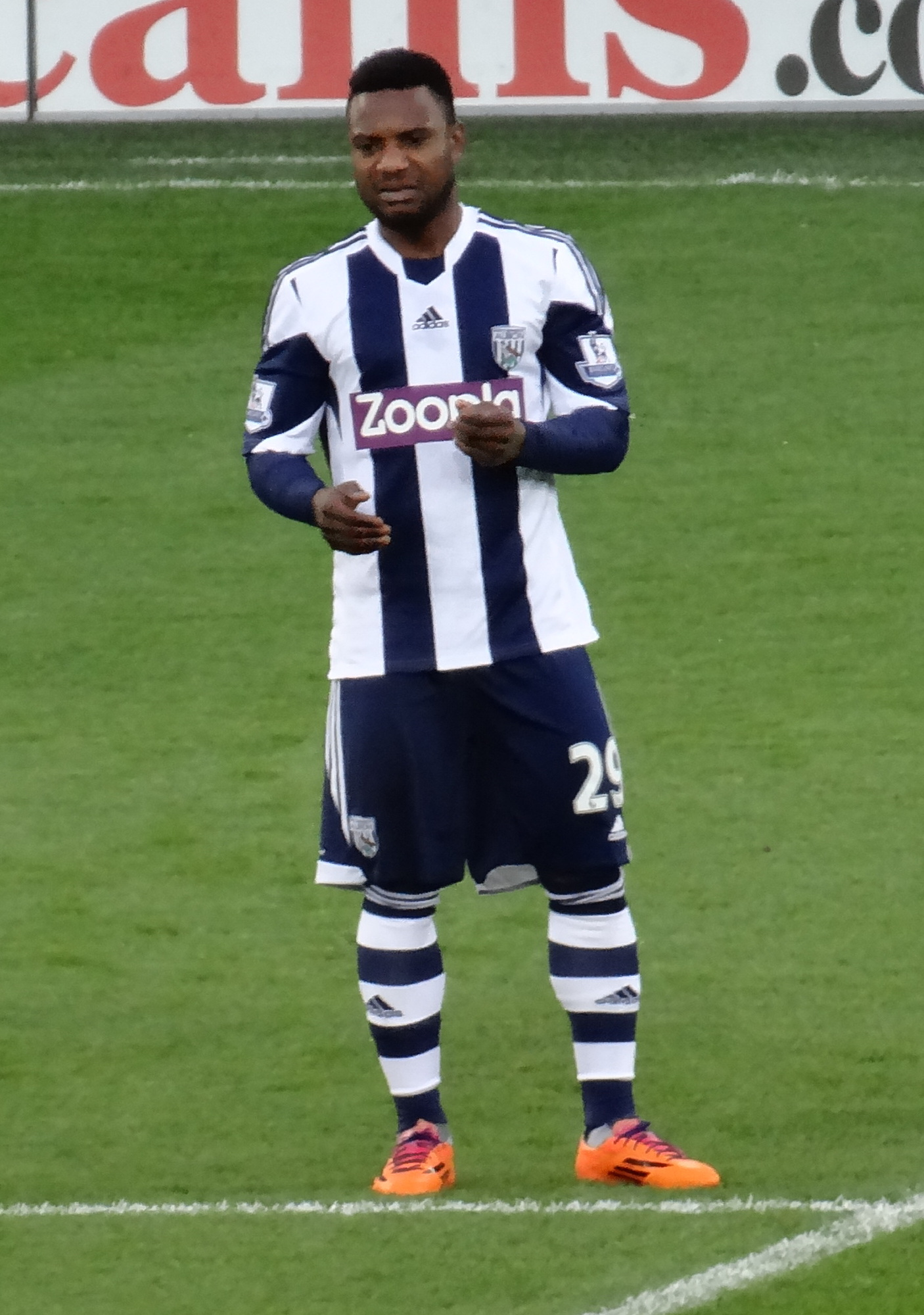
Stéphane Sessègnon is Benin's top goalscorer and their most capped player.

Most appearances
Rank	Player	Caps	Goals	Career
1	Stéphane Sessègnon	89	24	2004–2023
2	Khaled Adénon	86	2	2006–2023
3	**Jodel Dossou**	77	11	2013–present
4	**Steve Mounié**	71	23	2015–present
4	Mickaël Poté	69	10	2008–2022
6	Damien Chrysostome	58	0	2002–2011
7	**David Kiki**	56	0	2015–present
8	Jocelyn Ahouéya	55	3	2003–2013
8	Razak Omotoyossi	55	21	2004–2016
10	Romuald Boco	52	1	2004–2013

Top goalscorers
Rank	Player	Goals	Caps	Ratio	Career
1	Stéphane Sessègnon	24	89	0.27	2004–2023
2	**Steve Mounié**	23	71	0.32	2015–present
3	Razak Omotoyossi	21	55	0.38	2004–2016
4	Oumar Tchomogo	15	34	0.44	1995–2008
5	**Jodel Dossou**	11	77	0.14	2013–present
6	Mickaël Poté	10	69	0.14	2008–2022
7	Moussa Latoundji	6	21	0.29	1993–2004
7	Mouritala Ogunbiyi	6	47	0.13	1998–2019
7	Séïdath Tchomogo	6	51	0.12	2003–2014
10	Léon Bessan	5	20	0.25	1995–2007
10	**Junior Olaitan**	5	42	0.13	2021–present
10	Anicet Adjamossi	5	48	0.1	2002–2013

== Competitive record ==
=== FIFA World Cup ===
FIFA World Cup record									Qualification record					
Year	Round	Position	Pld	W	D*	L	GF	GA	Pld	W	D	L	GF	GA
(Uruguay) 1930 to (Sweden) 1958	Not a FIFA member; part of France								Not a FIFA member; part of France					
as Dahomey									as Dahomey					
(Chile) 1962	Not a FIFA member								Not a FIFA member					
(England) 1966 and (Mexico) 1970	Did not enter								Did not enter					
(West Germany) 1974	Did not qualify								2	0	0	2	1	10
as / Benin									as / Benin					
(Argentina) 1978 and (Spain) 1982	Did not enter								Did not enter					
(Mexico) 1986	Did not qualify								2	0	0	2	0	6
(Italy) 1990	Did not enter								Did not enter					
(United States) 1994	Did not qualify								6	1	0	5	3	19
(France) 1998	Did not enter								Did not enter					
(South Korea) (Japan) 2002	Did not qualify								2	0	1	1	1	2
(Germany) 2006	Did not qualify								12	2	3	7	13	26
(South Africa) 2010	Did not qualify								12	7	1	4	18	14
(Brazil) 2014	Did not qualify								6	2	2	2	8	9
(Russia) 2018	Did not qualify								2	1	0	1	2	3
(Qatar) 2022	Did not qualify								6	3	1	2	5	4
(Canada) (Mexico) (United States) 2026	Did not qualify								10	5	2	3	12	11
(Morocco) (Portugal) (Spain) 2030	To be determined													
(Saudi Arabia) 2034	To be determined													
Total	−	0/15	−	−	−	−	−	−	60	21	10	29	63	104

=== Africa Cup of Nations ===
Africa Cup of Nations record
Year	Round	Position	Pld	W	D*	L	GF	GA
(Sudan) 1957	Part of France							
(United Arab Republic) 1959	Part of France							
(Ethiopia) 1962	Not affiliated to CAF							
(Ghana) 1963	Not affiliated to CAF							
(Tunisia) 1965	Did not enter							
(Ethiopia) 1968	Did not enter							
(Sudan) 1970	Did not enter							
(Cameroon) 1972	Did not qualify							
(Egypt) 1974	Withdrew							
(Ethiopia) 1976	Withdrew							
(Ghana) 1978	Did not enter							
(Nigeria) 1980	Did not qualify							
(Libya) 1982	Did not enter							
(Ivory Coast) 1984	Did not qualify							
(Egypt) 1986	Did not qualify							
(Morocco) 1988	Did not qualify							
(Algeria) 1990	Did not qualify							
(Senegal) 1992	Did not qualify							
(Tunisia) 1994	Did not qualify							
(South Africa) 1996	Withdrew							
(Burkina Faso) 1998	Did not qualify							
(Ghana) (Nigeria) 2000	Did not qualify							
(Mali) 2002	Did not qualify							
(Tunisia) 2004	Group stage	16th	3	0	0	3	1	8
(Egypt) 2006	Did not qualify							
(Ghana) 2008	Group stage	15th	3	0	0	3	1	7
(Angola) 2010	Group stage	14th	3	0	1	2	2	5
(Equatorial Guinea) (Gabon) 2012	Did not qualify							
(South Africa) 2013	Did not qualify							
(Equatorial Guinea) 2015	Did not qualify							
(Gabon) 2017	Did not qualify							
(Egypt) 2019	Quarter-finals	8th	5	0	4	1	3	4
(Cameroon) 2021	Did not qualify							
(Ivory Coast) 2023	Did not qualify							
(Morocco) 2025	Round of 16	14th	4	1	0	3	2	7
(Kenya) (Tanzania) (Uganda) 2027	To be determined							
2028	To be determined							
Total	Quarter-finals	5/35	18	1	5	12	9	31

=== West African Nations Cup ===
West African Nations Cup record
Year	Round	Position	Pld	W	D*	L	GF	GA
(Benin) 1982	Group stage	6th	3	0	2	1	4	8
(Ivory Coast) 1983	Did not enter							
(Burkina Faso) 1984	Group stage	5th	4	0	0	4	3	9
(Ghana) 1986	Did not enter							
(Liberia) 1987	Group stage	7th	3	0	2	1	3	7
Total	Group stage	3/5	10	0	4	6	10	24

=== WAFU Nations Cup ===
WAFU Nations Cup record
Year	Round	Position	Pld	W	D*	L	GF	GA
(Nigeria) 2010	Group stage	7th	3	0	1	2	0	5
(Nigeria) 2011	Did not enter							
(Ghana) 2013	Fourth place	4th	4	0	2	2	5	6
(Ghana) 2017	Fourth place	4th	5	2	0	3	4	8
Total	Fourth place	3/4	12	2	3	7	9	19

== Honours ==
=== Regional ===
- UEMOA Tournament
  - (silver) Runners-up (1): 2013
