= 2025–26 First Professional Football League (Bulgaria) =

102nd season of top-tier football league in Bulgaria

First Professional Football League
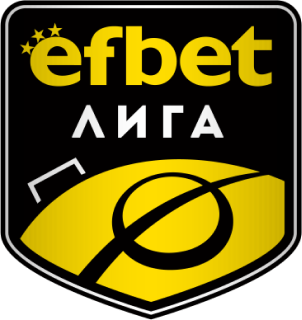
- Season: 2025–26
- Dates: 18 July 2025 – 29 May 2026
- Champions: Levski Sofia (27th title)
- Relegated: Beroe; Dobrudzha; Montana
- Champions League: Levski Sofia
- Europa League: CSKA Sofia
- Conference League: CSKA 1948; Ludogorets
- Matches: 294
- Goals: 676 (2.3 per match)
- Top goalscorer: Everton Bala; Mamadou Diallo (tied at 18 goals)
- Best goalkeeper: Anatoli Gospodinov (15 clean sheets)
- Biggest home win: Levski 7–0 Septemvri (30 November 2025)
- Biggest away win: Botev Plovdiv 0–5 Arda (4 August 2025); Lokomotiv Plovdiv 0–5 CSKA 1948 (5 March 2026)
- Highest scoring: CSKA 1948 5–4 Ludogorets (27 October 2025)
- Longest winning run: 7 games CSKA Sofia
- Longest unbeaten run: 11 games Slavia, Ludogorets
- Longest winless run: 22 games Montana
- Longest losing run: 6 games Montana
- All statistics correct as of 19:17, 29 May 2026 (UTC).

The 2025–26 First Professional Football League, also known as efbet League for sponsorship reasons, was the 102nd season of the top division of the Bulgarian football league system, the 78th since a league format was adopted for the national competition of A Group as a top tier of the pyramid, and also the 10th season of the First Professional Football League, which decides the Bulgarian champion. The season began on 18 July 2025 and ended on 29 May 2026.

Ludogorets Razgrad were the 14-time defending champions, but they were unable to defend their title. On 2 May 2026, Levski Sofia won their 27th title and first since 2009 with four games to spare after a 1–0 win over local rivals CSKA 1948.

== Overview ==
First League will be reduced from 16 to 14 teams in 2026–27, so that the teams placed 14th to 16th in the Relegation round will automatically be relegated to Second League, while the 13th place team will play a promotion/relegation playoff against the 2nd place team from Second League.

== Teams ==
Location of teams in 2025–26 First League
Location of Sofia teams in 2025–26 First League

As in the last season, 16 teams will compete in the league this year. Two teams were promoted from the 2024–25 Second League, and two places are for the winners of the promotion/relegation playoffs.

The first team to earn promotion from the Second League was Dobrudzha, who mathematically secured a top two finish after winning against Lovech on 11 May. Dobrudzha returned to the top level after a 22-year absence.

The second team to earn promotion from the Second League was Montana, who mathematically secured a top two finish after Pirin Blagoevgrad lost to Dobrudzha on 16 May. Montana returned to the top level after a 4-year absence.

Additionally, Lokomotiv Plovdiv and Botev Vratsa remained in the First League after winning against Marek and Pirin Blagoevgrad, respectively, in the promotion/relegation playoffs.

Promoted from 2024–25 Second League	Relegated from 2024–25 First League
Dobrudzha; Montana	Hebar; Krumovgrad

=== Stadiums and locations ===
Team	Location	Stadium	Capacity
Arda	Kardzhali	Arena Arda	11,114
Beroe	Stara Zagora	Stadion Beroe	12,128
Botev Plovdiv	Plovdiv	Stadion Hristo Botev	18,777
Botev Vratsa	Vratsa	Stadion Hristo Botev	8,935
Cherno More	Varna	Stadion Ticha	6,250
CSKA 1948	Bistritsa	Stadion Bistritsa	3,000
CSKA Sofia	Sofia	Vasil Levski National Stadium	43,230
Dobrudzha	Dobrich	Stadion Druzhba	12,500
Levski Sofia	Sofia	Stadion Georgi Asparuhov	17,688
Lokomotiv Plovdiv	Plovdiv	Stadion Lokomotiv	10,000
Lokomotiv Sofia	Sofia	Stadion Lokomotiv	11,200
Ludogorets	Razgrad	Huvepharma Arena	10,423
Montana	Montana	Stadion Ogosta	7,000
Septemvri Sofia	Sofia	Stadion Lokomotiv	11,200
Slavia Sofia	Sofia	Stadion Aleksandar Shalamanov	25,000
Spartak Varna	Varna	Stadion Spartak	7,000

=== Personnel and kits ===
Note: Flags indicate national team as has been defined under FIFA eligibility rules. Players and managers may hold more than one non-FIFA nationality.

Team	Manager	Captain	Kit manufacturer	Shirt sponsors	
Team	Manager	Captain	Kit manufacturer	Main	Other(s)
Arda	(Bulgaria) Aleksandar Tunchev	(Bulgaria) Anatoli Gospodinov	Uhlsport	efbet	List: Side: None; Back: IK Nataliya Ltd.; Sleeves: None; Shorts: None; Socks: None
Beroe	(Spain) Josu Uribe	(Argentina) Juan Salomoni	Nike	8888.bg	List: Side: None; Back: None; Sleeves: None; Shorts: None; Socks: None
Botev Plovdiv	(Bulgaria) Stanislav Genchev	(Bulgaria) Todor Nedelev	Macron	WinBet	List: Side: None; Back: DallBogg, PIMK; Sleeves: UG Market Trader; Shorts: None; Socks: None
Botev Vratsa	(Bulgaria) Todor Simov	(Bulgaria) Daniel Genov	Erima	WinBet	List: Side: None; Back: None; Sleeves: None; Shorts: None; Socks: None
Cherno More	(Bulgaria) Ilian Iliev	(Bulgaria) Vasil Panayotov	Macron	Armeets	List: Side: None; Back: None; Sleeves: Planex; Shorts: None; Socks: None
CSKA 1948	(Bulgaria) Aleksandar Aleksandrov	(Bolivia) Diego Medina	Jako	efbet	List: Side: None; Back: Bachkovo; Sleeves: BET.bg; Shorts: efbet; Socks: BET.bg
CSKA Sofia	(Bulgaria) Hristo Yanev	(Bulgaria) Ivan Turitsov	Macron	WinBet	List: Side: None; Back: A1 Bulgaria; Sleeves: None; Shorts: None; Socks: None
Dobrudzha	Vacant	(Bulgaria) Ventsislav Kerchev	Adidas	Bethub	List: Side: None; Back: Dobrich Municipality; Sleeves: None; Shorts: None; Socks: None
Levski Sofia	(Spain) Julio Velázquez	(Bulgaria) Georgi Kostadinov	Adidas	PalmsBet	List: Side: None; Back: Palms Sport; Sleeves: None; Shorts: None; Socks: None
Lokomotiv Plovdiv	(Slovenia) Dušan Kosič	(Tajikistan) Parvizdzhon Umarbayev	Joma	WinBet	List: Side: None; Back: General Broker Club; Sleeves: None; Shorts: None; Socks: None
Lokomotiv Sofia	(Bulgaria) Aleksandar Georgiev	(Bulgaria) Krasimir Stanoev	Macron	8888.bg	List: Side: None; Back: VIA 2000; Sleeves: None; Shorts: None; Socks: None
Ludogorets	(Norway) Per-Mathias Høgmo	(Bulgaria) Anton Nedyalkov	Jako	efbet	List: Side: None; Back: Vivacom, Huvepharma; Sleeves: Navibulgar; Shorts: MaxAmaze; Socks: None
Montana	(Bulgaria) Atanas Atanasov	(Bulgaria) Vasil Simeonov	Jako	efbet	List: Side: None; Back: None; Sleeves: None; Shorts: efbet; Socks: None
Septemvri Sofia	(Bulgaria) Hristo Arangelov	(Bulgaria) Galin Ivanov	Uhlsport	8888.bg	List: Side: None; Back: None; Sleeves: None; Shorts: None; Socks: None
Slavia Sofia	(Serbia) Ratko Dostanić	(Bulgaria) Ivan Minchev	Joma	bet365	List: Side: None; Back: Asset Insurance; Sleeves: None; Shorts: None; Socks: None
Spartak Varna	(North Macedonia) Gjoko Hadžievski	(Bulgaria) Deyan Lozev	Nike	efbet	List: Side: None; Back: None; Sleeves: 100 Tona Fitness Center; Shorts: PRIMEGEAR; Socks: None

Note: Individual clubs may wear jerseys with advertising. However, only one sponsorship is permitted per jersey for official tournaments organised by UEFA in addition to that of the kit manufacturer (exceptions are made for non-profit organisations). Clubs in the domestic league can have more than one sponsorship per jersey which can feature on the front of the shirt, incorporated with the main sponsor or in place of it; or on the back, either below the squad number or on the collar area. Shorts also have space available for advertisement.

=== Managerial changes ===
Team	Outgoing manager	Manner of departure	Date of vacancy	Position in table	Incoming manager	Date of appointment
Botev Plovdiv	(Bosnia and Herzegovina) Dušan Kerkez	Resigned	26 May 2025	Pre-season	(Bulgaria) Nikolay Kirov	28 June 2025
Lokomotiv Sofia	(Serbia) Ratko Dostanić	Mutual agreement	29 May 2025	Pre-season	(Bulgaria) Stanislav Genchev	30 May 2025
CSKA Sofia	(Bulgaria) Aleksandar Tomash	End of contract	31 May 2025	Pre-season	(Bosnia and Herzegovina) Dušan Kerkez	4 June 2025
Spartak Varna	(Bulgaria) Nikolay Kirov	End of contract	31 May 2025	Pre-season	(North Macedonia) Gjoko Hadžievski	9 July 2025
Septemvri Sofia	(Bulgaria) Nikolay Mitov	Resigned	1 June 2025	Pre-season	(Bulgaria) Stamen Belchev	5 June 2025
Ludogorets	(Croatia) Igor Jovićević	Mutual agreement	9 June 2025	Pre-season	(Portugal) Rui Mota	13 June 2025
Beroe	(Bulgaria) Plamen Lipenski	End of interim spell	6 July 2025	Pre-season	(Spain) Víctor Basadre	6 July 2025
Montana	(Bulgaria) Tancho Kalpakov	Resigned	9 August 2025	13th	(Bulgaria) Anatoli Nankov	11 August 2025
Beroe	(Spain) Víctor Basadre	Mutual agreement	3 September 2025	9th	(Argentina) Alejandro Sageras	3 September 2025
CSKA Sofia	(Bosnia and Herzegovina) Dušan Kerkez	Sacked	20 September 2025	12th	(Bulgaria) Valentin Iliev (caretaker)	20 September 2025
Botev Vratsa	(Bulgaria) Hristo Yanev	Mutual agreement	24 September 2025	7th	(Bulgaria) Todor Simov	24 September 2025
CSKA Sofia	(Bulgaria) Valentin Iliev (caretaker)	End of interim spell	24 September 2025	12th	(Bulgaria) Hristo Yanev	24 September 2025
Botev Plovdiv	(Bulgaria) Nikolay Kirov	Resigned	25 September 2025	14th	(Bulgaria) Ivan Tsvetanov (caretaker)	25 September 2025
Slavia Sofia	(Bulgaria) Zlatomir Zagorčić	Resigned	11 October 2025	13th	(Serbia) Ratko Dostanić	11 October 2025
Septemvri Sofia	(Bulgaria) Stamen Belchev	Resigned	28 October 2025	15th	(Bulgaria) Mladen Stoev (caretaker)	28 October 2025
Ludogorets	(Portugal) Rui Mota	Sacked	29 October 2025	4th	(Bulgaria) Todor Zhivondov (caretaker)	29 October 2025
Septemvri Sofia	(Bulgaria) Mladen Stoev (caretaker)	End of interim spell	30 October 2025	15th	(Serbia) Slavko Matić	30 October 2025
Botev Plovdiv	(Bulgaria) Ivan Tsvetanov (caretaker)	End of interim spell	17 November 2025	9th	(Bulgaria) Dimitar Dimitrov	17 November 2025
Ludogorets	(Bulgaria) Todor Zhivondov (caretaker)	End of interim spell	21 November 2025	5th	(Norway) Per-Mathias Høgmo	21 November 2025
Beroe	(Argentina) Alejandro Sageras	Sacked	24 November 2025	13th	(Bulgaria) Plamen Lipenski (caretaker)	24 November 2025
Beroe	(Bulgaria) Plamen Lipenski (caretaker)	End of interim spell	27 November 2025	13th	(Spain) Josu Uribe	27 November 2025
Montana	(Bulgaria) Anatoli Nankov	Sacked	20 December 2025	14th	(Greece) Akis Vavalis	29 December 2025
Dobrudzha	(Bulgaria) Atanas Atanasov	Mutual agreement	31 December 2025	16th	(Bulgaria) Yasen Petrov	4 January 2026
Septemvri Sofia	(Serbia) Slavko Matić	Mutual agreement	11 February 2026	16th	(Bulgaria) Hristo Arangelov	12 February 2026
CSKA 1948	(Bulgaria) Ivan Stoyanov	Resigned	12 February 2026	2nd	(Bulgaria) Aleksandar Aleksandrov	12 February 2026
Botev Plovdiv	(Bulgaria) Dimitar Dimitrov	Mutual agreement	16 February 2026	11th	(Bulgaria) Lachezar Baltanov (caretaker)	19 February 2026
Montana	(Greece) Akis Vavalis	Resigned	10 March 2026	16th	(Bulgaria) Atanas Atanasov	17 March 2026
Lokomotiv Sofia	(Bulgaria) Stanislav Genchev	Mutual agreement	28 April 2026	11th	(Bulgaria) Aleksandar Georgiev (caretaker)	28 April 2026
Dobrudzha	(Bulgaria) Yasen Petrov	Resigned	22 May 2026	15th		
Botev Plovdiv	(Bulgaria) Lachezar Baltanov (caretaker)	End of interim spell	27 May 2026	8th	(Bulgaria) Stanislav Genchev	27 May 2026

== Regular season ==
=== League table ===
Pos	Team	Pld	W	D	L	GF	GA	GD	Pts	Qualification
1	Levski Sofia	30	22	4	4	64	22	+42	70	Qualification for the Championship group
2	Ludogorets	30	17	9	4	57	20	+37	60	Qualification for the Championship group
3	CSKA 1948	30	18	5	7	50	31	+19	59	Qualification for the Championship group
4	CSKA Sofia	30	16	8	6	43	23	+20	56	Qualification for the Championship group
5	Lokomotiv Plovdiv	30	11	13	6	30	33	−3	46	Qualification for the Conference League group
6	Cherno More	30	11	11	8	33	26	+7	44 (Note: Head-to-head points: Cherno More 4; Arda 1.)	Qualification for the Conference League group
7	Arda	30	12	8	10	33	27	+6	44	Qualification for the Conference League group
8	Botev Plovdiv	30	11	7	12	40	37	+3	40	Qualification for the Conference League group
9	Slavia Sofia	30	10	9	11	36	33	+3	39	Qualification for the Relegation group
10	Botev Vratsa	30	9	11	10	24	26	−2	38	Qualification for the Relegation group
11	Lokomotiv Sofia	30	9	10	11	40	39	+1	37	Qualification for the Relegation group
12	Spartak Varna	30	5	12	13	25	50	−25	27	Qualification for the Relegation group
13	Dobrudzha	30	7	5	18	23	43	−20	26 (Note: Head-to-head goals: Dobrudzha 4; Septemvri 2.)	Qualification for the Relegation group
14	Septemvri Sofia	30	7	5	18	25	58	−33	26	Qualification for the Relegation group
15	Beroe	30	4	11	15	19	44	−25	23	Qualification for the Relegation group
16	Montana	30	3	8	19	15	45	−30	17	Qualification for the Relegation group

Source: Soccerway, Bulgarian Football
Rules for classification: 1) Points; 2) Head-to-head points; 3) Head-to-head goal difference; 4) Head-to-head goals scored; 5) Head-to-head away goals scored (only if two teams); 6) Goal difference; 7) Goals scored; 8) Fairplay ranking; 9) Draw

=== Positions by round ===
Number = One less match played per underline.

= Qualification for the Championship group; = Qualification for the Conference League group; = Qualification for the Relegation group

Team ╲ Round	1	2	3	4	5	6	7	8	9	10	11	12	13	14	15	16	17	18	19	20	21	22	23	24	25	26	27	28	29	30
Levski	1	1	1	2	2	2	2	1	1	1	1	1	1	1	1	1	1	1	1	1	1	1	1	1	1	1	1	1	1	1
Ludogorets	2	2	2	1	1	1	1	2	3	3	3	3	4	4	5	4	3	3	3	3	2	2	2	2	2	2	2	2	2	2
CSKA 1948	4	5	4	6	5	3	4	3	2	2	2	2	2	2	2	2	2	2	2	2	3	4	3	3	3	3	3	3	3	3
CSKA Sofia	9	8	11	12	12	15	14	12	12	12	12	9	8	6	6	6	5	4	5	5	4	3	4	4	4	4	4	4	4	4
Lokomotiv Plovdiv	3	4	5	5	4	4	3	4	5	4	5	4	3	3	3	3	4	6	6	6	6	6	6	6	6	6	6	5	5	5
Cherno More	10	3	3	3	3	5	5	5	4	5	4	5	5	5	4	5	6	5	4	4	5	5	5	5	5	5	5	6	6	6
Arda	13	14	7	8	8	9	11	10	11	11	10	11	11	13	12	10	9	10	10	10	9	8	7	7	8	8	7	7	7	7
Botev Plovdiv	7	13	14	15	11	14	16	16	13	13	14	13	14	11	9	12	11	11	11	11	11	11	11	10	11	11	11	9	10	8
Slavia	6	11	13	14	16	13	13	15	15	16	13	14	13	10	8	7	7	7	7	7	7	7	8	8	7	7	8	8	8	9
Botev Vratsa	5	12	10	11	10	7	7	8	7	6	6	7	6	7	7	8	8	8	9	9	10	9	9	11	9	9	9	10	11	10
Lokomotiv Sofia	8	10	6	4	6	6	6	7	6	8	9	10	10	8	11	9	10	9	8	8	8	10	10	9	10	10	10	11	9	11
Spartak Varna	12	7	8	10	13	12	15	11	9	9	8	8	7	9	10	11	12	12	12	12	12	12	14	12	13	13	13	13	13	12
Dobrudzha	14	6	9	7	7	8	12	14	14	14	16	16	16	16	16	16	16	16	16	15	15	13	12	13	12	12	12	12	12	13
Septemvri	16	16	16	16	14	16	10	13	16	15	15	15	15	15	14	14	15	15	15	16	13	15	13	14	14	14	15	15	14	14
Beroe	11	9	12	9	9	10	9	9	10	7	7	6	9	12	13	13	13	13	13	13	14	14	15	15	15	15	14	14	15	15
Montana	15	15	15	13	15	11	8	6	8	10	11	12	12	14	15	15	14	14	14	14	16	16	16	16	16	16	16	16	16	16

Source: Bulgarian-football.com (in Bulgarian)

=== Results by round ===
Results are shown in order of play.
Rescheduled results are underlined, with their original round being shown as superscript.

Team ╲ Round	1	2	3	4	5	6	7	8	9	10	11	12	13	14	15	16	17	18	19	20	21	22	23	24	25	26	27	28	29	30
Levski	W	W	W	W	D	W	W	D	L	W^{6}	W	W	W	W	L	W	W	L	W	W	W	W	W	L	W	W	W	D	W	D
Ludogorets	W	W	W	W	D	W	D	D	W	D	D	L	D	L	W	W	W	D	W^{6}	W	W	L	D	W	W	W	W	W	D	L
CSKA 1948	W	D	W	L	W	W	L	W	W	W	D	W	W	D	L	L	W	W	D	W	L	L	W	W	D	W	W	L	W	W
CSKA Sofia	D	D	L	D	L	D	W	L^{5}	D	D	D	W	W	W	W	W	W	W	L	W	W	W	L	W	W	L	W	W	W	D
Lokomotiv Plovdiv	W	D	W	D	W	D	W	D	L	W	D	W	D	L	W	D	D	L	L	W	D	D	D	L	L	W	W	W	D	D
Cherno More	D	W	W	D	W	D	L	W	W	D	W	L	D	D	W	L	L	W	W	D	D	D	L	D	W	W	L	L	D	L
Arda	L	D	W	D	L	D	L	W^{5}	L	L	W	L	D	L	W	W	D	D	W	L	W	D	W	D	L	W	W	W	L	W
Botev Plovdiv	D	L	L	L	W	L	L	W	L	L^{6}	W	D	L	W	W	L	W	D	L	D	L	W	D	W	D	L	W	W	D	W
Slavia	D	L	L	L	L	W	D	L	D	D	W	D	D	W	W	W	W	W	D	L	L	L	L	W	W	D	L	W	L	D
Botev Vratsa	D	L	D	D	D	W	W	L	D	W	L	L	W	D	W	L	L	W	D	L	D	D	D	L	W	W	L	D	L	W
Lokomotiv Sofia	D	D	W	W	D	D	L	L	D	D	L	L	D	W	L	W	D	W	W	L	D	L	W	L	D	W^{22}	L	L	W	L
Spartak Varna	D	D	D	L	L	D	L	W	W	D	D	D	W	L	L	D	L	L	L	D	D	D	L	W	L	L	L	L	W	D
Dobrudzha	L	W	L	W	L	L	L	L	D	L	L	L	L	W	L	D	L	L	D	W	D	W	W	L	W	L	L	D	L	L
Septemvri	L	L	L	L	W	L	W	L	L	D	D	W	L	L	W	L	L	L	D	L	W	W	L	L	L	L^{22}	L	D	W	D
Beroe	D	D	L	W	L	D	W	D	W	L	D	L	L	L	D	L	L	D	L^{6}	D	L	D	D	L	L	L	W	L	L	D
Montana	L	D	L	D	L	W	W	W	L	L	L	D	D	L	L	L	D	L	D	L	L	L	D	L	L	L	L	L	L	D

Source: Bulgarian-football.com (in Bulgarian)
W = Win; D = Draw; L = Loss

=== Results ===
Home \ Away	ARD	BER	BPD	BVR	CHM	CSK	CSS	DOB	LEV	LPD	LSO	LUD	MON	SEP	SLA	SPV
Arda	—	2–2	0–0	0–2	0–1	3–0	1–0	2–0	0–3	0–0	1–1	1–0	2–1	0–1	2–1	1–0
Beroe	0–0	—	1–2	2–0	1–2	1–1	0–3	1–0	0–1	0–0	1–3	0–4	1–1	0–0	0–3	0–0
Botev Plovdiv	0–5	0–0	—	1–3	2–1	1–2	1–1	2–1	0–1	1–1	0–1	2–1	0–1	2–0	1–1	5–0
Botev Vratsa	1–0	0–0	1–2	—	1–0	0–0	1–1	0–0	0–0	1–2	3–2	0–1	0–0	2–1	0–1	2–0
Cherno More	0–0	4–0	2–1	0–0	—	0–4	2–0	2–0	1–3	1–1	0–1	0–0	1–0	1–1	1–3	0–0
CSKA 1948	1–0	2–1	0–0	1–0	0–1	—	0–2	0–0	1–3	4–0	3–2	5–4	2–1	2–1	3–1	1–1
CSKA Sofia	3–1	5–1	2–1	1–0	0–0	0–1	—	2–0	1–1	2–1	2–0	0–0	3–1	3–1	1–0	1–1
Dobrudzha	0–2	1–0	0–3	0–2	2–1	2–1	0–1	—	2–2	1–1	2–2	0–2	1–0	3–0	2–1	2–0
Levski	1–0	3–1	3–0	3–1	2–1	2–1	0–1	3–0	—	1–0	4–3	0–0	5–0	7–0	2–0	2–1
Lokomotiv Plovdiv	0–2	1–0	0–4	3–0	1–1	0–5	1–0	1–0	1–0	—	1–0	1–1	0–0	1–0	2–1	1–1
Lokomotiv Sofia	0–0	2–1	3–2	0–1	1–1	0–1	1–1	3–1	1–2	2–2	—	1–3	3–0	3–0	1–1	0–0
Ludogorets	2–3	2–1	2–1	2–0	0–0	3–0	3–0	2–1	1–0	1–1	0–0	—	3–0	5–0	1–1	1–1
Montana	1–1	0–1	0–0	0–0	1–3	0–1	0–1	1–0	1–5	1–1	1–2	0–3	—	2–0	0–0	1–2
Septemvri	1–4	2–3	1–3	0–0	0–3	1–4	2–0	2–1	1–2	2–2	1–0	0–2	1–0	—	0–1	0–0
Slavia	2–0	0–0	0–1	2–2	0–0	2–2	0–2	3–1	2–0	0–2	2–0	0–3	2–1	1–2	—	4–0
Spartak Varna	3–0	0–0	3–2	1–1	1–3	1–2	0–4	1–0	1–3	1–2	2–2	1–5	1–0	1–4	1–1	—

Source: Bulgarian Football
Legend: Blue = home team win; Yellow = draw; Red = away team win.
For upcoming matches, an "a" indicates there is an article about the rivalry between the two participants.

=== Rescheduled matches ===
Round	Home team	Away team	Original date	New date	Reason
5	Arda	CSKA Sofia	18 August 2025	18 September 2025	Match was rescheduled after an official request by Arda due to their Conference League play-off match against Raków Częstochowa.
6	Botev Plovdiv	Levski	25 August 2025	30 September 2025	Match was rescheduled after an official request by Levski Sofia due to their Conference League play-off match against AZ Alkmaar.
6	Beroe	Ludogorets	25 August 2025	19 December 2025	Match was rescheduled after an official request by Ludogorets Razgrad due to their Europa League play-off matches against Shkëndija.
22	Lokomotiv Sofia	Septemvri	22 February 2026	17 March 2026	Match was rescheduled due to significant snowfall and poor pitch condition.

== Play-offs ==
=== Championship group ===
==== Table ====
Points and goals carried over in full from regular season.

Pos	Team	Pld	W	D	L	GF	GA	GD	Pts	Qualification
1	Levski Sofia (C)	36	25	6	5	71	25	+46	81	Qualification for the Champions League first qualifying round
2	CSKA 1948	36	20	7	9	54	35	+19	67 (Note: Head to head points: CSKA 1948 9, Ludogorets Razgrad 3.)	Qualification for the Conference League second qualifying round
3	Ludogorets (O)	36	19	10	7	61	25	+36	67	Qualification for the Conference League play-off
4	CSKA Sofia	36	18	9	9	47	30	+17	63	Qualification for the Europa League first qualifying round (Note: The winners of the 2025–26 Bulgarian Cup (CSKA Sofia) qualified for the Europa League first qualifying round.)

Source: soccerway, Bulgarian Football
Rules for classification: 1) Points; 2) Points in regular season and second phase; 3) Head-to-head points in regular season and second phase; 4) Head-to-head goal difference in regular season and second phase; 5) Head-to-head goals scored in regular season and second phase; 6) Head-to-head away goals scored in regular season and second phase (if two teams tied); 7) Goal difference; 8) Goals scored; 9) Fair play ranking; 10) Drawing of lots.
(C) Champions; (O) Play-off winners

==== Positions by round ====
= Qualification for the Champions League first qualifying round; = Qualification for the Conference League second qualifying round; = Qualification for the Conference League play-off

Team ╲ Round	0	1	2	3	4	5	6
Levski	1	1	1	1	1	1	1
CSKA 1948	3	2	2	4	4	2	2
Ludogorets	2	3	3	2	2	3	3
CSKA Sofia	4	4	4	3	3	4	4

Source: Bulgarian-football.com (in Bulgarian)

==== Results by round ====
Team ╲ Round	1	2	3	4	5	6
Levski	W	W	L	D	W	D
CSKA 1948	W	L	L	D	W	D
Ludogorets	L	L	W	D	L	W
CSKA Sofia	L	W	W	D	L	L

Source: Bulgarian-football.com (in Bulgarian)
W = Win; D = Draw; L = Loss

==== Results ====
Home \ Away	CSK	CSS	LEV	LUD
CSKA 1948	—	0–1	0–0	1–0
CSKA Sofia	1–1	—	1–3	1–0
Levski	1–0	2–0	—	0–1
Ludogorets	1–2	1–0	1–1	—

Source: Bulgarian Football
Legend: Blue = home team win; Yellow = draw; Red = away team win.
For upcoming matches, an "a" indicates there is an article about the rivalry between the two participants.

=== Conference League group ===
==== Table ====
Points and goals carried over in full from regular season.

Pos	Team	Pld	W	D	L	GF	GA	GD	Pts	Qualification
5	Lokomotiv Plovdiv	36	14	13	9	36	41	−5	55	Qualification for the Conference League play-off
6	Arda	36	15	9	12	42	34	+8	54	
7	Cherno More	36	14	12	10	40	34	+6	54	
8	Botev Plovdiv	36	13	7	16	49	45	+4	46	

Source: soccerway, Bulgarian Football
Rules for classification: 1) Points; 2) Points in regular season and second phase; 3) Head-to-head points in regular season and second phase; 4) Head-to-head goal difference in regular season and second phase; 5) Head-to-head goals scored in regular season and second phase; 6) Head-to-head away goals scored in regular season and second phase (if two teams tied); 7) Goal difference; 8) Goals scored; 9) Fair play ranking; 10) Drawing of lots.

==== Positions by round ====
= Qualification for the Conference League play-off

Team ╲ Round	0	1	2	3	4	5	6
Lokomotiv Plovdiv	5	6	5	5	6	6	5
Arda	7	7	7	7	7	7	6
Cherno More	6	5	6	6	5	5	7
Botev Plovdiv	8	8	8	8	8	8	8

Source: Bulgarian-football.com (in Bulgarian)

==== Results by round ====
Team ╲ Round	1	2	3	4	5	6
Lokomotiv Plovdiv	L	W	W	L	L	W
Arda	L	D	L	W	W	W
Cherno More	W	D	W	W	L	L
Botev Plovdiv	W	L	L	L	W	L

Source: Bulgarian-football.com (in Bulgarian)
W = Win; D = Draw; L = Loss

==== Results ====
Home \ Away	ARD	BPD	CHM	LPD
Arda	—	0–2	0–0	4–0
Botev Plovdiv	1–2	—	5–0	0–2
Cherno More	2–3	2–0	—	2–0
Lokomotiv Plovdiv	2–0	2–1	0–1	—

Source: Bulgarian Football
Legend: Blue = home team win; Yellow = draw; Red = away team win.
For upcoming matches, an "a" indicates there is an article about the rivalry between the two participants.

=== Relegation group ===
==== Table ====
Points and goals carried over in full from regular season.

Pos	Team	Pld	W	D	L	GF	GA	GD	Pts	Qualification or relegation
9	Botev Vratsa	37	13	14	10	36	32	+4	53	
10	Lokomotiv Sofia	37	11	14	12	51	48	+3	47	
11	Slavia Sofia	37	12	10	15	42	44	−2	46	
12	Spartak Varna	37	8	13	16	35	57	−22	37	
13	Septemvri Sofia (O)	37	9	9	19	32	64	−32	36	Qualification for the relegation play-off
14	Beroe (R)	37	7	13	17	28	52	−24	34	Relegation to the Second League
15	Dobrudzha (R)	37	8	7	22	28	52	−24	31	Relegation to the Second League
16	Montana (R)	37	4	11	22	21	55	−34	23	Relegation to the Second League

Source: soccerway, Bulgarian Football
Rules for classification: 1) Points; 2) Points in regular season; 3) Head-to-head points in regular season; 4) Head-to-head goal difference in regular season; 5) Head-to-head goals scored in regular season; 6) Head-to-head away goals scored in regular season (if two teams tied); 7) Goal difference; 8) Goals scored; 9) Fair play ranking; 10) Drawing of lots.
(O) Play-off winners; (R) Relegated

=== Positions by round ===
= Qualification for the relegation play-off; = Relegation to the Second League

Team ╲ Round	0	1	2	3	4	5	6	7
Botev Vratsa	10	10	9	10	9	9	9	9
Lokomotiv Sofia	11	11	10	11	11	10	10	10
Slavia	9	9	11	9	10	11	11	11
Spartak Varna	12	13	14	14	13	14	14	12
Septemvri	14	12	13	13	14	13	12	13
Beroe	15	15	12	12	12	12	13	14
Dobrudzha	13	14	15	15	15	15	15	15
Montana	16	16	16	16	16	16	16	16

Source: Bulgarian-football.com (in Bulgarian)

=== Results by round ===
W = Win; D = Draw; L = Loss

Team ╲ Round	1	2	3	4	5	6	7
Botev Vratsa	D	W	D	D	W	W	W
Lokomotiv Sofia	D	W	D	D	D	W	L
Slavia	D	L	W	L	L	L	W
Spartak Varna	L	L	D	W	L	W	W
Septemvri	D	D	L	D	W	W	D
Beroe	W	W	D	W	D	L	L
Dobrudzha	L	L	D	L	W	L	D
Montana	W	D	D	D	L	L	L

Source: Bulgarian-football.com (in Bulgarian)

=== Results ===
Home \ Away	BER	BVR	DOB	LSO	MON	SEP	SLA	SPV
Beroe	—	—	—	—	2–2	0–1	3–0	—
Botev Vratsa	3–0	—	—	—	1–0	1–1	—	2–1
Dobrudzha	0–1	1–2	—	0–3	—	—	—	—
Lokomotiv Sofia	1–1	2–2	—	—	—	1–1	2–0	—
Montana	—	—	1–0	2–2	—	—	—	0–2
Septemvri	—	—	1–1	—	1–1	—	—	1–0
Slavia	—	1–1	0–2	—	2–0	2–1	—	—
Spartak Varna	1–2	—	1–1	3–0	—	—	2–1	—

Source: Bulgarian Football
Legend: Blue = home team win; Yellow = draw; Red = away team win.
For upcoming matches, an "a" indicates there is an article about the rivalry between the two participants.

== Conference League play-off ==
29 May 2026
19:00 EEST

Ludogorets	0–0 (a.e.t.)	Lokomotiv Plovdiv
	Report
Penalties
Duah (penalty missed); Yordanov (penalty scored); Erick Marcus (penalty scored); Rwan Cruz (penalty scored)	3–1	(penalty missed) Ali; (penalty missed) Lucas Ryan; (penalty scored) Chindriș; (penalty missed) Zwarts

Huvepharma Arena, Razgrad
Referee: Lyuboslav Lyubomirov (Pernik)

== Promotion/relegation play-off ==
28 May 2026
17:00 EEST

Septemvri Sofia	2–1	Yantra
P. Georgiev 73'; Stojanović 90'	Report	Mi. Angelov 42'

Stadion Dragalevtsi, Sofia
Referee: Kristiyan Kolev (Plovdiv)

== Season statistics ==
=== Scoring ===
- First goal of the season:
  (Bulgaria) Atanas Iliev (CSKA 1948) against Arda (18 July 2025)
- Last goal of the season:
  (Bulgaria) Ivaylo Chochev (Ludogorets) against CSKA Sofia (25 May 2026)

=== Top goalscorers ===
As of 25 May 2026

Rank	Player	Club	Goals
1	(Brazilian Football Confederation) Everton Bala	Levski	18
1	(Football Federation of the Islamic Republic of Mauritania) Mamadou Diallo	CSKA 1948	18
3	(Bulgarian Football Union) Ivaylo Chochev	Ludogorets	17
4	(French Football Federation) Bertrand Fourrier	Septemvri	13
4	(Argentine Football Association) Santiago Godoy	CSKA Sofia	13
6	(Royal Spanish Football Federation) Alberto Salido	Beroe/Ludogorets	10
7	(Bulgarian Football Union) Boris Dimitrov	Montana	9
7	(Bulgarian Football Union) Birsent Karagaren	Arda	9
7	(Brazilian Football Confederation) Franklin Mascote	Botev Plovdiv	9
7	(Colombian Football Federation) Juan Perea	Lokomotiv Plovdiv/Levski	9
7	(Malian Football Federation) Mustapha Sangaré	Levski	9
7	(Football Association of Serbia) Petar Stanić	Ludogorets	9

==== Hat-tricks ====
As of 25 May 2026

Rnd	Player	Club	Goals	Date	Home	Score	Away	Ref.
3	(Bulgarian Football Union) Nikolay Zlatev	Cherno More	78', 89', 90'+6' (pen.)	4 August 2025	Cherno More	4–0	Beroe	
4	(Royal Spanish Football Federation) Alberto Salido	Beroe	23', 27', 50'	11 August 2025	Septemvri	2–3	Beroe	
35	(Bulgarian Football Union) Antonio Vutov	Arda	2', 13', 25'	16 May 2026	Arda	4–0	Lokomotiv Plovdiv	
37	(Football Federation of Macedonia) Georg Stojanovski	Spartak Varna	9', 31', 63'	22 May 2026	Spartak Varna	3–0	Lokomotiv Sofia	

=== Clean sheets ===
As of 25 May 2026

==== Player ====
Rank	Goalkeeper	Club	Clean sheets
1	(Bulgarian Football Union) Anatoli Gospodinov	Arda	15
2	(German Football Association) Hendrik Bonmann	Ludogorets	14
2	(Bulgarian Football Union) Svetoslav Vutsov	Levski	14
4	(Football Federation of Belarus) Fyodor Lapoukhov	CSKA Sofia	13
4	(Swiss Football Association) Bojan Milosavljević	Lokomotiv Plovdiv	13
6	(Bulgarian Football Union) Kristian Tomov	Cherno More	12
7	(Bulgarian Football Union) Daniel Naumov	Botev Plovdiv	11
8	(Bulgarian Football Union) Yanko Georgiev	Septemvri	9
8	(French Football Federation) Lévi Ntumba	Slavia	9
8	(Bulgarian Football Union) Martin Velichkov	Lokomotiv Sofia	9

==== Team ====
- Most clean sheets: 19
  - Ludogorets

=== Discipline ===
As of 25 May 2026

==== Player ====
- Most yellow cards: 13
  - (Bulgaria) Reyan Daskalov (Lokomotiv Sofia)
- Most red cards: 2
  - (Republic of the Congo) Ryan Bidounga (Lokomotiv Sofia)
  - (Bulgaria) Erol Dost (Lokomotiv Sofia)
  - (Nigeria) David Idowu (Arda)
  - (Bulgaria) Anton Ivanov (Dobrudzha)
  - (Bulgaria) Ivaylo Ivanov (Lokomotiv Plovdiv)
  - (Bulgaria) Bozhidar Katsarov (Lokomotiv Sofia)
  - (Bulgaria) Hristo Mitev (Lokomotiv Sofia)
  - (Portugal) Vasco Oliveira (Dobrudzha)
  - (Norway) Vajebah Sakor (Montana)
  - (Ivory Coast) Adama Traoré (CSKA 1948)
  - (Bulgaria) Iliya Yurukov (Botev Vratsa)

==== Team ====
- Most yellow cards: 91
  - Lokomotiv Plovdiv
- Fewest yellow cards: 65
  - Slavia
- Most red cards: 10
  - Dobrudzha
  - Lokomotiv Sofia
- Fewest red cards: 1
  - Cherno More
  - Levski

== Awards ==
=== Annual awards ===
Award	Winner	Club	Ref.
Player of the Season	(Bulgaria) Ivaylo Chochev	Ludogorets	
Rookie of the Season	(Bulgaria) Kristiyan Balov	Slavia	
Goalkeeper of the Season	(Bulgaria) Svetoslav Vutsov	Levski	
Defender of the Season	(Brazil) Maicon	Levski	
Midfielder of the Season	(Bulgaria) Ivaylo Chochev	Ludogorets	
Forward of the Season	(Brazil) Everton Bala	Levski	
Manliness and character	(Bulgaria) Lyuboslav Penev	Lokomotiv Sofia	
Contribution to football	(Bulgaria) Dimitar Iliev	Retired	
Coach of the Season	(Spain) Julio Velázquez	Levski	

Team of the Year
Goalkeeper	(Bulgaria) Svetoslav Vutsov (Levski)			
Defenders	(Spain) Son (Ludogorets)	(Bulgaria) Kristian Dimitrov (Levski)	(Bulgaria) Teodor Ivanov (CSKA Sofia)	(Brazil) Maicon (Levski)
Midfielders	(Serbia) Petar Stanić (Ludogorets)		(Algeria) Akram Bouras (Levski)	(Bulgaria) Ivaylo Chochev (Ludogorets)
Forwards	(Mauritania) Mamadou Diallo (CSKA 1948)		(Brazil) Everton Bala (Levski)	(Argentina) Santiago Godoy (CSKA Sofia)
