= Manuel Amoros =

French footballer (born 1962)

- Amoros with France at the 1986 World Cup

Personal information
- Full name: Manuel Amoros
- Date of birth: 1 February 1962 (age 64)
- Place of birth: Nîmes, Gard, France
- Height: 1.72 m (5 ft 8 in)
- Position: Right-back

Youth career
- 1972–1977: Gallia Club Lunel
- 1977–1980: Monaco

Senior career*
| Years | Team | Apps | (Gls) |
| 1979–1980 | Monaco II | 17 | (3) |
| 1980–1989 | Monaco | 287 | (36) |
| 1989–1993 | Marseille | 108 | (2) |
| 1993–1995 | Lyon | 66 | (3) |
| 1995–1996 | Marseille | 16 | (0) |
| 1999 | AS Saint-Rémy | | |
| Total | | 494 | (44) |

International career
| 1982–1992 | France | 82 | (1) |

Managerial career
- 2004–2006: Kuwait (assistant)
- 2010: Comoros
- 2012–2014: Benin
Medal record
Representing France
UEFA European Championship
| Winner | 1984 |
- * Club domestic league appearances and goals

Manuel Amoros (born 1 February 1962) is a French former professional footballer who played as a right-back. He was capped 82 times for France, and played in the UEFA European Championships finals of 1984 and 1992, and the FIFA World Cup finals in 1982 and 1986.

== Biography ==
Amoros was born in Nîmes, Gard, to Spanish parents escaping from Francisco Franco's regime. He represented the France national team.

In June 2010, Amoros was appointed national team manager for the Comoros Islands, which coached to September 2010. In January 2012, he was named new coach of Benin, replacing Edme Codjo, who had been in charge since August 2011.

== Honours ==
Monaco

- Division 1: 1981–82, 1987–88
- Coupe de France: 1984–85

Marseille

- Division 1: 1989–90, 1990–91, 1991–92
- UEFA Champions League: 1992–93; runner-up: 1990–91

France

- UEFA European Championship: 1984
- FIFA World Cup third place: 1986

Individual

- FIFA World Cup Best Young Player: 1982
- Onze d'Argent: 1986
- French Player of the Year: 1986
- FIFA World Cup All-Star Team: 1986
- World XI: 1986
- World Soccer World XI: 1986, 1987
- Onze Mondial: 1986, 1987, 1988
