= Elohim Kaboré =

Burkinabe footballer (born 2006)

Personal information
- Full name: Moïse Elohim Victoire Kaboré
- Date of birth: 20 December 2006 (age 19)
- Place of birth: Ivory Coast
- Height: 1.80 m (5 ft 11 in)
- Position: Centre-forward

Team information
- Current team: Beveren (on loan from Hammarby)
- Number: 9

Youth career
- 2018–2022: ASEC Mimosas

Senior career*
Years	Team	Apps	(Gls)
2022–2025	ASEC Mimosas	9	(4)
2025–	Hammarby	22	(2)
2026–	→ Beveren (loan)	8	(2)

International career^{‡}
2026–	Burkina Faso	7	(6)
- * Club domestic league appearances and goals as of 25 October 2026 ‡ National team caps and goals as of 17 November 2026

Moïse Elohim Victoire Kaboré (born 20 December 2006) is a professional footballer who plays as a centre-forward for Belgian Pro League club Beveren on loan from Allsvenskan club Hammarby IF. Born in the Ivory Coast, he plays for the Burkina Faso national team.

== Club career ==
Kaboré is a youth product of ASEC Mimosas since 2018, and was promoted to their senior squad for the 2022–23 season. On 5 January 2025, he transferred to Allsvenskan side Hammarby on a 5-year contract. He scored 15 seconds into his debut with Hammarby, the tying goal in a 1–1 Allsvenskan draw with on BK Häcken on 27 April 2025.

On 12 August 2026, Kaboré joined Beveren in Belgium on a season-long loan with an option to buy.

== International career ==
Kaboré was born in the Ivory Coast to a Burkinabe father and Ivorian mother, and holds dual citizenship. He was called up to the Burkina Faso national team for a set of friendlies in March 2026. He scored a hattrick on his debut with Burkina Faso, a 5–0 win over Guinea Bissau on 28 March 2026.

=== International goals ===
Scores and results list Burkina Faso's goal tally first.

List of international goals scored by Elohim Kaboré
No.	Date	Venue	Opponent	Score	Result	Competition
1	28 March 2026	4 August Stadium, Ouagadougou, Burkina Faso	Guinea-Bissau	3–0	5–0	Friendly
2	28 March 2026	4 August Stadium, Ouagadougou, Burkina Faso	Guinea-Bissau	4–0	5–0	Friendly
3	28 March 2026	4 August Stadium, Ouagadougou, Burkina Faso	Guinea-Bissau	5–0	5–0	Friendly
4	9 June 2026	National Football Stadium, Minsk, Belarus	Belarus	1–2	2–2	Friendly
5	12 November 2026	4 August Stadium, Ouagadougou, Burkina Faso	Mauritania	1–0	1–0	2027 Africa Cup of Nations qualification
6	17 November 2026	Nouakchott Olympic Stadium, Nouakchott, Mauritania	Mauritania	3–1	3–1	2027 Africa Cup of Nations qualification

== Honours ==
ASEC Mimosas

- Côte d'Ivoire Premier Division: 2022–23
- Coupe de Côte d'Ivoire: 2023
- Coupe Houphouët-Boigny: 2023
