= Ede Oloko =

Beninese footballer (born 2001)

Personal information
- Full name: Joseph Oloko Ede
- Date of birth: 10 January 2001 (age 25)
- Place of birth: Nigeria
- Height: 1.83 m (6 ft 0 in)
- Position: Forward

Team information
- Current team: Liepāja
- Number: 18

Senior career*
Years	Team	Apps	(Gls)
–2021	36 Lion FC		
2021–2022	AS Cotonou		
2022–2023	Karlovy Vary	7	(6)
2023–2024	Silon Táborsko	3	(0)
2023–2024	Silon Táborsko B	10	(2)
2024	→ Jelgava (loan)	19	(8)
2024–2025	Jelgava	7	(3)
2025–	Liepāja	35	(16)
2026	→ Tukums (loan)	16	(16)

International career^{‡}
2026–	Benin	3	(1)
- * Club domestic league appearances and goals as of 12 November 2026 ‡ National team caps and goals as of 16 November 2026

Joseph Oloko Ede (born 10 January 2001) is a professional footballer who plays as a forward for Latvian Higher League club Liepāja. Born in Nigeria, he represents the Benin national team.

== Club career ==
Oloko began his career with Nigerian club 36 Lion FC, a club renowned for youth development. He signed for Benin Premier League team AS Cotonou in 2021, from which he joined Czech Bohemian Football League team FC Slavia Karlovy Vary in 2022. After scoring six goals in seven games, he joined second tier Czech side Silon Táborsko.

Oloko signed for Latvian Higher League (Virslīga) team FS Jelgava, initially on a loan deal, which was made permanent in July 2024 after 6 months. He scored a total of 11 league goals in 26 matches, but faced work documentation issues towards the end of the season that hindered his ability to play for Jelgava. After this season, Oloko joined fellow Latvian team Liepāja on a free transfer.

Oloko scored just one goal in his first season at the club and was loaned to Tukums 2000 for first half of the 2026 season. He turned out to be prolific in the league for Tukums 2000, opening his account against Riga FC with a hat-trick in a 3–3 draw. He would score four in one game against Ogre United, bringing his tally to 11 goals in 9 matches to lead the scoring charts in May.

Oloko was recalled to Liepāja in July, and scored the winning goal in the club's first ever European win, a 1–0 victory over Montenegrin side FK Dečić in the Conference League first qualifying round. With 25 goals in 27 games, equivalent to 25 points, Oloko lead the European Golden Shoe race in September 2026, ahead of Raphinha in second.

== International career ==
Born in Nigeria, Oloko is eligible to play for Benin, and was called up for the nation in September 2026 for the first time. He made his debut as a late substitute in a 1–1 AFCON qualifying draw against Burkina Faso.
