= 2027 Africa Cup of Nations qualification Group F =

2027 AFCON qualifying group F

Group F of the 2027 Africa Cup of Nations qualification is one of twelve groups that will decide the teams which will qualify for the 2027 Africa Cup of Nations final tournament in Kenya, Tanzania and Uganda. The group consists of four teams: Burkina Faso, Benin, Mauritania and Central African Republic.

The teams will play against each other in a home-and-away round-robin format between September 2026 and March 2027.

== Standings ==
Pos	Team	Pld	W	D	L	GF	GA	GD	Pts	Qualification	(Benin)	(Burkina Faso)	(Mauritania)	(Central African Republic)
1	Benin (Q)	4	3	1	0	8	3	+5	10	Final tournament	—	24 Mar	2–1	4–1
2	Burkina Faso (Q)	4	3	1	0	6	2	+4	10	Final tournament	1–1	—	1–0	28 Mar
3	Mauritania (E)	4	1	0	3	5	7	−2	3		28 Mar	1–3	—	3–1
4	Central African Republic (E)	4	0	0	4	2	9	−7	0		0–1	0–1	24 Mar	—

Updated to match(es) played on 17 November 2026. Source: CAF
Rules for classification: Tiebreakers
(E) Eliminated; (Q) Qualified for the phase indicated

== Matches ==
24 September 2026
16:00 UTC+0

Mauritania	3–1	Central African Republic
Koïta 32' (pen.); Camara 69'; Diallo 89'	Report	Koyalipou 48'

Larbi Zaouli Stadium, Casablanca (Morocco)
Referee: Boubou Traoré (Mali)
25 September 2026
19:00 UTC+0

Burkina Faso	1–1	Benin
Traoré 20' (pen.)	Report	Tosin 68' (pen.)

4 August Stadium, Ouagadougou
Referee: Omar Artan (Somalia)

28 September 2026
16:00 UTC+0

Central African Republic	0–1	Burkina Faso
	Report	Camara 60'

Larbi Zaouli Stadium, Casablanca (Morocco)
Referee: Aldair Grabe (Guinea-Bissau)
29 September 2026
17:00 UTC+0

Benin	2–1	Mauritania
Aloko 31', 46'	Report	Koïta 80' (pen.)

Alassane Ouattara Stadium, Abidjan (Ivory Coast)
Referee: Messie Nkounkou (Congo)

12 November 2026
20:00 UTC+0

Benin	4–1	Central African Republic
Hassane 7'; Aloko 31'; Tosin 36', 56'	Report	Mafouta 19'

Félix Houphouët-Boigny Stadium, Abidjan (Ivory Coast)
Referee: Edson António Esoko (Angola)
13 November 2026
17:00 UTC+0

Burkina Faso	1–0	Mauritania
E. Kaboré 90+4'	Report

4 August Stadium, Ouagadougou
Referee: Alhadj Allaou Mahamat (Chad)

16 November 2026
17:00 UTC+0

Central African Republic	0–1	Benin
	Report	Oloko 90+3'

Japoma Stadium, Douala (Cameroon)
Referee: Keabetswe Dintwa (Botswana)
17 November 2026
19:00 UTC+0

Mauritania	1–3	Burkina Faso
Diadié 75'	Report	Camara 12'; Traoré 27'; E. Kaboré 89'

Nouakchott Olympic Stadium, Nouakchott
Referee: Keren Yocette (Seychelles)

24 March 2027

Benin	v	Burkina Faso
	Report

24 March 2027

Central African Republic	v	Mauritania
	Report

28 March 2027

Burkina Faso	v	Central African Republic
	Report

28 March 2027

Mauritania	v	Benin
	Report

== Goalscorers ==
There have been 21 goals scored in 8 matches, for an average of 2.62 goals per match (as of 17 November 2026).

3 goals

- (Benin) Rodolfo Aloko
- (Benin) Aiyegun Tosin

2 goals

- (Burkina Faso) Aboubacar Camara
- (Burkina Faso) Elohim Kaboré
- (Burkina Faso) Lassina Traoré
- (Mauritania) Aboubakary Koïta

1 goal

- (Benin) Imourane Hassane
- (Benin) Ede Oloko
- (Central African Republic) Goduine Koyalipou
- (Central African Republic) Louis Mafouta
- (Mauritania) Dawda Camara
- (Mauritania) Mohamed Ali Diadié
- (Mauritania) Mamadou Diallo
