= Wabi Gomez =

Beninese football manager

Personal information
- Place of birth: Benin

Managerial career
- Years: Team
- Benin (assistant)
- Stade d'Abidjan
- AS Sogara
- AS OTR Lomé
- Mogas 90 FC
- 2007–2008: Benin
- Sitatunga FC

Wabi Gomez is a Beninese former football manager.

== Career ==
In 1979, Gomez was appointed as an assistant manager of the Benin national football team. After that, he was appointed manager of Ivorian side Stade d'Abidjan, helping the club win the 1984 Coupe de Côte d'Ivoire. While managing Stade d'Abidjan, he signed Nigeria international Stephen Keshi, who later played in the French Ligue 1. During the 1990s, he was appointed manager of Gabonese side AS Sogara, helping the club reach the quarter-finals of the 1994 African Cup of Champions Clubs.

Following this stint, he was appointed manager of Togolese side AS OTR Lomé, before returning to Benin to take the reins of Mogas 90 FC. In 2007, he was appointed manager of the Benin national football team. He helped the team achieve qualification to the 2008 Africa Cup of Nations, the second time the country qualified for the tournament. Despite receiving offers from abroad, he decided to remain in Benin for the rest of his managerial career.

== Personal life ==
Gomez was born in Benin. He has been married. In 2007, he obtained a CAF Instructor license. In addition, he has attended coaching courses in Germany and France.
