= Stade Municipal (Lavié) =

Stade Municipal is a multi-use stadium in Lavié, Togo. It is currently used mostly for football matches and is the home stadium of Kotoko F.C. The stadium holds 5,000 people.
