= Irakli Modebadze =

Georgian footballer

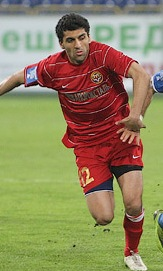
- Modebadze playing for Metalurh Zaporizhzhia

Personal information
- Date of birth: 4 October 1984 (age 42)
- Place of birth: Tbilisi, Georgian SSR
- Height: 1.84 m (6 ft 1/2 in)
- Position: Striker

Team information
- Current team: Dinamo Batumi (assistant manager)

Senior career*
Years	Team	Apps	(Gls)
2000–2001	Valensia Tbilisi	4	(1)
2001–2002	Merani-91 Tbilisi	0	(0)
2002–2007	Metalurh Zaporizhzhia	81	(16)
2004	→ Metalurh-2 Zaporizhzhia	3	(2)
2009	Chornomorets Odesa	1	(0)
2009–2010	Metalurh Zaporizhzhia	11	(1)
2010–2012	Metalurgi Rustavi	49	(22)
2012–2014	Dila Gori	38	(20)
2014	Dinamo Tbilisi	7	(0)
2014–2017	Dila Gori	62	(29)

International career
2000	Georgia U17	1	(0)
2001–2003	Georgia U19	8	(4)
2004–2005	Georgia U21	6	(2)
2006–2013	Georgia	4	(0)
- * Club domestic league appearances and goals

Irakli Modebadze (Georgian: ირაკლი მოდებაძე; born 4 October 1984) is a retired Georgian professional footballer, currently working as a coach at Erovnuli Liga club Dinamo Batumi.

He is the two-time champion of the Georgian top division and the top-scorer of the 2015 season. Modebadze has played for the senior team as well as for each of the national youth teams.

== Career ==
Modebadze started his career at Valensia Tbilisi. From 2002 until 2007 he played for Ukrainian side FC Metalurh Zaporizhzhia. The day before he turned 18, Modebadze scored his first European goal in a UEFA Cup game against Leeds United.

On 13 March 2009 he signed a contract with FC Chornomorets Odesa until the end of the 2008/09 season. The next year, the forward returned to Georgia and joined Olimpi Rustavi, who had just won their league title. In his first season for this club, Modebadze was the leading league goalscorer at some point, although eventually with 16 goals he finished in the 2nd place.

He fouled on 14 July 2012 in a friendly game with his club FC Dila Gori, in the game against FC Rot-Weiss Erfurt the Libanese footballer Joan Oumari and provoked the breakup of the game.

After a short unsuccessful spell at Dinamo Tbilisi in 2014, Modebadze re-joined Dila to reach the highest point in his career by winning the champion's title and becoming the top scorer of the 2015 season.

During the last two years he suffered from a knee injury. The forward announced an immediate retirement after making his 100th appearance for the team in November 2017. Early next year, Modebadze was appointed at Dila as a staff member in charge of the personnel selection.

In June 2019, he briefly took over as a caretaker manager. It was his idea to invite Andriy Demchenko, his team-mate at Metalurh Zaporizhzhia, to Dila Gori as a head coach. The pair worked together for more than two seasons, guiding the club to two consecutive bronze medals. In August 2023, Demchenko left Dila for Dinamo Batumi where he once again teamed up with Modebadze in January 2024.

== Personal life ==
His older brother Giorgi is also a former footballer.

== Honours ==
- Umaglesi Liga (2): 2013–14, 2014–15
- David Kipiani Cup (1): 2013–14
- Georgian Super Cup (1): 2010–11
