= FC Dila Gori =

Dila Gori
- Full name: Football Club Dila Gori
- Nickname: Guardians
- Founded: 1949; 77 years ago
- Ground: Tengiz Burjanadze Stadium; Gori, Georgia
- Capacity: 5,000
- Chairman: Davit Koziashvili
- Coach: Akis Vavalis
- League: Erovnuli Liga
- 2025: 2nd
- Website: fcdila.ge
Home colours	Away colours

FC Dila (Georgian: საფეხბურთო კლუბი დილა) is a Georgian professional football club based in Gori. The club takes part in the Erovnuli Liga, the first tier of Georgian football, and plays their home games at the Tengiz Burjanadze Stadium.

Dila have won all three domestic competitions.

== History ==
=== In the Soviet leagues ===
Founded in 1949, the club was named after poem "Dila" (literally - morning) written by Joseph Stalin, who was born in the city and spent his youth there.

Until 1961, they played under the name Dinamo Gori in Group A of Georgian republican championship. Following the second place in 1965, the next year Dila took part in the Soviet third league and despite an unbeaten run at home, finished 11th among 20 clubs in zone 4, Group B.

In 1969, Dila won the competition among the Caucasian teams. The club played several seasons in zone 4 of the Soviet Second League and after 1979 moved to zone 9 where Transcaucasia was represented. In 1967, 1974, and 1986, Dila reached the 3rd place which was their best result in the Soviet third division.

=== In Georgian leagues ===
In 1990, Georgia formed an independent league, which included all clubs from the first three Soviet football divisions. Before 2000, Dila were an average team sitting in mid-table, but in the second decade their performance deteriorated. Although most of the seasons Dila participated in the top league, twice they were relegated to Liga 2 and once to Liga 3.

In 2010, the rise started with Dila gaining two consecutive promotions within two years. In 2012 the club clinched their first title after winning the Georgian Cup and during the next five seasons four times represented Georgia in qualifying rounds of UEFA club competitions, including the Champions League. Also, twice in a row Dila participated in Europa League play-offs. During this period, they were reinforced by national team members Nukri Revishvili, Giorgi Navalovski, Otar Martsvaladze and Mate Vatsadze.

Dila won their first top-tier medals in 2013. With a single point in the starting four matches the club seemed an unlikely candidate for trophies, but later they produced an eleven-game winning run, beating all league opponents one after another, and ended up in the second place.

The club achieved their biggest success in the 2014/15 season under 25-year-old head coach Ucha Sosiashvili. Dila, whose squad included experienced players Aleksandre Kvakhadze, Irakli Modebadze and Nika Kvekveskiri, entered the title race in an early stage and concluded the season with six points clear from their two immediate rivals. Forward Irakli Modebadze became a league topscorer with 16 goals.

Facing some financial difficulties, FC Dila as a municipal property was sold at a public auction the next year. As a result, Israeli business group Starsportinvest took charge of the club in October 2016.

For three consecutive seasons starting from 2020 Dila emerged victorious from long tight contests over the league bronze medals. In 2023, they finished on equal points with Torpedo but missed out on the 3rd place due to disadvantage in head-to-head statistics only. A year later, the team sitting on top of the table at half season closed in on achieving their best result in ten years. However, they first squandered the lead and eventually, after suffering a narrow home defeat on the final day of the season, slumped to 3rd.

In 2025, Dila secured their first title in ten years after convincing victories over the league champions and cup holders in a four-team Super cup tournament. They also claimed the national cup for the second time in history. Dila nearly missed out on the top league spot, but still concluded the season on a positive mood with two trophies in a single year.

=== Seasons ===
Season	Div.	Pos.	Pl.	W	D	L	GF	GA	P	Cup	Europe
1990	1st	10	34	12	6	16	52	58	42	Round of 8	
1991	1st	11	19	7	3	9	29	32	24	Round of 8	
1991–92	1st	10	38	14	8	16	64	64	50	Round of 16	
1992–93	1st	13	32	11	5	16	39	49	38	Round of 8	
1993–94	1st	9	18	4	2	12	12	35	14	Round of 8	
1994–95	1st	8	30	10	7	13	25	35	37	Round of 8	
1995–96	1st	8	30	12	4	14	53	55	40	Quarter-finals	
1996–97	1st	8	30	10	7	13	30	39	37		
1997–98	1st	9	30	11	4	15	31	36	37	Semi-finals	
1998–99	1st	10	30	10	5	15	37	54	35	Round of 8	
1999–00	1st	8	14	6	2	6	19	24	20	Quarter-finals	
2000–01	1st	10↓ (Note: Lost 0–2 to Samgurali in playoffs)	22	5	3	14	14	44	18	Quarter-finals	
2001–02	2nd	2↑	22	15	4	3	51	14	49	Round of 8	
2002–03	1st	7	22	6	3	13	17	29	21	Quarter-finals	
2003–04	1st	6	22	10	4	8	28	20	34	Semi-finals	Inter-Toto Cup
2004–05	1st	10	36	2	4	30	20	88	10	Round of 8	
2005–06	1st	11	30	9	4	17	35	44	31	Round of 16	
2006–07	1st	13	26	3	6	17	21	56	15	Round of 16	
2007–08	1st	14↓	26	1	5	20	12	53	8	Quarter-finals	
2008–09	1st, East	5↓	30	12	9	9	48	31	45	–	
2009–10	3rd, East	1↑								–	
2010–11	2nd	3↑ (Note: Defeated Samtredia 2–0 in playoffs)	32	20	9	3	58	21	69	Round of 16	
2011–12	1st	5	28	10	7	11	38	32	37	Winner	
2012–13	1st	2	32	22	2	8	60	26	48	Quarter-finals	Europa League Play-off
2013–14	1st	9	32	11	8	13	44	36	41	Semi-finals	Europa League Play-off
2014–15	1st	1	30	19	7	4	50	21	64	Quarter-finals	
2015–16	1st	3	30	19	5	6	51	25	62	Second Round	Champions League 2Q
2016	1st	5 (Note: Beat Guria 2–0 in playoffs)	12	5	2	5	13	12	17	Second Round	Europa League 1Q
2017	1st	7	36	11	8	17	41	51	41	Quarter-finals	
2018	1st	5	36	17	12	7	60	40	63	Round of 16	
2019	1st	7	36	11	10	15	40	44	43	Round of 16	
2020	1st	3	18	8	6	4	29	17	30	Quarter-finals	
2021	1st	3	36	17	10	9	48	35	61	Round of 16	Conference League 1Q
2022	1st	3	36	17	8	11	48	35	59	Quarter-finals	Conference League 1Q
2023	1st	4	36	17	9	10	56	39	60	Quarter-finals	Conference League 3Q
2024	1st	3	36	19	11	6	58	30	68	Third round	
2025	1st	2	36	25	3	8	63	35	78	Winners	Conference League 2Q

=== European competitions ===
Dila debuted in UEFA competitions in 2004. Although the club did not obtain an Intertoto Cup slot based on their league position, they replaced a higher placed team, which abstained from the participation. After being held to a goalless draw at home, Marek Dupnitsa beat Dila in the return leg. Later the next decade there were three more cases when the Georgian side achieved relatively better results in away games than back home.

As the cup winners, the team reached Europe League play-offs in 2012. During this campaign Dila eliminated two opponents, including Anorthosis Famagusta, which was further subjected to UEFA sanctions for crowd disturbances occurred during their home game.

Dila similarly prevailed in two rounds of the competition the next year, before their road to the group stage was blocked by Rapid Vienna. The team's performance against Igor Tudor's Hajduk Split was widely hailed this season.

In next four cases the club wrapped up their European seasons after the first round.

Season	Competition	Round	Club	Home	Away	Aggregate
2004	UEFA Intertoto Cup	1Q	(Bulgaria) Marek Dupnitsa	0–2	0–0	0–2
2012–13	UEFA Europa League	2Q	(Denmark) AGF Aarhus	3–1	2–1	5–2
2012–13	UEFA Europa League	3Q	(Cyprus) Anorthosis Famagusta	0–1	3–0	3–1
2012–13	UEFA Europa League	PO	(Portugal) Marítimo	0–2	0–1	0–3
2013–14	UEFA Europa League	2Q	(Denmark) AaB	3–0	0–0	3–0
2013–14	UEFA Europa League	3Q	(Croatia) Hajduk Split	1–0	1–0	2–0
2013–14	UEFA Europa League	PO	(Austria) Rapid Wien	0–3	0–1	0–4
2015–16	UEFA Champions League	1Q	(Serbia) Partizan	0–2	0–1	0–3
2016–17	UEFA Europa League	1Q	(Armenia) Shirak	1–0	0–1	1–1 (Note: Shirak won 4–1 on penalties.)
2021–22	UEFA Europa Conference League	1Q	(Slovakia) Žilina	2–1	1–5	3–6
2022–23	UEFA Europa Conference League	1Q	(Finland) KuPS	0–0	0–2	0–2
2023–24	UEFA Europa Conference League	1Q	(Slovakia) DAC Dunajská Streda	2–0	1–2	3–2
2023–24	UEFA Europa Conference League	2Q	(Ukraine) Vorskla Poltava	3–1	1–2	4–3
2023–24	UEFA Europa Conference League	3Q	(Cyprus) APOEL	0–2	0–1	0–3
2025–26	UEFA Conference League	1Q	(Luxembourg) Racing Union	1−0	2–1	3–1
2025–26	UEFA Conference League	2Q	(Latvia) Riga	3–3	1–2	4–5
2026–27	UEFA Conference League	1Q	(San Marino) AC Virtus	3–1	0–1	3–2
2026–27	UEFA Conference League	2Q	(Cyprus) Apollon Limassol	0–4	0–3	0–7

Notes

- 1Q: First qualifying round
- 2Q: Second qualifying round
- 3Q: Third qualifying round
- PO: Play-off round

Fully up to date as of match played 9 July 2026

Competition	Pld	W	D	L	GF	GA
UEFA Champions League	2	0	0	2	0	3
UEFA Europa League	14	7	1	6	14	11
UEFA Europa Conference League	18	6	2	10	20	31
UEFA Intertoto Cup	2	0	1	1	0	2
Total	36	13	4	19	34	47

== Stadium ==
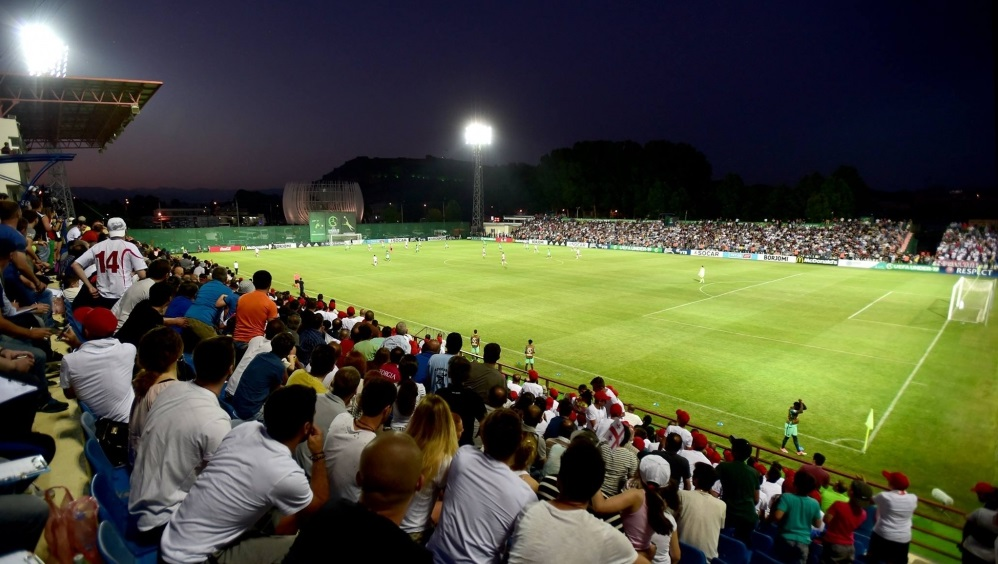
Tengiz Burjanadze Stadium

The club play their home matches at the Tengiz Burjanadze Stadium, a 5,000 seater football stadium situated in Gori.

== Crest and colours ==
The club's colors are Red and light blue.

=== Shirt sponsors and kit manufacturers ===
Period	Kit Supplier	Kit Sponsor
2010–2011	Saller	HeidelbergCement
2011–2012	Jako	
2012–2013	Nike	
2013–2014	Saller	AGP
2014–2015	Saller	Lider-Bet
2021–2022	Adidas	Marsbet

== Current squad ==
As of 16 August 2026

Note: Flags indicate national team as defined under FIFA eligibility rules; some limited exceptions apply. Players may hold more than one non-FIFA nationality.

No.	Pos.	Nation	Player
1	GK	GEO	Davit Kereselidze
2	DF	GEO	Tedo Kikabidze
5	MF	BEL	Maik Poeketie
6	MF	CIV	Claude Kouakou
8	MF	GEO	Lasha Menteshashvili
9	FW	GUI	Mohamed Kanté
10	MF	GEO	Otar Parulava
11	FW	LAT	Kristaps Grabovskis
12	GK	GEO	Luka Sanikidze
13	DF	BRA	João Araújo
14	DF	GEO	Giorgi Jalagonia
15	MF	GEO	Giorgi Kobakhidze
16	MF	GAM	Mamin Sanyang

No.	Pos.	Nation	Player
17	MF	GHA	Blankson Anoff
19	MF	GEO	Badri Gogoberishvili
21	FW	GEO	Zurab Museliani
22	FW	GEO	Shota Shekiladze
23	DF	GEO	Nikoloz Mali
24	MF	SEN	Mouhamed Diouf
25	DF	GER	Lamar Yarbrough
27	MF	SEN	Alioune Tall
29	MF	NGR	Malik Olatunji
31	GK	GEO	Mate Makrakhidze
33	DF	CGO	Ramaric Etou (Captain)
36	DF	GEO	Sandro Beruashvili

=== Out on loan ===
Note: Flags indicate national team as defined under FIFA eligibility rules; some limited exceptions apply. Players may hold more than one non-FIFA nationality.

No.	Pos.	Nation	Player
—	FW	GEO	Lekso Otinashvili (at Gori)

== Management ==
Position	Name
Chairman	Davit Koziashvili
Executive director	Giorgi Jokhadze
Sporting director	Vano Khorguashvili
Head coach	Akis Vavalis
Assistant head coach	Luka Khomasuridze
Goalkeeper coach	Ramaz Sogolashvili

== Honours ==
- Erovnuli Liga
  - Champions: 2014–15
  - Runners-up: 2012–13, 2025
  - Bronze medals: 2015–16, 2020, 2021, 2022, 2024
- Georgian Cup
  - Winners: 2011–12, 2025
- Georgian Super Cup
  - Winners: 2025
  - Runners-up: 2012, 2015

== Managers ==
Name	From	To
(Georgia (country)) Giorgi Tsetsadze	February 2010	October 2011
(Georgia (country)) Temur Makharadze	November 2011	March 2012
(Georgia (country)) Temur Shalamberidze	March 2012	September 2012
(Georgia (country)) (Israel) Giorgi Daraselia	July 2012	December 2012
(Lithuania) Valdas Ivanauskas	January 2013	May 2013
(Georgia (country)) Giorgi Devdariani	June 2013	October 2013
(Georgia (country)) Ramaz Sogolashvili	October 2013	May 2014
(Georgia (country)) Ucha Sosiashvili	May 2014	Jan 2017
(Israel) Ziv Avraham Arie	January 2017	June 2017
(Georgia (country)) Giorgi Dekanosidze	June 2017	July 2017
(Georgia (country)) (Israel) Giorgi Daraselia (2)	July 2017	August 2018
(Georgia (country)) Giorgi Shashiashvili	August 2018	December 2018
(Georgia (country)) Giorgi Dekanosidze (2)	January 2019	July 2019
(Georgia (country)) Georgi Nemsadze	August 2019	December 2020
(Ukraine) Andriy Demchenko	December 2020	August 2023
(Georgia (country)) Irakli Modebadze (interim)	August 2023	October 2023
(Argentina) Ever Demaldé	October 2023	December 2023
(Portugal) Rui Mota	January 2024	June 2024
(Portugal) Francisco Castro	July 2024	December 2024
(Portugal) Nuno Costa	January 2025	June 2025
(Italy) Diego Longo	June 2025	May 2026
(Georgia (country)) Levan Korgalidze	May 2026	June 2026
(Greece) Akis Vavalis	June 2026	

== Top goalscorers ==
Season	Name	Goals
2011–12	(Georgia (country)) Davit Chagelishvili	5
2012–13	(Georgia (country)) Roman Akhalkatsi (Georgia (country)) Irakli Modebadze	4
2013–14	(Georgia (country)) Irakli Modebadze	9
2014–15	(Georgia (country)) Irakli Modebadze	16
2015–16	(Georgia (country)) Otar Martsvaladze	19
2016	(Georgia (country)) Aleko Gamtsemlidze	3
2017	(Georgia (country)) Giorgi Pantsulaia	8
2018	(Ukraine) Mykola Kovtalyuk	21
2019	(Cape Verde) Alvin Fortes	8
2020	(Ukraine) Mykola Kovtalyuk	10
2021	(Georgia (country)) Tornike Kapanadze	10
2022	(Georgia (country)) Tornike Kapanadze	9
2023	(Barbados) Thierry Gale (Ukraine) Mykola Kovtalyuk	10
2024	(Netherlands) Tayrell Wouter	19
2025	(Georgia (country)) Shota Shekiladze	10
