= Rodolfo Aloko =

Beninese footballer (born 2006)

Personal information
- Date of birth: 26 December 2006 (age 19)
- Place of birth: Sô-Ava, Benin
- Height: 1.76 m (5 ft 9 in)
- Positions: Winger; forward

Team information
- Current team: Charlotte FC
- Number: 37

Senior career*
Years	Team	Apps	(Gls)
–2024	Dynamo Abomey		
2025	Kustošija	11	(2)
2025–2026	Crown Legacy FC	6	(8)
2025	→ Kustošija (loan)	3	(3)
2026–	Charlotte FC	23	(4)

International career^{‡}
2023	Benin U20	4	(1)
2022–	Benin	12	(3)
- * Club domestic league appearances and goals as of 20:46, 15 November 2026 (UTC) ‡ National team caps and goals as of 12 November 2026

Rodolfo Aloko (born 26 December 2006) is a Beninese professional footballer who plays as a winger or forward for Major League Soccer side Charlotte FC and the Benin national team.

== Early life ==
Aloko was born on 26 December 2006. He was born in Sô-Ava, Benin.

== Club career ==
Aloko started his career with the Abomey-based club Dynamo Abomey. In 2025, he signed for Druga nogometna liga club NK Kustošija based in Zagreb, for whom he made eleven league appearances and scored two goals. He made his debut for the club on 21 February 2025 against NK Trnje.

In September 2025, Aloko was signed by MLS Next Pro side Crown Legacy FC in a contract until 2029 with an option for 2030. For the remainder of 2025, he was loaned to NK Kustošija, for whom he made three league appearances and scored three goals.

It was announced he was signed by Major League Soccer side Charlotte FC on 10 April 2026 in a contract until June 2030 with a club option for the 2030–31 Major League Soccer season.

== International career ==
Aloko was called up to the Benin national under-20 football team by Mathias Déguénon for the 2023 U-20 Africa Cup of Nations, during which he made four appearances and scored one goal against Zambia.

Aloko made his debut for the Benin national team in June 2025 coming off the bench as a substitute in a match against Morocco. He was selected in the squad for the 2025 African Cup of Nations and made four appearances in the tournament.

=== International ===
As of 12 November 2026

Appearances and goals by national team and year
National team	Year	Apps	Goals
Benin	2022	1	0
Benin	2025	6	0
Benin	2026	5	3
Total		12	3

Scores and results list Benin's goal tally first, score column indicates score after each Aloko goal.

List of international goals scored by Rodolfo Aloko
No.	Date	Venue	Opponent	Score	Result	Competition
1	29 September 2026	Alassane Ouattara Stadium, Abidjan, Ivory Coast	Mauritania	1–0	2–1	2027 Africa Cup of Nations qualification
2	29 September 2026	Alassane Ouattara Stadium, Abidjan, Ivory Coast	Mauritania	2–0	2–1	2027 Africa Cup of Nations qualification
3	12 November 2026	Félix Houphouët-Boigny Stadium, Abidjan, Ivory Coast	Central African Republic	2–1	4–1	2027 Africa Cup of Nations qualification

== Honors ==
=== Individual ===
MLS Next Pro Player of the Month: March 2026
