= Mamadou Diallo (footballer, born 1996) =

Mauritanian footballer (born 1996)

Personal information
- Date of birth: 3 December 1996 (age 29)
- Place of birth: Nouakchott, Mauritania
- Height: 1.91 m (6 ft 3 in)
- Position: Forward

Team information
- Current team: CSKA 1948
- Number: 93

Senior career*
Years	Team	Apps	(Gls)
2018–2020	Bobigny-Bagnolet-Gagny	5	(1)
2020–2022	Le Blanc-Mesnil	25	(21)
2022–2023	Chambly Oise	23	(10)
2023–2024	US Boulogne	24	(9)
2024–2025	LB Châteauroux	29	(12)
2025–	CSKA 1948	43	(22)

International career^{‡}
2024–	Mauritania	8	(1)
- * Club domestic league appearances and goals as of 10:00, 5 November 2026 (UTC) ‡ National team caps and goals as of 24 September 2026

Mamadou Diallo (born 3 December 1996) is a Mauritanian professional footballer who plays as a forward for Bulgarian First League club CSKA 1948 Sofia.

== Club career ==
Diallo started his career with French side Football Club 93 Bobigny-Bagnolet-Gagny, where he made five league appearances and scored one goal. In 2020, he signed for French side Le Blanc-Mesnil Sport Football, where he made twenty-eight league appearances and scored twenty-one goals. Two years later, he signed for French side US Boulogne, where he made forty-one league appearances and scored eighteen goals.

Following his stint there, he signed for French side LB Châteauroux, where he made twenty-nine league appearances and scored twelve goals. On 13 September 2024, he scored a perfect hat-trick for the club during a 4–3 home win over US Quevilly-Rouen Métropole in the league. Ahead of the 2025–26 season, he signed for Bulgarian side FC CSKA 1948 Sofia. He finished the season as the joint top goalscorer in the league (shared with Everton Bala), netting 18 goals, while his team's second place in the table guaranteed qualification for the Conference League.

== International career ==
Diallo is a Mauritania international. During October 2024, he played for the Mauritania national football team for 2025 Africa Cup of Nations qualification, making his debut on 11 October after coming on as a late second half substitute in the 0:2 away loss against Egypt.

== Style of play ==
Diallo plays as a forward and is right-footed. French news website Africafootunited.com wrote in 2024 that he "can rely on his imposing 1.91 m stature and his mastery of aerial play to unbalance opposing defenses".

== Career statistics ==
=== Club ===
As of match played 11 August 2026

Appearances and goals by club, season and competition
Club	Season	League			National cup (Note: Includes Coupe de France, Bulgarian Cup)		Continental		Total	
Club	Season	Division	Apps	Goals	Apps	Goals	Apps	Goals	Apps	Goals
Boulogne	2023–24	Championnat National 2	8	9	1	1	–		9	10
LB Châteauroux	2024–25	Championnat National	29	12	0	0	–		29	12
CSKA 1948	2025–26	Bulgarian First League	35	18	2	2	–		37	20
CSKA 1948	2026–27	Bulgarian First League	3	3	0	0	4 (Note: Appearances in UEFA Conference League)	0	7	3
CSKA 1948	Total		38	21	2	2	4	0	44	23
Career total			75	42	3	3	4	0	82	45

=== International goals ===
List of international goals scored by Mamadou Diallo
No.	Date	Venue	Opponent	Score	Result	Competition
1.	24 September 2026	Larbi Zaouli Stadium, Casablanca, Morocco	Central African Republic	3–1	3–1	2027 Africa Cup of Nations qualification

== Honours ==
Individual

- Bulgarian First League top goalscorer: 2025–26
