= Shota Shekiladze =

Georgian association football player

Personal information
- Date of birth: 15 February 2000 (age 26)
- Place of birth: Zestaponi, Georgia
- Position: Forward

Team information
- Current team: Dila
- Number: 22

Youth career
- Zestaponi

Senior career*
Years	Team	Apps	(Gls)
2018–2022	Locomotive	59	(3)
2021	→ Telavi (loan)	34	(5)
2023	Zhenis	5	(2)
2023	Zestaponi	9	(6)
2024–	Dila	75	(19)
- * Club domestic league appearances and goals as of 10 December 2025

Shota Shekiladze (Georgian: შოთა შეყილაძე, born 15 February 2000) is a Georgian footballer who plays as an attacker for Erovnuli Liga club Dila.

He is the winner of the national cup and the super cup.

== Career ==
Shekiladze spent his youth career at his hometown club Zestaponi. In 2017, he shone in the U17 Golden League championship as a topscorer, bagging 44 goals and helping the team to finish as runners-up. In early next year, he moved to Tbilisi to sign for Locomotive. He made his debut for the senior team as a second-half substitute on 8 December 2018 in a 1–0 win over Rustavi.

Shekiladze scored his first top-division goal on 29 May 2019 when he came off the bench to help the team snatch a last-gasp victory over Chikhura.

In 2020, Shekiladze featured in six games only which forced him to sign a loan move to Telavi in an effort to get more playing time. During the 2021 season, he took part in 34 league games and given his impact was at one point named as Player of the Month by football outlet goal.ge.

Following Locomotive's relegation from the Erovnuli Liga in 2022, Shekiladze was among seven players who left the club. He moved to Kazakhstan's 2nd division side Zhenis where he netted six goals in first three league and cup games.

In early October 2023, Shekiladze returned to Zestaponi for two months. During this period, he scored six times to prolong his team's Liga 3 tenure for another year.

In January 2024, Shekiladze joined Dila, becoming the 2nd most valuable player of the season with nine goals and three assists. The next year, he was the first league player to score a hat-trick as Dila ran riot against Telavi. Later this year, he won the Georgian Cup and the super cup.

== International ==
While still at Zestaponi, Shekiladze was called up to the Georgian U18 team for friendly fixtures in 2017. A year later, he was a member of the U19 team which took part in 2019 UEFA European Under-19 Championship qualification campaign.

== Statistics ==
As of match played 6 May 2026

Appearances and goals by club, season and competition
Club	Season	League			National cup		Continental		Other		Total	
Club	Season	Division	Apps	Goals	Apps	Goals	Apps	Goals	Apps	Goals	Apps	Goals
Locomotive	2018	Erovnuli Liga	1	0	–		–		–		1	0
Locomotive	2019	Erovnuli Liga	19	1	3	0	–		–		22	1
Locomotive	2020	Erovnuli Liga	6	0	1	0	–		–		7	0
Locomotive	2022	Erovnuli Liga	33	2	2	0	–		–		35	2
Locomotive	Total		59	3	6	0	0	0	0	0	65	3
Telavi (loan)	2021	Erovnuli Liga	34	5	1	0	–		–		35	5
Zhenis	2023	Kazakhstan First Division	5	2	3	4	–		–		8	6
Zestaponi	2023	Liga 3	9	6	–		–		–		9	6
Dila	2024	Erovnuli Liga	33	9	1	0	–		–		34	9
Dila	2025	Erovnuli Liga	35	10	3	1	4	0	2	0	44	11
Dila	2026	Erovnuli Liga	7	0	0	0	0	0	0	0	7	0
Dila	Total		75	19	4	1	4	0	2	0	79	20
Career total			182	35	14	5	4	0	2	0	196	40

== Honours ==
Dila

- Georgian Cup: 2025
- Georgian Super Cup: 2025
