= Giorgi Dekanosidze =

Georgian footballer

Personal information
- Date of birth: 2 January 1981 (age 45)
- Place of birth: Tbilisi, Georgian SSR
- Height: 1.74 m (5 ft 8 1/2 in)
- Position: Midfielder

Team information
- Current team: Georgia U21 (assistant coach)

Senior career*
Years	Team	Apps	(Gls)
1998–2000	TSU Tbilisi	32	(5)
2000	WIT Georgia	15	(2)
2000–2003	SpVgg Greuther Fürth	13	(0)
2003–2004	WIT Georgia	31	(2)
2004–2008	Ameri Tbilisi	94	(18)
2008–2009	Olimpi Rustavi	19	(0)
2009–2010	Sioni Bolnisi	14	(0)
2010	Kolkheti-1913 Poti	2	(0)

International career
2001–2003	Georgia U21	11	(2)
2007	Georgia	2	(0)

Managerial career
- 2017: Dila Gori (assistant coach)
- 2017–18: Telavi
- 2019: Dila Gori
- 2020: Dinamo Tbilisi (assistant coach)
- 2020–2021: Locomotive (assistant coach)
- 2022–2023: Dinamo Tbilisi (assistant coach)
- * Club domestic league appearances and goals

Giorgi Dekanosidze (Georgian: გიორგი დეკანოსიძე; born 2 January 1981) is a retired Georgian professional football midfielder who currently works as Georgia U21 assistant manager.

Dekanosidze was the head coach of 2nd division side Telavi between August 2017 and December 2018. In January 2019, he took charge of top-tier club Dila for eight months. Later Dekanosidze twice took up the position of assistant manager at Dinamo Tbilisi.
