= Lavié-Agoviépé =

- Town
- Location within Togo
- Coordinates: 6.876°N 0.730°E
- Country: Togo
- Region: Plateaux Region
- Prefecture: Haho

Lavié-Agoviépé is an area located in Togo. It contains Lavié and Agoviépé.

It is notable as it is the home of the Kotoko F.C., who play at the Stade Municipal in Lavié.
