= Akis Vavalis =

Greek football manager (born 1985)

Personal information
- Date of birth: 21 September 1985 (age 41)
- Place of birth: Serres, Greece
- Position: Defender

Team information
- Current team: Dila (head coach)

Senior career*
Years	Team	Apps	(Gls)
2003–2009	Vihren		
- Visaltiakos

Managerial career
- 2011–2012: Panserraikos (assistant)
- 2012–2014: Lokomotiv (assistant)
- 2014–2015: Aris Akropotamos (assistant)
- 2015–2016: Panetolikos (assistant)
- 2016–2017: Iraklis (assistant)
- 2017–2018: Asteras (assistant)
- 2018–2019: Aris (assistant)
- 2019–2020: Atromitos (assistant)
- 2021: Atromitos (assistant)
- 2022: Vasalund
- 2022: Krumovgrad
- 2022–2023: Lamia (assistant)
- 2023: Drita
- 2024–2025: Zhenis
- 2025–2026: Montana
- 2026–: Dila Gori
- * Club domestic league appearances and goals

Akis Vavalis (Greek: Άκης Βάβαλης; born 21 September 1985) is a Greek professional football manager and former footballer, currently in charge of Erovnuli Liga club Dila.

== Playing career ==
In 2003, Vavalis signed for Bulgarian side Vihren, helping the club achieve promotion from the second tier to the top flight. Six years later, he signed for Greek side Visaltiakos. However, he retired from playing professional football due to injury. Afterwards, he studied in Plovdiv, Bulgaria.

== Managerial career ==
During January 2022, Vavalis was appointed manager of Swedish side Vasalund. The same year, he was appointed manager of Krumovgrad Bulgarian side Krumovgrad before being appointed as an assistant manager of Greek side Lamia.

Subsequently, he was appointed manager of Kosovan side Drita, helping the club achieve second place in the league. Following his stint there, he was appointed manager of Kazakhstani side Zhenis, helping the club reach the final of the 2024 Kazakhstan League Cup.

In June 2026, Vavalis took charge of the reigning Georgian Cup holders Dila.
