= Tovio =

- Industry: Sportswear and Sports Goods
- Founded: 1994
- Founder: Thomas Olivier Viho
- Headquarters: Ouagadougou, Burkina Faso
- Products: Sportswear
- Website: www.toviosport.com www.toviosport.ma

Tovio is a Burkinabé sportswear and equipment supplier was founded on 1994 in Ouagadougou, Burkina Faso.

== Current sponsorship ==
=== Football ===
==== National teams ====
- Burkina Faso
- Niger

==== Club teams ====
- (Burkina Faso) Etoile Filante Ouagadougou
- (Ivory Coast) ES Bingerville
- (Ivory Coast) Victoria F.C.

=== Handball ===
==== National teams ====
- Burkina Faso

=== Basketball ===
==== National teams ====
- Chad

==== Club teams ====
- (Morocco) Raja Casablanca
- (Ivory Coast) Olympique Basketball Center

=== Federations ===
- (Burkina Faso) Ministère des Sports et des Loisirs
- (Burkina Faso) Union Sportive des Scolaires et Universitaires
- (Ivory Coast) FIMADA

=== Volleyball ===
==== National teams ====
- Niger
