= Edmé Codjo =

Beninese football manager

Managerial career
- Years: Team
- 2005–07: Benin national football team
- 2011–12: Benin national football team

Edmé Codjo was a Beninese manager of the Benin national football team from August 2011 to January 2012.

== Career ==
He had previously been in charge of the national team during the 2008 Africa Cup of Nations qualification campaign.
