= World XI =

Association football team representing the world

- Association: FIFA

First international
- England 2–1 FIFA World XI (London, England; 23 October 1963) (Note: England 3–0 Rest of Europe XI, London, England, 26 October 1938. Rest of Europe is sometimes recorded as FIFA)

Biggest win
- Spain 0–3 FIFA World XI (Madrid, Spain; 27 September 1967); Europe XI 2–5 FIFA World XI (Marseille, France; 4 December 1997)

Biggest defeat
- Italy 6–2 FIFA World XI (Rome, Italy; 16 December 1998); France 5–1 FIFA World XI (Marseille, France; 16 August 2000)

The World XI, also known as the FIFA World Stars, is an association football scratch team consisting of players from various countries. The World XI play one-off games against clubs, national teams, collectives of continental teams.

The official first match of the FIFA World XI was held against England on the 100th anniversary of the Football Association – 23 October 1963. The World lost 2–1 in front of a crowd of 100,000. Prior to this, matches had been played in 1947 against the United Kingdom in Scotland (to celebrate the four British national teams returning to FIFA, with the proceeds going to the world governing body) and against England in 1953 (for the Football Association's 90th anniversary – in fact all the players were from continental Europe).

FIFA has organised several World XI squads to compete in various commemorative exhibitions and charity testimonials, but in its own documentation, the only official World Stars Games listed are those against national, pan-continental or representative teams; its matches against club teams including New York Cosmos, Hamburger SV, Benfica, Anderlecht, Flamengo, Barcelona, Manchester United and Real Madrid are not included.
On 18 July 2007, the World XI faced an Africa XI with both teams unusually composed of retired players.

The Women's World XI first played on 14 February 1999 at Spartan Stadium in San Jose, California, United States, for the draw of the 1999 FIFA Women's World Cup, defeating the United States 2–1.

== Results ==
=== 1960s ===
23 October 1963

England	2–1	FIFA World XI
Paine 66'; Greaves 90'	Report	Law 82'

Wembley Stadium, London
Attendance: 100,000
Referee: Bobby Davidson (Scotland)

Centenary of the (English) Football Association

27 September 1967

Spain	0–3	FIFA World XI
	Report	Mazzola 23'; Eusébio 82'; Goyvaerts 88'

Santiago Bernabéu, Madrid
Attendance: 35,000
Referee: José María Ortiz (Spain)

65th birthday of Ricardo Zamora

6 November 1968

Brazil	2–1	FIFA World XI
Rivellino 20'; Tostão 90'	Report	Albert 33'

Maracanã Stadium, Rio de Janeiro
Attendance: 93,000
Referee: Diego Di Léo (Brazil)

10th anniversary of Brazil's first World Cup title (1958)

=== 1970s ===
19 December 1973

(Note: Brazil participated in the game as the unofficial team of FUGAP.)Brazil XI	2–1	FIFA World XI
Pelé 40'; Luis Pereira 65'	Report	Brindisi 2'

Maracanã Stadium, Rio de Janeiro
Attendance: 131,000
Referee: Armando Marques (Brazil)

Farewell game for Garrincha

25 June 1979

Argentina	1–2	FIFA World XI
Maradona 28'	Report	Galván 68' (o.g.); Zico 73'

Estadio Monumental, Buenos Aires
Attendance: 82,000
Referee: Abraham Klein (Israel)

1st Anniversary of Argentina's first World Cup victory (1978)

=== 1980s ===
7 August 1982

Europe XI	3–2	FIFA World XI
Keegan 58'; Pezzey 79'; Antognoni 88'	Report	Zico 29'; Belloumi 35'

Giants Stadium, East Rutherford, New Jersey
Attendance: 76,900
Referee: David Socha (United States)

FIFA Charity Match for UNICEF

27 July 1986

Americas XI	2–2	FIFA World XI
Cabañas 81'; Maradona 88'	Report	Butcher 15'; Rossi 59'
Penalties
Negrete (penalty missed); Falcão (penalty scored); Alemão (penalty scored); Cabañas (penalty scored); Maradona (penalty scored)	4–3	(penalty scored) Rossi; (penalty scored) Lerby; (penalty missed) Amoros; (penalty scored) Strachan; (penalty missed) Park Chang-sun

Rose Bowl, Pasadena
Attendance: 57,600
Referee: David Socha (United States)

FIFA Charity Match for UNICEF

=== 1990s ===
8 October 1991

Germany	3–1	FIFA World XI
Beiersdorfer 29'; Effenberg 35'; Ruggeri 38' (o.g.)	Report	Stoichkov 27'

Olympiastadion, Munich
Attendance: 38,000
Referee: Rosario Lo Bello (Italy)

FIFA Charity Match for UNICEF

14 July 1996

Brazil	2–1 (Note: 1996: Bebeto was voted the MVP.)	FIFA World XI
Bebeto 48'; Roberto Carlos 78'	Report	Klinsmann 69'

Giants Stadium, East Rutherford, New Jersey
Attendance: 78,416
Referee: Arturo Brizio (Mexico)

FIFA Charity Match for SOS Children's Villages

3 July 1997

Asia XI	3–5	FIFA World XI
Azizi 11'; Al-Enazi 74'; Bagheri 79'	Report	Weah 18'; Alfonso 25'; Şükür 32'; Reyna 53'; Papin 68'

Hong Kong Stadium, Hong Kong
Attendance: 23,000
Referee: Ali Bujsaim (United Arab Emirates)

Hong Kong Reunification Cup

18 August 1997

Russia	0–2	FIFA World XI
	Report	Djorkaeff 52'; Guerrero 78'

Luzhniki Stadium, Moscow
Attendance: 55,000
Referee: Pierluigi Collina (Italy)

Russian Football Centennial Match

4 December 1997

Europe XI	2–5	FIFA World XI
Lăcătuș 2'; Zidane 60'	Report	de Ávila 16'; Ronaldo 22', 43'; Batistuta 30', 37'

Stade Vélodrome, Marseille
Attendance: 38,000
Referee: Gilles Veissière (France)

FIFA Charity Match for SOS Children's Villages; the event also preceded the draw for the 1998 FIFA World Cup

9 September 1998

Turkish League XI (Turkey)	4–4	FIFA World XI
Baljić 24', 45' (pen.); Demirci 66'; Davala 87'	Report	Hagi 28', 70', 94' (pen.); Papin 74'

BJK İnönü Stadium, Istanbul
Attendance: 15,000
Referee: Gamal Al-Ghandour (Egypt)

75th Anniversary of the founding of the Turkish Republic and the Turkish Football Federation

16 December 1998

Italy	6–2	FIFA World XI
F. Inzaghi 9'; Di Francesco 36'; Fuser 40'; Chiesa 56', 79', 85'	Report	Batistuta 20'; Weah 22'

Stadio Olimpico, Rome
Attendance: 21,352
Referee: Rémi Harrel (France)

Centenary of the FIGC (Italian Football Federation)

12 June 1999

Australia	3–2	FIFA World XI
Zelic 46'; Emerton 57'; Margas 66' (o.g.)	Report	Murat Yakin 9'; Rufer 88'

Olympic Stadium, Sydney
Attendance: 88,101
Referee: Masayoshi Okada (Japan)

Official opening of Stadium Australia

17 August 1999

Africa XI	2–2	FIFA World XI
Bwalya 51', 89'	Report	Häßler 52'; Moravčík 63'

Ellis Park, Johannesburg
Attendance: 35,000
Referee: Ndoya Falla (Senegal)

Farewell game for Nelson Mandela

=== 2000s ===
25 April 2000

Bosnia and Herzegovina	0–1	FIFA World XI
	Report	R. Baggio 83' (pen.)

Kosevo Stadium, Sarajevo
Attendance: 25,000
Referee: Günther Benkö (Austria)

"Football For Peace"

16 August 2000

France	5–1	FIFA World XI
Trezeguet 11', 27', 46'; Pires 56'; Anelka 78'	Report	R. Baggio 79' (pen.)

Stade Velodrome, Marseille
Attendance: 60,000
Referee: Mohammed Guezzaz (Morocco)

Charity Match for SOS Children's Villages

3 January 2001

Japan–South Korea XI	1–1	FIFA World XI
Ko Jong-soo	Report	Prosinecki

Yokohama International Stadium, Japan
Attendance: 46,740

World Dream Soccer Exhibition

12 December 2002

FIFA World XI	3–3	Real Madrid
Klose 30'; Kaká 42'; Cissé 48'	Report	Solari 60' (pen.); Tote 65'; Cambiasso 86'

Bernabéu, Madrid
Attendance: 55,000
Referee: Mejuto González (Spain)

100th anniversary of Real Madrid

15 February 2005

Shevchenko XI (Europe)	3–6	Ronaldinho XI (World)
Del Piero 26'; Zola 50'; Suazo 54'	Report	Eto'o 14', 45'; Camara 19', 64'; Ronaldinho 60'; Cha Du-ri 79'

Camp Nou, Barcelona
Attendance: 35,000
Referee: Pierluigi Collina (Italy)

Football for Hope (Indian Ocean Tsunami funds)

== Other games ==
=== 1991 ===
29 October 1991

Argentina	3–0	FIFA World XI
Latorre 32' 69'; Rodríguez 40'

Estadio Monumental, Buenos Aires
Referee: Abel Gnecco (Argentina)

Friendly

18 December 1991

Kuwait	0–2	FIFA World XI (Note: FIFA World XI in Kuwait: Tacconi; Apostolakis, Dunga, Saravakos, Ruben Sosa, Carlos Valderrama, Enzo Francescoli, Tanju Çolak. Coach: Sebastiao Lazaroni.)
		Saravakos 32'

Stadio Renato Curi, Perugia

Anniversary Friendly a year after the Gulf War

=== 1995 ===
30 August 1995

Americas XI	5–1	FIFA World XI
Hermosillo 7', 17', 38'; Medina Bello 43'; Dunga 69'	Report	Protasov 4'

Japan National Stadium, Tokyo, Japan
Attendance: 42,888

Kobe Earthquake Benefit Match

=== 1997 ===
27 April 1997

Europe XI	3–4	FIFA Rest of World XI
Mancini 40' 65'; Stoichkov 79'	Report	del Solar 75'; Mafla 78'; Branco 85'; Kanu 88'

Monjuic Stadium, Barcelona
Attendance: 5,200
Referee: Robert Wurtz (Germany)

AIFP match

=== 2004 ===
29 November 2004

Barcelona	4–3	FIFA World XI
Iniesta 14'; Deco 26'; Messi 30'; Belletti 82'	Report	Nakata 17'; McCarthy 49'; Petrov 86'

Camp Nou, Barcelona

Goals against AIDS

=== 2008 ===
22 December 2008

FIFA World XI	2–1	Iraq
Eranio 13', 26'	Report	Mohammed 39'

San Siro, Milan
Referee: Massimiliano Saccani

Un goal per la pace

=== Goodwill Games ===
7 August 1994

Russia	2–1	World All-Stars
Tetradze 22'; Radimov 87'	Report	Genchev 49'

Kirov Stadium, Saint Petersburg
Attendance: 78,000
Referee: Vadim Zhuk (Belarus)

=== Christmas matches ===
==== 1992 ====
30 December 1992

AC Milan	4–2	FIFA World Stars
Evani; Aldo Serena; Massaro	Report	Papin; Sergio Berti

San Siro, Milan
Attendance: 40,000

Christmas Charity match for UNICEF's Somalian refugees

==== 1993 ====
29 December 1993

AC Milan	5–3	FIFA World Stars
Savicevic 15' 34'; Angelo Carbone 27'; Papin 41'; Orlando 70'	Report	Hugo Sanchez 17'; Luis Oliveira 68'; Daoudi 82' pen.

San Siro, Milan
Attendance: 42.569
Referee: Treossi (Italy)

Christmas Charity match for UNICEF

==== 1994 ====
28 December 1994

AS Roma	2–1	FIFA World Stars
Moriero 32'; Statuto 35'	Report	Vlaović 89'

Stadio Olimpico, Rome
Attendance: 25.120

Christmas Charity match

30 December 1994

AC Milan	2–3 (Note: Giannis Kallitzakis was the MVP)	FIFA World Stars
Boban; Di Canio	Report	Tab Ramos; Machlas 90'

San Siro, Milan
Attendance: 23,000

Christmas Charity match for UNICEF's children

=== Farewells ===
==== 1989 ====
27 March 1989

Brazil	1–2	FIFA World XI
Dunga 5'	Report	Francescoli 34'; Détari 65'

Stadio Friuli, Udine
Referee: Luigi Agnolin (Italy)

Farewell game for Zico

==== 1990 ====
31 October 1990

Brazil	1–2	FIFA World XI
Neto 60'	Report	Michel 35'; Hagi 49'

Giuseppe Meazza, Milan
Referee: Tullio Lanese (Italy)

Pelé's 50th Birthday

==== 1995 ====
20 July 1995

Brazil	3–3	FIFA World XI

Estadio Jalisco, Guadalajara

Farewell match for Dirceu

==== 1996 ====
21 May 1996

Germany	3–1	Rudi Voller's World XI (Note: 1996 Rudi Voller's Team (or World XI) starters were: 3. Brehme, 4.Berthold, 5. Buchwald, 6.Desideri, 7.Littbarski, 8.Matthaus, 9.Rizzitelli, 10.Giannini, 13.Voller. Subs were: 15. Amedeo Carboni. Coach: Otto Reehaggel. Rudi Voller played for both sides.)
Bobic 12'; Völler 62'; Basler 85' pen.		Giannini 40'

BayArena, Leverkusen

Farewell game for Rudi Voller

==== 1999 ====
30 May 1999

France	2–2	FIFA World XI
Youri Djorkaeff 59'; Nicolas Anelka 77'	Report	Jorg Albertz 57'; Lilian Laslandes 75'

Stade Velodrome, Marseille
Attendance: 60,000

Jean-Pierre Papin Testimonial

11 October 1999

Manchester United	2–4 (Note: After 68 minutes the entire Rest of the World XI was substituted for a team consisting of former Manchester United stars including Mark Hughes who scored twice. World XI: Schmeichel (46' Pascal Olmeta), Cafu, Fernando Couto, Zinedine Zidane, Gabriel Batistuta, Cantona (46' Careca), Vialli, Weah)	FIFA World XI
Teddy Sheringham 44'; Paul Scholes	Report	Gianluca Vialli 10'; Careca 50'; Mark Hughes 74' 84'

Old Trafford, Manchester
Attendance: 54,842

Alex Ferguson Testimonial

==== 2001 ====
24 April 2001

Romania	2–2	FIFA World XI (Note: 2001 Romania's dream team coached by Mircea Lucescu consisted of Hagi, Dan Petrescu, and Viorel Moldovan, Popescu, Filipescu, Rotariu, Marius Baciu, Dumitrescu, Stelea, Belodedici, Chivu, Mutu, Contra. World XI coached by Radomir Antic: Taffarel (Dida), Mihajlo Pjanovic, Nenad Lalatovic, Capone, Chendo, Sanchis, Bulent Korkmaz, Miroslav Karhan, Carlos Dunga, Robert Prosinecki, Okan, Hakan Sukur.)
Moldovan; Rotariu	Report	Okan; Pjanovic

Lia Manoliu stadium, Bucharest
Attendance: 60.000

Gheorghe Hagi´s farewell

10 November 2001

Argentina	6–3	FIFA World XI
López 16'; Aimar 50', 85'; Maradona 60' (pen.), 90' (pen.); Castromán 70'	Report	Šuker 30'; Cantona 80'; Higuita 89' (pen.)

La Bombonera, Buenos Aires, Argentina
Attendance: 55.000
Referee: Juan Bava (Argentina)

Farewell game for Diego Maradona

==== 2003 ====
11 November 2003

Cameroon	3–1	FIFA World XI (Note: 2003 World XI (or Friendship team") was coached by Man.City Kevin Keegan, Lyon's Paul Le Guen and former RC Lens trainer Daniel Leclercq, consisted of Thierry Henry, Robert Pires, Sylvain Wiltord, Nicolas Anelka, Sonny Anderson, and others.)
Mboma; Eto'o; Modeste M'bami	Report	Sonny Anderson

Stade de Gerland, Lyon
Attendance: 23,962

Marc-Vivien Foe tribute

21 December 2003

San Lorenzo	4–2	FIFA World XI
Alberto Acosta		Francescoli

Nuevo Gasómetro, San Lorenzo
Attendance: 25.000

Alberto Acosta farewell

22 December 2003

Chile	2–5	FIFA World XI (Note: 2003 World XI: Chilavert, Ivan Cordoba, Javier Zanetti, Andres D'Alessandro, Carlos Valderrama, David Pizarro, Claudio Husain, Santiago Solari, Ronaldo. Zamorano played a half for each team.)
	Report	Zamorano 4'; Ronaldo 6'; Solari 66'; David Pizarro 76'

Estadio Nacional Julio Martínez Prádanos, Santiago
Attendance: 60,000

Ivan Zamorano farewell

==== 2004 ====
1 February 2004

Colombia	3–3	FIFA World XI (Note: 2004: Colombian XI (Hernan Dario Gomez: Jose Marca Pazos (Eduardo Niio, 46), Luis Fernando Herrera (Wilmer Cabrera, 46), Alexis Mendoza (Gabriel Martinez, 46), Carlos Mario Hoyos (Carlos Vives, 19, Ricardo Perez, 46), Wilson Perez (Alberto Gamero, 46), Leonel Alvarez (Luis Zuleta, 46), Mauricio Serna (Juan Carlos Abello, 60), Carlos Valderrama (Kenny Valderrama-77), Alan Ronald Valderrama (Didc Valderrama, 46), Ivan Valenciano (Adolfo Valencia, 46) and Faustino Asprilla (David Ferreira, 46). World Friends (Julio Avelino Comesaia and Perfecto Rodriguez): José Luis Chilavert, Jorge Soto, Jose Soto, Javier Margas, Rafael VillazUn (Claudio Rodriguez, 22, Claudio Juuregui, 60), Alex Aguinaga, Enzo Francescoli (Raul Diaz Arce, 62) Marco Etcheverry, Alberto Acosta, Ratl Dcaz Arce (Jorge Campos, 46) and Ivan Zamorano (Pablo Sabat-73). Valderrama missed a penalty on 36. Diego Maradona watched the match from the stands as he could not play because of a knee ailment. The referee ended the match on 82.)
Wilson Perez 16'; Iván Valenciano 32'; Valderrama 56'	Report	José Soto 22'; Alberto Acosta 40'; Claudio Juuregui 72'

Estadio Metropolitano Roberto Meléndez, Barranquilla
Attendance: 60,000
Referee: Jesus Diaz (Colombia)

Carlos Valderrama farewell

15 November 2004

Velez Sarsfield	2–1	FIFA World XI
Chilavert pen; Bassedas		Zamorano

José Amalfitani Stadium, Sarsfield

José Luis Chilavert farewell

17 May 2004

Romania	3–2	FIFA World XI (Note: 2004 All-Star World Team' included Claudio Taffarel, Hristo Stoichkov and Josep Guardiola, and Romanians Gheorghe Hagi and Dan Petrescu.)
Florin Bratu 55'; Ioan Ganea	Report	Andriy Vorobei; Tommasi

Ion Oblemenco Stadium, Craiova
Attendance: 27,000

Gheorghe Popescu´s farewell

==== 2011 ====
11 January 2011

Nigeria	3–1	African FIFA World XI (Note: Kanu played for both sides. The World XI (actually made of Africans), managed by Stephen Keshi and Jo Bonfrere included: Peterside Idah; Jean Makoun, Khalilou Fadiga, Anthony Baffoe, Jay-Jay Okocha, Sammy Kuffour, George Boateng, Joseph Yobo, Taye Taiwo, Herman Hreidarsson and Obinna Nsofor, Samuel Eto'o (c), Emmanuel Adebayor, Sulley Muntari, Rigobert Song and Emmanuel Eboue. While Yakubu Ayegbeni made an appearance for Nigeria.)
Kanu; Uche	Report	Adebayor

National Stadium, Lagos
Attendance: 14,000

Nwankwo Kanu´s farewell

=== Legends games ===
1 July 2007

Hong Kong–China XI	2–0	FIFA World XI
Zhao Xuri 41'; Shao Jiayi 52'	Report

Hong Kong Stadium, Hong Kong
Attendance: 38,077
Referee: Cheung Yim Yau (Hong Kong)

Reunification Cup - celebration of the 10th Anniversary of Hong Kong's reunification with China

18 July 2007

Africa XI	3–3	FIFA World XI
Abedi Pele 9'; H. Hassan 30', 50'	Report	Zamorano 6'; Gullit 44'; Guerrero 72'

Newlands Stadium, Cape Town
Attendance: 35,412
Referee: Abdul Ebrahim (South Africa)

90 Minutes for Mandela

=== Women's games ===
14 February 1999

United States	1–2	FIFA Women's World XI
Foudy 24'	Report	Hooper 55', 61'

Spartan Stadium, San Jose
Attendance: 15,367
Referee: Sonja Denoncourt (Canada)

First ever women's World Stars match played to coincide with the official draw for the 1999 FIFA Women's World Cup USA

20 May 2004

Germany	2–3	FIFA Women's World XI
Prinz 27'; Garefrekes 44'	Report	Moström 16'; Svensson 48'; Akide 71'

Stade de France, Paris
Attendance: 41,000
Referee: Nicole Petignat (Switzerland)

FIFA Centennial Match

21 April 2007

China	3–2	FIFA Women's World XI
Liu Sa 14'; Han Duan 27'; Ji Ting 90'	Report	Pohlers 4'; Salisbury 42'

Wuhan Sports Center Stadium, Wuhan
Attendance: 31,000
Referee: Tammy Ogston (Australia)

Match played to coincide with the official draw for the FIFA Women's World Cup China 2007

== Squads ==
Date	Opponent	Goalkeepers	Defenders	Midfielders	Forwards	Ref.
23 October 1963	England	(Soviet Union) Lev Yashin (Socialist Federal Republic of Yugoslavia) Milutin Šoškić	(Brazil) Djalma Santos (Chile) Luis Eyzaguirre (West Germany) Karl-Heinz Schnellinger (Czechoslovakia) Ján Popluhár	(Czechoslovakia) Josef Masopust (Scotland) Jim Baxter (Czechoslovakia) Svatopluk Pluskal	(France) Raymond Kopa (West Germany) Uwe Seeler (Scotland) Denis Law (Portugal) Eusébio (Hungary) Ferenc Puskás (Spain) Francisco Gento (Spain) Alfredo Di Stéfano	
27 September 1967	Spain	(Italy) Giuliano Sarti (England) Peter Bonetti	(Italy) Tarcisio Burgnich (West Germany) Karl-Heinz Schnellinger (Uruguay) Julio César Benítez	(Scotland) Ian Ure (Scotland) Charlie Cooke (Italy) Gianni Rivera (Portugal) Mário Coluna	(Sweden) Kurt Hamrin (Italy) Sandro Mazzola (Portugal) Eusébio (Belgium) Fernand Goyvaerts (Italy) Mario Corso	
6 November 1968	Brazil	(Soviet Union) Lev Yashin (Uruguay) Ladislao Mazurkiewicz	(Hungary) Dezső Novák (Hungary) Lajos Szűcs (Soviet Union) Albert Shesternyov (West Germany) Willi Schulz (West Germany) Franz Beckenbauer (Argentina) Silvio Marzolini (Argentina) Roberto Perfumo	(Germany) Wolfgang Overath (Uruguay) Pedro Rocha	(Spain) Amancio Amaro (Soviet Union) Slava Metreveli (Hungary) Flórián Albert (Socialist Federal Republic of Yugoslavia) Dragan Džajić (Hungary) János Farkas	
19 December 1973	Brazil XI	(Argentina) Edgardo Andrada	(Uruguay) Pablo Forlán (Soviet Union) Sergei Olshansky (Brazil) Alex Kamianecky (Uruguay) Ángel Brunell (Soviet Union) Evgeny Lovchev	(Paraguay) Francisco Reyes (Argentina) Eduardo Dreyer (Uruguay) Pedro Rocha (Argentina) Carlos Babington	(Argentina) René Houseman (Argentina) Miguel Ángel Brindisi (Argentina) Narciso Doval (Soviet Union) Volodymyr Onyshchenko	
25 June 1979	Argentina	(Brazil) Émerson Leão (Austria) Friedrich Koncilia	(West Germany) Manfred Kaltz (Italy) Antonio Cabrini (Brazil) Toninho (Austria) Bruno Pezzey (Netherlands) Ruud Krol	(Italy) Marco Tardelli (France) Michel Platini (Brazil) Zico (Spain) Juan Manuel Asensi	(Italy) Franco Causio (Italy) Paolo Rossi (Poland) Zbigniew Boniek	
7 August 1982	Europe XI	(Cameroon) Thomas N'Kono	(Peru) Jaime Duarte (Brazil) Oscar (Brazil) Júnior	(Bolivia) Erwin Romero (Brazil) Falcão (Brazil) Sócrates (Brazil) Zico (Algeria) Lakhdar Belloumi (United States) Rick Davis	(Mexico) Hugo Sánchez (Italy) Giorgio Chinaglia (Kuwait) Faisal Al-Dakhil	
27 July 1986	Americas XI	(Northern Ireland) Pat Jennings (Soviet Union) Rinat Dasayev	(France) Manuel Amoros (England) Terry Butcher (Belgium) Michel Renquin	(Scotland) Gordon Strachan (Denmark) Søren Lerby (West Germany) Felix Magath (West Germany) Uli Stielike (South Korea) Park Chang-sun (Switzerland) Heinz Hermann	(France) Dominique Rocheteau (Morocco) Mohamed Timoumi (Italy) Paolo Rossi (Soviet Union) Igor Belanov	
8 October 1991	Germany	(Argentina) Sergio Goycochea (Colombia) René Higuita	(Brazil) Carlos Mozer (Argentina) Oscar Ruggeri (Brazil) Ricardo Gomes (Brazil) Jorginho (United States) Desmond Armstrong	(England) Chris Waddle (South Korea) Kim Joo-sung (Netherlands) Ruud Gullit (Captain) (Socialist Federal Republic of Yugoslavia) Dragan Stojković (Colombia) Carlos Valderrama (Turkey) Rıza Çalımbay	(Liberia) George Weah (Chile) Iván Zamorano (Bulgaria) Hristo Stoichkov (Czechoslovakia) Tomáš Skuhravý	
14 July 1996	Brazil U23	(Mexico) Jorge Campos (Chile) Nelson Tapia	(Spain) Fernando Hierro (Portugal) Fernando Couto (France) Marcel Desailly (South Africa) Mark Fish (Australia) Ned Zelic	(United States) John Harkes (Bulgaria) Krasimir Balakov (Denmark) Michael Laudrup (Ghana) Abedi Pele (Argentina) Fernando Redondo (Germany) Lothar Matthäus (Captain) (France) David Ginola	(Germany) Jürgen Klinsmann (Japan) Kazuyoshi Miura (Liberia) George Weah	
3 July 1997	Asia XI	(Germany) Andreas Köpke (South Africa) Andre Arendse	(Spain) Fernando Hierro (Netherlands) Frank Verlaat (Germany) Lothar Matthäus	(Brazil) Dunga (Uzbekistan) Sergey Lebedev (Brazil) Zé Elias (United States) Claudio Reyna (South Korea) Ha Seok-ju	(Liberia) George Weah (Turkey) Hakan Şükür (France) Jean-Pierre Papin (Spain) Alfonso Pérez	
18 August 1997	Russia	(Spain) Andoni Zubizarreta (Germany) Uwe Gospodarek	(Switzerland) Ramon Vega (Netherlands) Frank Verlaat (Mexico) Claudio Suárez (Russia) Akhrik Tsveiba	(Germany) Lothar Matthäus (Captain) (France) Youri Djorkaeff (Spain) Julen Guerrero (Germany) Stefan Effenberg (Netherlands) Aron Winter (Ghana) Abedi Pele	(France) Jean-Pierre Papin (Ukraine) Andriy Shevchenko (Russia) Vladimir Beschastnykh	
4 December 1997	Europe XI	(Cameroon) Jacques Songo'o (Paraguay) Rubén Ruiz Díaz	(South Korea) Hong Myung-bo (Chile) Javier Margas (Morocco) Noureddine Naybet (South Africa) David Nyathi (Saudi Arabia) Hussein Abdulghani	(Mexico) Marcelino Bernal (Japan) Hidetoshi Nakata (Tunisia) Adel Sellimi	(Colombia) Antony de Ávila (United States) Eric Wynalda (Brazil) Ronaldo (Captain) (Jamaica) Deon Burton (Argentina) Gabriel Batistuta	
9 September 1998	Turkey XI	(Brazil) Cláudio Taffarel (Cameroon) Jacques Songo'o	(Cameroon) Pierre Njanka (Denmark) Jes Høgh (Albania) Ilir Shulku (Romania) Gheorghe Popescu (Iran) Mehdi Pashazadeh	(Scotland) Paul Lambert (Socialist Federal Republic of Yugoslavia) Dragan Stojković (South Africa) John Moshoeu (Romania) Gheorghe Hagi (Brazil) Dunga	(Spain) Julen Guerrero (France) Jean-Pierre Papin	
16 December 1998	Italy	(Italy) Gianluca Pagliuca (Nigeria) Ike Shorunmu	(Brazil) Zé Maria (South Africa) David Nyathi (Spain) Fernando Hierro	(Japan) Hidetoshi Nakata (Brazil) Dunga (Captain) (Portugal) João Pinto (Netherlands) Aron Winter (Spain) Julen Guerrero (Portugal) Rui Costa (France) Zinedine Zidane	(Liberia) George Weah (Mexico) Luis Hernández (Brazil) Ronaldo (Croatia) Davor Šuker (Germany) Oliver Bierhoff (Argentina) Gabriel Batistuta (Chile) Marcelo Salas	
12 June 1999	Australia	(France) Bernard Lama (Mexico) Jorge Campos	(Cameroon) Rigobert Song (Brazil) Júlio César (Nigeria) Taribo West (Chile) Javier Margas (South Africa) Lucas Radebe (Egypt) Hany Ramzy (Switzerland) Murat Yakin	(England) Matt Le Tissier (Russia) Ilya Tsymbalar (Turkey) Okan Buruk (Brazil) Leonardo Araújo	(New Zealand) Wynton Rufer (South Africa) Shaun Bartlett (Italy) Christian Vieri (Italy) Marco Branca (Germany) Jürgen Klinsmann (Captain)	
17 August 1999	Africa XI	(Mexico) Jorge Campos (Cameroon) Jacques Songo'o (Liberia) Louis Crayton	(Saudi Arabia) Saleh Al-Dawod (Norway) Stig Inge Bjørnebye (United States) Jeff Agoos (Brazil) Branco (Mexico) Claudio Suárez (Nigeria) Taribo West	(France) Christian Karembeu (Brazil) Dunga (Captain) (Germany) Thomas Häßler (Slovakia) Ľubomír Moravčík (Ghana) Abedi Pele (Morocco) Mustapha Hadji	(Ecuador) Eduardo Hurtado (France) Jean-Pierre Papin	
25 April 2000	Bosnia and Herzegovina	(France) Bernard Lama (Nigeria) Ike Shorunmu	(Brazil) Aloisio (Brazil) César Belli (Egypt) Ibrahim Hassan (Cameroon) Pierre Njanka (Russia) Viktor Onopko (Mexico) Claudio Suárez (Netherlands) Frank Verlaat (Nigeria) Taribo West	(Brazil) Dunga (Captain) (Germany) Thomas Häßler (Ghana) Abedi Pele (Morocco) Mustapha Hadji (Iran) Mehdi Mahdavikia	(Brazil) Sonny Anderson (Italy) Roberto Baggio (Iran) Ali Daei (China) Su Maozhen	
16 August 2000	France	(Germany) Andreas Köpke (Cameroon) Jacques Songo'o	(Ghana) Samuel Kuffour (Italy) Ciro Ferrara (Brazil) Aldair (Netherlands) Frank Verlaat (Ivory Coast) Saliou Lassissi (Cameroon) Pierre Njanka (Cameroon) Rigobert Song (Cameroon) Geremi (Nigeria) Taribo West	(Brazil) Dunga (Brazil) Zé Elias (Netherlands) Aron Winter (Tunisia) Zoubeir Baya (Japan) Hidetoshi Nakata (Saudi Arabia) Khaled Al-Muwallid (Guinea) Pablo Thiam (South Korea) Yoo Sang-chul	(China) Su Maozhen (Italy) Roberto Baggio (Captain)	

=== Lineups ===
Date	Team	Lineup
8 October 1991	Germany	(Berti Vogts): Illgner (Köpke), Kohler, Binz, Reuter, Beiersdorfer, Brehme (Effenberg), Hässler, Möller (Bein), Matthäus (captain), Völler, Klinsmann (Thom)
8 October 1991	FIFA World XI	(Bobby Robson): Goycoechea, Oscar Ruggeri, Ricardo, Jorginho, Mozer, Armstrong (Skuhravy), Stojkovic (Calimbay), Waddle (Valderrama), Weah (Joo-Sung-Kim), Gullit (captain), Stoichkov (Zamorano).
27 April 1997	Europe XI	(Guy Roux): Stanley Menzo (Frode Grodås, Laurent Blanc (46' Eusebio), Ronald Koeman (46' Jordi Cruyff), Thomas Berthold, Georges Grun, Christian Karembeu, Eric Cantona (captain), Hristo Stoichkov, Gianluca Vialli (46' Elvir Bolić), Roberto Mancini, Tomas Brolin
27 April 1997	FIFA Rest of World XI	(Sócrates): Navarro Montoya (46' Rene Higuita ), Jose del Solar, Branco, Smahi Triki, José Basualdo, Oscar Ruggeri, Edison Mafla, Paulo Silas, Aurelio Vidmar (55' Nwankwo Kanu), Diego Maradona (captain) (60' Charles Wittl, Giovane Élber (46' Gabriel Okolosi).
18 August 1997	Russia All Stars	Ovchinnikov (Cherchesov, 46), Kovtun (Pagayev, 46), Nikiforov (Chugainov, 46), Popov, Kosolapov (Yanovskiy, 46), Kanchelskis (Grishin, 46), Onopko (captain), Alenichev (Kharlachyov, 46), Kolyvanov (Tikhonov, 46), Veretennikov, Simutenkov (Cheryshev, 46).
18 August 1997	FIFA World XI	(Bobby Robson and Bora Milutinović): Zubizarreta (Gospodarek, 46), Vega, Suárez, Verlaat, Matthäus (captain), Djorkaeff (Tsveiba, 78), Guerrero, Winter, Papin (Abédi Pelé, 46), Effenberg, Shevchenko (Beschastnykh, 58).
4 December 1997	Europe XI	(Franz Beckenbauer): Andreas Köpke (46' Frode Grodås, Heimo Pfeifenberger, Alessandro Costacurta, Fernando Hierro (46' Søren Colding), Dominique Lemoine (46' Gordon Durie), Paul Ince, Zinedine Zidane (captain), Krasimir Balakov, Marius Lacatus, Patrick Kluivert (46' Slaviša Jokanović), Alen Boksic
4 December 1997	FIFA Rest of World XI	(Carlos Alberto Parreira): Jacques Songo’o (Rubén Ruiz Díaz), Hong Myung-Bo, Javier Margas, Nourredine Naybet, David Nyathi, Marcelino Bernal, Hidetoshi Nakata, Adel Sellimi, Gabriel Batistuta, Ronaldo (captain), Antony de Ávila. Subs: Hussein Abdulghani, Nwankwo Kanu, Deon Burton, Eric Wynalda, Mehdi Pashazadeh
29 November 2004	Barcelona	(Frank Rijkaard): Víctor Valdés - Damiá, Carles Puyol (captain), Navarro, Giovanni van Bronckhorst - Deco, Dani Fragoso, Iniesta - Ludovic Giuly, Cristian, Ronaldinho. Subs: Belletti, Messi
29 November 2004	FIFA World Stars XI	(Johan Cruyff): Jorge Campos (46' Abbiati); Ostlund, Kompany, Pochetino (46' Van Buyten), Carboni (46' Michalis Kapsis), Obodo (46' Escudé), Baraja (46' Andrés D'Alessandro), Hidetoshi Nakata (71' Jorge Campos), Uche (46' Delron Buckley), Bojinov (46' Benny McCarthy), Michael Owen (46' Stiliyan Petrov).: Also: (Fernando Torres, Anelka, Brocchi, Barthez, Maldini and Lizarazu were invited but they couldn't travel).
15 February 2005	Europe XI	(Marcello Lippi and Arsène Wenger): Iker Casillas, Montero, Kaladze, Thuram, Gerrard, Diesler, Beckham, Zidane, Alessandro Del Piero, Raul, Shevchenko (captain). Subs: Mahdavikia, Park Ji-sung, Kameni, Martins, Henri Camara, Jaïdi, Buckley, Beasley, Cha Duri, Cris, Heinze, Lúcio, Zanetti, Adriano, Cambiasso, Drogba, Emerton, Essien, Juninho, Li Tie, Ronaldo
15 February 2005	FIFA Rest of World XI	(Carlos Alberto Parreira and Frank Rijkaard ): Dida, Cafu, Cordoba, Marquez, Radebe, Song, Nakata, Deco, Kaka, Ronaldinho (captain), Eto'o. Subs: Kompany, Kuffour, Giuly, Toldo, Vogel, Sükür, Litmanen, Gianfranco Zola, David Suazo, Henry, Buffon, Karembeu, Puyol, Maldini, Stam, Roberto Baggio, Ballack, Totti, Nedvěd, Vieira, Sema

==== Christmas matches ====
Date	Team	Lineup
30 December 1992	AC Milan	(Fabio Capello): Sebastiano Rossi (74′ Carlo Cudicini), Tassotti, Enzo Gambaro, De Napoli, Stefano Nava, Franco Baresi (c), Lentini I (64′ Serena), Donadoni, Marco Simone (46′ Albertini), Evani, Massaro.
30 December 1992	FIFA World Stars	(Nils Liedholm): Taffarel (46′ Casanova), John Sivebaek (80′ Dubovski), Blanc (80′ Panadic), Zvonimir Boban (46′ David Ginola, 74′ Rosenthal), Glonek (46′ Germain), Sabau (46′ Sforza, 74′ Sergio Berti), Dejan Savicevic (46′ Hagi), Rijkaard (46′ Sammer), Jean-Pierre Papin (57′ Elber, 74′ Luis Oliveira), Ruud Gullit (c) (46′ Lajos Detari), Careca (46′ Davor Suker, 74′ Raducioiu).
29 December 1993	AC Milan	(Fabio Capello): Sebastiano Rossi (46′ Ielpo), Mauro Tassotti (captain) (73′ Sadotti), Alessandro Orlando, De Napoli, Stefano Nava, F. Galli, Lentini I, Desailly (46′ Panucci, 56′ Costacurta), Jean-Pierre Papin (46′ Massaro), Dejan Savicevic (66′ D’Aversa), Angelo Carbone
29 December 1993	FIFA World Stars	(Francisco Maturana): Jorge Campos (46′ Wilfred), Martinsen (46′ Rimba), Jose Chamot (46′ Sabau), Ruud Gullit (captain) (35′ Sforza, 61′ Kalusha Bwalya), Sensini (46′ Lasas), Onopko (35′ Shin Hong Gi, 61′ El Khalej Tahar), Brian Laudrup (61′ Daoudi), Ilie Dumitrescu (46′ Makanaki, 82′ Rapaijc), Hugo Sanchez (46′ Nikos Machlas, 82′ Goran Vlaovic), Rincon (46′ Tomas Brolin), Kazu Miura (50′ Luis Oliveira, 78′ Stanic).
28 December 1994	Roma	(Carlo Mazzone): Cervone, Annoni (46′ Colonnese), Benedetti, Francesco Statuto (46′ Piacentini), Petruzzi, Carboni (68′ Borsa), Francesco Moriero (46′ Maini), Thern, Cappioli, Giuseppe Giannini (c), Francesco Totti.
28 December 1994	FIFA World Stars	(Nils Liedholm): Ladic (46' Eriksson), Zeman, Marcelo Balboa, Zoran Jovanovski (46' Patrick Berger), Igor Štimac (46' Li Bing), Andre Cruz, Luis Oliveira (46' Kenneth Andersson), Tab Ramos (46' Julio Dely Valdés), Papin (46' Harazi), Hong Myung Bo (46' Nikos Machlas), Kazu Miura (46' Vlaović)
30 December 1994	AC Milan	(Fabio Capello): Sebastiano Rossi (46′ Ielpo), Panucci (70′ Coco), Maldini (54′ Tassotti), Zvonimir Boban (46′ Albertini), Costacurta (46′ Stefano Nava), Baresi (31′ Galli), Lentini, Stroppa (46′ Eranio), Melli (46′ Sordo), Massimo Orlando, Paolo Di Canio
30 December 1994	FIFA World Stars	(Nils Liedholm): Tacconi (46' Ladic), Arteaga (46' Nikos Machlas), Vladimír Kinder, Igor Štimac (46' Hong Myung Bo), Kalitzakis, Marcelo Balboa (46' Zeman), Lardín (6' Patrick Berger), Hristo Stoičkov (c) (46' Danut Lupu, Glenn Hélder (46' Tab Ramos), Asanović, Richard Witschge (46' Li Bing)

== Statistics ==
=== Selections ===
Testimonial and legends' matches are not included.

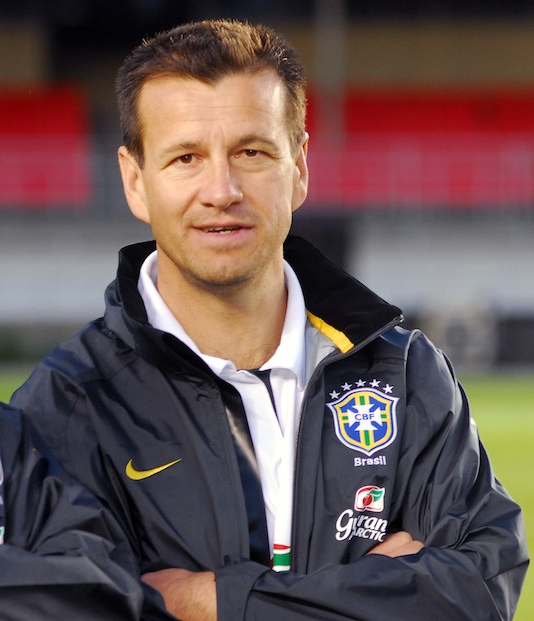
Dunga, the most selected player with six times

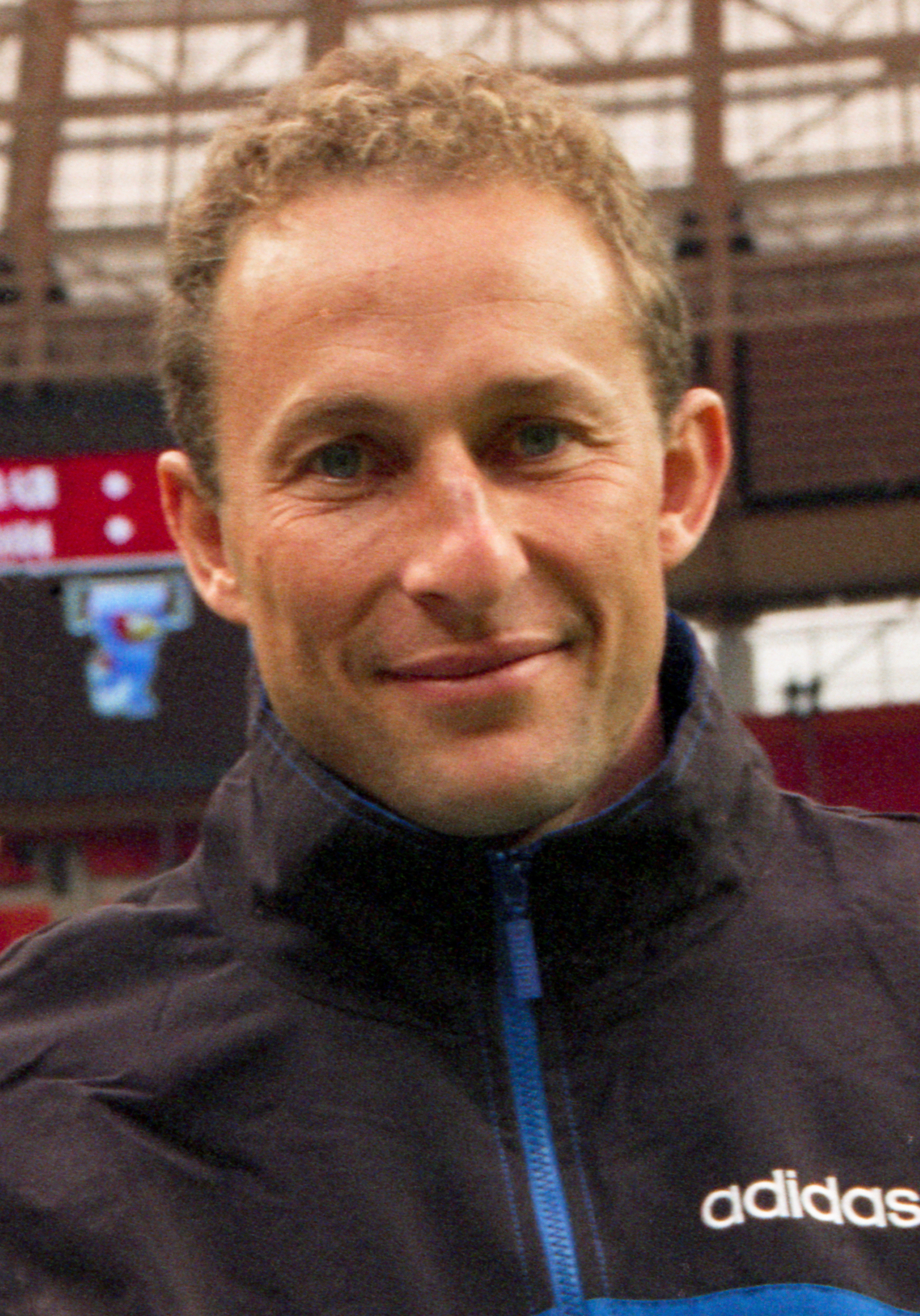
Jean-Pierre Papin was selected five times

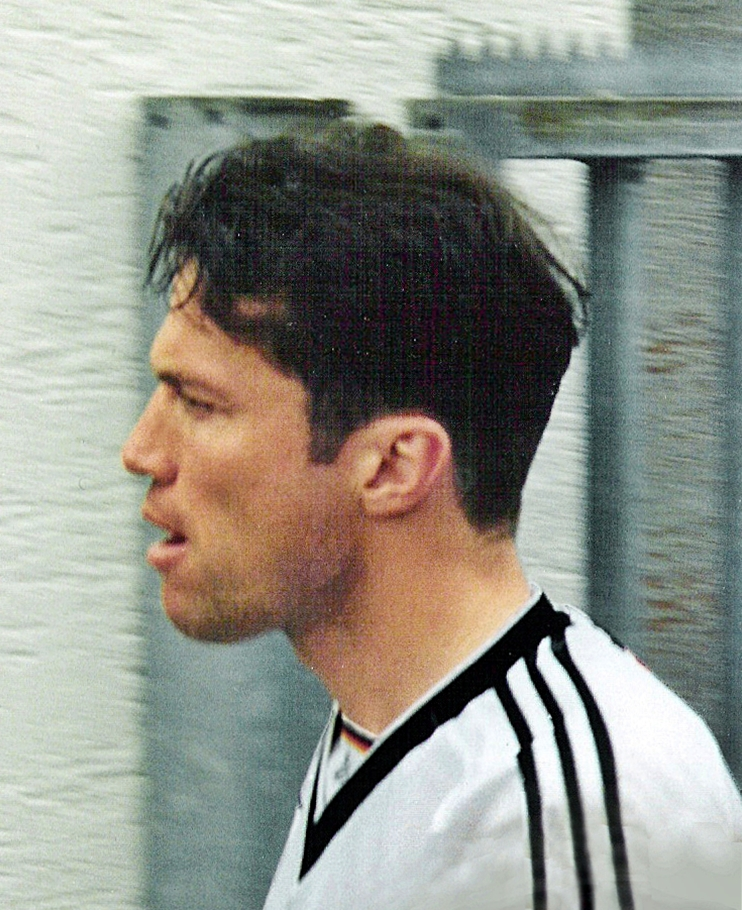
Lothar Matthaus was selected five times

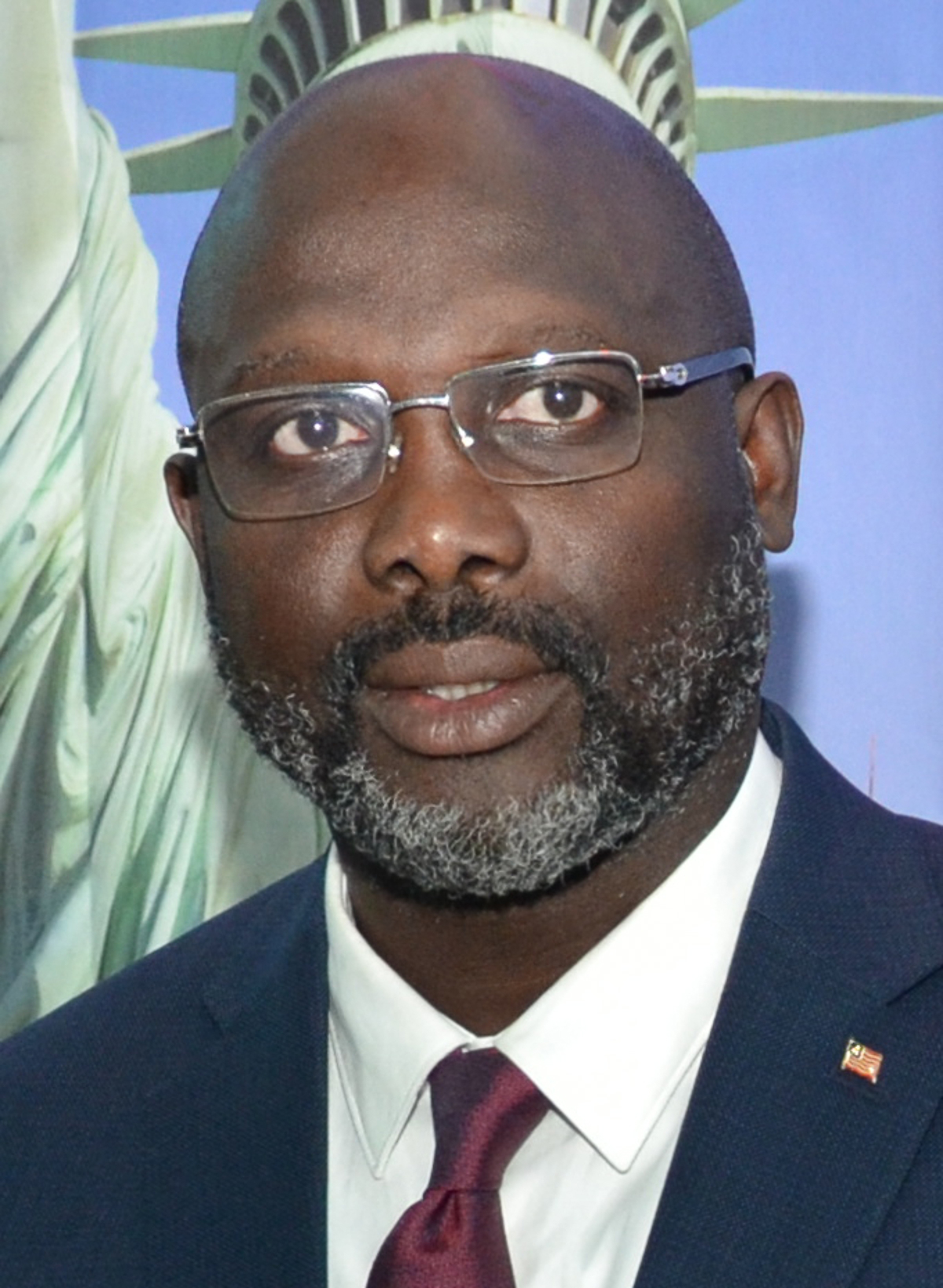
George Weah was selected four times

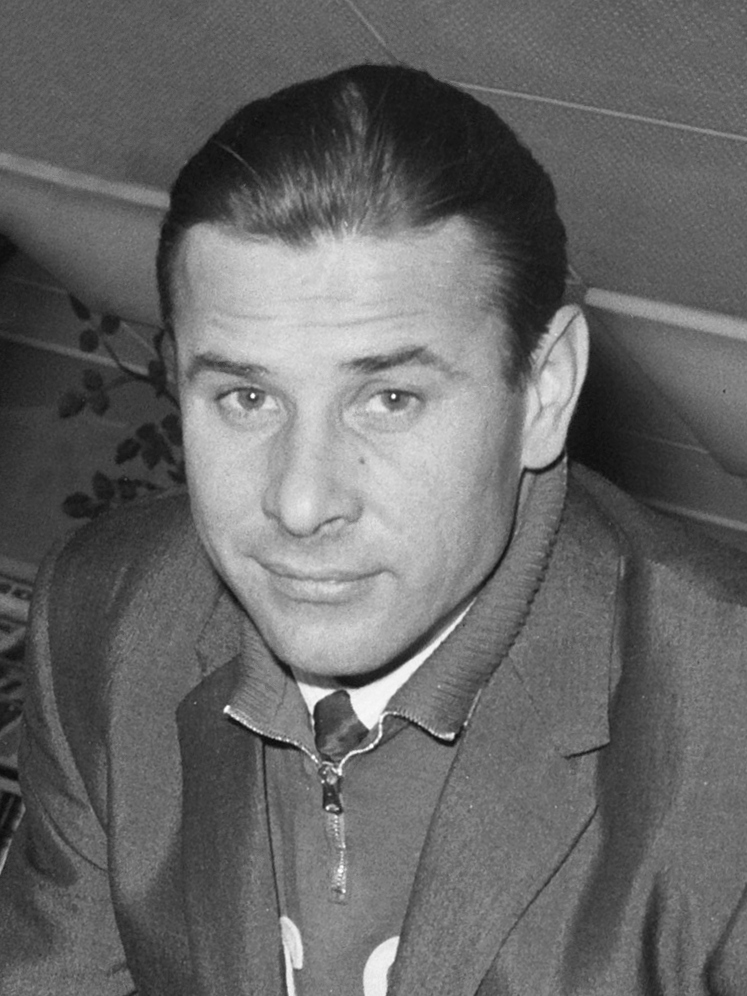
Lev Yashin was first selected in 1963, totalising two times

Player	Sel.	Matches played	Opp.	Notes
(Brazil) Carlos Dunga	6	1997, 1998 (I), 1998 (II), 1999, 2000 (I), 2000 (II),	1995	1995: America XI 5-1 Rest of the World XI (Kobe Earthquake benefit). In 2001 he played in Gheorghe Hagi's farewell
(Germany) Lothar Matthaus	5	1996, 1997 (I), 1997 (II), 1999	1991	1991: FIFA XI 1-3 Germany and He also played in: 2001: Maradona's farewell, and 1996: Rudi Voller's farewell
(Japan) Hidetoshi Nakata	5	1997, 1998, 2000, 2002, 2004	2001	2001: FIFA XI 1-1 Japan & Korea XI
(Liberia) George Weah	4	1991, 1996, 1997, 1998		In 1999: Manchester United 2-4 Rest of the World XI (Alex Ferguson Testimonial)
(France) Jean-Pierre Papin	4	1997 (I), 1997 (II), 1998, 1999 (I)		1999: France 2-2 World XI (Jean-Pierre Papin Testimonial)
(Netherlands) Frank Verlaat	4	1997 (I), 1997 (II), 2000 (I), 2000 (I)	1998	1999: France 2-2 World XI (Jean-Pierre Papin Testimonial)
(Cameroon) Jacques Songo'o	4	1997, 1998, 1999, 2000		
(Netherlands) Aron Winter	4	1997, 1998, 2000, 2001		
(Mexico) Jorge Campos	4	1996, 1999 (I), 1999 (II), 2004	1995	1995: America XI 5-1 Rest of the World XI (Kobe Earthquake benefit)
(Italy) Roberto Baggio	4	2000 (I), 2000 (II), 2002, 2005		
(Ghana) Abedi Pele	3	1996, 1997, 1999		
(Nigeria) Taribo West	3	1999 (I), 1999 (II), 2000		
(Ghana) Abedi Pele	3	1996, 1997, 1999		
(Argentina) Gabriel Batistuta	2	1997, 1998		1999: Manchester United 2-4 Rest of the World XI (Alex Ferguson Testimonial)
(Turkey) Hakan Sukur	2	1997, 2005		In 2001: Gheorghe Hagi's farewell
(Italy) Paolo Maldini	2	2002, 2005	1998	In 1999: France 2-2 World XI (Jean-Pierre Papin Testimonial). 1998: FIFA XI 2-6 Italy
(Spain) Fernando Hierro	3	1996, 1997 (I), 1998	1997 (II)	1997: 11 - FIFA XI 5-2 European Team
(Colombia) Rene Higuita	2	1991, 1997, and 2001		1997: Europe XI 3-4 World XI (AIFP match). In 2001: Maradona's farewell
(Soviet Union) Lev Yashin	2	1963, 1968	1971	1971 Yashin's farewell: Soviet Dynamo 1-1 World XI
(Brazil) Zico	2	1979, 1982	1989, 1990, 1995	1989: Brazil 1-2 Rest of the World XI (Zico's farewell), 1990: Flamengo 2-2 World XI (Zico's farewell) 1995: Brazil XI 3-3 Rest of the World XI (Dirceu Guimarães's farewell)
(Brazil) Ronaldo	2	1997, 1998 and 2003	1996	1996: FIFA XI 1-2 Brazil. In 2003: Zamorano testimonial
(Germany) Jürgen Klinsmann	2	1996, 1999	1991, 1996	1991: FIFA XI 1-3 Germany, 1996: Voller testimonial
(Portugal) Eusebio	2	1963, 1967	1973	1973 : Benfica 2-2 World XI (Eusebio's farewell)
(Socialist Federal Republic of Yugoslavia) Dragan Stojković	2	1995, 1998		1995: America XI 5-1 Rest of the World XI (Kobe Earthquake benefit)
(France) Christian Karembeu	2	1999, 2005	1997, 2000	1997:Europe XI 3-4 World XI (AIFP match), 2000: FIFA XI 1-5 France
(Germany) Michael Ballack	2	2002, 2005		
(France) Zinedine Zidane	2	1998, 2005 and 1999 (Testimonial)	1997, 1999, 2000, 2002	1997: FIFA XI 5-2 European Team, 2002: FIFA XI 3-3 Real Madrid and 2000: FIFA XI 1-5 France,. In 1999: Manchester United 2-4 Rest of the World XI (Alex Ferguson Testimonial)
(Argentina) Oscar Ruggeri	2	1991, 1997		1997: Europe XI 3-4 World XI (AIFP match)
(Brazil) Branco	2	1997, 1999		1997: Europe XI 3-4 World XI (AIFP match)

=== Most goals ===
Testimonial and legends' matches are not included.

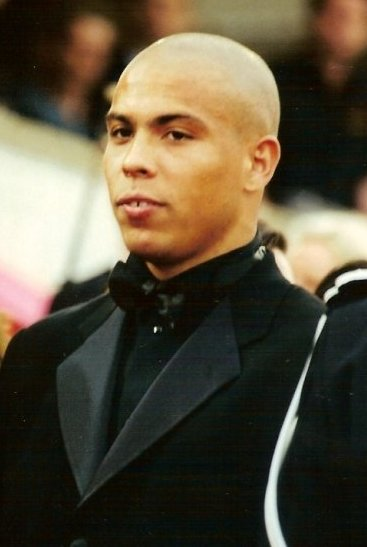
Ronaldo scored 2 goals for FIFA XI in December 1997

Player	Goals for World XI	Selections	Goals for the opposition	Notes
(Romania) Gheorghe Hagi	3 (1998)	1		
(Argentina) Gabriel Batistuta	3 (1997, 1998)	2		
(France) Jean-Pierre Papin	3 (1997, 1998, 1999)	4		
(Brazil) Ronaldo	2 (1997)	2		
(Liberia) George Weah	2 (1997, 1998)	4		
(Brazil) Zico	2 (1979, 1982)	2		
(Italy) Roberto Baggio	2 (2000)	4		

=== List of captains ===
The list includes all matches.

Period	Team Captain	Notes
1991-1993	(Netherlands) Ruud Gullit	
1994	(Poland) Zbigniew Boniek (ret.)	Goodwill Games
1994	(Bulgaria) Hristo Stoichkov	
1995	(Socialist Federal Republic of Yugoslavia) Dragan Stojković	As Rest of World against Americas XI
1996-1997	(Germany) Lothar Matthaus	
1997	(Brazil) Ronaldo Lima	
1998-2000	(Brazil) Carlos Dunga	
1999	(Germany) Jurgen Klinsmann (ret.)	Australia match
2000	(Italy) Roberto Baggio	

=== List of Coaches ===
The list includes all matches.

Period	Coach	Notes
1991	(England) Bobby Robson	
1991	(Brazil) Sebastiao Lazaroni	Against Kuwait
1992	(Sweden) Nils Liedholm	Christmas Stars
1993	(Colombia) Francisco Maturana	Christmas Stars
1994	(Germany) Udo Lattek	Goodwill Games
1994	(Sweden) Nils Liedholm	Christmas Stars
1995	(England) Roy Hodgson and (Germany) Pierre Littbarski	Against Americas XI
1996	(Denmark) Richard Moller Nielsen	
1997	(Brazil) Sócrates	as Rest of World
1997	(Socialist Federal Republic of Yugoslavia) Bora Milutinovic and (Slovakia) Jozef Venglos	Against Asia XI
1997	(England) Bobby Robson and (Socialist Federal Republic of Yugoslavia) Bora Milutinovic	
1998	(Brazil) Carlos Alberto Parreira	
1999	(England) Roy Hodgson	Against Australia
1999	(England) Roy Hodgson and (Netherlands) Ruud Gullit	Against Africa XI
2005	(Brazil) Carlos Alberto Parreira and (Slovakia) Jozef Venglos	Against Turkey XI
2004	(Netherlands) Johan Cruyff	Against Barcelona
2005	(Brazil) Carlos Alberto Parreira and (Netherlands) Frank Rijkaard	as Ronaldinho XI/Rest of World

== See also ==
- Football for Hope
- Match Against Poverty
- Russia vs World All-Stars (1994)
- 90 Minutes for Mandela
- Soccer Aid
- Rest of the world in sports and games

== Sources ==
- All FIFA XI Matches at fifa.com
