= Svatopluk Pluskal =

Czech footballer (1930–2005)

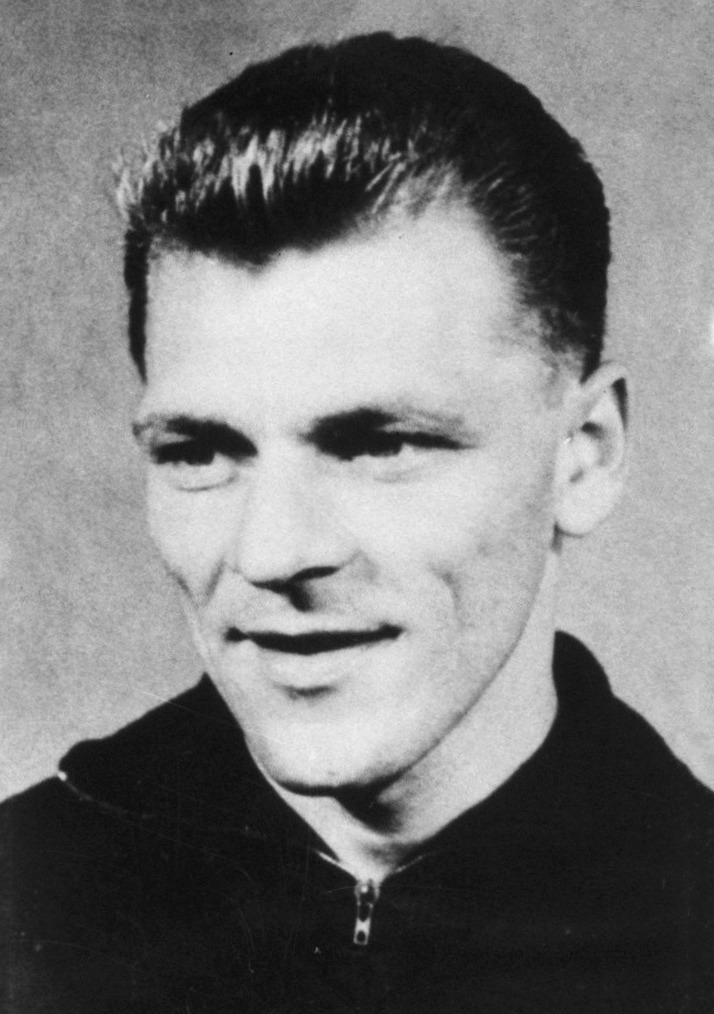
- Pluskal in 1962

Personal information
- Date of birth: 28 October 1930
- Place of birth: Zlín, Czechoslovakia
- Date of death: 29 May 2005 (aged 74)
- Place of death: Ústí nad Labem, Czech Republic
- Position: Defensive midfielder

Senior career*
Years	Team	Apps	(Gls)
1947–1951	SK Letná Zlín		
1952–1966	Dukla Prague	282	(37)
1966–1967	LIAZ Jablonec		

International career
1952–1965	Czechoslovakia	56	(1)

Managerial career
- 1969–1970: Bohemians Prague
- 1971–1974: Enosis Neon Paralimni
- 1976–1978: Enosis Neon Paralimni
- 1978–1979: Škoda Plzeň
- 1983–1985: Enosis Neon Paralimni
Medal record
Men's football
Representing Czechoslovakia
FIFA World Cup
Runner-up	1962 Chile
- * Club domestic league appearances and goals

Svatopluk Pluskal (28 October 1930 – 29 May 2005) was a Czech footballer who played as a defensive midfielder. He won a silver medal at the World Cup in Chile in 1962, representing Czechoslovakia.

== Early life ==
Svatopluk Pluskal started playing football in his home town, where he played for several clubs. With (Baťa Zlín – Svit Gottwaldov) he achieved promotion to the top league. He achieved individual success when he was selected for the junior international team. He was able to play in most positions, but in Zlín he played mainly as a striker.

== Club career ==
In 1951 he moved to Prague where he became an important player for a newly founded army football club (ATK, later called ÚDA and Dukla Prague), for whom he played mainly as a defensive midfielder. In almost 16 years with this club, he was eight-time champion of the league but he achieved his most important successes at the club level in the United States. Dukla Praha with Pluskal in its line-up won the "American Cup" (a tournament of teams from football-developed countries) three times in a row in the first half of the 1960s. In 1962 Pluskal scored the winning goal in the final against Brazilian team FC America.

== International career ==
He played in the Czechoslovak international team from 1952 (starting as a defender) and played in three World Cups. In 1954 he took part in the record 5–0 defeat by Austria in Switzerland. Four years later, at the 1958 world cup finals, Pluskal played in more games. Losing 1–0 to Northern Ireland, drawing 2–2 with West Germany, and scoring a remarkable 6–1 victory over Argentina, under modern rules they would have gone through. Under the rules of the time, having equal points, a play-off had to decide, and Northern Ireland beat them for the second time, this time 2–1 after extra time.

In the 1962 World Cup in Chile, Pluskal was a member of the line-up. With his teammate from Dukla, Josef Masopust, he formed the key midfield of the 4–2–4 formation. Thanks to Pluskal, the team that had had to qualify for the Championships in a playoff with Scotland had got to the World Cup final. There it was beaten by Brazil. In 1965, Pluskal played in the unsuccessful qualification campaign for the World Cup in England, but with this his international career ended. He played 56 matches in Czechoslovak colours and scored one goal.

Thanks to his important contribution to the success in Chile, Pluskal received recognition on the international stage. On 23 October 1963, he was a member of the "Rest of the World" team that took on England at Wembley in front of 100,000 fans, to celebrate 100 years of English football. A year later, he played for the "Europe" team in Belgrade against Yugoslavia, and appeared for Europe again in 1965 against Great Britain.

Pluskal's career was ended by a knee injury in 1967. In the league he played 282 matches and scored 37 goals. He was a universal footballer, a good header of the ball, and he was famous for his slide tackles, with which he cleanly took the ball from his opponents. Although players often protested against this style of play, referees usually considered it to be within the rules. During his football career, this tireless fighter became an impenetrable shield, able to concentrate on what was needed. Off the field, he helped the team with his easy humour.

== Late life ==
As with many other former players, Pluskal became a coach. He did this job for Plzeň clubs Škoda and Slovan, later on for FC Bohemians Praha and for a few years in Enosis Neon Paralimni of Cyprus. He helped Bohemians with their promotion to the First Division.

After a brain stroke Pluskal was confined to bed. He died at the age of 74.
