= Football at the Goodwill Games =

- Organiser(s): Goodwill Games
- Founded: 1994
- Abolished: 1998; 27 years ago
- Region: International

Football has been included at two editions of the Goodwill Games. It was first held as a men's competition in 1994, and later as a women's competition in 1998. The sport was dropped for the 2001 Goodwill Games.

== Men's tournament ==
=== Participating nations ===
Nation	1994	Years
Russia	1	1
World All-Stars	2	1
Total nations	2	

=== Results ===
Year	Host	Final			Number of teams
Year	Host	Winners	Score and venue	Runners-up	Number of teams
1994	Russia	Russia	2–1; Kirov Stadium, Saint Petersburg	World All-Stars	2

== Women's tournament ==
=== Participating nations ===
UEFA
Nation	1998	Years
Denmark	4	1
Norway	3	1
CONCACAF
Nation	1998	Years
United States	1	1
AFC
Nation	1998	Years
China	2	1
Total nations	4	

=== Results ===
Year	Host	Final			Third place play-off			Number of teams
Year	Host	Winners	Score and venue	Runners-up	Third place	Score and venue	Fourth place	Number of teams
1998	United States	United States	2–0; Mitchel Athletic Complex, Uniondale	China	Norway	1–1 (4–2 p); Mitchel Athletic Complex, Uniondale	Denmark	4

== Medal table ==
Rank	Nation	Gold	Silver	Bronze	Total
1	Russia	1	0	0	1
1	United States	1	0	0	1
3	China	0	1	0	1
3	World All-Stars	0	1	0	1
5	Norway	0	0	1	1
Totals (5 entries)		2	2	1	5
