= Europe XI =

Association football teams representing Europe

First international
- England 3–0 Rest of Europe XI (Note: Rest of Europe is sometimes recorded as FIFA) (London, England; 26 October 1938)

Biggest win
- Yugoslavia 2–7 Europe XI (Belgrade, Yugoslavia; 23 September 1964)

Biggest defeat
- Great Britain 6–1 Rest of Europe (Glasgow, Scotland; 10 May 1947)

The Europe XI is an association football scratch team mainly consisting of players from the UEFA region but, on occasion, players hailing from other continents playing for European teams are invited to play. The European XI play one-off games against clubs, national teams, collectives of other confederations, or a World XI made up of players from all the other continents. Because of this, no governing body in the sport officially recognises the team and each incarnation of the team is not seen as a continuation of any other. The causes for these games are anniversaries, testimonials or for charity. Proceeds earned from the games are donated to good causes and the players, coaching staff, and stadium owners are not paid for the event. In recent years, these games have been broadcast live on television.

== Matches ==
Date	Opponent	Stadium	Result	Goals for Europe XI	Reason
26 October 1938	England	Arsenal Stadium, London	0–3		75th anniversary of the FA
10 May 1947	Great Britain	Hampden Park, Glasgow	1–6	Gunnar Nordahl	Home Nations return to FIFA
21 October 1953	England	Wembley, London	4–4	Laszlo Kubala (2×), Giampiero Boniperti (2×)	90th anniversary of the FA
13 August 1955	Great Britain	Windsor Park, Belfast	4–1	Jean Vincent, Bernard Vukas (3×)	75th anniversary of the Irish Football Association
20 May 1964	Scandinavia	Idrætsparken, Copenhagen	4–2	Jimmy Greaves (2×), Denis Law, Eusébio	75th anniversary of the DBU
23 September 1964	Yugoslavia	Marakana, Belgrade	7–2	Uwe Seeler (2×), Eusébio (4×), Jose Augusto	Skopje earthquake appeal fund
28 April 1965	Great Britain	Victoria Ground, Stoke	6–4	Godfried van den Boer, Ferenc Puskás (2×), Josef Masopust, Laszlo Kubala, Jackie Henderson	Stanley Matthews testimonial
27 September 1967	Spain	Santiago Bernabéu, Madrid	3–0	Sandro Mazzola, Eusébio, Fernand Goyvaerts	Ricardo Zamora testimonial
8 December 1970	(Portugal) Benfica	Estádio da Luz, Lisbon	2–3	Uwe Seeler, José Eulogio Gárate	Mário Coluna testimonial
23 November 1971	(England) West Ham United	Upton Park, London	4–4	Frank McDougall, Rodney Marsh (2×), Jimmy Greaves	Geoff Hurst testimonial
1 May 1972	(Germany) Hamburger SV	Volksparkstadion, Hamburg	7–3	Geoff Hurst, Ferenc Bene, Franz Beckenbauer, Gerd Müller, Kálmán Mészöly, George Best, Eusébio	Uwe Seeler testimonial
3 October 1972	South America	St. Jakob-Park, Basel	0–2		Pestalozzi charity match
31 October 1973	South America	Camp Nou, Barcelona	4–4	Eusébio, Salif Keïta, Juan Manuel Asensi, Kurt Jara	FIFA charity match
28 December 1979	(Germany) Borussia Dortmund	Westfalenstadion, Dortmund	2–3	Safet Sušić, Vladimir Petrović	Match for UNICEF
25 February 1981	Italy	Stadio Olimpico, Rome	3–0	Allan Simonsen, Vahid Halilhodžić, Tony Woodcock	Flood disaster appeal
2 June 1981	(Turkey) Fenerbahçe	Şükrü Saracoğlu, Istanbul	0–3		75th anniversary of Fenerbahçe
18 August 1981	Czechoslovakia	Letná-Stadion, Prague	0–4		80th anniversary of the Czechoslovak Football Association
7 August 1982	World XI	Giants Stadium, New York City	3–2	Kevin Keegan, Bruno Pezzey, Giancarlo Antognoni	FIFA charity match for UNICEF
7 November 1995	Americas	Camp Nou, Barcelona	3–4	Hristo Stoichkov, Arteaga, Igor Korneev	UNICEF charity match.
4 December 1997	World XI	Stade Vélodrome, Marseille	2–5	Marius Lacatus, Zinedine Zidane	Match played before 1998 FIFA World Cup draw
18 August 1998	(England) Manchester United	Old Trafford, Manchester	4–8	Jean-Pierre Papin, Laurent Blanc, Martin Dahlin, Mark Wilson	40th anniversary of the Munich air disaster and Eric Cantona testimonial
16 February 2005	World XI (Ronaldinho XI)	Camp Nou, Barcelona	3–6	Alessandro Del Piero, Gianfranco Zola	Football for Hope (Indian Ocean Tsunami funds)
14 March 2007	(England) Manchester United	Old Trafford, Manchester	3–4	Florent Malouda, El Hadji Diouf (2×)	UEFA Celebration Match

=== U18 selection ===
Date	Opponent	Stadium	Result	Goals for Europe XI	Reason
27 February 2007	(African Union) U18 Africa XI	Mini Estadi, Barcelona	1–6	Aarón Ñíguez (2×), Manuel Fischer (2×), Bojan Krkić, Aleksandr Prudnikov	2007 UEFA–CAF Meridian Cup
1 March 2007	(African Union) U18 Africa XI	Mini Estadi, Barcelona	0–4	Krisztián Németh, Manuel Fischer, Aleksandr Prudnikov, Ádám Dudás	2007 UEFA–CAF Meridian Cup

== Players ==
=== Rosters ===
Date	Opponent	Goalkeepers	Defenders	Midfielders	Forwards	Coach	Ref.
7 November 1995	Americas XI	(Spain) Andoni Cedrún and (Romania) Florin Prunea	(Netherlands) Ronald Koeman (c)) (Bulgaria) Iliyan Kiryakov (Spain) Abelardo (Romania) Tibor Selymes and (Romania) Dan Petrescu (Portugal) Fernando Couto (Netherlands) Ruud Heus	(Spain) Michel (Spain) Guillermo Amor (Greece) Michalis Kasapis (Russia) Igor Korneev and (Germany) Bernd Schuster (Spain) Pep Guardiola (Croatia) Robert Prosinecki (Romania) Ilie Dumitrescu (Spain) Arteaga	(Bulgaria) Hristo Stoichkov (France) Philippe Vercruysse	Johan Cruyff and Arsenio Iglesias	
21 January 1997	Africa XI	(Netherlands) Edwin van der Sar (Russia) Stanislav Cherchesov	(Germany) Matthias Sammer (c) (Netherlands) Frank de Boer (Germany) Jürgen Kohler and (Switzerland) Stéphane Henchoz	(France) Vincent Guérin (Portugal) Paulinho Santos (Croatia) Zvonimir Boban (Portugal) Rui Costa (Netherlands) Ronald de Boer and (Germany) Andreas Möller (Czech Republic) Pavel Nedvěd	(Portugal) João Pinto (Germany) Jürgen Klinsmann and (Portugal) Domingos Paciência (Italy) Pierluigi Casiraghi	(Germany) Berti Vogts and (Netherlands) Rinus Michels	
27 April 1997	Rest of World XI	(Netherlands) Stanley Menzo	(Netherlands) Ronald Koeman (Germany) Thomas Berthold (France) Laurent Blanc	(Belgium) Georges Grün (France) Christian Karembeu and (Netherlands) Jordi Cruyff (Spain) Eusebio	(France) Eric Cantona (c) (Italy) Gianluca Vialli (Sweden) Tomas Brolin (Bulgaria) Hristo Stoichkov (Italy) Roberto Mancini and (Bosnia and Herzegovina) Elvir Bolic	(France) Guy Roux	
4 December 1997	FIFA Rest of World XI	(Germany) Andreas Kopke and (Norway) Frode Grodås	(Austria) Heimo Pfeifenberger (Germany) Thomas Berthold (Italy) Billy Costacurta (Spain) Fernando Hierro and (Socialist Federal Republic of Yugoslavia) Slavisa Jokanovic (Denmark) Søren Colding	(England) Paul Ince (Bulgaria) Krasimir Balakov (France) Zinedine Zidane (c) (Belgium) Dominique Lemoine	(Romania) Marius Lacatus (Netherlands) Patrick Kluivert (Croatia) Alen Boksic and (Scotland) Gordon Durie	(Germany) Franz Beckenbauer	
18 August 1998	Manchester United	(France) Pascal Olmeta	(Italy) Gianluca Festa (France) William Prunier (France) Laurent Blanc and (France) Christophe Galtier (Spain) Albert Ferrer (France) Joel Cantona	(England) Paul Gascoigne (France) Vahirua (Wales) Mark Hughes (England) Bryan Robson and (England) Lee Sharpe (England) Clive Wilson	(France) Eric Cantona (c) (France) Jean-Pierre Papin (Sweden) Martin Dahlin and (France) Stéphane Paille		

=== Players with most selections ===
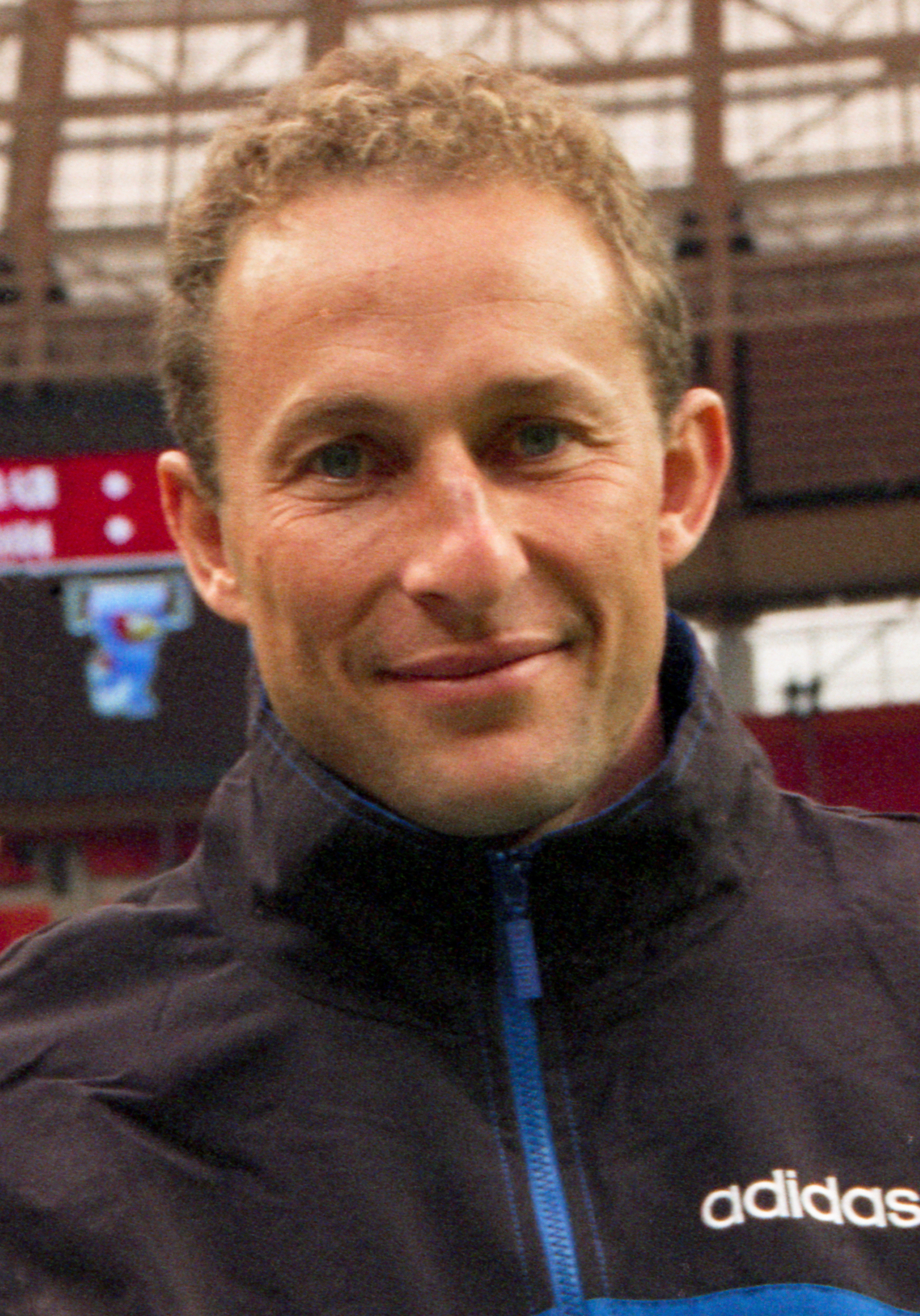
Jean-Pierre Papin was selected in 1998.

Testimonial and legends' matches are not included.

Player	Selections	Europe XI Matches	Matches for the opposition	Notes
(France) Eric Cantona	2	1997, 1998		April 1997
(France) Laurent Blanc	2	1997, 1998		April 1997
(Netherlands) Ronald Koeman	2	1995, 1997		April 1997
(Bulgaria) Hristo Stoichkov	2	1995, 1997		April 1997

=== List of captains ===
The list includes all matches.

Period	Team Captain	Notes
1995	(Netherlands) Ronald Koeman	
1997	(Germany) Matthias Sammer	
1997	(France) Eric Cantona	
1997	(France) Zinedine Zidane	
1998	(France) Eric Cantona (ret.)	Manchester United match
2007	(Sweden) Henrik Larsson	UEFA Celebration Match

== Coaches ==
=== List of coaches ===
Period	Coach	Notes
1972	(Argentina) Helenio Herrera and (Austria) Karl Rappan	
1995	(Netherlands) Johan Cruyff and (Spain) Arsenio Iglesias	November
1997	(Germany) Berti Vogts and (Netherlands) Rinus Michels	January
1997	(France) Guy Roux	April
1997	(Germany) Franz Beckenbauer	December
2007	(Italy) Marcello Lippi	

=== Other notable coaches ===
- (Hungary) László Kubala
- (Netherlands) Frank Rijkaard
- (France) Arsène Wenger
- (Belgium) José Crahay
- (Netherlands) Karel Lotsy
- (Italy) Vittorio Pozzo
- (Italy) Nereo Rocco

== See also ==
- Team Europe
- World XI
- Americas XI
- Africa XI
