= Rest of the world in sports and games =

Group of players from many countries

Within sports and games played at the international competitive level, the Rest of the World refers to a team of players from many countries of origin that compete against a single individual or a team from a single group, such as a club or country.

== Overview ==
As a Rest of the World team usually has little experience in playing together or working as a team, their ability is not usually considered indicative of their actual abilities, either individually or as members of their usual teams, and as such, games played against the rest of the world are not normally considered to show the true talent of either the rest of the world or the team competing against them. As a consequence, Rest of the World matches are usually played as one-off events either as friendly games or for a non-competitive special purpose, such as international aid or commemoration.

However, some such events can produce spectacular and intense games, such as the chess game between Garry Kasparov and the Rest of the World in 1999. The chess matches of Russia and the Soviet Union against the rest of the World were also tightly contested.

== Examples ==
In rugby league, the Other Nationalities team played from 1904 to 1975. In rugby union, the British and Irish Lions faced the Rest of the World XV in 1986.

In basketball, the NBA Rising Stars Challenge faces a Team USA versus a Team World since 2015. The NBA All-Star Game also adopted such a format in 2026.

=== Cricket ===
Noted examples of Rest of the World teams in cricket included those organised to tour England in 1970 and Australia in 1971–72 in place of planned tours from South Africa abandoned because of political opposition due to the apartheid policy. Although the matches in 1970 were declared at the time to have official Test cricket status, this was subsequently withdrawn. A World XI also played against Australia in the 2005 ICC Super Series. The first class match in that series retains Test match status, a move which was and is controversial with some cricket statisticians such as Bill Frindall. However the status is unlikely to be withdrawn in part because of the effect on noted cricket records; for instance without the wickets taken in this match, Muttiah Muralitharan would fall slightly short of 800 career test wickets. A world XI also competed in unofficial World Series Cricket in 1977-9, and a "Rest of the World XI" contested two short tournaments in England dubbed the "World Cricket Cup" in 1966 and 1967, struggling in the first, but emerging victorious in the second.

=== Association football ===
The first example of a Rest of the World team in football (soccer) is almost as old as the association game. In 1867 a side made up of players from Eton School and Harrow School played against a side described as "the World", a fixture which was repeated over the next couple of years. Another Rest of the World side played the Wanderers to close the 1870–71 season. Given the association football world at this time barely extended beyond London, the name was not used as a serious epithet, and the media were in on the joke, Charles W. Alcock being nicknamed "the Cochin" for his captaincy of the World side in 1867.

The first properly organized "Rest of the World" match occurred on 23rd October 1963, when a Rest of the World side played against England at Wembley Stadium in an occasion to mark a centenary celebration of the sport. The game was marked by strong performances by Jimmy Greaves, Lev Yashin, Denis Law (who played for the Rest of the World), and Luis Eyzaguirre (which earned him the nickname "Fifo," after FIFA). A similar event occurred on 8 August 1987 when such a side contested a match, also at Wembley, against a Football League XI to commemorate the centenary of the English Football League. This comprised the last high-profile occasion on which Diego Maradona played on English soil. Although the game was sparsely attended, the hostile reception of Maradona, just over a year after the "Hand of God" incident, was notable. Gary Lineker, who at the time was playing for FC Barcelona, played alongside Maradona for the Rest of the World.

=== Golf ===
Two events in golf, one currently active and the other defunct, involve teams officially labeled "International" that are effectively "rest of the world" teams. The Presidents Cup in men's golf, held in odd-numbered years, features competition between a United States team and an "International" team made up of non-European players (Europeans compete against the US in even-numbered years in the Ryder Cup). The now-defunct Lexus Cup in women's golf was an annual competition that matched an Asia team against an "International" team drawn from all other nationalities.

=== Chess ===
Three chess games have been played, in 1970, 1984 and 2002, in which the Soviet Union/Russia national chess team faced a Rest of the World team.

== Non-sporting usage ==
Outside sports and games, Rest of World (RoW) is also a term used to distinguish an unspecified but inclusive group of nations from one or more dominant players in the comparative analysis of markets, economies, military capabilities, and so forth, especially in graphs or charts to show the numbers representing the other countries.

The Federation of American Scientists, for instance, provides a list of RoW weapons systems, meaning systems belonging to nations other than the United States.

=== Eurovision Song Contest ===
The flag used to represent the "Rest of the World" on the voting website of the Eurovision Song Contest.

On 22 November 2022, the European Broadcasting Union announced that, starting from 2023, the Eurovision Song Contest would include a televote from non-participating countries for the first time. Viewers from those countries would be able to vote in all shows, with their votes being aggregated and presented as one individual set of points under "Rest of the World" or "RoW".

== See also ==
- Team World
- World XI (association football)
- World XI (cricket)
- International XI women's cricket team
- List of international rugby union teams
- Other Nationalities rugby league team
- Category:Multi-national teams in international cricket
