= Mailson Lima =

Dutch-born Cape Verdean footballer (born 1994)

Personal information
- Full name: Mailson Lima Duarte Lopes
- Date of birth: 29 May 1994 (age 32)
- Place of birth: The Hague, Netherlands
- Height: 1.78 m (5 ft 10 in)
- Position: Winger

Team information
- Current team: Hibernians
- Number: 70

Youth career
- –2011: Haaglandia
- 2011–2013: ADO Den Haag
- 2013–2015: Dordrecht

Senior career*
Years	Team	Apps	(Gls)
2016–2017	Fortuna Sittard	4	(0)
2017–2018	Dordrecht	16	(5)
2018	Viitorul Constanța	16	(0)
2019–2021	Ararat-Armenia	51	(13)
2021	Dibba Al-Hisn		
2021–2023	Ararat-Armenia	51	(20)
2023	Aksu	8	(2)
2024	Persib Bandung	13	(0)
2025–	Hibernians	24	(2)

International career
2018	Cape Verde	1	(0)
- * Club domestic league appearances and goals as of 18 May 2026

Mailson Lima Duarte Lopes (born 29 May 1994) is a professional footballer who plays as a winger for Maltese Premier League club Hibernians. Born in the Netherlands, he has made one appearance for the Cape Verde national team.

== Club career ==
Mailson made his Eerste Divisie debut for Fortuna Sittard on 28 April 2017 in a game against RKC Waalwijk.

In January 2018, after a brief spell with Dordrecht where he played 16 league matches and scored five goals, Mailson signed a one-and-a-half-year contract with the option of another two years with Romanian team Viitorul Constanța.

On 26 February 2019, Lima signed with FC Ararat-Armenia. After leaving Ararat-Armenia for Dibba Al-Hisn in January 2021, Lima returned to Ararat-Armenia on 6 July 2021.

On 23 June 2023, Ararat-Armenia confirmed Lima's departure from the club.

On 12 August 2023, Lima signed for Kazakhstan Premier League club Aksu.

On 27 July 2024, Lima signed for Indonesian team Persib Bandung on a one-year contract.

== International career ==
Lima made his professional debut for the Cape Verde national football team in a friendly 3–2 win over Algeria on 1 June 2018.

== Personal life ==
He is the older brother of Ronaldo Lima Duarte Lopes.

== Career statistics ==
=== Club ===
As of match played 22 December 2024

Appearances and goals by club, season and competition
Club	Season	League			National cup (Note: Includes KNVB Cup, Cupa României, Armenian Cup)		League cup		Continental		Other		Total	
Club	Season	Division	Apps	Goals	Apps	Goals	Apps	Goals	Apps	Goals	Apps	Goals	Apps	Goals
Fortuna Sittard	2016–17	Eredivisie	1	0	0	0	—		—		—		1	0
Dordrecht	2017–18	Eredivisie	16	5	1	0	—		—		—		17	5
Viitorul Constanța	2017–18	Liga I	8	0	2	0	—		0	0	—		10	0
Viitorul Constanța	2018–19	Liga I	8	0	1	0	—		4 (Note: Appearances in UEFA Europa League)	0	—		13	0
Viitorul Constanța	Total		16	0	3	0	0	0	4	0	0	0	23	0
Ararat-Armenia	2018–19	Armenian Premier League	15	1	2	0	—		—		—		17	1
Ararat-Armenia	2019–20	Armenian Premier League	26	8	4	0	—		6 (Note: One appearance in UEFA Champions League, five appearances and two goals in UEFA Europa League)	2	1 (Note: Appearance in Armenian Supercup)	1	37	11
Ararat-Armenia	2020–21	Armenian Premier League	10	4	0	0	—		4 (Note: One appearance in UEFA Champions League, three appearances and three goals in UEFA Europa League)	3	1	1	15	8
Ararat-Armenia	Total		51	13	6	0	0	0	10	5	2	2	69	20
Dibba Al-Hisn	2020–21	UAE First Division League					—		—		—			
Ararat-Armenia	2021–22	Armenian Premier League	32	18	1	1	—		—		—		33	19
Ararat-Armenia	2022–23	Armenian Premier League	19	2	2	0	—		2 (Note: Appearances in UEFA Europa Conference League)	0	—		23	2
Ararat-Armenia	Total		51	20	3	1	0	0	2	0	0	0	56	21
Aksu	2023	Kazakhstan Premier League	8	2	0	0	—		—		—		8	2
Persib Bandung	2024–25	Liga 1	13	0	0	0	—		6 (Note: Appearances in AFC Champions League Two)	0	—		19	0
Career total			150	39	13	1	0	0	20	5	2	2	185	47

=== International ===
As of match played 1 June 2019

Appearances and goals by national team and year
National team	Year	Apps	Goals
Cape Verde	2018	1	0
Total		1	0

== Honours ==
Viitorul Constanța

- Cupa României: 2018–19

Ararat-Armenia

- Armenian Premier League: 2018–19, 2019–20
- Armenian Supercup: 2019

Individual

- Armenian Premier League Player of the Season: 2019–20
- Armenian Premier League Player of the Month: September 2021
