= Football at the 1994 Goodwill Games =

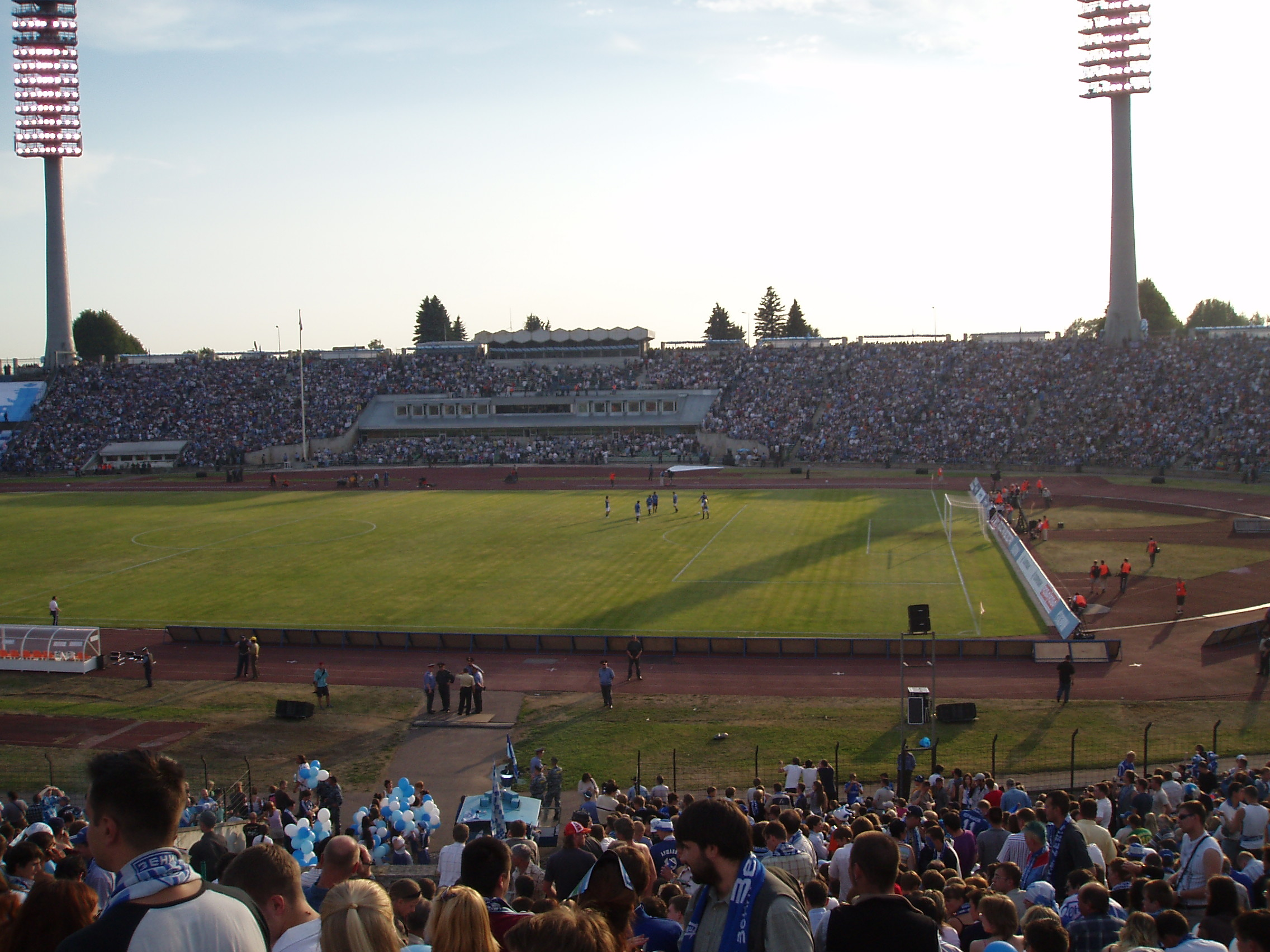
- Kirov Stadium in Saint Petersburg hosted the match.
- Event: 1994 Goodwill Games
Russia	World All-Stars
2	1
- Date: 7 August 1994
- Venue: Kirov Stadium, Saint Petersburg
- Man of the Match: Omari Tetradze (Russia)
- Referee: Vadim Zhuk (Belarus)
- Attendance: 78,000

The men's football competition at the 1994 Goodwill Games consisted of a single all-star match on 7 August 1994. It was played between Russia and a World XI at Kirov Stadium in Saint Petersburg, Russia. This was the first instance of football being played at the Goodwill Games.

Russia defeated the World All-Stars 2–1 to win the football competition.

== Background ==
The competition was the first time football was played at the Goodwill Games. The fixture was an all-star game between the Russia national team and a "World XI" selection. The match was Russia's first since the 1994 FIFA World Cup months earlier, where the team finished third in their group and were eliminated. The Russian team, under new manager Oleg Romantsev, included six players from their World Cup squad: Dmitri Khlestov, Yuriy Nikiforov, Andrey Pyatnitsky, Vladislav Ternavsky, Omari Tetradze and Ilya Tsymbalar. Prior to the match, there was speculation that stars from the 1994 World Cup would be included in the World XI, including Golden Ball winner Romário of Brazil. However, this did not come to fruition due to many players being bound by their club contracts, and thus only two players from the prior World Cup were selected for the World All-Stars: Bulgarian Boncho Genchev and American Roy Wegerle. Due to a shortage in players for the All-Stars, two Russian forwards – both also at the 1994 World Cup – also joined the team: Dmitri Radchenko and Oleg Salenko. Franz Beckenbauer was planned as the manager for the All-Stars, but was unable to attend due to contractual stipulations requiring his presence in Japan. Fellow German Udo Lattek instead coached the World XI. The exhibition match, which was unofficial for Russia, was played on 7 August 1994 as part of the closing ceremony of the 1994 Goodwill Games. Unlimited substitutions were allowed, and players who were substituted out were allowed to re-enter the match.

== Match ==
=== Details ===
7 August 1994

Russia	2–1	World All-Stars
Tetradze 22'; Radimov 87'	Report	Genchev 49'

Kirov Stadium, Saint Petersburg
Attendance: 78,000
Referee: Vadim Zhuk (Belarus)

Russia	World All-Stars

GK	1	Zaur Khapov
DF	2	Dmitri Khlestov
DF	3	Ramiz Mamedov	(substituted off) 55'
DF	4	Yuriy Nikiforov
MF	5	Rashid Rakhimov	(substituted off) 78'
MF	6	Ilya Tsymbalar
MF	7	Valery Yesipov	(substituted off) 63'
MF	9	Andrey Pyatnitsky (c)
MF	10	Omari Tetradze
FW	8	Vladimir Niederhaus	(substituted off) 46'
FW	11	Igor Simutenkov
Substitutes:
GK	12	Yevgeni Plotnikov
DF	15	Vladislav Ternavsky	(substituted on) 55'
MF	14	Aleksei Kosolapov	(substituted on) 78'
MF	16	Vladislav Radimov	(substituted on) 63'
MF	18	Robert Yevdokimov	(substituted on) 46'
Manager:
Oleg Romantsev

GK	1	(Germany) Toni Schumacher		(substituted off) 46'
DF	2	(Israel) Nir Klinger					(substituted off) 73'
DF	3	(United States) Roy Wegerle
DF	4	(Federal Republic of Yugoslavia) Miodrag Božović
MF	5	(Poland) Zbigniew Boniek (c)	(yellow card) 83'
MF	7	(Poland) Jarosław Araszkiewicz (Note: Contemporary Russian sources identify this player as Jarosław Araszkiewicz of Poland. However, the Goodwill Games website attributes the appearance to a "Pavel Michawicz" of Poland.)
MF	10	(Hungary) Lajos Détári
MF	18	(Bulgaria) Boncho Genchev		(substituted off) 32'	(substituted on) 46'
FW	6	(Russia) Dmitri Radchenko			(substituted off) 46'	(substituted on) 60'
FW	8	(Norway) Jørn Andersen
FW	19	(Russia) Oleg Salenko				(substituted off) 60'	(substituted on) 73'
Substitutes:
GK	12	(Romania) Silviu Lung		(substituted on) 46'
MF	13	(Turkey) Oğuz Çetin		(substituted on) 32'
Manager:
(Germany) Udo Lattek

Man of the Match:
Omari Tetradze (Russia)

Assistant referees:
Oleg Chikun (Belarus)
Yuri Dupanov (Belarus)

Match rules

- 90 minutes.
- Penalty shoot-out if scores level.
- Unlimited substitutions, with re-entry allowed.

== Statistics ==
=== Goalscorers ===
There were 3 goals scored in 1 match, for an average of 3 goals per match.

1 goal

- (Russia) Vladislav Radimov
- (Russia) Omari Tetradze
- Boncho Genchev

=== Tournament ranking ===
Pos	Team	Pld	W	D	L	GF	GA	GD	Pts	Final result
1	Russia (H)	1	1	0	0	2	1	+1	3	Gold medal
2	World All-Stars	1	0	0	1	1	2	−1	0	Silver medal

Source: Goodwill Games
(H) Hosts

== Medal summary ==
=== Medal table ===
* Host nation (Russia)

Rank	Nation	Gold	Silver	Bronze	Total
1	Russia*	1	0	0	1
2	World All-Stars	0	1	0	1
Totals (2 entries)		1	1	0	2

=== Medalists ===
Event	Gold	Silver
Football	Russia; Zaur Khapov; Dmitri Khlestov; Aleksei Kosolapov; Ramiz Mamedov; Vladimir Niederhaus; Yuriy Nikiforov; Yevgeni Plotnikov; Andrey Pyatnitsky; Vladislav Radimov; Rashid Rakhimov; Igor Simutenkov; Vladislav Ternavsky; Omari Tetradze; Ilya Tsymbalar; Valery Yesipov; Robert Yevdokimov	World All-Stars; Jørn Andersen; Jarosław Araszkiewicz; Zbigniew Boniek; Miodrag Božović; Oğuz Çetin; Lajos Détári; Boncho Genchev; Nir Klinger; Silviu Lung; Dmitri Radchenko; Oleg Salenko; Toni Schumacher; Roy Wegerle
