= 1963 England v Rest of the World football match =

FA centenary exhibition

1963 England v Rest of the World
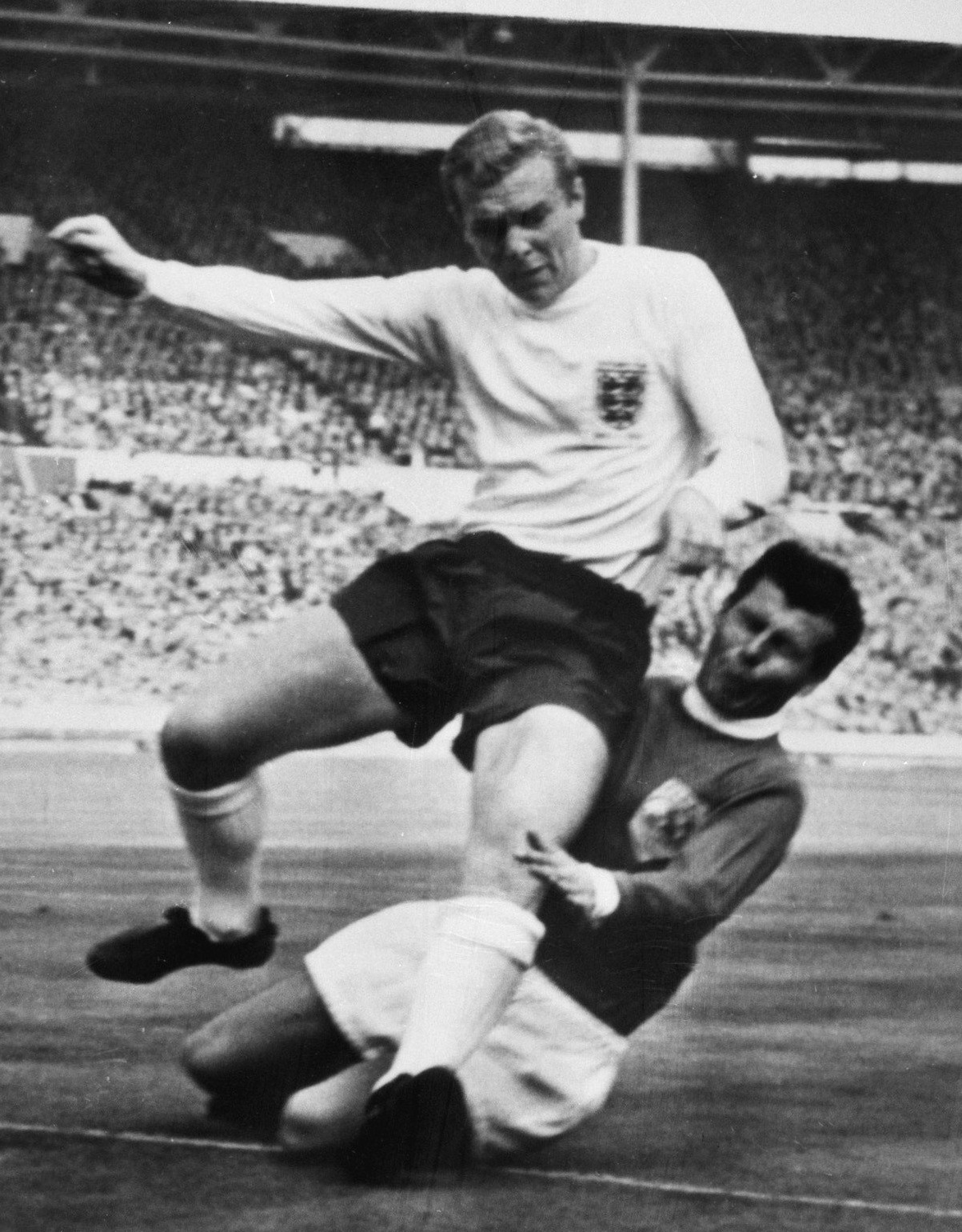
- Bobby Moore (left) vs. Josef Masopust at the match
- Event: 100th. anniversary of The Football Association
England	Rest of the World
2	1
- Date: 23 October 1963
- Venue: Wembley Stadium, London
- Referee: Bob Davidson (Scotland)
- Attendance: 87,000

England v Rest of the World was a 1963 football match held at the Wembley Stadium in London. The Football Association invited FIFA to select a team to play England as part of the FA's celebration of the 100th anniversary of association football and was the first time a world team played against a single nation.

== Venue ==
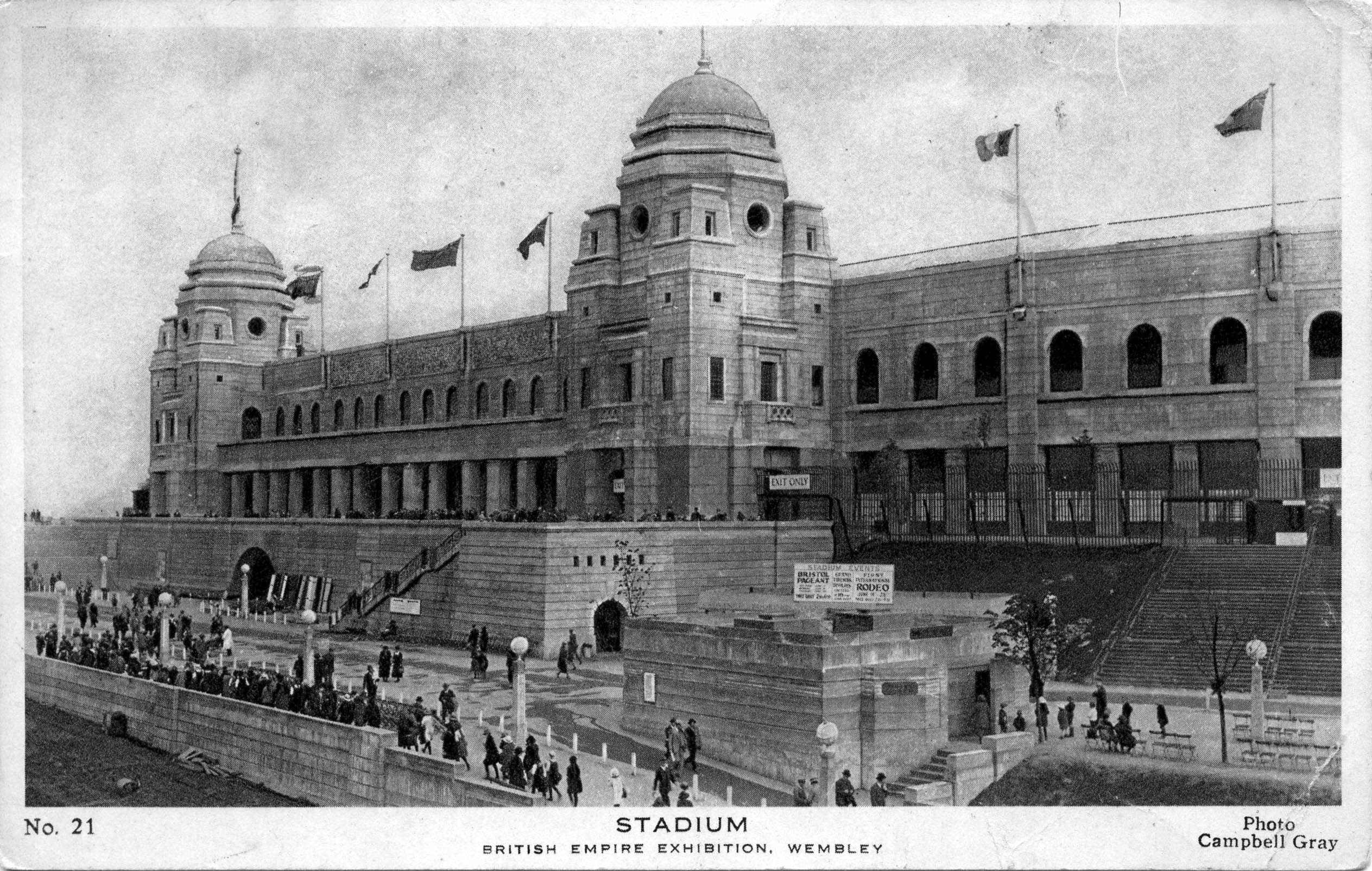
Wembley Stadium, venue

The match was held in Wembley Stadium, originally known as the "Empire Stadium", opened in 1923

Wembley hosted the FA Cup final annually, the first in 1923, which was the stadium's inaugural event, the League Cup final annually, five European Cup finals, the 1966 World Cup final, and the Euro 1996 final. Brazilian footballer Pelé once said of the stadium: "Wembley is the cathedral of football. It is the capital of football and it is the heart of football", in recognition of its status as the world's most famous football stadium.

The stadium also hosted many other sports events, including the 1948 Summer Olympics, rugby league's Challenge Cup final, and the 1992 and 1995 Rugby League World Cup finals. It was also the venue for numerous music events, including the 1985 Live Aid charity concert, as well as SummerSlam 1992, the first major professional wrestling pay-per-view to take place outside of North America.

The stadium was demolished in 2002 to make room for the new Wembley Stadium.

== Overview ==
For the FA's 90th anniversary celebrations, they had also played a Rest of the World team, but this was only selected from players from Europe. Jimmy Greaves was close to scoring for England several times in the first half, but failed due to laudable saves by Lev Yashin. In the second half, when Yashin was replaced by Milutin Šoškić, Greaves assisted Terry Paine to score in the 66th minute. Denis Law equalised 16 minutes later, but Greaves brought England to a last-minute victory. Greaves had the best game of his career and was considered as the best player of the match, while Yashin's saves greatly contributed to his reputation of world's best goalkeeper and earned him the Ballon d'Or two months later.

As promised by FIFA, all of the World XI substitutes were used in the second half, with Raymond Kopa replaced by Uwe Seeler. The World XI selection committee, headed by Harry Cavan, invited Soviet-Georgian Mikheil Meskhi via the USSR Football Federation, who falsely replied he was injured and could not play—he was not informed of the invitation. Santos FC refused to release Pelé. A.C. Milan refused to release Cesare Maldini, who was replaced by Slovan Bratislava's Ján Popluhár.

== Match details ==
23 October 1963
14:45 BST

England	2–1	Rest of the World
Paine 68'; Greaves 87'	(Report)	82' Law

Wembley Stadium, London
Attendance: 87,000
Referee: Bob Davidson (Scotland)

England
Rest of the World

GK	1	Gordon Banks
RB	2	Jimmy Armfield (c)
LB	3	Ray Wilson
RH	4	Gordon Milne
CH	5	Maurice Norman
LH	6	Bobby Moore
OR	7	Terry Paine
IR	8	Jimmy Greaves
CF	9	Bobby Smith
IL	10	George Eastham
OL	11	Bobby Charlton
Substitutes:
GK	12	Tony Waiters
FB	13	Ken Shellito
MF	14	Ron Flowers
LH	15	Tony Kay
CF	16	Joe Baker
Manager:
(England) Alf Ramsey

GK	1	(Soviet Union) Lev Yashin
RB	2	(Brazil) Djalma Santos
LB	3	(West Germany) Karl-Heinz Schnellinger
RH	4	(Czechoslovakia) Svatopluk Pluskal
CH	5	(Czechoslovakia) Ján Popluhár
LH	6	(Czechoslovakia) Josef Masopust
OR	7	(France) Raymond Kopa
IR	8	(Scotland) Denis Law
CF	9	(Argentina) Alfredo di Stéfano (c)
IL	10	(Portugal) Eusébio
OL	11	(Spain) Francisco Gento
Substitutes:
GK	1	(Socialist Federal Republic of Yugoslavia) Milutin Šoškić
DF	2	(Chile) Luis Eyzaguirre
DF	6	(Scotland) Jim Baxter
FW	9	(West Germany) Uwe Seeler
FW	10	(Hungary) Ferenc Puskás
Manager:
(Chile) Fernando Riera
