= Americas XI =

Association football teams representing Americas

First international
- Europe XI 0-2 South America XI (Basel, Switzerland; 3 October 1972)

Biggest win
- World XI 1–5 Americas XI (Tokyo, Japan; 30 August 1995)

The Americas XI is an association football scratch team consisting of players from the CONMEBOL and CONCACAF region. The Americas XI play one-off games against clubs, national teams, collectives of other confederations, or a World XI made up of players from all the other continents. Because of this, no governing body in the sport officially recognises the team and each incarnation of the team is not seen as a continuation of any other. The causes for these games are anniversaries, testimonials or for charity.

Proceeds earned from the games are donated to good causes and the players, coaching staff, and stadium owners are not paid for the event. In recent years, these games have been broadcast live on television.

== History ==
Initially, it started in 1972 as a South American selection while a CONCACAF XI participated in the Brazil Independence Cup (alongside the Africa XI). The two selection from South and Central/North America started represented selections jointly from the 1980s and onwards. It is also called Pan-American XI.

== Results ==
3 October 1972

Europe XI	0-2	South America XI
	Report	Cubillas 35'; Ildo Maneiro 65'

St. Jakob-Park, Basel
Attendance: 14,500
Referee: Landauer (United States)

Pestalozzi charity match

31 October 1973

Europe XI	4-4	South America XI
Eusébio 14'; Salif Keïta 22'; Asensi 51'; Kurt Jara 54'	Report	Hugo Sotil 13'; Cubillas 28'; Brindisi 64'; Chumpitaz 80' pen.

Camp Nou, Barcelona
Attendance: 28,000
Referee: Angonese (Italy)

FIFA charity match

27 July 1986

Americas XI	2–2	FIFA World XI
Cabañas 81'; Maradona 88'	Report	Butcher 15'; Rossi 59'
Penalties
Negrete (penalty missed); Falcão (penalty scored); Alemão (penalty scored); Cabañas (penalty scored); Maradona (penalty scored)	4–3	(penalty scored) Rossi; (penalty scored) Lerby; (penalty missed) Amoros; (penalty scored) Strachan; (penalty missed) Park Chang-sun

Rose Bowl, Pasadena
Attendance: 57,600
Referee: David Socha (United States)

FIFA Charity Match for UNICEF

30 August 1995

Americas XI	5–1	FIFA World XI
Hermosillo 7', 17', 38'; Medina Bello 43'; Dunga 69'	Report	Protasov 4'

Japan National Stadium, Japan
Attendance: 42,888

Kobe Earthquake Benefit Match

7 November 1995

Europe XI	3-4	Americas XI
Stoichkov; Arteaga; Igor Korneev	Report	Latorre; Romário

Camp Nou, Barcelona

UNICEF charity match.

== Players ==
=== List of captains ===
The list includes all matches.

Period	Team Captain	Notes
1995	(Brazil) Zico (Note: Zico was also assistant coach. On 31' he was replaced by Valderrama and Dunga took over as captain.)	1995, Tokyo
1995	(Colombia) Carlos Valderrama	1995, Barcelona

== Coaches ==
Period	Coach	Notes
1972	(Argentina) Omar Sivori	
1986	(Argentina) Carlos Bilardo	
1995	(Socialist Federal Republic of Yugoslavia) Bora Milutinovic	1995, Kobe
1995	(Argentina) César Luis Menotti and (Argentina) Jorge Valdano	1995, Barcelona

== See also ==
- World XI
- Europe XI
