= Bobby Davidson =

Scottish football referee

Robert Holley "Bobby" Davidson
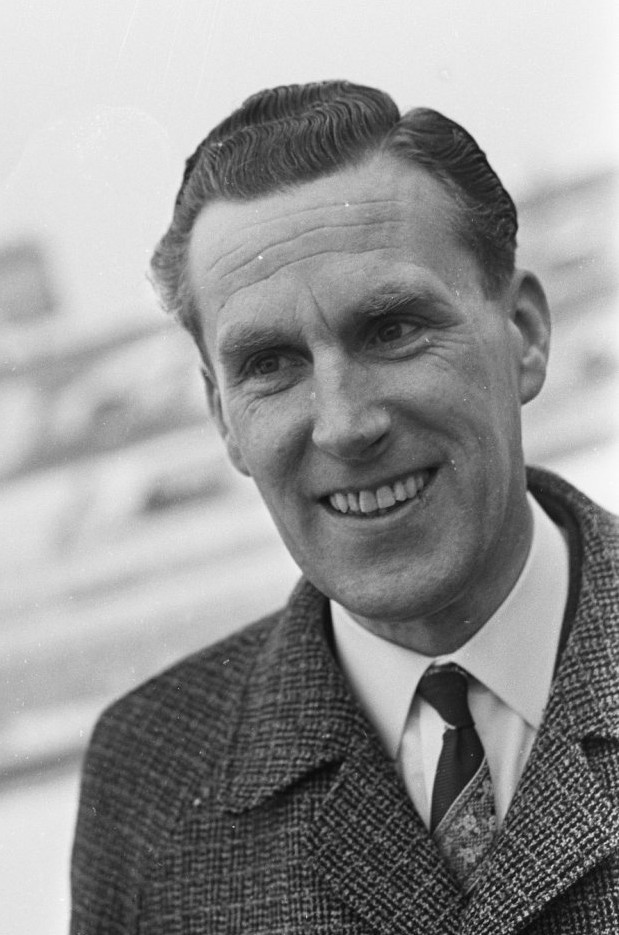
- Davidson in 1969
- Born: 19 July 1928
- Died: 17 December 1992 (aged 64)
- Other occupation: football referee

Robert Holley "Bobby" Davidson (19 July 1928 – 17 December 1992) was a Scottish football referee who also operated for FIFA.

== Career ==
He was Scotland's representative at the 1962, 1970 and 1974 World Cups. He additionally took charge of the match between England and the Rest of the World in October 1963 which celebrated the centenary of The Football Association, and refereed the 1975 UEFA Cup Winners' Cup Final between Dynamo Kiev and Ferencváros.

Davidson refereed four matches over his World Cup career; two games in 1962, and a single game in each of the other competitions. In the 1962 tournament in Chile, he took charge of the Group B match between Italy and West Germany on 31 May 1962, plus West Germany against Chile on 6 June 1962, in the same group. He was also one of the linesmen during the Final between Brazil and Czechoslovakia on 17 June 1962 at the Estadio Nacional, Santiago under referee Nikolay Latyshev.

The match he handled in 1970 was the group stage tie between Uruguay and Israel on 2 June 1970. He was also a linesman for the group match involving the Soviet Union versus Belgium on 6 June 1970, and again for the quarter-final on 14 June 1970, when Uruguay beat the Soviet Union 1–0.

In Germany four years later, he refereed the Netherlands against Argentina in a second phase group game on 29 June 1974. He was linesman for Poland against Argentina in a group game on 15 June 1974, and also for Chile versus East Germany in another group match played on 18 June 1974. In addition, Davidson was a linesman during the second phase group match between the Netherlands and Brazil on 3 July 1974.

Before the 1974 Final there was much speculation in the Scottish press that he would referee the final, some suggesting this as a sort of 'consolation prize' for Scotland being eliminated from that year's tournament without losing a game. The final was actually refereed by England's Jack Taylor.

Bobby Davidson later became a director and honorary chairman of Airdrieonians and served on the Scottish league management committee. He died on 23 December 1993, at the age of 65.

Preceded by UEFA Cup Winners' Cup Final 1974 (Netherlands) Arie van Gemert	UEFA Cup Winners' Cup Final Referees; Final 1975 (Scotland) Bobby Davidson	Succeeded by UEFA Cup Winners' Cup Final 1976 (France) Robert Wurtz
