= Vahirua =

Vahirua is a surname. Notable people with the surname include:

- Marama Vahirua (born 1980), Tahitian footballer
- Pascal Vahirua (born 1966), French footballer
