= United Kingdom national football team =

United Kingdom
- Head coach: None
- Captain: None
- Most caps: Billy Liddell; Stanley Matthews (2)
- Top scorer: Wilf Mannion; Tommy Lawton; Bryan Douglas (2)
- Home stadium: Various
- FIFA code: UK; GBR

FIFA ranking
- Current: N/A

First international
- United Kingdom 6–1 Rest of Europe (Glasgow, United Kingdom; 10 May 1947)

Biggest win
- United Kingdom 6–1 Rest of Europe (Glasgow, United Kingdom; 10 May 1947)

Biggest defeat
- United Kingdom 1–4 Rest of Europe (Belfast, United Kingdom; 13 August 1955)

The United Kingdom national football team is the national football team that represents the United Kingdom. Unlike most other countries where a single national team represents the entire sovereign state, separate teams represent each home nation (England, Scotland, Wales, and Northern Ireland) in all major international football tournaments such as the FIFA World Cup and UEFA European Championship, the UEFA Nations League, as well as friendlies. The United Kingdom as a whole is not a member of FIFA or UEFA, but the individual home countries (England, Scotland, Wales and Northern Ireland) are.

The United Kingdom national team has only played in friendlies and other ceremonial games, with the last one being played in 1965 against the rest of Europe.

The one place where the United Kingdom has competed in a major football tournament as a whole is at the Summer Olympic Games, where it is represented by the Great Britain Olympic football team, which despite the name can also include Northern Ireland players, who can choose to represent either the British or Irish teams. A United Kingdom football team also participates regularly at the Summer Universiade football tournament.

== Background ==
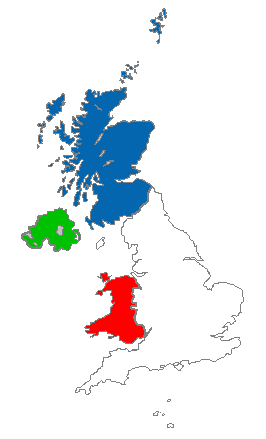
The four football associations of the United Kingdom: England Scotland Wales Northern Ireland

When the world's first football association, The Football Association (FA), was formed in 1863, its geographical remit was not clear: there was no specification of whether it covered just England, all of the United Kingdom, the British Empire or even the entire world. The question was answered when the Scottish Football Association (SFA) was founded in 1873.

The third national football association, the Football Association of Wales (FAW) was founded in 1876 and a fourth, the Irish Football Association (IFA), was founded in 1880. Football therefore developed with separate associations and national teams for each of the countries of the United Kingdom or "Home Nations".

Representative international matches between England and Scotland were played as far back as 1872, and the Home Nations formed the International Football Association Board (IFAB) in 1886 to co-ordinate matches between their teams. FIFA was formed by non-British associations in 1904, and by 1913 the Home Nations were in FIFA and FIFA was on the IFAB. In 1921, around the time of the partition of Ireland, the Football Association of Ireland (FAI) split from the IFA and disputed its authority.

In 1923, an agreement between the IFAB and FIFA meant the FAI would represent the Irish Free State and the IFA Northern Ireland; also, FIFA agreed that relationships between the Home Nations would be outside its remit. England and Scotland separately played internationals against various European teams, but the Home Nations withdrew from FIFA in 1928, in a dispute over amateurism, and did not rejoin until 1946, missing the first three World Cups.

England have been the only Home Nation to have any major success internationally, winning the 1966 World Cup. Scotland have qualified for the final tournaments of nine World Cups and three European Championships, but have never progressed beyond the group stage of any international tournament. Wales reached the semi-finals of the European Championships in 2016, and Wales have qualified for World Cup finals twice – in 1958 and 2022 while Northern Ireland have not qualified for a World Cup Finals since 1986.

This is sometimes raised as an argument in favour of a single United Kingdom national team: based on statistical analysis. In June 2006, it was estimated that a United Kingdom national team would have had a one-third greater chance of winning the 2006 World Cup, than England did at the tournament's outset. Opponents of the plan argue that the existing footballing identities of the fans of the Home Nations should not be sacrificed simply to stand a better chance of success.

There has been limited support for the creation of a permanent British national team. Although often hypothetical in nature, such a proposal has been put forward by prominent government ministers, including Jack Straw and Tony Banks. In July 2014, after England performed poorly in the 2014 World Cup, Conservative MP Laurence Robertson submitted an early day motion, calling for a United Kingdom Football Team.

== Matches ==
Great Britain (1947)	Great Britain (1955)
The kits worn in the two past matches: • Scotland's blue in 1947. • Northern Ireland's green in 1955.

Despite this, the Home Nations have previously united to play two friendly internationals against 'Rest of Europe' representative sides. On both occasions, they included all four Home Nations: England, Scotland, Wales and Northern Ireland (despite Northern Ireland's participation, both matches were played under the name of 'Great Britain').

- 10 May 1947; Hampden Park, Glasgow: Great Britain 6–1 Rest of Europe
- 13 August 1955; Windsor Park, Belfast: Great Britain 1–4 Rest of Europe

=== 1947: the Match of the Century ===
The 1947 game, dubbed the 'Match of the Century', was played to celebrate the return of the Home Nations to FIFA, which they had left in 1920. For the match, played at Scotland's Hampden Park in front of 135,000 spectators, the Great Britain side wore a navy blue strip in honour of the host association. The gate receipts, totalling £35,000, helped boost the finances of FIFA, which had been damaged by the lack of competition during World War II. On that occasion, the Great Britain team consisted of:

Frank Swift (England), George Hardwick (England), Billy Hughes (Wales), Archie Macaulay (Scotland), Jackie Vernon (Ireland), Ron Burgess (Wales), Stanley Matthews (England), Wilf Mannion (England), Tommy Lawton (England), Billy Steel (Scotland), Billy Liddell (Scotland).

=== 1955: Irish FA's anniversary ===
The 1955 game was played to celebrate the Irish Football Association's seventy-fifth anniversary. For this reason, the match was held at Belfast's Windsor Park, and the British team took to the field wearing Northern Ireland's green strip. The Great Britain team fielded comprised:

Jack Kelsey (Wales), Peter Sillett (England), Joe McDonald (Scotland), Danny Blanchflower (Northern Ireland), John Charles (Wales), Bertie Peacock (Northern Ireland), Stanley Matthews (England), Bobby Johnstone (Scotland), Roy Bentley (England), Jimmy McIlroy (Northern Ireland), Billy Liddell (Scotland).

=== Other matches ===
An All British XI played the Football League at Goodison Park, Liverpool on 4 November 1939. The match, finishing 3-3 was on behalf of the Red Cross Fund, raising £1,214.

Two other games were played between Wales and a team representing the rest of the United Kingdom, with players from England, Scotland, and Northern Ireland. The first match, in 1951, commemorated the seventy-fifth anniversary of the Football Association of Wales. The second match, in 1969, commemorated the investiture of the Prince of Wales. In both cases, the England, Scotland and Northern Ireland select team played under the name of 'Rest of the United Kingdom'.

- 3 December 1951; Ninian Park, Cardiff: Wales 3–2 Rest of the United Kingdom
- 21 July 1969; Ninian Park, Cardiff: Wales 0–1 Rest of the United Kingdom

There was also a match played at Wembley in 1973 to commemorate the entry of the United Kingdom, Ireland and Denmark into the European Economic Community. This match, called "The Three" v "The Six", involved a select team from those three countries playing against a selection of players from the original six members of the EEC: West Germany, Belgium, Netherlands, Luxembourg, France and Italy.

Ten of the thirteen players used by "The Three" were from the United Kingdom, with only Johnny Giles and two Danish players representing the other two countries. Henning Jensen and Colin Stein scored as The Three won 2–0.

A Great British team lined up against another Rest of Europe XI in 1965 for Stanley Matthews' testimonial. Europe won 6–4. A Scotland XI team played a Rest of Great Britain team in a testimonial match for Alan Mullery; Scotland were defeated 3–2 at Craven Cottage on 22 March 1976.

== Results ==
23 April 1916 Journées du Poilu Sportif semifinals	(France) USFSA	0–0 (a.e.t.)	United Kingdom	Boulogne, France
		Report		Stadium: Pavillon des Princes; Attendance: 2500; Referee: Hjord (France)

10 May 1947 Home Nations return to FIFA	United Kingdom	6–1	Rest of Europe	Glasgow, Scotland
	Mannion 22', 33' (pen.); Steel 35'; Lawton 37', 82'; Parola 74' (o.g.)	Report	Nordahl 24'	Stadium: Hampden Park; Attendance: 137,000; Referee: George Reader (England)

13 August 1955 75th anniversary of the Irish Football Association	United Kingdom	1–4	Rest of Europe	Belfast, Northern Ireland
	Johnston 25'	Report	Vincent 27'; Vukas 77', 87', 88'	Stadium: Windsor Park; Attendance: 35,000; Referee: Jan Bronkhorst (Netherlands)

28 April 1965 Stanley Matthews Testimonial	United Kingdom	4–6	Rest of Europe	Stoke, England
	Douglas 12', 81'; Greaves 34'; Ritchie 75'	Report	van den Boer 4'; Puskás 7', 24'; Masopust 43'; Kubala 63'; Henderson 89'	Stadium: Victoria Ground, Attendance: 35,000; Referee: Arthur Ellis (England)

== At the Olympics ==
From the 1900 Summer Olympics to the 1972 Summer Olympics, and again for the 2012 Summer Olympics, the UK has competed in either the Olympic football tournament or its qualifying competition. During the first tournament, played as a demonstration sport at the 1900 Summer Olympics but retrospectively accredited by the IOC, Upton Park F.C. represented the UK and won gold. Following this Great Britain won gold medals at the 1908 and 1912 Games.

All 'Great Britain' Olympic football teams were organised by The Football Association (FA) of England with the acquiescence of the other Home Nations' football associations, and after the FA scrapped the distinction between professional and amateur players in 1974, no more British Olympic teams were entered.

Although professional players were allowed into the Olympics from 1992, no British teams were entered because the individual home nations, rather than a unified team, participated in the qualifying competition.

The 2012 Summer Olympics were hosted by London, which meant that Great Britain qualified as right of being host nation. After much discussion between the Home Nations and opposition from the Northern Irish, Scottish and Welsh associations, men's and women's teams organised by the English FA were entered to the 2012 Olympics.

For the 2020 Games in Tokyo, an agreement was reached between the four FAs for a women's team to complete in the event. The side reached the quarter finals of the tournament.

== At the Universiade ==
The United Kingdom participated as a single team in the Summer Universiade football competition's inaugural (men-only) 1979 edition, when the football tournament was still not official (a UK representative team had also participated in the 1962 Tournoi International Universitaire in Belgium, a historical predecessor to the Universiade tournament). The UK men's team played regularly in the official Universiade tournaments starting in 1985, with their last participation taking place in 2013. The UK men's team won three Universiade medals: two silver medals in 2011 and 2013 and a bronze medal in 1991.

A women's UK team first participated in the Summer Universiade football competition in the 2007 edition. They played in six editions overall, with their last participation taking place in 2017. The UK women's team won two Universiade medals: gold in 2013 and bronze in 2009.

== At the Challenge Kentish Cup ==
The UK also participates as a single men's team in the annual Challenge Kentish Cup for military personnel, which is the oldest European football cup still in existence. The UK military team plays friendly matches against armed forces teams from other nations, including regular fixtures against a team representing the Republic of Ireland's Defence Forces.

A UK women's military team was first formed in 1999, and has played matches against other national women defence forces as well as amateur non-military women's teams.
