= Ronaldo Lima =

Dutch footballer

Ronaldo Lima Duarte Lopes
Personal information
- Date of birth: 8 June 1998 (age 28)
- Place of birth: The Hague, Netherlands
- Height: 1.88 m (6 ft 2 in)
- Position: Forward

Team information
- Current team: HV & CV Quick

Youth career
- –2011: Sparta Rotterdam
- 2011–2014: Haaglandia
- 2014–2016: Alphense Boys
- 2016–2017: FC Utrecht

Senior career*
Years	Team	Apps	(Gls)
2017–2018	Den Bosch	2	(0)
2018	Alfaro	6	(3)
2019–	HV & CV Quick		
- * Club domestic league appearances and goals as of 16:08, 24 December 2019 (UTC)

Ronaldo Lima Duarte Lopes (born 8 June 1998) is a Dutch football player of Cape Verdean descent. He plays for HV & CV Quick.

== Club career ==
He made his Eerste Divisie debut for FC Den Bosch on 18 August 2017 in a game against Jong AZ.

== Personal life ==
He is a younger brother of Mailson Lima Duarte Lopes.
