= Football for Hope =

2005 association football match

Football for Hope was a FIFA-sponsored football match played between the Ronaldinho XI team and the Shevchenko XI team on 15 February 2005 at the Camp Nou in Barcelona in support of the relief effort after the 2004 Indian Ocean tsunami disaster.

Organised by FIFA and UEFA in consultation with the Royal Spanish Football Federation, and with support from FC Barcelona, who provided their stadium and staff free of charge, this benefit match for the victims of the tsunami saw an XI led by Ronaldinho, the 2004 FIFA World Player of the Year, beat a team captained by Andriy Shevchenko, the 2004 European Footballer of the Year, by six goals to three.

FIFA hoped to raise £7 million in support of the tsunami victims, around a third through the game itself. All proceeds from the Football For Hope match went to the FIFA/Asian Football Confederation Tsunami Solidarity Fund.

In 2011, FIFA won the Sport for Health Award at the Beyond Sport Awards ceremony.

== The match ==
The game itself, which was watched by some 35,000 spectators, was a typical charity affair with a predictable pace, although the fans were entertained by a feast of goals. The World XI (Ronaldinho) won the Europe XI (Shevchenko) by 6-3.

Cameroon's Samuel Eto'o and Senegal's Henri Camara both scored two goals, which, along with strikes from Ronaldinho and the South Korean Cha Du-ri, helped the FIFA World Player of the Year's team to victory. Alessandro Del Piero, Gianfranco Zola and David Suazo scored for Andriy Shevchenko's side.

== Shevchenko XI ==
*Coaches:

- Marcello Lippi — Italy
- (France) Arsène Wenger — Arsenal

Note: Flags indicate national team as defined under FIFA eligibility rules; some limited exceptions apply. Players may hold more than one non-FIFA nationality.

No.	Pos.	Nation	Player
1	GK	ESP	Iker Casillas
2	DF	BEL	Vincent Kompany
3	DF	URU	Paolo Montero
4	DF	GEO	Kakha Kaladze
5	DF	GHA	Samuel Kuffour
6	MF	ENG	Steven Gerrard
7	FW	UKR	Andriy Shevchenko (c)
8	MF	FRA	Ludovic Giuly
9	MF	ITA	Alessandro Del Piero
10	MF	FRA	Zinedine Zidane
11	MF	ESP	Raúl
12	GK	ITA	Francesco Toldo
13	MF	GER	Sebastian Deisler
14	MF	SUI	Johann Vogel
15	FW	TUR	Hakan Şükür
16	MF	FIN	Jari Litmanen

No.	Pos.	Nation	Player
18	MF	ITA	Gianfranco Zola
20	FW	HON	David Suazo
21	DF	FRA	Lilian Thuram
22	FW	FRA	Thierry Henry
23	MF	ENG	David Beckham
—	GK	ITA	Gianluigi Buffon
—	DF	FRA	Christian Karembeu
—	DF	ESP	Carles Puyol
—	DF	ITA	Paolo Maldini
—	DF	NED	Jaap Stam
—	FW	ITA	Roberto Baggio
—	MF	GER	Michael Ballack
—	FW	ITA	Francesco Totti
—	FW	CZE	Pavel Nedvěd
—	MF	FRA	Patrick Vieira
—	MF	RUS	Sergei Semak

== Ronaldinho XI ==
Coaches:

- Carlos Alberto Parreira — Brazil
- (Netherlands) Frank Rijkaard — Barcelona

Note: Flags indicate national team as defined under FIFA eligibility rules; some limited exceptions apply. Players may hold more than one non-FIFA nationality.

No.	Pos.	Nation	Player
1	GK	BRA	Dida
2	DF	BRA	Cafu
3	DF	COL	Iván Córdoba
4	DF	MEX	Rafael Márquez
5	DF	RSA	Lucas Radebe
6	DF	GHA	Samuel Kuffour
7	MF	JPN	Hidetoshi Nakata
8	MF	IRN	Mehdi Mahdavikia
9	FW	CMR	Samuel Eto'o
10	FW	BRA	Ronaldinho (c)
11	MF	KOR	Park Ji-sung
12	GK	CMR	Carlos Kameni
13	FW	NGA	Obafemi Martins
14	FW	SEN	Henri Camara
15	DF	TUN	Radhi Jaïdi
16	MF	RSA	Delron Buckley
17	DF	CMR	Rigobert Song

No.	Pos.	Nation	Player
18	MF	USA	DaMarcus Beasley
19	MF	KOR	Cha Du-ri
20	MF	POR	Deco
22	MF	BRA	Kaká
—	DF	BRA	Cris
—	DF	ARG	Gabriel Heinze
—	DF	BRA	Lúcio
—	DF	ARG	Javier Zanetti
—	FW	BRA	Adriano
—	MF	ARG	Esteban Cambiasso
—	FW	CIV	Didier Drogba
—	MF	AUS	Brett Emerton
—	MF	GHA	Michael Essien
—	MF	BRA	Juninho
—	MF	CHN	Li Tie
—	FW	BRA	Ronaldo

== See also ==
- World Cricket Tsunami Appeal
- IRB Rugby Aid Match
- UEFA Celebration Match
