= Omari Tetradze =

Russian footballer (born 1969)

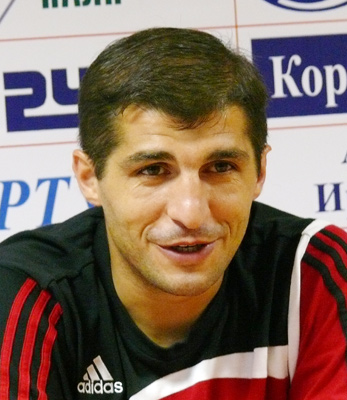

Personal information
- Birth name: Omari Mikhailovich Osipov
- Date of birth: 13 October 1969 (age 57)
- Place of birth: Velospiri, Georgian SSR, Soviet Union
- Height: 1.75 m (5 ft 9 in)
- Positions: Right-back; defensive midfielder

Team information
- Current team: Ufa (manager)

Youth career
- 1978–1982: DYuSSh Avaza Tbilisi
- 1982–1987: FSh-35 Minprosa Tbilisi

Senior career*
Years	Team	Apps	(Gls)
1987–1990	Dinamo Tbilisi	24	(0)
1990–1991	Mertskhali Ozurgeti	30	(4)
1991–1995	Dynamo Moscow	101	(11)
1995–1997	Alania Vladikavkaz	61	(1)
1997–1999	Roma	15	(0)
1999–2001	PAOK	60	(2)
2001–2002	Alania Vladikavkaz	29	(0)
2002–2004	Anzhi Makhachkala	40	(1)
2004–2005	Krylia Sovetov Samara	26	(0)
Total		386	(19)

International career
1991	Soviet Union	5	(0)
1992–2002	Russia	40	(1)

Managerial career
- 2003: Anzhi Makhachkala (assistant)
- 2007–2010: Anzhi Makhachkala
- 2010–2011: Volga Nizhny Novgorod
- 2012–2013: Khimki
- 2013–2014: Zhetysu
- 2015–2016: Yenisey Krasnoyarsk
- 2016–2017: Tobol
- 2023: Saburtalo Tbilisi
- 2025: Ufa (sporting director)
- 2025–: Ufa
- * Club domestic league appearances and goals

Omari Mikhaylovich Tetradze (Russian: Омари Михайлович Тетрадзе, Georgian: ომარ თეთრაძე, Greek: Ομάρι Τετράντζε; born 13 October 1969 as Omari Mikhaylovich Osipov) is a professional football manager and former player who is the manager of Russian club Ufa. During his playing career, he played as a defender or midfielder. Born in Georgia, he played for the Russia national team.

== Early life ==
Tetradze was born in Velispiri, Georgian SSR as Omari Mikhaylovich Osipov (the original surname of his family was Iosifidis) to ethnic Greek parents. At the age of 18, he decided to change surname when he turned professional. It was the run-up to the USSR breakup and the nationalist sentiments in Georgia were strong enough to affect the young player's career. Because of that, Omari took his maternal grandmother's Georgian surname – Tetradze. Later he considered restoring his original surname, but decided it would cause too many problems.

== Club career ==
At club level, Tetradze played for Dinamo Tbilisi, FC Dynamo Moscow, Alania Vladikavkaz (where he won a Russian league championship medal in 1995), AS Roma, and PAOK FC (Greece).

== International career ==
Tetradze played for Russia at international level, and appeared at World Cup 1994 and Euro 1996. At the latter tournament, he played superbly in each of Russia's three games despite the team's poor results, and was arguably the best right-back in the competition.

== Managing career ==
After finishing his playing career in 2005, Tetradze became an assistant coach at Krylia Sovetov Samara. He was later the manager of Anzhi Makhachkala. He threatened to resign the post in September 2008 following a 1–0 defeat against Belgorod, but subsequently stayed on as manager. Anzhi finally returned to Russian Premier League for 2010 season after finishing champion in First Division. On 19 March 2010 the Coach has quit Anzhi Makhachkala.

In September 2014, Tetradze and his coaching staff left FC Zhetysu by mutual consent.

On 30 May 2016, Tetradze was appointed as manager of FC Tobol. He left Tobol by mutual consent on 27 June 2017.

== Personal life ==
In the early 1990s he received Greek citizenship but later renounced it. Tetradze considers himself to be a Greek by ethnicity, but says Georgia is his homeland.

== Career statistics ==
Appearances and goals by club, season and competition
Club	Season	League		
Club	Season	Division	Apps	Goals
Dinamo Tbilisi	1987	Soviet Top League	0	0
Dinamo Tbilisi	1988	Soviet Top League	9	0
Dinamo Tbilisi	1989	Soviet Top League	15	0
Dinamo Tbilisi	1990	Soviet Top League		
Dinamo Tbilisi	Total			
Mertskhali Ozurgeti				
Dynamo Moscow	1991	Soviet Top League	21	0
Dynamo Moscow	1992	Russian Top League	25	6
Dynamo Moscow	1993	Russian Top League	32	4
Dynamo Moscow	1994	Russian Top League	23	1
Dynamo Moscow	Total		101	11
Alania Vladikavkaz	1995	Russian Top League	30	0
Alania Vladikavkaz	1996	Russian Top League	31	1
Alania Vladikavkaz	Total		61	1
Roma	1996–97	Serie A	8	0
Roma	1997–98	Serie A	7	0
Roma	1998–99	Serie A	0	0
Roma	Total		15	0
PAOK	1999-00	Super League Greece	27	0
PAOK	2000–01	Super League Greece	22	2
PAOK	2001–02	Super League Greece	5	0
PAOK	Total		54	2
Alania Vladikavkaz	2002	Russian Premier League	29	0
Anzhi Makhachkala	2003	Russian First Division	40	1
Krylia Sovetov	2004	Russian Premier League	14	0
Krylia Sovetov	2005	Russian Premier League	12	0
Krylia Sovetov	Total		26	0

== Honours ==
=== Player ===
- Russian Premier League winner in 1995 (with Spartak-Alania)
- Greek Cup winner in 2001 (with PAOK)
- Russian Premier League runner-up: 1994, 1996.
- Georgian Umaglesi Liga winner: 1990.
- Russian Cup finalist: 2004.

=== Manager ===
Anzhi Makhachkala

- Russian First Division winner: 2009
- Russian First Division best manager: 2009.

Volga Nizhny Novgorod

- Russian First Division runner-up: 2010
