= Dominique Lemoine =

Belgian footballer

Personal information
- Date of birth: 12 March 1966 (age 60)
- Place of birth: Tournai, Belgium
- Height: 1.73 m (5 ft 8 in)
- Position: Midfielder

Youth career
- 1976–1980: FC Wiers
- 1980–1982: US Valenciennes

Senior career*
| Years | Team | Apps | (Gls) |
| 1982–1983 | US Valenciennes | 0 | (0) |
| 1983–1986 | K.V. Kortrijk | 53 | (8) |
| 1986–1988 | K.S.K. Beveren | 42 | (3) |
| 1988–1990 | FC Mulhouse | 28 | (1) |
| 1990–1992 | K.V. Kortrijk | 41 | (5) |
| 1992–1997 | R.E. Mouscron | 127 | (41) |
| 1997 | R.C.D. Espanyol | 8 | (0) |
| 1997–1998 | Standard de Liège | 5 | (0) |
| 1999–2000 | R.A.E.C. Mons | 10 | (3) |

International career
| 1997 | Belgium | 4 | (0) |
- * Club domestic league appearances and goals

Dominique Lemoine (born 12 March 1966) is a retired international Belgian footballer.

Despite his short career with the national team, he started as a left back in the Europe XI which faced the Rest of the World team in the friendly match that happened on the day of the 1998 FIFA World Cup group draw.
