= Frits Vandenboer =

Belgian footballer

Personal information
- Full name: Godfried Vandenboer
- Date of birth: 8 May 1934
- Place of birth: Overpelt, Belgium
- Date of death: 6 August 2012 (aged 78)
- Position: Forward

Senior career*
Years	Team	Apps	(Gls)
1958–1961	Anderlecht		
1961–1968	Sint-Truidense		
1968–1969	Royal Antwerp	19	(8)
1969–1971	EVV Eindhoven		

International career
1959–1966	Belgium	7	(2)
- * Club domestic league appearances and goals

Godfried "Frits" Vandenboer (8 May 1934 – 6 August 2012) was a Belgian footballer who played for Anderlecht, Sint-Truidense and Royal Antwerp as well at the Belgium national team.
