= Jollof derby =

Football encounter between Nigeria and Ghana

Jollof Derby
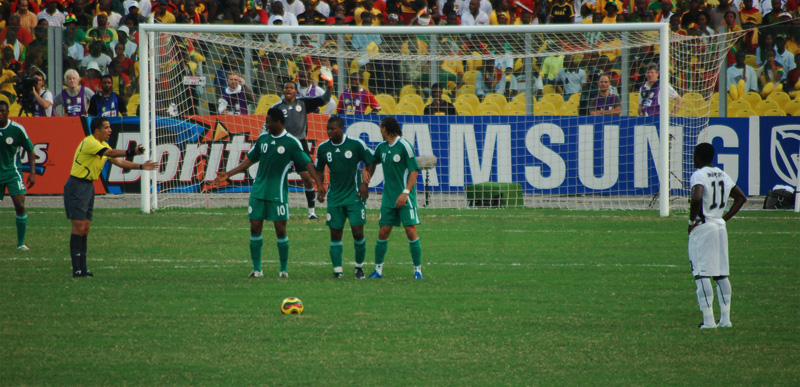
- 2008 Africa Cup of Nations Quarter-Final
- Location: Africa (CAF)
- Teams: Ghana; Nigeria
- First meeting: Ghana 1–0 Nigeria; Friendly (16 October 1950)
- Latest meeting: Nigeria 2–1 Ghana; Unity Cup; (28 May 2025)

Statistics
- Total meetings: 59
- All-time series: Ghana: 25; Draw: 19; Nigeria: 13
- Largest victory: Ghana 7–0 Nigeria; Jalco Cup; (1 June 1955)

Jollof derby is the moniker given to any encounter between the national football teams of Nigeria and Ghana. The derby takes its name from the nations' long-standing rivalry over who makes the best Jollof rice. The rivalry between Ghana and Nigeria extends beyond the realm of sports and has a deep-rooted history. The divide extends beyond just football and encompasses aspects of culture, economy, and social status in West Africa. Debates have arisen regarding the origins and influences of music, the supreme culinary delight (such as Jollof rice), and occasionally, the most robust economic system. Due to their shared colonial histories, there are natural areas of cultural overlap between these two nations. This overlap can be observed in their cuisine, traditions, cinema, music, and the use of Pidgin English. Consequently, collaborations between individuals from these two countries have been common.

The introduction of Ghana's Aliens Compliance Order in 1969 resulted in a gradual escalation of tensions between the two nations. Nigeria then implemented a comparable law in 1983, leading to the mass expulsion of Ghanaian residents. The intricate geopolitical and socio-cultural subtleties have contributed to the heightened intensity of football matches between these two nations. Despite the occurrence of these political conflicts between these nations, there is no genuine enmity between them or their respective supporters. Instead, they engage in friendly banter rather than harbouring outright hostility. CNN ranked it 7th among the world's Top 10 international football rivalries and described it as the biggest rivalry on the African continent.

The sport has been played since prior to both countries' respective independence, and the matchup is among the oldest and most-played rivalries in African football. The football competition reflects the long-standing socio-economic rivalry between the two nations, which are two of the five Anglophone nations in West Africa and home to the largest populations in the region.

The two sides often meet in the African Cup of Nations (AFCON) tournaments, Olympic games, and WAFU tournaments. Apart from the AFCON Final, it is one of Africa's most important national football matches and one of the most watched sporting events. The rivalry is considered one of the most intense in sports. This match has seen remarkable goal celebrations from both teams, with the opposition frequently mocked.

Ghana leads Nigeria in competitive match head-to-head results with 25 victories and 19 draws. Nigeria has had more success at the World Cup, with a total of 21 points since their debut in 1994 in the United States. Ghana has accumulated 19 points since their first appearance at the tournament in Germany in 2006.

== History ==
The first official encounter between the two was a World Cup qualifier in 1960, according to FIFA. Both national teams, however, had already competed in several domestic friendlies and competitions against foreign nations since 1950. Both of these West African countries' national teams were created when they were still British protectorates. The modern nation of Ghana was then known as the Gold Coast, and players of the Nigerian squad donned scarlet tops over white shorts and were known as the "Red Devils" before adopting their national colors of green and white.

The Gold Coast Football Federation, established in 1920, was more than two decades older than Nigeria's, and its team was more well known among Britain's colonies. The Gold Coast national team had already toured England, playing friendly matches against various clubs, prior to what is commonly considered to be the first official International "A" match in 1951. Nigeria, not to be outdone, followed suit, albeit with less success. Despite their disparate histories, Nigeria was able to defeat their fledgling opponents 5–0 at home.

For the rest of the 1950s, the two teams were fairly evenly matched, generally swapping victories on their own turfs, but Ghana would go on to dominate the tournament between the 1960s and the early 2000s, winning the Africa Cup of Nations four times to Nigeria's two. Meanwhile, Nigeria would have more success in intercontinental play, qualifying for the FIFA World Cup many times and reaching the greatest FIFA ranking in Africa of No. 5 in the world in 1994. In both that year and 1998, the team made historic trips to the knockout stages, defeating Spain and coming within minutes of overcoming world superpower and eventual 1994 finalists Italy.

=== Regional Cup era ===
Until 1960 Egypt was the only African nation to ever participate in FIFA World Cup qualifying. Since decolonization had yet to begin in earnest, few nations on the African continent were able to assemble national teams that were internationally recognized and thus eligible for FIFA competitions. Various rivalry cups and tournaments were instituted instead. During the 1950s and 1960s, Nigeria and Ghana would compete in three cup competitions.

==== 1951–59 Jalco Cup ====
Nigeria Red Devils - Jalco Cup Champions - 1956

There are various records of matches having been played between the national teams dating back to 1938. These unofficial matches list the scores and winners but, as with the match in 1938, specific details such as player lineups and often even the exact date that the match took place, are unknown. The first well-documented matches were organized under the banner of the Jalco Cup, a competition sponsored by the Ford Motor Company by way of a subsidiary, Joe Allen & Company (J.Allen & Co.) for whom the cup was named. It is generally held to be the beginning of the rivalry's historical record. The cup was contested between the two countries every year except 1952.

==== 1959–67 Dr Kwame Nkrumah Gold Cup ====
After Ghanaian independence the country's football officials harbored ambitions of competing in the Olympic Games. To this end they met with officials from the most prominent West African nations, including Nigeria, to create the West African Soccer Federation. The aim of the new federation was to sponsor a regional football tournament which would help to raise the level of the game in the respective nations for future participation in international tournaments. The result was the Dr. Kwame Nkrumah Gold Cup, also called the West African Soccer Federation championship.

The tournament had middling success; it was plagued from the outset by organizational and funding shortfalls. In the initial tournament in 1959, the qualifying stages were only partially completed. In addition, Nigeria did not appear for the semifinal of that tournament, and the match had to be replaced with an exhibition game played as a stand-in. Also, the fourth and final tournament in 1967 was postponed following issues having to do with the lack of lighting during the qualifying matches and subsequent complaints on the issue by the Sierra Leone players. There is no record of the final tournament ever having been completed.

Despite these issues, the tournament would see two matches played between Ghana and Nigeria, the high point being when the two sides met in the final of the 1960 tournament in Lagos, Nigeria in which Ghana won 3–0. Both matches played between the two sides during the life of the tournament were won by Ghana by a combined score of 8–0.

==== 1961–67 Azikiwe Cup ====
The figurative successor to the Jalco Cup, the Azikiwe Cup was named for Dr. Nnamdi Azikiwe, who was Nigeria's first postcolonial president. The tournament was initially contested under the same rotating, single match, format as the Jalco Cup, but was later switched to an aggregate home and away setup with each team hosting one match apiece.

Unlike the Jalco Cup, the teams did not share the cup in the event of a tie under the single leg format, but rather the cup returned to the nation that had held it. This only occurred in 1962 when Ghana secured a 0-0 result in Lagos and were able to retain the cup that they initially won in the competition in 1961. Ghana won or retained the cup in every year that it was contested, continuing a dominance in the rivalry stemming in the early 1960s broken only during a brief period in the mid-1970s and 1980s and lasting until early 2000s.

== Honours ==
=== Major official titles comparison ===
Senior titles	Ghana	Nigeria
African Cup of Nations	4	3
Afro-Asian Cup of Nations	0	1
Total senior titles	4	4
Youth titles	Ghana	Nigeria
Summer Olympics	0	1
African Games	2	1
FIFA U-20 World Cup	1	0
FIFA U-17 World Cup	2	5
U-23 Africa Cup of Nations	0	1
U-20 Africa Cup of Nations	4	7
U-17 Africa Cup of Nations	2	2
Total youth titles	11	17
Grand total	15	21

=== Friendly competitions ===
All the tournaments played between both countries exclusively:

Senior titles	Ghana	Nigeria
Jalco Cup/Dr Kwame Nkrumah Gold Cup/Azikiwe Cup	8	8

=== Awards ===
==== African National Team of the Year ====
The team of the year award was organized by France Football from 1980 to 2004, and by CAF from 2004 onwards.

Award	Ghana	Nigeria
1st	3 (Note: 1983, 2006, 2010)	4 (Note: 1992, 1993, 1994, 2013)
2nd	1 (Note: 2005)	4 (Note: 1980, 1991, 2001, 2014)
3rd	5 (Note: 1981, 1982, 1992, 2009, 2015)	6 (Note: 1983, 1984, 1988, 1998, 2002, 2004)
Total	9	14

==== African Player of the Year ====
The African Footballer of the Year award, presented to the best African footballer each year, has been conferred by the Confederation of African Football (CAF) since 1992. An earlier African Footballer of the Year Golden Ball award was given out between 1970 and 1994 by France Football magazine.

Award	Ghana	Nigeria
France Football award (1970–1994), Afrique Football award (Etoile d'Or) (1991–2003) / CAF award (1992–present)
1st	6 (Note: Ibrahim Sunday (1971), Karim Abdul Razak (1978), Abedi Pele (1991, 1992, 1992, 1993))	6 (Note: Rashidi Yekini (1993), Emmanuel Amunike (1994), Nwankwo Kanu (1992, 1999), Victor Ikpeba (1997), Victor Osimhen (2023))
2nd	8 (Note: Robert Mensah (1971), Adolf Armah (1979), Opoku Nti (1983), Tony Yeboah (1993), Sammy Kuffour (1999, 2001), Michael Essien (2007), Asamoah Gyan (2010))	6 (Note: Segun Odegbami (1980), Emmanuel Amunike (1994, 1995), Jay-Jay Okocha (1998, 1998), Mikel John Obi (2013))
3rd	7 (Note: Nii Lamptey (1991), Tony Yeboah (1992, 1993), Michael Essien (2005, 2006, 2008, 2009), André Ayew ( 2011))	10 (Note: Segun Odegbami (1977), Rashidi Yekini (1993), Daniel Amokachi (1994, 1995, 1996), Taribo West (1997), Sunday Oliseh (1998), Jay-Jay Okocha (2003, 2004), Vincent Enyeama (2014))
Total	21	22

==== BBC African Sports Personality of the Year ====
The BBC African Sports Personality of the Year (previously known as the BBC African Sports Star of the Year and the BBC African Footballer of the Year) was an annual award given to the best African sports personality of the year as voted by the BBC radio listeners.

Award	Ghana	Nigeria
BBC African Sports Personality of the Year	5 (Note: Abedi Pele (1992), Samuel Kuffour (2001), Michael Essien (2006), Asamoah Gyan (2010), André Ayew (2011))	5 (Note: Emmanuel Amuneke (1996), Nwankwo Kanu (1997, 1999), Jay-Jay Okocha (2003, 2004))

== Statistics ==
=== Overall ===
Nigeria and Ghana have played 56 times in all tournaments, including friendly matches. Ghana has defeated Nigeria 25 times, with Nigeria winning 13 of the matches. On 19 occasions, matches between the two have finished in a tie. Nigeria has had more success at the World Cup, with a total of 21 points since their debut in 1994 in the United States. Ghana has accumulated 19 points since their first appearance at the tournament in Germany in 2006. Nigeria's 21 points were earned over six competitions, whereas Ghana's 19 were earned in just three. After reaching the quarterfinals in South Africa in 2010, Ghana has progressed further in a World Cup than Nigeria. Nigeria has only ever advanced to the second round three times, in 1994, 1998, and 2014.

Matches	Ghana Total Wins	Draws	Nigeria Total Wins	Goal Difference
57	25	19	13	92:59

Ghana Home Matches	Wins	Draws	Losses	Last Defeat
23	16	6	1	15 Dec 02

Nigeria Home Matches	Wins	Draws	Losses	Last Defeat
20	8	9	3	10 Feb 73

Neutral Venue Matches	Won by Ghana	Draws	Won by Nigeria	Latest Result
13	6	4	4	11 October 2011; 0-0 Draw

=== List of matches ===
#	Date	Competition	Venue	Home team	Score	Away team
1	16 October 1950	Friendly	Accra, Greater Accra Region, Gold Coast	Gold Coast*	1–0	Nigeria
2	20 October 1951	Jalco Cup	Lagos, Lagos State, Nigeria	Nigeria	5–0	Gold Coast*
3	11 October 1953	Jalco Cup	Accra, Greater Accra Region, Gold Coast	Gold Coast*	1–0	Nigeria
4	30 October 1954	Jalco Cup	Lagos, Lagos State, Nigeria	Nigeria	3–0	Gold Coast*
5	28 May 1955	Friendly	Accra, Greater Accra Region, Gold Coast	Gold Coast*	1–0	Nigeria
6	30 October 1955	Jalco Cup	Accra, Greater Accra Region, Gold Coast	Gold Coast*	7–0	Nigeria
7	27 October 1956	Jalco Cup	Lagos, Lagos State, Nigeria	Nigeria	3–0	Gold Coast*
8	27 October 1957	Jalco Cup	Accra, Greater Accra Region, Ghana	Ghana	3–3	Nigeria
9	25 October 1958	Jalco Cup	Lagos, Lagos State, Nigeria	Nigeria	3–2	Ghana
10	21 November 1959	Jalco Cup	Accra, Greater Accra Region, Ghana	Ghana	5–2	Nigeria
11	27 August 1960	1962 FIFA World Cup qualification	Accra, Greater Accra Region, Ghana	Ghana	4–1	Nigeria
12	10 September 1960	1962 FIFA World Cup qualification	Lagos, Lagos State, Nigeria	Nigeria	2–2	Ghana
13	9 October 1960	1960 Nkrumah Cup Final (West African Soccer Federation championship)	Lagos, Lagos State, Nigeria	Nigeria	0–3	Ghana
14	29 October 1960	Independence Cup	Lagos, Lagos State, Nigeria	Nigeria	1–1	Ghana
15	8 April 1961	1963 African Cup of Nations Qualifiers	Lagos, Lagos State, Nigeria	Nigeria	0–0	Ghana
16	30 April 1961	1963 African Cup of Nations Qualifiers	Accra, Greater Accra Region, Ghana	Ghana	2–2	Nigeria
17	1 June 1961	WAC	Accra, Greater Accra Region, Ghana	Ghana	3–0	Nigeria
18	17 December 1961	1961 Azikiwe Cup	Accra, Greater Accra Region, Ghana	Ghana	5–1	Nigeria
19	3 January 1962	1963 African Cup of Nations Preliminary	Addis Ababa, Ethiopia	Nigeria	1–1	Ghana
20	10 November 1962	1962 Azikiwe Cup	Surulere, Lagos State, Nigeria	Nigeria	0–0	Ghana
21	24 February 1963	1961-63 Nkrumah Cup Semifinal	Kumasi, Ashanti Region, Ghana	Ghana	5–0	Nigeria
22	30 October 1965	1965 Azikiwe Cup	Surulere, Lagos State, Nigeria	Nigeria	0–4	Ghana
23	7 November 1965	1965 Azikiwe Cup	Accra, Greater Accra Region, Ghana	Ghana	3–0	Nigeria
24	28 January 1967	1966 Azikiwe Cup	Lagos, Lagos State, Nigeria	Nigeria	2–2	Ghana
25	12 February 1967	1966 Azikiwe Cup	Accra, Greater Accra Region, Ghana	Ghana	2–0	Nigeria
26	21 October 1967	1967 Azikiwe Cup	Accra, Greater Accra Region, Ghana	Ghana	2–1	Nigeria
27	23 December 1967	1967 Azikiwe Cup	Lagos, Lagos State, Nigeria	Nigeria	2–2	Ghana
28	10 May 1969	1970 FIFA World Cup qualification	Lagos, Lagos State, Nigeria	Nigeria	2–1	Ghana
29	18 May 1969	1970 FIFA World Cup qualification	Accra, Greater Accra Region, Ghana	Ghana	1–1	Nigeria
30	8 January 1973	All African Games Group A	Surulere, Lagos State, Nigeria	Nigeria	4–2	Ghana
31	10 February 1973	1974 FIFA World Cup qualification	Surulere, Lagos State, Nigeria	Nigeria	2–3	Ghana
32	22 February 1973	1974 FIFA World Cup qualification	Accra, Greater Accra Region, Ghana	Ghana	0–0	Nigeria
33	31 August 1975	Friendly	Accra, Greater Accra Region, Ghana	Ghana	3–0	Nigeria
34	8 March 1978	1978 African Cup of Nations	Accra, Greater Accra Region, Ghana	Ghana	1–1	Nigeria
35	21 July 1978	All African Games Group B	Algiers, Algeria	Nigeria	0–0	Ghana
36	1 May 1983	Friendly	Accra, Greater Accra Region, Ghana	Ghana	1–0	Nigeria
37	5 March 1984	1984 African Cup of Nations	Bouaké, (Ivory Coast) Côte d'Ivoire	Ghana	1–2	Nigeria
38	27 July 1986	CEDEAO Cup	Monrovia, Liberia	Ghana	2–0	Nigeria
39	6 February 1987	ZONE 3 Semi-final	Monrovia, Liberia	Ghana	3–1	Nigeria
40	1 September 1990	1992 African Cup of Nations Qualifiers	Kumasi, Ashanti Region, Ghana	Ghana	1–0	Nigeria
41	13 April 1991	1992 African Cup of Nations Qualifiers	Surulere, Lagos State, Nigeria	Nigeria	0–0	Ghana
42	2 November 1991	CEDEAO Cup 3rd place match	Abidjan, (Ivory Coast) Côte d'Ivoire	Ghana	1–0	Nigeria
43	23 January 1992	1992 African Cup of Nations	Dakar, Senegal	Ghana	2–1	Nigeria
44	9 March 1994	Friendly	Lagos, Lagos State, Nigeria	Nigeria	0–0	Ghana
45	28 August 1999	Friendly	Lagos, Lagos State, Nigeria	Nigeria	0–0	Ghana
46	10 March 2001	2002 FIFA World Cup qualification	Accra, Greater Accra Region, Ghana	Ghana	0–0	Nigeria
47	28 July 2001	2002 FIFA World Cup qualification	Port Harcourt, Lagos State, Nigeria	Nigeria	3–0	Ghana
48	3 February 2002	2002 Africa Cup of Nations	Stade du 26 Mars, Bamako Mali	Nigeria	1–0	Ghana
49	15 December 2002	Friendly	Accra, Greater Accra Region, Ghana	Ghana	0–1	Nigeria
50	23 February 2003	Friendly	Warri, Delta State, Nigeria	Nigeria	0–0	Ghana
51	30 May 2003	LG Cup Semi-final	Abuja National Stadium, Abuja, Nigeria	Nigeria	3–1	Ghana
52	23 January 2006	2006 Africa Cup of Nations	Port Said, Egypt	Nigeria	1–0	Ghana
53	6 February 2007	Friendly	Griffin Park, London, England	Ghana	4–1	Nigeria
54	3 February 2008	2008 Africa Cup of Nations	Ohene Djan Stadium, Accra, Ghana	Ghana	2–1	Nigeria
55	28 January 2010	2010 Africa Cup of Nations	Luanda, Angola	Ghana	1–0	Nigeria
56	11 October 2011	Friendly	Vicarage Road, Watford, England	Ghana	0–0	Nigeria
57	25 March 2022	2022 FIFA World Cup qualification	Baba Yara Stadium Ghana	Ghana	0–0	Nigeria
58	29 March 2022	2022 FIFA World Cup qualification	Abuja, Federal Capital Territory, Nigeria	Nigeria	1–1	Ghana
59	28 May 2025	2025 Unity Cup	Brentford Community Stadium, London, England	Nigeria	2–1	Ghana

* Ghana was organized under the Gold Coast Football Federation from this time until its independence

- Table lists only senior team competitions. Olympics, underage competition and African Nations Championship matches are excluded
- Matches which are won after extra time with penalty kicks are listed as draws, per official FIFA designation.

== Incidents and historical matches ==
=== 1951 Jalco Cup (5-0 thumping) ===
The first home match Nigeria played against Ghana took place in Lagos in October 1951. The match was attended by 8,000 spectators. Nigeria (then the Red Devils) beat the Black Stars, triumphing 5–0 in the then-yearly football clash between the neighbouring West African rivals (the JALCO Cup). The goal scorers for Nigeria were Peter Anieke in the 35th minute, Cyril Asoluka in the 40th minute, Titus Okere in the 58th minute, Friday Okoh in the 67th minute, and Cyril again in the 88th minute to collectively spell out 'GHANA' on the scoreboard.

This match, hosted in Lagos, stands as Ghana's worst defeat ever inflicted by any African opponent.

=== 1955 Jalco Cup (7-0 thumping and bonus saga) ===
The 1955 Jalco Cup was hosted by Ghana (then the Gold Coast) in Accra. The game ended with a 7–0 win for Ghana, which saw Ghana win the Jalco Cup for the third time to even the Jalco Cup honours, three trophies to three against Nigeria. The goal scorers for Gold Coast included C. K. Gyamfi with a hat-trick, Baba Yara netting twice, and Oscar Gespar and James Adjei each contributing a goal. The match drew an audience of 25,000 spectators, and by halftime, Gold Coast had already established a commanding lead of 6–0. Before the game, there were widespread reports of unrest among Nigerian players, including individuals like Peter Anieke and Gowin 'Opel' Ironkwe, who were reportedly seeking payment prior to the match. Such demands were quite unusual for that era. The Nigerian Football Association responded by suspending Anieke and Ironkwe for their perceived lack of discipline and poor performance following the denial of their bonus request. Furthermore, there were speculations that some players may have received bribes from the Gold Coast team, but these allegations were never substantiated.

The result remains the heaviest defeat ever suffered by the Nigerian national football team. The game is remembered for Ghanaians taunting Nigerians about how each goal represented each letter in the word 'NIGERIA'. These jokes continued even after two decades, when the fixture was played. According to Elizabeth Ohene, it became the stuff of legends, casting its shadow over every conversation, be it private or on a national level, between the two nations for many years.

=== 1960 Summer Olympics football Men's qualification (Witch doctor allegation) ===
In the initial stage of the 1960 Summer Olympics qualifiers, Ghana and Nigeria clashed in a two-legged match. The first leg was played in Lagos, Nigeria, on 10 October 1959. Nigeria won the game 3–1. On 25 October 1959, the return leg was hosted by Ghana in Accra, and Ghana won the game 4–1 to qualify for the next round of the qualifiers.

A Nigerian sports journalist alleged that the Ghanaian team brought in a witch doctor to cast a spell on the Nigerian team ahead of the Olympic qualifying match. The journalist claimed that he managed to infiltrate the Ghanaian camp the day before the game by disguising himself as a Ghanaian. During his observation, he reported witnessing the players donning black thread rings, consuming a dark liquid from a tumbler, sitting around a black-painted skull, and engaging in war chants.

Furthermore, the journalist described a ritual performed by the witch doctor involving juju dolls that represented the opposing team. In a significant moment during the game, the witch doctor tied the legs of some of these dolls when Nigeria was in an attacking position.

=== 1974 FIFA World Cup qualification (Lagos riot) ===
Ghana faced Nigeria once more for a World Cup Qualifier in Lagos Nigeria on 10 February 1973. Prior to the fixture, Ghana had lost to Nigeria in the 1973 All-Africa Games group stage fixture about a month earlier.

The team was met by over 40 journalists at the airport who asked questions. Tensions were already high but rather escalated when the then captain of the Black Stars, Malik Jabir, granted an interview to the press upon the arrival of the Ghanaian team. In the interview, Jabir told the press that in a match between Ghana and Nigeria, everybody knows Ghana will always win. He revealed that this statement spread throughout Nigeria, and he was referred to as "Captain wey dey yap."

Upon the arrival of the Ghana team bus at the stadium, Nigerian football fans blocked the entrance, demanding that he disembark. Fortunately, security intervened and allowed the Black Stars to pass. Tensions carried onto the pitch, with the Nigerian captain strongly objecting to the airport interview. In front of both teams, the Nigerian captain questioned Jabir's fitness to be the Ghana captain. In response, Jabir admitted that he made a crude remark that everyone present heard.

Yakubu Mambo put Nigeria in the lead 15 minutes after the game began. Ghana then drew level with a penalty kick that was converted by Kwasi Owusu. This penalty decision was the result of a Nigerian defender handling the ball under pressure in the Nigerian penalty box. In the 40th minute, Nigeria earned a freekick that resulted in chaos in the Ghanaian penalty box after the ball was kicked. Yakubu Mambo then capitalised on the situation to put Nigeria in the lead before the first half ended. 10 minutes after the second half began, Ghana captain Malik Jabir found Kwasi Owusu with a pass, which he scored to bring the scores level at 2-2.

After the game was level at 2-2, Nigeria switched playing styles but were still forced to play defensively. Jabir provided a cross that resulted in a scramble at the goal mouth, leading to Kwasi Owusu's winner in the 82nd minute. Chaos erupted at the stadium. According to the BBC, the game was abandoned right after Ghana's late winner. The players were held hostage on the pitch, and they were unable to make their way to the dressing room because the fans threw bottles at them. Players had to seek shelter in the middle of the pitch.

The then-military governor of Lagos State, Mobolaji Johnson, intervened by leading a group of armed personnel to protect and escort the team out of the pitch. The then-president of Nigeria, Yakubu Gowon, then sent an armoured vehicle to evacuate the players to the team hotel. The late General Kutu Acheampong then provided a plane to transport the Ghana team back to Accra.

The Ghanaian support that accompanied the team to Nigeria for the game was, however, attacked. The bus carrying the Ghanaian fans was consequently burned in the process. The Nigerian army had to disperse the crowd with tear gas. Due to the riot, FIFA awarded Ghana a 2–0 win for the tie.

=== 1992 African Cup of Nations (Financial incentive) ===
Before the game, Ghana had secured a spot in the semi-finals by defeating Congo - Brazzaville 2–1, while Nigeria had edged out Zaire (now Congo DRC) with a lone goal to reach the same stage of the tournament. The semi-final matchup was widely regarded as the "final before the final," featuring two of the tournament's favourites and longstanding West African rivals.

The match took place at the Stade de l'Amitié in Dakar on January 23, 1992, with a turnout of 30,000 fans. The Super Eagles took an early lead when Mutiu Adepoju, the former Real Sociedad player, found the back of the net in the 11th minute.

Abedi Pele, in the dying moments of the first half, equalised for Ghana with a header, ensuring that the Black Stars entered halftime on level terms.

Eight minutes into the second half, Prince Polley, the former Asante Kotoko S.C. forward, struck a first-time shot in the box to put Ghana ahead.

Although Ghana progressed to the final, they suffered defeat in a penalty shootout, with Ivory Coast emerging as the victors by an 11–10 score line. Abedi Pele of Ghana was recognised as the best player of the tournament, while Rashidi Yekini of Nigeria claimed the tournament's top scorer title. Abedi Pele concluded the competition with three goals, trailing just one goal behind the leading scorer, Rashidi Yekini.

The then captain Abedi Ayew Pele recalled how a financial incentive motivated them to triumph over their perennial rivals, the Super Eagles. He explained, "We were getting close but not US$10,000. I think we were promised US$5,000 and I said give us US$8,000, we can win the game. And the US$8,000 was given and the rest was history," It's worth noting that Abedi Pele, who was the captain of the Black Stars, was suspended for the final match after receiving a caution in the game against Nigeria.

=== 2002 African Cup of Nations (Shorunmu collapse) ===
The Super Eagles and the Black Stars faced off in the quarterfinal stage of the 2002 African Cup of Nations in Mali. Besides Garba Lawal securing a late victory for Nigeria, the newspapers were filled with headlines about Ike Shorunmu, who collapsed after a clash with a Ghanaian player.

Isaac Okoronkwo's errant pass nearly gave the Black Stars an opportunity to take the lead, but the goalkeeper fainted while attempting to rectify the situation following the collision. He was subsequently rushed to the hospital and revived with the assistance of oxygen.

In an interview with The PUNCH, Shorunmu emphasised that the intense rivalry between the two nations played a significant role in the incident. He noted that players were willing to go to great lengths, even risking their lives, while representing their respective countries and donning the national jersey.

=== 2002 FIFA World Cup qualification ===
On 10 March 2001, Ghana faced Nigeria in the 2002 FIFA World Cup qualifiers. This would be their fourth encounter against each other, with World Cup Finals qualification at stake. Former Black Stars winger, Charles Asampong Taylor, shared an encounter he had with former Super Eagles of Nigeria defender, Taribo West.

During that match, the Black Stars managed a goalless draw, but according to Taylor, he received threats from some of the Nigerian players who warned him to reduce his dribbling or risk leaving the field injured.

Ghana fielded an all Accra Hearts of Oak S.C. line-up with only Baffour Gyan (who came in later in the game as a substitute) as the foreign-based professional. Reflecting on the moment he donned the Black Stars jersey, Charles Taylor admitted to feeling overwhelmed when he saw star players like Jay-Jay Okocha and Nwankwo Kanu on the opposing team. He confessed that he was star-struck because these players represented renowned European clubs, and he had watched them on television. Taylor also mentioned that he confided in his teammate, Ishmael Addo about his apprehensions during the warm-up. During the game, Ghanaian fans resorted to tossing bags filled with water onto the playing field after sequence of decisions made by referee Felix Tangawarima that were viewed as questionable.

On July 29, 2001, during the return leg match, Nigeria secured their spot in the 2002 FIFA World Cup by defeating Ghana with a convincing score of 3–0. Victor Agali opened the scoring with a goal just two minutes into the game, and Tijani Babangida added two more goals in the first half.

The match took an interesting turn when Ghana's goalkeeper, Osei Boateng, was shown a red card, leaving Ghana with no available substitutions. This forced an outfield player, Emmanuel Osei Kuffour, to take on the role of goalkeeper for the remainder of the game.

This win ended Ghana's 17-year unbeaten run against Nigeria, and Nigeria subsequently became the eighth team to secure qualification for the 32-team tournament, while Ghana would have to wait four more years for a World Cup berth.

=== 2007 friendly at Brentford (Celebratory pitch invasions) ===
On 6 February 2007, both teams met in a friendly encounter at Griffin Park in Brentford. Prior to the game, Ghana had not beaten Nigeria in the last 15 years, after nine attempts. The kick-off for the match was delayed by 35 minutes to accommodate approximately 6,000 ticketholders and deal with numerous non-ticket-holders attempting to enter without permission. The security staff at the venue encountered challenges, including interactions with high-profile individuals like Nigerian sports ministers, ambassadors, FA officials, and even relatives of players. Despite the chaos, the Nigerian team managed to arrive just 10 minutes before the scheduled start of the game.

In the match, George Abbey received a warning from the referee for fouling Michael Essien early on. Essien also made a strong tackle in front of Nigerian fans, leading to “Ghana must go” chants referencing the historical xenophobic episode in the 1980s when Nigerians forced many Ghanaians to leave their country.

Nigeria lost the game 4–1. Players on the score sheet included Laryea Kingston, Sulley Muntari, Junior Agogo, and Joetex Asamoah Frimpong for Ghana and Taye Taiwo for Nigeria. Each Ghanaian goal was marked by a pitch invasion from the excited Ghanaian fans. In the VIP section, there was chaos as jubilant Ghanaian supporters tried to capture pictures of dejected Nigerian officials.

After the match, a stunned Super Eagles manager, Austin Eguavoen, remarked, "I've never seen an African team do that to Nigeria before. They stopped us from playing from the rear, and when we can't do that we get flustered. I have to congratulate Ghana; they were tactically and technically very, very strong." A frustrated Nigerian journalist pointed out that this was Nigeria's most significant defeat since their loss to Denmark by the same score in the 1998 World Cup, suggesting that perhaps the Super Eagles hadn't taken the match seriously. Eguavoen countered, saying, "We took this match very seriously. I had agreed with Mikel that I would only play him for 60 minutes but there was no way I was going to take him off with us 3-0 down, and I had planned not to use Yakubu at all, but I couldn't leave him on the bench with what was happening."

This result ended Nigeria's 15-year unbeaten run against Ghana.

=== 2008 Africa Cup of Nations (Celebration mockery) ===
During the 2008 African Cup, the Black Stars of Ghana faced off against the Nigerian Super Eagles in the quarterfinals. The 60th encounter between both teams began with intense energy as Sulley Muntari confronted Obinna Nwaneri following a late tackle within the first 15 seconds of the match. The Black Stars found themselves trailing by a goal after a penalty scored by Yakubu Ayigbeni in the 34th minute.

The game had been balanced until the 34th minute, when Yakubu Ayigbeni converted from the spot to give the Super Eagles an early lead. After scoring the goal, Nigeria celebrated by mocking Ghana's famous kangaroo celebration. Ghana equalised just before halftime when Michael Essien headed a cross from Quincy Owsu-Abeyie into the net.

John Mensah was sent off in the second half, reducing the Ghana squad to 10 players. An attack in the final quarter of the game led to Haminu Draman passing to Sulley Muntari, who set up Junior Agogo for the winning goal in the 82nd minute.

The game was ranked second among the best matches in African Cup of Nations history by OkayAfrica.

=== 2010 Africa Cup of Nations ===
During the 2010 African Cup of Nations, both teams would meet once more for the fourth consecutive time in the last four African Cup of Nations tournaments.

Among the 10,000-plus spectators in attendance were FIFA president Sepp Blatter and a contingent of Angolan soldiers. Ghana had the upper hand, having defeated Nigeria 2–1 in the quarterfinals of the 2008 Africa Cup of Nations on home soil.

Against the run of play, Ghana took the lead in the 21st minute. Kwadwo Asamoah delivered a corner from the left, and Asamoah Gyan outjumped his marker, Obinna Nwaneri, to head the ball past Vincent Enyeama. Gyan's goal marked his third of the tournament.

Ghana held on to their lead in the dying minutes, securing their place in the final while leaving Nigeria's title aspirations in ruins. Ghana made it to the Africa Cup of Nations final after an 18-year hiatus, and in disbelief, Gyan reflected on their achievement, stating, "It's unbelievable. We are a young team, and not many people believed we would make it to the final."

Ghana would go on to lose the final to Egypt by a lone goal, while Nigeria would finish in third place after defeating Algeria by the same goal margin.

=== 2022 FIFA World Cup qualification (Abuja riot) ===
The lead-up to the 2022 World Cup qualifiers match was marked by intriguing developments, mirroring the pattern of previous encounters between the two teams. The Ghana Football Association (GFA) opted to unveil their squad later than usual. In addition to that, Ghana encountered difficulties in securing a suitable venue for the first leg due to the unavailability of the Cape Coast Sports Stadium. Daniel Amokachi, the Super Eagles legend, in a video shared on social media following his visit to Abuja's Moshood Abiola National Stadium, where the second leg would take place, playfully remarked, "We're here at the Moshood Abiola National Stadium, fully prepared. Take a look at this magnificent pitch and stadium. We're ready, but some folks are still searching for a venue. Some are in a state of confusion; you know who I'm referring to." Nigeria's Sports Minister, Sunday Dare, said the Super Eagles will “beat the shit out of Ghana.”

However, GFA President Kurt Okraku seized the opportunity to respond during a goodwill message to the Black Stars and the entire Ghanaian community. According to him, "We have a common foe, the Super Eagles of Nigeria. They come across as our little babies, but they pretend to be the big boys." Shorunmu, who represented the Super Eagles from 1992 to 2002, was confident that Nigeria's attackers would prove too formidable for Ghana. Yakubu Ayegbeni added, "Just picture a scenario where Nigeria fails to qualify for the World Cup. In the case of Ghana missing out on the Qatar World Cup, it wouldn't be a significant issue."

Upon arrival at Kumasi Airport, the Nigerian team was met with a steep boarding ramp that inconvenienced the players and staff. This was considered unacceptable by Nigerian fans. Prior to the game in Ghana, a record sale of about 20,000 e-tickets was sold in less than 48 hours. After a delay in appearance, the Nigerian team was booed. The first game ended in a goalless draw in Kumasi.

In Nigeria, the Office of the Head of Service of the Federation directed all offices to close at 1p.m. on Tuesday (the day the game was to be played) in order to enable public servants to go to the Moshood Abiola Stadium to support the Super Eagles of Nigeria. Buses were provided as complimentary transportation for supporters coming from various parts of Abuja to the stadium, and there were approximately 24 specified locations for boarding. The Ghanaian team had their share of discomfort in Nigeria a day before the game. During their final hour-long training session on the field, the stadium's lights were unexpectedly switched off. It is reported that the Ghanaian team refused to leave the pitch after their allotted one-hour training, making it difficult for the groundsmen to prepare the pitch for the game the next day. The facility managers resorted to creating the power outage to force the Ghanaian team to leave the pitch.

The second leg in Abuja ended in a 1–1 draw, resulting in Ghana qualifying for the 2022 FIFA World Cup on away goal advantage. After the centre referee signalled the end of the match, Nigerian fans expressed their frustration by throwing bottled water and any available objects on the pitch. Some supporters ran onto the field, assaulting players and members of the technical teams from both sides. They damaged the Super Eagles' bench and equipment, leading to a surge of emotions within the stadium. This prompted the security personnel on duty to resort to tear gas to regain control and restore order. To ensure the safety of the Ghanaian supporters gathered at the stadium, they were escorted onto the pitch and guided through the players' tunnel to prevent any potential attacks on them. It took the Ghanaian supporters over two hours before they could board their buses to the Ghana High Commission in Abuja. A CAF official was reported to have died following the incident.

== Crossing the divide ==
=== Players who have played for both Ghana and Nigeria ===
- Abdul Ganiyu Salami

=== Nigerians who played for Ghana ===
- Amosa Gbadamosi
- Karim Abdul Razak
- Abdul Ganiyu Salami

=== Ghanaians who played for Nigeria ===
- Leotis Boateng
- John Orlando
