= List of international goals scored by Asamoah Gyan =

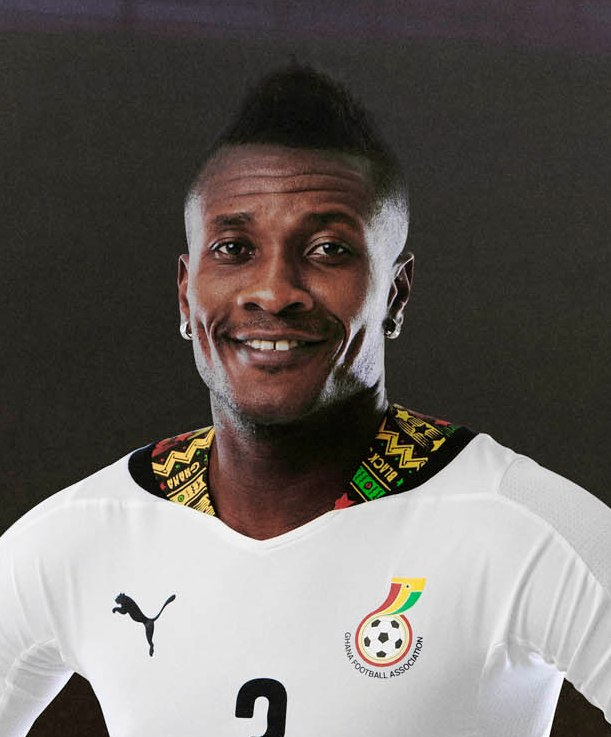
Asamoah Gyan Portrait (2014)

Asamoah Gyan is a Ghanaian former professional footballer who represented the Ghana national football team as a forward from 2003 to 2019. He made his debut appearance for Ghana on 16 November 2003, during a friendly against Somalia aged seventeen; three days before his eighteenth birthday. He scored on his debut in the 81st minute after coming on in the 77th minute for Nana Arhin Duah. He is currently the country's all-time top goalscorer with 51 goals in 109 appearances.

== International goals ==
Scores and results list Ghana's goal tally first.

List of international goals scored by Asamoah Gyan
No.	Date	Venue	Opponent	Score	Result	Competition	Ref.
1	16 November 2003	Ohene Djan Stadium, Accra, Ghana	Somalia	4–0	5–0	2006 FIFA World Cup qualification	
2	25 June 2004	Estádio da Machava, Maputo, Mozambique	Mozambique	1–0	1–0	Friendly	
3	3 July 2004	National Stadium, Kampala, Uganda	Uganda	1–1	1–1	2006 FIFA World Cup qualification	
4	23 March 2005	Moi International Sports Centre, Nairobi, Kenya	Kenya	1–0	2–2	Friendly	
5	27 March 2005	Stade des Martyrs, Kinshasa, DR Congo	DR Congo	1–0	1–1	2006 FIFA World Cup qualification	
6	8 October 2005	Estádio da Várzea, Praia, Cape Verde	Cape Verde	3–0	4–0	2006 FIFA World Cup qualification	
7	14 November 2005	King Fahd International Stadium, Riyadh, Saudi Arabia	Saudi Arabia	2–1	3–1	Friendly	
8	14 November 2005	King Fahd International Stadium, Riyadh, Saudi Arabia	Saudi Arabia	3–1	3–1	Friendly	
9	4 June 2006	Easter Road, Edinburgh, Scotland	South Korea	1–0	3–1	Friendly	
10	17 June 2006	RheinEnergieStadion, Cologne, Germany	Czech Republic	1–0	2–0	2006 FIFA World Cup	
11	8 October 2006	Seoul World Cup Stadium, Seoul, South Korea	South Korea	1–0	3–1	Friendly	
12	8 October 2006	Seoul World Cup Stadium, Seoul, South Korea	South Korea	3–1	3–1	Friendly	
13	21 August 2007	The Den, London, England	Senegal	1–0	1–1	Friendly	
14	20 January 2008	Accra Sports Stadium, Accra, Ghana	Guinea	1–0	2–1	2008 Africa Cup of Nations	
15	9 September 2009	Stadion Galgenwaard, Utrecht, Netherlands	Japan	1–0	3–4	Friendly	
16	9 September 2009	Stadion Galgenwaard, Utrecht, Netherlands	Japan	2–0	3–4	Friendly	
17	15 January 2010	Estádio Nacional do Chiazi, Cabinda, Angola	Ivory Coast	1–3	1–3	2010 Africa Cup of Nations	
18	24 January 2010	Estádio 11 de Novembro, Luanda, Angola	Angola	1–0	1–0	2010 Africa Cup of Nations	
19	28 January 2010	Estádio 11 de Novembro, Luanda, Angola	Nigeria	1–0	1–0	2010 Africa Cup of Nations	
20	1 June 2010	De Kuip, Rotterdam, Netherlands	Netherlands	1–2	1–4	Friendly	
21	13 June 2010	Loftus Versfeld Stadium, Pretoria, South Africa	Serbia	1–0	1–0	2010 FIFA World Cup	
22	19 June 2010	Royal Bafokeng Stadium, Rustenburg, South Africa	Australia	1–1	1–1	2010 FIFA World Cup	
23	26 June 2010	Royal Bafokeng Stadium, Rustenburg, South Africa	United States	2–1	2–1 (a.e.t.)	2010 FIFA World Cup	
24	29 March 2011	Wembley Stadium, London, England	England	1–1	1–1	Friendly	
25	7 June 2011	Jeonju World Cup Stadium, Jeonju, South Korea	South Korea	1–1	1–2	Friendly	
26	2 September 2011	Accra Sports Stadium, Accra, Ghana	Swaziland	1–0	2–0	2012 Africa Cup of Nations qualification	
27	8 October 2011	Al-Hilal Stadium, Khartoum, Sudan	Sudan	1–0	2–0	2012 Africa Cup of Nations qualification	
28	28 January 2012	Stade de Franceville, Franceville, Gabon	Mali	1–0	2–0	2012 Africa Cup of Nations	
29	10 January 2013	Sheikh Zayed Stadium, Abu Dhabi, United Arab Emirates	Egypt	3–0	3–0	Friendly	
30	13 January 2013	Sheikh Zayed Stadium, Abu Dhabi, United Arab Emirates	Tunisia	3–2	4–2	Friendly	
31	28 January 2013	Nelson Mandela Bay Stadium, Port Elizabeth, South Africa	Niger	1–0	3–0	2013 Africa Cup of Nations	
32	24 March 2013	Baba Yara Stadium, Kumasi, Ghana	Sudan	1–0	4–0	2014 FIFA World Cup qualification	
33	7 June 2013	Khartoum Stadium, Khartoum, Sudan	Sudan	1–0	3–1	2014 FIFA World Cup qualification	
34	7 June 2013	Khartoum Stadium, Khartoum, Sudan	Sudan	2–1	3–1	2014 FIFA World Cup qualification	
35	16 June 2013	Setsoto Stadium, Maseru, Lesotho	Lesotho	2–0	2–0	2014 FIFA World Cup qualification	
36	14 August 2013	Atatürk Olympic Stadium, Istanbul, Turkey	Turkey	1–2	2–2	Friendly	
37	14 August 2013	Atatürk Olympic Stadium, Istanbul, Turkey	Turkey	2–2	2–2	Friendly	
38	15 October 2013	Baba Yara Stadium, Kumasi, Ghana	Egypt	1–0	6–1	2014 FIFA World Cup qualification	
39	15 October 2013	Baba Yara Stadium, Kumasi, Ghana	Egypt	4–1	6–1	2014 FIFA World Cup qualification	
40	9 June 2014	Sun Life Stadium, Miami, United States	South Korea	2–0	4–0	Friendly	
41	21 June 2014	Castelão, Fortaleza, Brazil	Germany	2–1	2–2	2014 FIFA World Cup	
42	26 June 2014	Estádio Nacional Mané Garrincha, Brasília, Brazil	Portugal	1–1	1–2	2014 FIFA World Cup	
43	10 September 2014	Stade de Kégué, Lomé, Togo	Togo	1–1	3–2	2015 Africa Cup of Nations qualification	
44	11 October 2014	Stade Mohammed V, Casablanca, Morocco	Guinea	1–0	1–1	2015 Africa Cup of Nations qualification	
45	15 October 2014	Tamale Stadium, Tamale, Ghana	Guinea	1–0	3–1	2015 Africa Cup of Nations qualification	
46	23 January 2015	Estadio de Mongomo, Mongomo, Equatorial Guinea	Algeria	1–0	1–0	2015 Africa Cup of Nations	
47	14 June 2015	Accra Sports Stadium, Accra, Ghana	Mauritius	3–0	7–1	2017 Africa Cup of Nations qualification	
48	14 June 2015	Accra Sports Stadium, Accra, Ghana	Mauritius	4–0	7–1	2017 Africa Cup of Nations qualification	
49	21 January 2017	Stade de Port-Gentil, Port-Gentil, Gabon	Mali	1–0	1–0	2017 Africa Cup of Nations	
50	11 June 2017	Baba Yara Stadium, Kumasi, Ghana	Ethiopia	1–0	5–0	2019 Africa Cup of Nations qualification	
51	1 July 2017	Pratt & Whitney Stadium, East Hartford, United States	United States	1–2	1–2	Friendly	

== Statistics ==
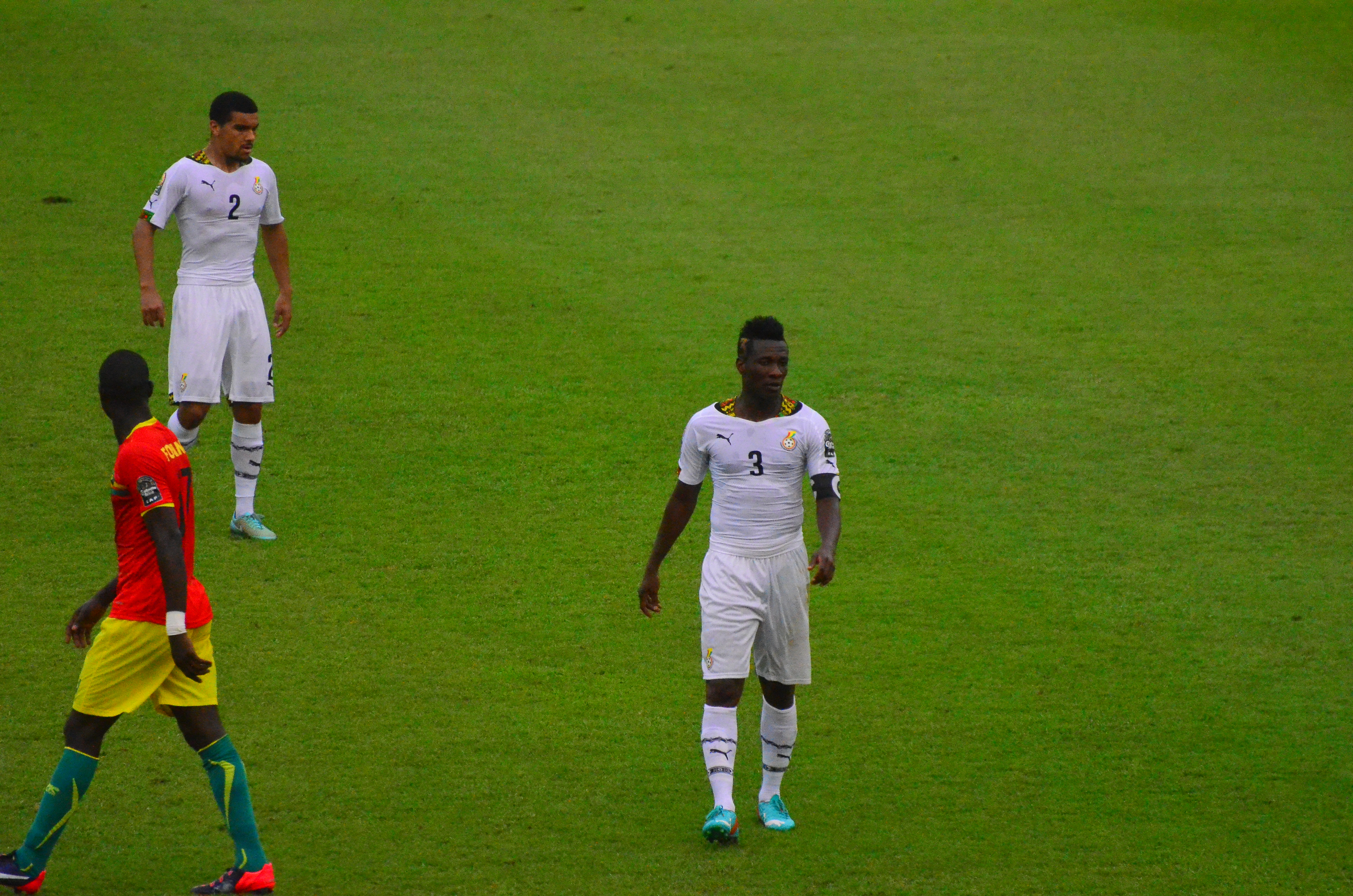
Gyan playing for Ghana in 2015

Appearances and goals by national team and year
National team	Year	Apps	Goals
Ghana	2003	2	1
Ghana	2004	3	2
Ghana	2005	5	5
Ghana	2006	9	4
Ghana	2007	4	1
Ghana	2008	4	1
Ghana	2009	5	2
Ghana	2010	17	7
Ghana	2011	5	4
Ghana	2012	8	1
Ghana	2013	15	11
Ghana	2014	9	6
Ghana	2015	8	3
Ghana	2016	2	0
Ghana	2017	9	3
Ghana	2019	4	0
Total		109	51

Goals by competition
Competition	Goals
FIFA World Cup qualification	10
FIFA World Cup	6
Africa Cup of Nations qualification	8
Africa Cup of Nations	8
Friendlies	19
Total	51
