= GFA TV =

Ghanaian television channel

Gfa TV
- Country: Ghana
- Broadcast area: Ghana

Programming
- Language(s): English

Ownership
- Owner: Ghana Football Association

History
- Launched: 2013

Links
- Website: twitter.com/ghanafatv

GTA TV is a Ghanaian television channel owned by the Ghana Football Association (GFA).

The channel was awarded a licence from the National Communications Authority of the Republic of Ghana and started broadcasting in August 2013. Its output concentrates on football, covering the Ghana Premier League, Ghana national football team, Ghanaian FA Cup, Ghana Football Leagues and semi-professional football in the country.

== Programs ==
- Ghana national football team (Live Matches & Highlights)
- Ghana Premier League (Live Matches & Highlights)
- Ghanaian FA Cup (Live Matches & Highlights)
- Ghana Football Leagues (Live Matches & Highlights)
