= BBC African Sports Personality of the Year =

- Presented by: BBC World Service
- Formerly called: BBC African Sports Personality of the Year; BBC African Footballer of the Year
- First award: 1992
- Final award: 2021
- Most recent winner: Christine Mboma

Television/radio coverage
- Network: BBC

The BBC African Sports Personality of the Year (previously known as the BBC African Sports Star of the Year and the BBC African Footballer of the Year) was an annual award given to the best African sports personality of the year as voted by the BBC radio listeners. Voting was done via SMS and online.

== History ==
Initially a sports award, the inaugural winner was Ghana's Abedi Pele in 1992. The only non-footballers to win the award was track and field athlete Frankie Fredericks in 1993, and long-distance track and road running athlete Haile Gebrselassie from Ethiopia, in 1998. The Zambia national football team were posthumous winners of the award in 1994, following the plane crash in the Atlantic Ocean a year previous. The award became centred around football from 2001 onwards, Cameroon's Patrick Mboma was the last person to win it as a sports award.

Nigeria's Nwankwo Kanu and Jay-Jay Okocha, as well as the Ivory Coast's Yaya Touré and Egypt's Mohamed Salah are the only players to win the award more than once, with two wins.

In 2019, the award was changed back to its initial concept and renamed as the BBC African Sports Personality of the Year to reflect the balance between gender, disability and variety of sports on offer. However there were no awards in 2019 and in 2020 due to the COVID-19 pandemic. In 2022, after it was returned back to the sports award, Christine Mboma became the first person to win the award for 2021 season.

The award was discontinued after 2022.

== Winners ==
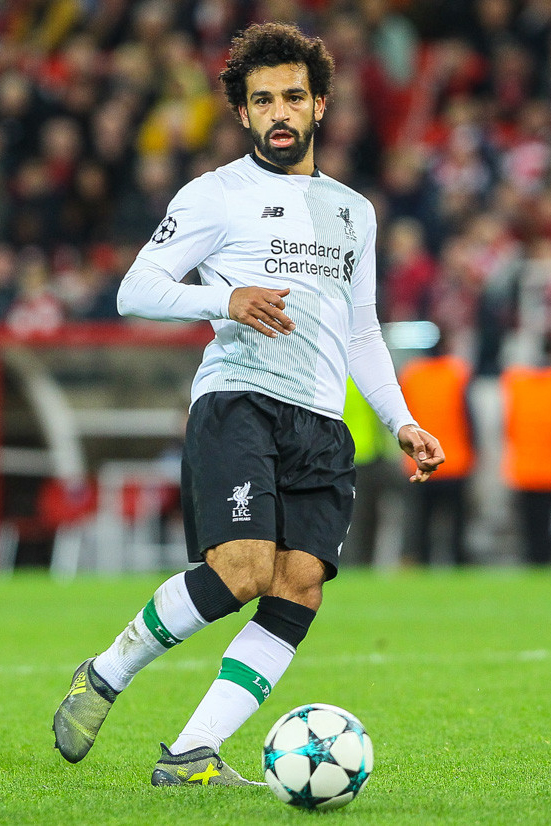
Mohamed Salah was named BBC African Sports Personality of the Year in 2017 and 2018

Year	Winner	Football club(s)	Ref.
1992	(Ghana) Abedi Pele	(France) Marseille	
1993	(Namibia) Frankie Fredericks	—N/a	
1994	Zambia national football team	—N/a	
1995	(Liberia) George Weah	(Italy) Milan	
1996	(Nigeria) Emmanuel Amuneke	(Portugal) Sporting CP (Spain) Barcelona	
1997	(Nigeria) Nwankwo Kanu	(Italy) Internazionale	
1998	(Ethiopia) Haile Gebrselassie	—N/a	
1999	(Nigeria) Nwankwo Kanu (2)	(England) Arsenal	
2000	(Cameroon) Patrick Mboma	(Italy) Cagliari (Italy) Parma	
2001	(Ghana) Samuel Kuffour	(Germany) Bayern Munich	
2002	(Senegal) El Hadji Diouf	(France) Lens (England) Liverpool	
2003	(Nigeria) Jay-Jay Okocha	(England) Bolton Wanderers	
2004	(Nigeria) Jay-Jay Okocha (2)	(England) Bolton Wanderers	
2005	(Egypt) Mohamed Barakat	(Egypt) Al Ahly	
2006	(Ghana) Michael Essien	(England) Chelsea	
2007	(Togo) Emmanuel Adebayor	(England) Arsenal	
2008	(Egypt) Mohamed Aboutrika	(Egypt) Al Ahly	
2009	(Ivory Coast) Didier Drogba	(England) Chelsea	
2010	(Ghana) Asamoah Gyan	(England) Sunderland	
2011	(Ghana) André Ayew	(France) Marseille	
2012	(Zambia) Christopher Katongo	(China) Henan Construction	
2013	(Ivory Coast) Yaya Touré	(England) Manchester City	
2014	(Algeria) Yacine Brahimi	(Spain) Granada (Portugal) Porto	
2015	(Ivory Coast) Yaya Touré (2)	(England) Manchester City	
2016	(Algeria) Riyad Mahrez	(England) Leicester City	
2017	(Egypt) Mohamed Salah	(Italy) Roma (England) Liverpool	
2018	(Egypt) Mohamed Salah (2)	(England) Liverpool	
2021	(Namibia) Christine Mboma	—N/a	

=== Wins by country ===
Nation	Winners
Nigeria	5
Ghana	5
Egypt	4
Ivory Coast	3
Zambia	2
Algeria	2
Namibia	2
Liberia	1
Cameroon	1
Ethiopia	1
Senegal	1
Togo	1

=== Wins by club ===
Club	Winners
(England) Liverpool	3
(France) Marseille	2
(England) Chelsea	2
(Egypt) Al Ahly	2
(England) Manchester City	2
(England) Arsenal	2
(England) Bolton Wanderers	2
(Germany) Bayern Munich	1
(Italy) Internazionale	1
(Spain) Barcelona	1
(Italy) Cagliari	1
(England) Leicester City	1
(Italy) Milan	1
(Spain) Granada	1
(China) Henan Construction	1
(Portugal) Sporting CP	1
(England) Sunderland	1
(Portugal) Porto	1
(Italy) Roma	1
(France) Lens	1
(Italy) Parma	1

== See also ==
- African Footballer of the Year
