= Ghana national football team =

Ghana
- Nickname: Black Stars
- Association: GFA
- Confederation: CAF (Africa)
- Sub-confederation: WAFU (West Africa)
- Head coach: Kim Björkegren (caretaker)
- Captain: Jordan Ayew
- Most caps: Jordan Ayew (124)
- Top scorer: Asamoah Gyan (51)
- Home stadium: Various
- FIFA code: GHA
First colours	Second colours

FIFA ranking
- Current: 69 ▲1 (18 November 2026)
- Highest: 14 (April–May 2007, February 2008)
- Lowest: 89 (June 2004)

First international
- Gold Coast and (United Kingdom) British Togoland 1–0 Nigeria (Accra, British Gold Coast; 28 May 1950)

Biggest win
- Nyasaland 0–12 Gold Coast (Nyasaland; 15 October 1962)

Biggest defeat
- Bulgaria 10–0 Ghana (Leon, Mexico; 2 October 1968)

World Cup
- Appearances: 5 (first in 2006)
- Best result: Quarter-finals (2010)

Africa Cup of Nations
- Appearances: 24 (first in 1963)
- Best result: Champions (1963, 1965, 1978, 1982)

West African Nations Cup / WAFU Nations Cup
- Appearances: 8 (first in 1982)
- Best result: Champions (1982, 1983, 1984, 1986, 1987, 2013, 2017)

The Ghana national football team represents Ghana in men's international association football. It is nicknamed the Black Stars after the Black Star of Africa in the flag of Ghana. The team is governed by the Ghana Football Association. Prior to 1957, it played as the Gold Coast.

Ghana qualified for the FIFA World Cup for the first time in 2006. It has won the Africa Cup of Nations four times (1963, 1965, 1978, and 1982), while finishing as runners-up five times (1968, 1970, 1992, 2010, and 2015). Ghana have qualified for the CHAN four times, finishing as runners-up twice (2009 and 2014).

== History ==
On 19 August 1962 at the Accra Sports Stadium, Ghana hosted Real Madrid, who were at the time Spanish champions, drawing 3–3.

Charles Kumi Gyamfi became coach in 1961, leading Ghana to successive African Cup of Nations titles, in 1963 and 1965. The Black Stars achieved their record win, 13–2 away to Kenya, in the latter. It reached the final of the tournament in 1968 and 1970, losing 1–0 on both occasions, to DR Congo and Sudan respectively. Its domination of the tournament earned it the nickname "the Black Stars of Africa" in the 1960s.

Fortunes changed for the Black Stars after it failed to qualify for three successive AFCON's in the 1970s. In the 1980s, with emerging talents such as Abedi Pele, the Black Stars defeated 1982 AFCON hosts Libya in the final to win its fourth continental title. Fortunes changed again, as in the 1984 tournament, it was knocked out in the group stages, before failing to qualify for the 1986, 1988 and 1990 tournaments. In 1992, the Black Stars would finish runners-up to the Ivory Coast in a penalty shootout after a goalless draw, which saw every player on the pitch take a penalty, in which they were beaten 11-10, with African Footballer of the Year Abedi Pele suspended for the final.

Tensions among the squad led to the parliamentary and executive to intervene and settle issues between players Abedi Pele and Tony Yeboah. In the 1990s, this may have played some part in the failure of the team to build on the successes of the national underage teams. The generation of Black Stars players who went to the 2001 FIFA World Youth Championship final became the "core" of the team at the 2002 African Cup of Nations, going undefeated for a year in 2005 and qualifying for the final tournament of the 2006 FIFA World Cup. The Black Stars started by succumbing to a 2–0 defeat to eventual champions Italy, and wins over Czech Republic (2–0) and the United States (2–1). This saw it advance through to the second round, where it lost 3–0 to Brazil.

Under head coach Milovan Rajevac, the Black Stars went on to secure a 100% win record in its qualification campaign, winning its group and becoming the first African team to qualify for the 2010 FIFA World Cup. In the final tournament, it was placed in Group D with Germany, Serbia and Australia, advancing to the round of 16 after finishing second in their group. Ghana played the United States, winning 2–1 in extra time to become only the third African nation to reach the World Cup quarter-finals, before losing to Uruguay in a penalty shootout in the quarter-finals, after Uruguayan forward Luis Suárez blocked a header with his hand in the penalty box in extra time and was sent off. Asamoah Gyan missed the penalty given for the handball, with the score 1–1. Ghana went on to lose the penalty shootout 4–2.

In 2013, Ghana became the first team to reach four consecutive African Cup of Nations semi-finals twice, with the first occasion between 1963 and 1970.

The Black Stars won their second round group of 2014 FIFA World Cup qualifying, and defeated Egypt 7–3 on aggregate in a two-legged play-off, qualifying for the finals. It was drawn in Group G for the finals, where it faced Germany, Portugal, and the United States. It exited in the group stage recording one draw against eventual champions Germany and two losses, and was the only team to not lose to Germany in the tournament, and the only team to hold onto a lead against the Germans at any point.

In the 2015 Africa Cup of Nations, Ghana reached the final, being denied the title on penalties against Ivory Coast. While its 2017 Africa Cup of Nations campaign ended in a 4th-place finish, it finished behind Egypt and Uganda in its final group qualifiers for the 2018 FIFA World Cup. At the 2019 Africa Cup of Nations, Ghana was eliminated by Tunisia in the round of 16. In 2021, manager Rajevac was brought back, and the Black Stars ended up failing to win a match at the AFCON where it lost 2–3 to debutants the Comoros after an André Ayew red card to finish bottom of their group, failing to progress beyond the group stage for the first time since 2006. Ghana drew 0–0 in a match against Nigeria and drew 1–1 in Nigeria to qualify for the 2022 FIFA World Cup on away goals. During the 2022 FIFA World Cup, it lost its first match against Portugal 3–2. Ghana earned a victory in its second match against South Korea by the same scoreline. A victory against Uruguay was required for a spot in the round of 16 in a rematch of the 2010 quarter-final; Ghana instead lost 2–0 and thus finished bottom, while Uruguay was eliminated as well, as a result of South Korea upsetting Portugal.

Ghana failed to qualify for the 2025 Africa Cup of Nations, for the first time since 2004, as it finished bottom of the group below Angola, Sudan, and Niger.

== Culture ==
=== Kits and crest ===
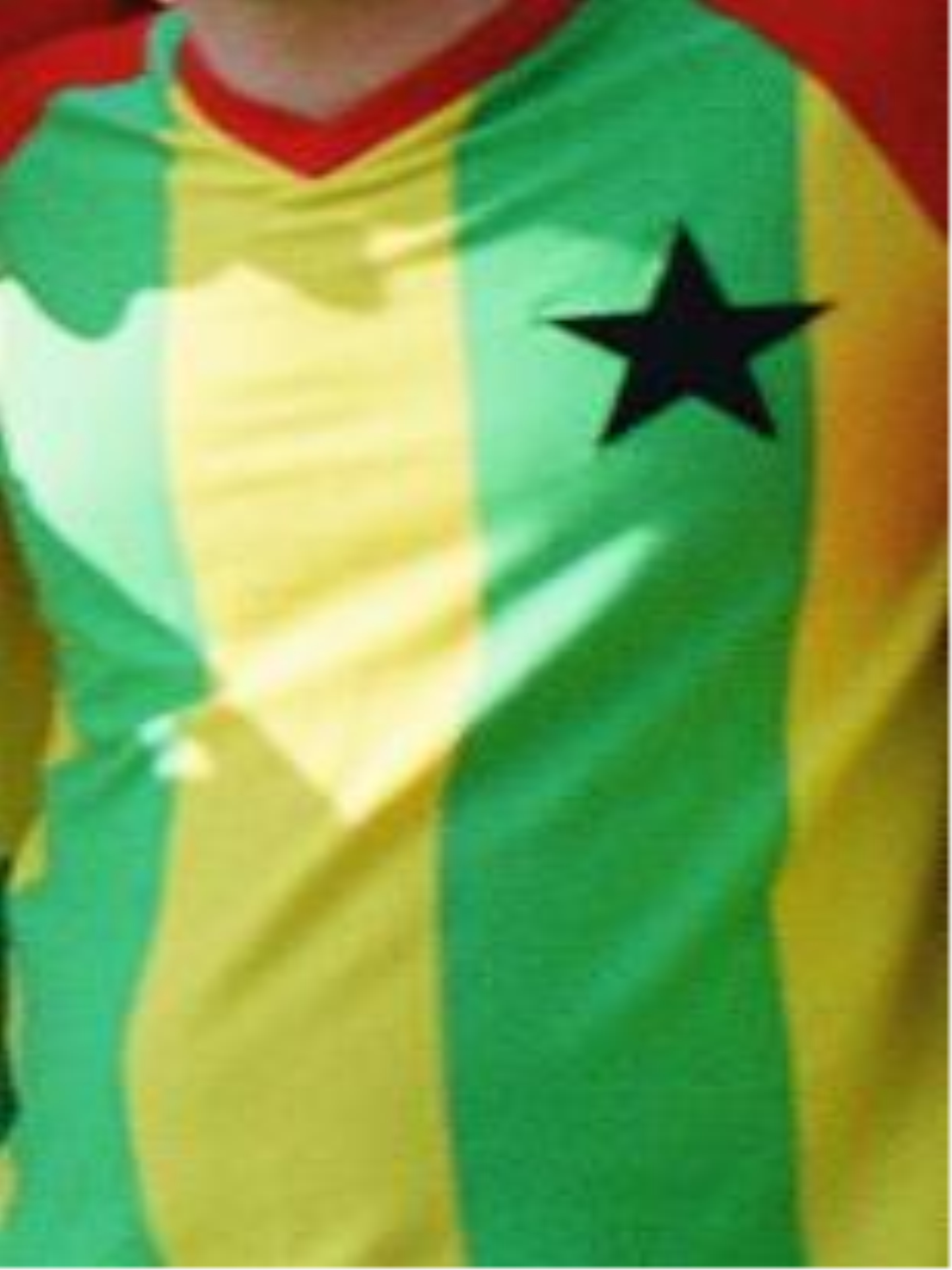
Home shirt: 1970s–1980s

The official jersey colours for the Black Stars are white for home games and yellow for away games.

Adopted following the independence of Ghana in 1957, the black star has been included in the Black Stars' kits. The Black Stars kits were sponsored by Puma SE from 2005, with the deal ending in 2014.

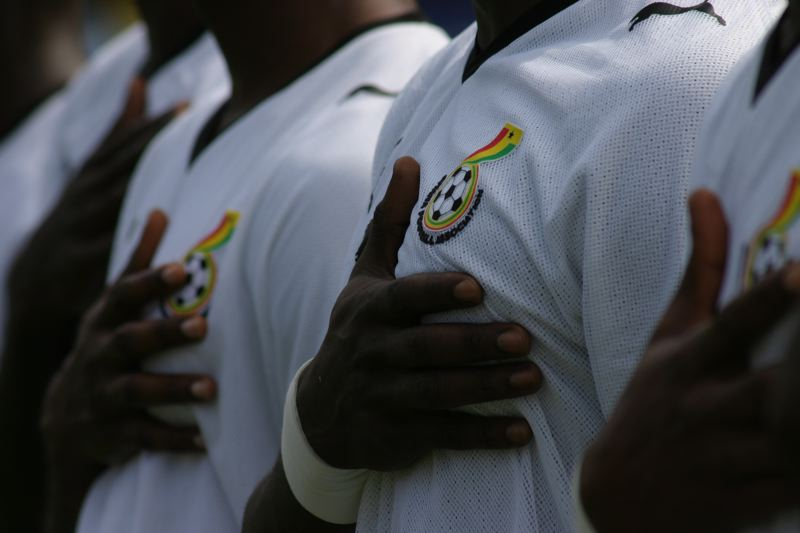
Badge and anthem

Between 1990 and 2006, Ghana used the kit in the colours of the national flag of Ghana, with gold, green and red used, as in the team's crest and also known as the Pan-African colours. The gold with green and red kit concept and design was used in the 60s and 70s, and designed with gold and green vertical stripes and red shoulders. An all black second kit was introduced in 2008 and in 2015, Black Stars' gold-red-green coloured kit and all black coloured kit is to be reassigned to the position of 1st and 2nd kits following the induction of a brown with blue and gold coloured Black Stars 3rd kit in 2012.

The team's kit for the 2014 FIFA World Cup was ranked as the best kit of the tournament by BuzzFeed.

2008 Africa Cup of Nations 1st and 2nd kits

Kit supplier	Period
(Germany) Erima	1991–1992
(Germany) Adidas	1992–2000
(Italy) Kappa	2000–2005
(Germany) Puma	2005–present

=== Grounds ===
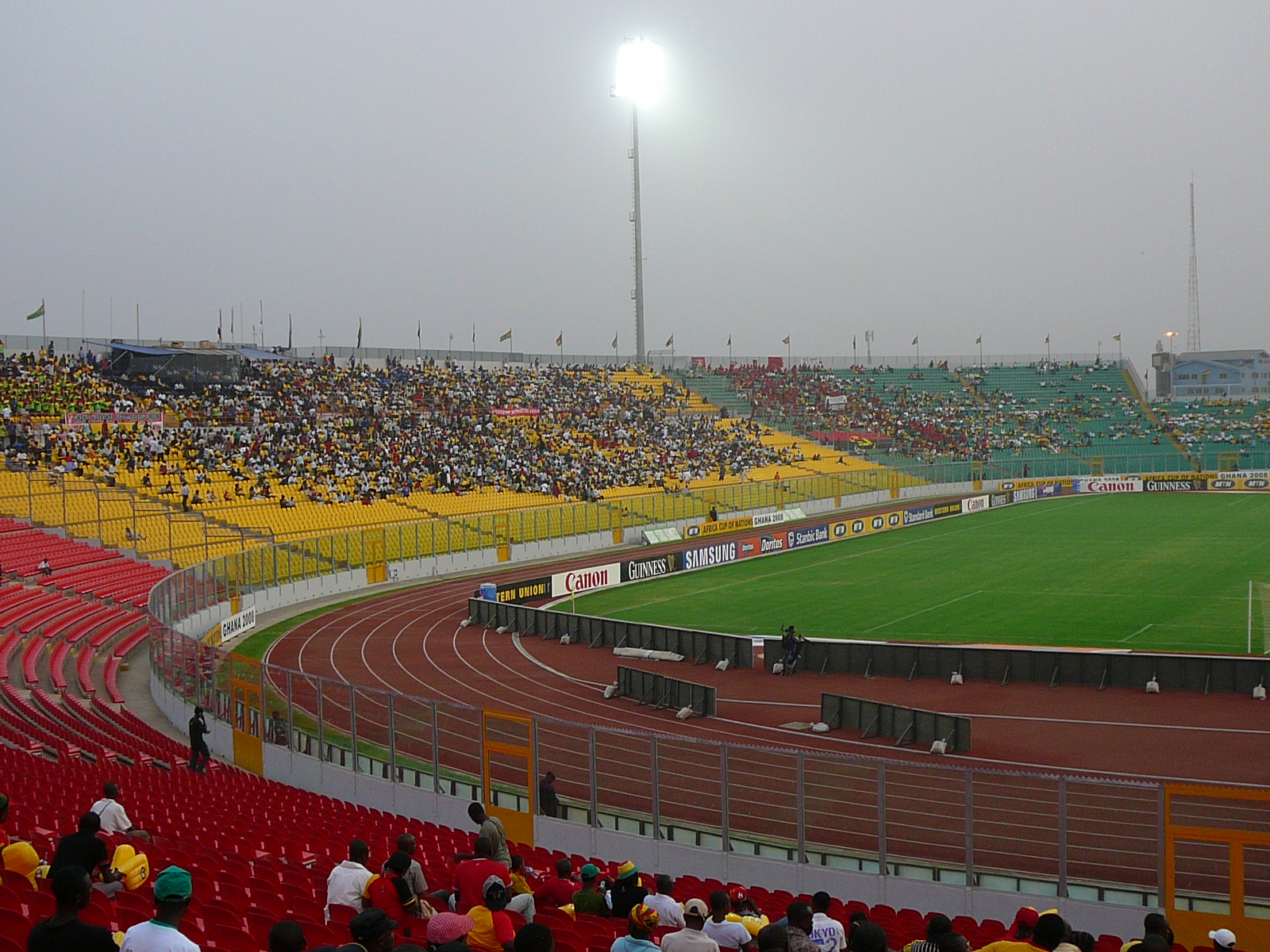
Kumasi Sports Stadium

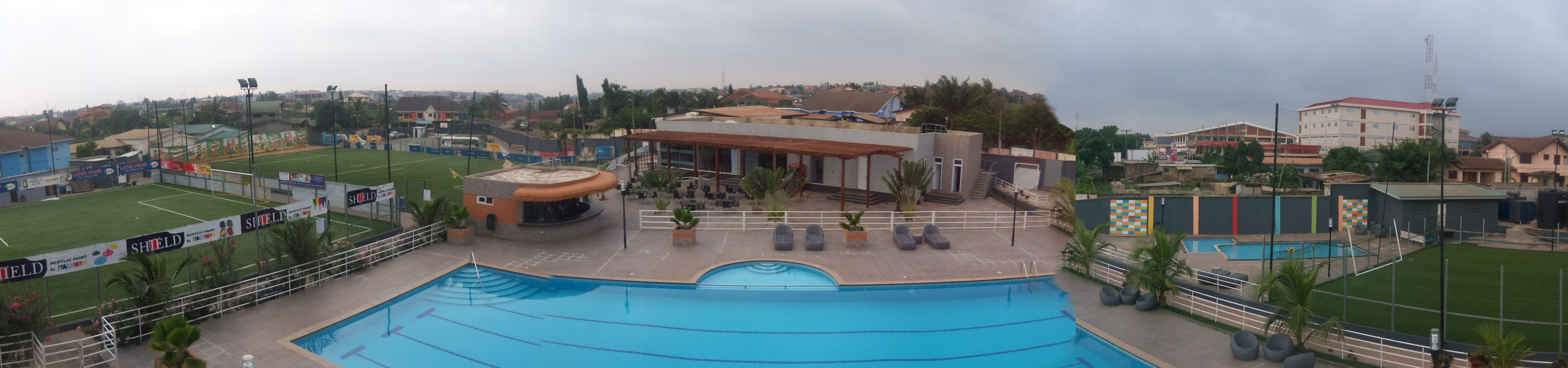
Lizzy Sports Complex

The training facilities and training grounds are located at Agyeman Badu Stadium, Berekum Sports Stadium in Brong-Ahafo, the Tema Sports Stadium in Tema and the multi-functional Lizzy Sports Complex in Legon.

=== Organisation and finance ===
The Black Stars had no official head because of "corrupt" practices by the then president, Kwesi Nyantakyi and vice-president George Afriyie, with Frank Davis as director of football, and Edward Bawa as treasurer. The Ghana Football Association (GFA) signed a CN¥92.2 million (US$15 million) deal with Ghanaian state-run oil and gas exploration corporation, Ghana National Petroleum Corporation (GNPC), to sponsor the Black Stars and the renewable contract saw the oil and gas exploration corporation become the global headline sponsor of the Black Stars, with a yearly Black Stars player salary wage bill, following the gold mining corporations Ashanti Goldfields Corporation and Goldfields Ghana Limited (GGL), which had been sponsoring the Black Stars since 2005.

On 28 August 2013, the GFA launched a TV channel and named GFA TV. The channel has the exclusive rights to broadcast all the Black Stars' matches. In November 2013, the Black Stars signed a 2013–2015 CN¥30.6 million (US$5 million) and an additional classified multi-million private bank sponsorship deal with the Ghanaian state-run private banking institution UniBank.

=== Supporters ===
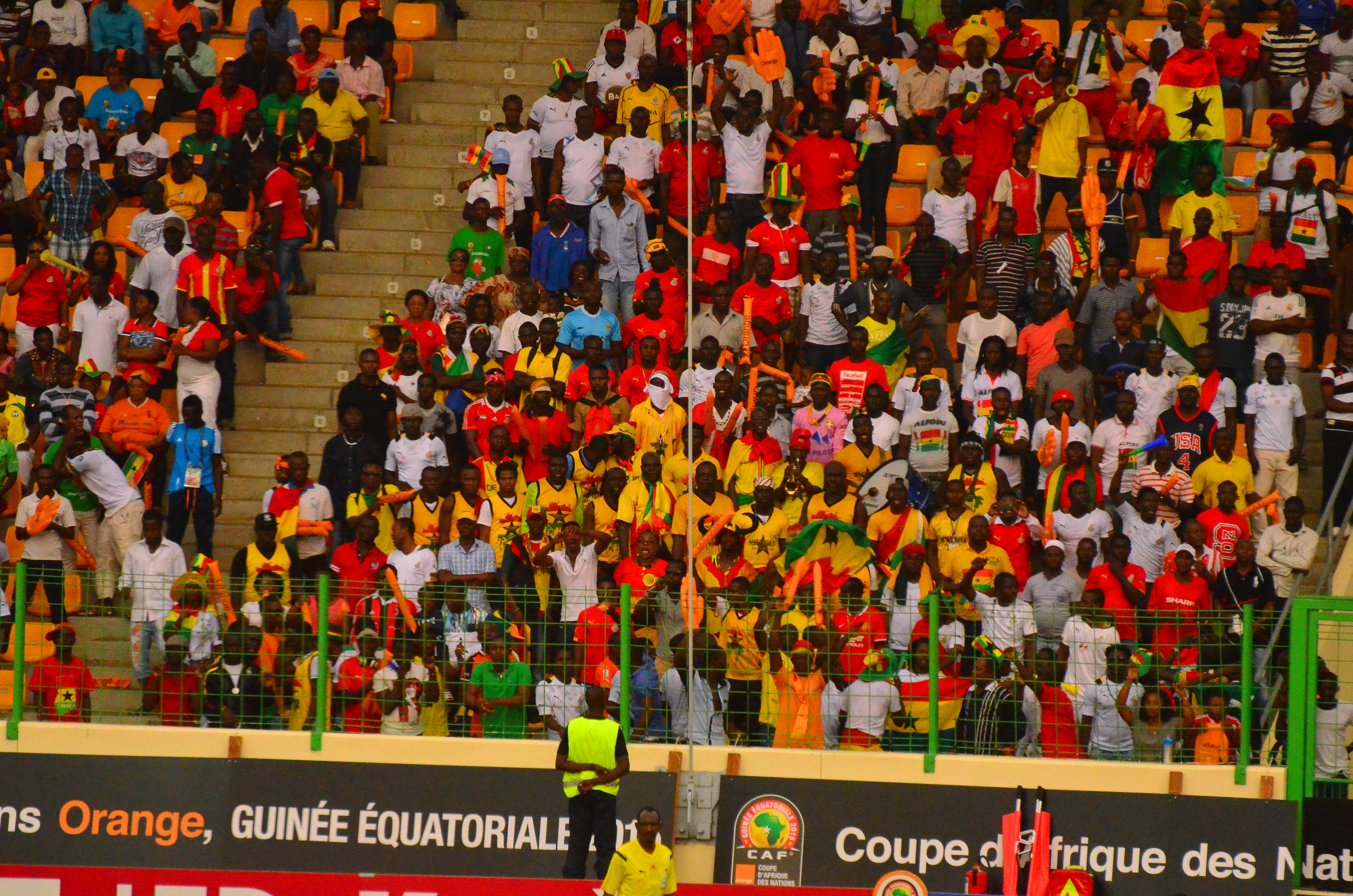
Ghanaian supporters at the 2015 AFCON match between Ghana and Guinea

The Black Stars maintain an average stadium match attendance of over 60,000, with 84,017 watching the 2010 FIFA World Cup quarter-final against Uruguay. Its match against England on 29 March 2011 had the largest away following for any association football national team since the re-opening of Wembley Stadium in 2007. The match was watched by 700 million people around the world.

Following the team's appearances at the 2006 and 2010 World Cup tournaments, Ghana were greeted by some hundred fans dancing and singing at Accra International Airport in Accra.

=== Rivalries ===
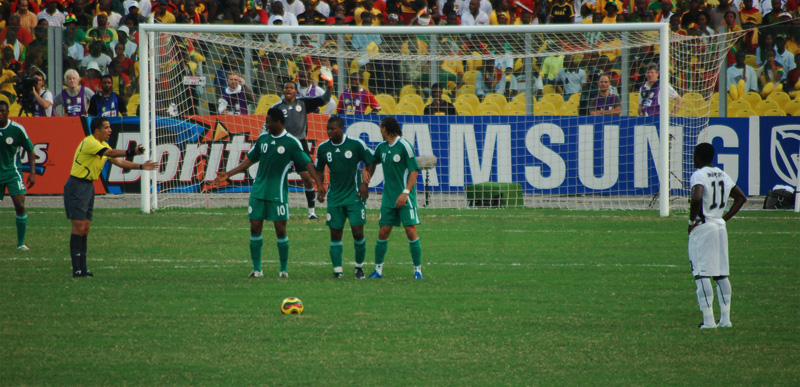
Ghana against Nigeria in the 2008 Africa Cup of Nations quarter-final

Ghana is rivals with Nigeria. The "Battle of Supremacy on the Gulf of Guinea" is between two of the "most successful teams on the African continent". The proximity of the two countries to each other, a dispute between the different association football competitions and wider diplomatic competition for influence across West Africa add to this rivalry. The match between these two countries is called the Jollof derby.

=== Media and arts ===
Match schedules are broadcast in English as in the case of inter-continental matches and in Akan nationally by Adom TV, PeaceFM, AdomFM and HappyFM. During the scheduled qualification for the 2014 World Cup national broadcaster GTV, a sub-division of the Ghana Broadcasting Corporation (GBC), broadcast to the Ghanaian public home qualifiers with away qualifiers broadcast by the satellite television broadcasting corporation Viasat 1. The friendly match against Turkey in August 2013 was televised by Viasat 1 and the qualifiers for the 2015 Africa Cup of Nations and the 2018 Inter-Continental Championships are scheduled for public broadcast by the corporations GFA TV, GBC and Viasat 1.

Products including books, documentary films, Azonto dances and songs have been made in the name of the team. These may be intended with commercial motives and are focused on previous and future World Cups or Africa Cup of Nations tournaments.

- Books: books have been published on the team's history and participation in tournaments. These include Ghana, The Rediscovered Soccer Might: Watch Out World!, about the history and performance of the Black Stars and association football national teams that the Black Stars have played against, and The Black Stars of Ghana by Alan Whelan; about Black Stars commencing their progress through the final rounds of the 2010 World Cup and into the quarter-finals.
- Documentary films: In 2010 Miracle Films Ghana Limited showcased a vintage documentary film picture, Kwame Nkrumah & Ghana's Black Stars, about Osagyefo Kwame Nkrumah "Africa's man of the 2nd millennium" and "Pan-African pioneer", who invested energy into making Ghana's association football national team – the Black Stars – a force in African soccer.
- Nickname: The Black Star Line, a shipping industry line incorporated by the founder of the Back-to-Africa movement, civil rights movement leader Marcus Garvey and the organiser of the Universal Negro Improvement Association and African Communities League (UNIA) from 1919 to 1922, gives the Ghana team its nicknames, the Black Stars of West Africa and the Black Stars of Africa.
- Dances: upon the Black Stars scoring against opposition teams, dance forms of the Ghanaian Azonto were performed by Black Stars players in their goal celebrations in match victories at the 2010 World Cup and in 2013, an elite dance version of the Ghanaian Azonto named; "(Akan: Mmonko)" (shrimp), was established and showcased at the 2013 Africa Cup of Nations by the Black Stars players. Black Stars goal celebrations in match victories at the 2014 World Cup and upon scoring against opposition teams, are to establish and showcase Alkayida.
- Songs: On occasions of past World Cups or African Championships, a number of musicians with music producers created hiplife football songs which were composed in the Akan language – the 2006 World Cup song, "Akan: Tuntum Nsorom Ye Ko Yen Anim", (Black Stars, We are moving forward) musical composed by the Musicians Union of Ghana, is to motivate the Black Stars to perform creditably in its quest for the capturing of the World Cup trophy. Black Stars' captain and top-goalscorer Asamoah Gyan recorded and released a Hiplife song with 'Castro The Destroyer', where he features under the alias 'Baby Jet'. The song is entitled "African Girls" and is sung in the Akan language and was launched onto the Ghanaian screens, continental West Africa screens and onto the Sub-Saharan Africa screens. The music video shows the "Asamoah Gyan Dance" goal celebration which he demonstrated at the 2010 World Cup. The song "African Girls" won an award at the Ghana Music Awards in 2011. The 2010 World Cup song, "Ghana Black Stars (Official Song 2010 World Cup)" composed by Ghanaian hiplife music group "Kings and Queens Entertainment" approved by the Ghana Football Association (GFA) as GFA has indicated that the Black Stars are a protected brand. Award-winning Ghanaian musician, Kofi Kinaata composed a song he has titled "Black Stars" ahead of the 2026 FIFA World Cup".

== Results and fixtures ==
The following is a list of match results in the last 12 months, and future matches that have been scheduled.

Win Draw Loss Fixture

=== 2025 ===
14 November 2025 Kirin Challenge Cup	Japan	2–0	Ghana	Toyota, Japan
19:20 UTC+9	Minamino 16'; Doan 60'	Report		Stadium: Toyota Stadium; Attendance: 40,030; Referee: Ben Abraham (Australia)

18 November Friendly	South Korea	1–0	Ghana	Seoul, South Korea
20:00 UTC+9	Lee Tae-seok 63'	Report		Stadium: Seoul World Cup Stadium; Attendance: 33,256; Referee: Ahmad Al-Ali (Kuwait)

=== 2026 ===
27 March Friendly	Austria	5–1	Ghana	Vienna, Austria
19:00 UTC+1	Sabitzer 12' (pen.); Gregoritsch 51'; Posch 59'; Chukwumeka 79'; Seiwald 90+2'	Report	J. Ayew 77'	Stadium: Ernst-Happel-Stadion; Attendance: 40,200; Referee: Mohammed Al Hoish (Saudi Arabia)

30 March Friendly	Germany	2–1	Ghana	Stuttgart, Germany
20:45 UTC+2	Havertz 45+3' (pen.); Undav 88'	Report	Fatawu 70'	Stadium: MHPArena; Attendance: 54,000; Referee: Stuart Attwell (England)

22 May Friendly	Mexico	2–0	Ghana	Puebla, Mexico
20:00 UTC−6	Gutiérrez 2'; Martínez 54'	Report		Stadium: Estadio Cuauhtémoc; Referee: Selvin Brown (Honduras)

2 June Friendly	Wales	1–1	Ghana	Cardiff, Wales
19:45 UTC+0	Koumas 90+3'	Report	Yirenkyi 66'	Stadium: Cardiff City Stadium; Referee: Oscar Johnson (Sweden)

17 June 2026 World Cup GS	Ghana	1–0	Panama	Toronto, Canada
19:00 UTC−4	Yirenkyi 90+5'	Report		Stadium: BMO Field; Attendance: 42,942; Referee: Glenn Nyberg (Sweden)

23 June 2026 World Cup GS	England	0–0	Ghana	Foxborough, United States
16:00 UTC−4		Report		Stadium: Gillette Stadium; Attendance: 63,983; Referee: Saíd Martínez (Honduras)

27 June 2026 World Cup GS	Croatia	2–1	Ghana	Philadelphia, United States
17:00 UTC−4	P. Sučić 31'; Vlašić 83'	Report	Luckassen 73'	Stadium: Lincoln Financial Field; Attendance: 68,324; Referee: Drew Fischer (Canada)

3 July 2026 World Cup R32	Colombia	1–0	Ghana	Kansas City, United States
20:30 UTC−5	J. Arias 14'	Report		Stadium: Arrowhead Stadium; Attendance: 69,045; Referee: Clément Turpin (France)

24 September 2027 AFCON qualification	Ivory Coast	2–0	Ghana	Bouaké, Ivory Coast
19:00 UTC+0	Yalcouyé 44'; Kessié 58' (pen.)	Report		Stadium: Bouaké Stadium; Referee: Mustapha Ghorbal (Algeria)

29 September 2027 AFCON qualification	Ghana	2–4	Gambia	Accra, Ghana
16:00 UTC+0	Nuamah 27' (pen.); Afena-Gyan 33'	Report	Badamosi 37' (pen.); O. Colley 42'; E. Colley 68', 90+1'	Stadium: Accra Sports Stadium; Referee: Mustapha Kechchaf (Morocco)

4 October Friendly	Morocco	Cancelled	Ghana	Tangier, Morocco
19:00 UTC+0		Report		Stadium: Grand Stade de Tanger
Note: Fixture cancelled on 1 October following consultation between both teams National Federations.

12 November 2027 AFCON qualification	Ghana	2–0	Somalia	Essipong, Ghana
15:00 UTC+0	Adjetey 45+2'; Afena-Gyan 62'	Report		Stadium: Sekondi-Takoradi Stadium; Referee: André Kolissala (Central African Republic)

16 November 2027 AFCON qualification	Somalia	0–1	Ghana	Essipong, Ghana
15:00 UTC+0		Report	J. Ayew 36' (pen.)	Stadium: Sekondi-Takoradi Stadium; Referee: Mweshitsama Naftal (Namibia)

=== 2027 ===
24 March 2027 AFCON qualification	Ghana	v	Ivory Coast	Ghana
--:-- UTC+0				Stadium: TBC

28 March 2027 AFCON qualification	Gambia	v	Ghana	Gambia
--:-- UTC+0				Stadium: TBC

== Coaches ==
As of 12 November 2026

Position	Name
Head coach	(Sweden) Kim Björkegren (caretaker)
Assistant coach	(South Africa) Roger De Sá
Assistant coach	(Ghana) John Paintsil
Goalkeeping coach	(United States) (Portugal) Daniel Gaspar
Assistant goalkeeping coach	(Ghana) Fatau Dauda

=== History ===
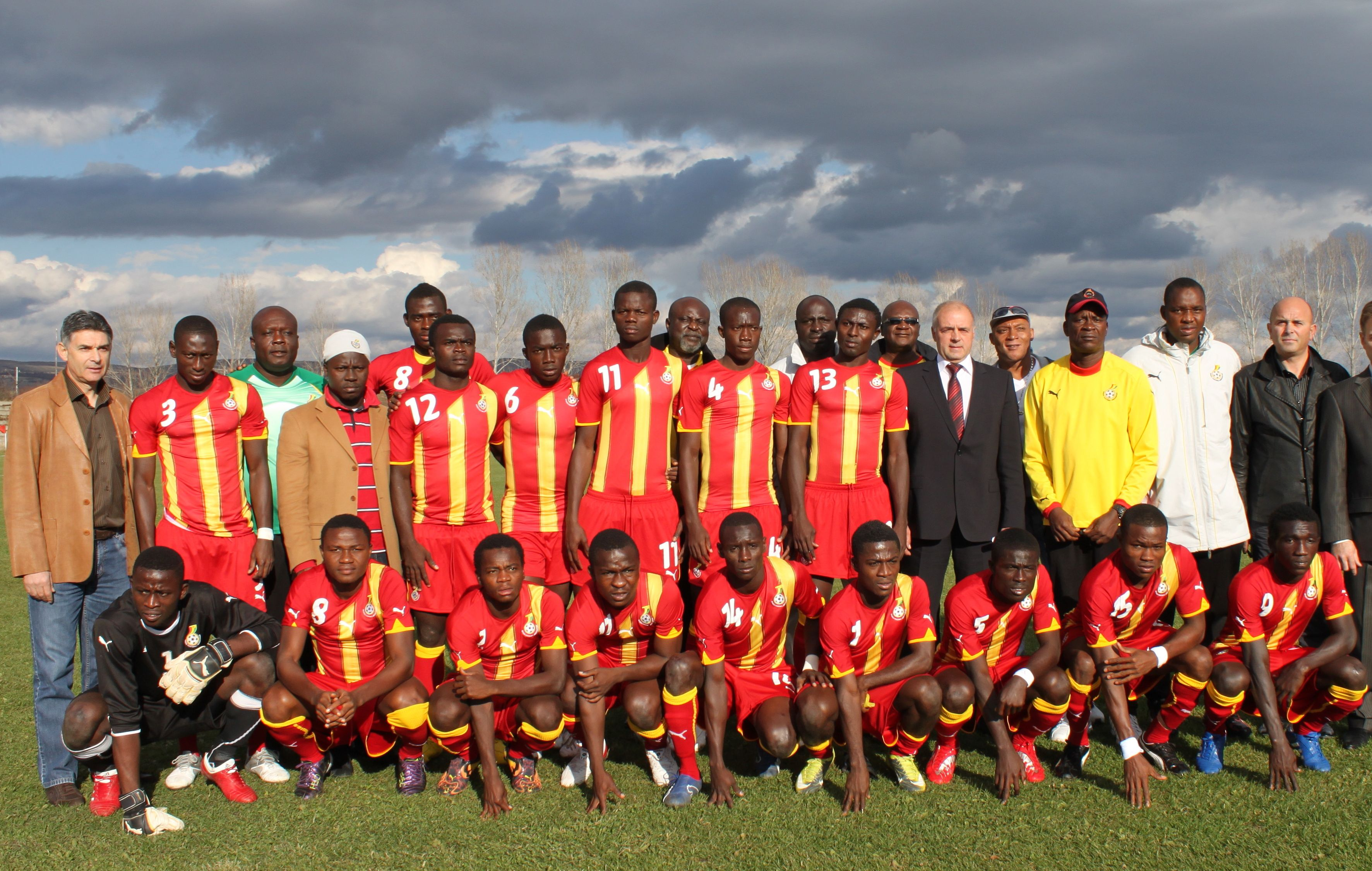
Mali vs Ghana, exhibition game at Paris, 31 March 2015

Since 1957, Ghana has had 32 head coaches and 3 caretakers. C. K. Gyamfi led it to 3 Africa Cup of Nations titles – in 1963, 1965 and 1982 – making Gyamfi the "joint most successful coach" in the competition's history. Fred Osam Duodu led the Black Stars to their 1978 Africa Cup of Nations title; Ratomir Dujković, Milovan Rajevac, James Kwesi Appiah and Otto Addo have led the Black Stars to World Cup qualification, with the first two being Serbs. Carlos Queiroz was appointed in April 2026 as Ghana's head coach ahead of the 2026 FIFA World Cup, replacing Otto Addo after a run of four consecutive losses which culminated in a loss to the German national team in Stuttgart. Former Ghana international Anthony Yeboah later expressed support for Queiroz's squad selection ahead of the tournament, backing the coach's decisions for the 2026 FIFA World Cup.

== Players ==
=== Current squad ===
The following players were called up for the 2027 Africa Cup of Nations qualification matches against Somalia (twice) on 12 and 16 November 2026.

Caps and goals correct as of 12 November 2026, after the match against Somalia.

No.	Pos.	Player	Date of birth (age)	Caps	Goals	Club
1	GK	Lawrence Ati-Zigi	29 November 1996 (age 29)	32	0	(Swiss Football Association) St. Gallen
12	GK	Joseph Anang	8 June 2000 (age 26)	1	0	(Football Association of Ireland) St Patrick's Athletic
16	GK	Benjamin Asare	13 July 1992 (age 34)	16	0	(Ghana Football Association) Hearts of Oak
2	DF	Alidu Seidu	4 June 2000 (age 26)	26	1	(French Football Federation) Nice
4	DF	Jonas Adjetey	13 December 2003 (age 22)	16	1	(German Football Association) VfL Wolfsburg
6	DF	Mohammed Salisu	17 April 1999 (age 27)	23	4	(French Football Federation) Monaco (Note: Monaco is a Monégasque club playing in the French football league system.).
13	DF	Musa Hamzata	4 May 2003 (age 23)	0	0	(Ghana Football Association) Asante Kotoko
14	DF	Gideon Mensah	18 July 1998 (age 28)	47	0	(German Football Association) 1. FC Köln
17	DF	Isaac Afful	1 April 1999 (age 27)	2	0	(Ghana Football Association) Samartex
18	DF	Jerome Opoku	14 October 1998 (age 28)	16	1	(Turkish Football Federation) İstanbul Başakşehir
21	DF	Kojo Peprah Oppong	4 June 2004 (age 22)	8	0	(Turkish Football Federation) Fenerbahçe
3	MF	Caleb Yirenkyi	15 January 2006 (age 20)	18	2	(The Football Association) Coventry City
5	MF	Thomas Partey (Vice-Captain)	13 June 1993 (age 33)	61	15	(Saudi Arabian Football Federation) Al-Shabab
8	MF	Daniel-Kofi Kyereh	8 March 1996 (age 30)	19	0	(German Football Association) VfL Osnabrück
11	MF	Rahim Ibrahim	10 June 2001 (age 25)	1	0	(Slovak Football Association) Slovan Bratislava
15	MF	Ibrahim Sulemana	22 May 2003 (age 23)	10	0	(Italian Football Federation) Sassuolo
22	MF	Augustine Boakye	3 November 2000 (age 26)	2	0	(French Football Federation) Saint-Étienne
	MF	Etse Dogli	1 April 2004 (age 22)	0	0	(Ghana Football Association) Medeama
7	FW	Abdul Fatawu	8 March 2004 (age 22)	35	3	(The Football Association) Ipswich Town
9	FW	Jordan Ayew (Captain)	11 September 1991 (age 35)	125	34	(The Football Association) Sheffield United
19	FW	Felix Afena-Gyan	19 January 2003 (age 23)	12	3	(Turkish Football Federation) Iğdır
20	FW	Mohammed Kudus (Third Captain)	2 August 2000 (age 26)	47	13	(The Football Association) Tottenham Hotspur
23	FW	Brandon Thomas-Asante	28 December 1998 (age 27)	13	1	(The Football Association) Coventry City
25	FW	Prince Kwabena Adu	23 September 2003 (age 23)	9	0	(Football Association of the Czech Republic) Viktoria Plzeň
26	FW	Ibrahim Osman	29 November 2004 (age 21)	4	0	(The Football Association) Brighton & Hove Albion
	FW	Emmanuel Annor	29 April 2003 (age 23)	0	0	(Ghana Football Association) Medeama

=== Latest call-ups ===
The following had been called up in 12 months preceding the above draft.

Pos.	Player	Date of birth (age)	Caps	Goals	Club	Latest call-up
GK	Solomon Agbasi	13 October 2000 (age 26)	1	0	(Ghana) Hearts of Oak	2026 FIFA World Cup ^{PRE}
GK	Paul Reverson	20 June 2005 (age 21)	0	0	(Netherlands) De Graafschap	2026 FIFA World Cup ^{PRE}
GK	Gidios Aseako	19 January 2005 (age 21)	0	0	(Ghana) Dreams	v. Mexico, 22 May 2026 ^{PRE}
DF	Alexander Djiku	9 August 1994 (age 32)	39	4	(Russia) Spartak Moscow	v. Morocco, 4 October 2026
DF	Ebenezer Annan	21 August 2002 (age 24)	7	0	(Romania) Rapid București	v. Morocco, 4 October 2026
DF	Rockson Yeboah	2 August 2004 (age 22)	0	0	(Spain) Osasuna	v. Morocco, 4 October 2026
DF	Abdul Rahman Baba	2 July 1994 (age 32)	54	1	(Greece) PAOK	v. Ivory Coast, 24 September 2026 ^{WD}
DF	Derrick Luckassen	3 July 1995 (age 31)	3	1	(Serbia) Red Star Belgrade	v. Ivory Coast, 24 September 2026 ^{WD}
DF	Nathaniel Adjei	21 August 2002 (age 24)	2	0	(France) Lorient	v. Ivory Coast, 24 September 2026 ^{WD}
DF	Jan Gyamerah	18 June 1995 (age 31)	1	0	(Germany) SV Elversberg	v. Ivory Coast, 24 September 2026 ^{WD}
DF	Marvin Senaya	28 January 2001 (age 25)	6	0	(France) Auxerre	2026 FIFA World Cup
DF	Abdul Mumin	6 June 1998 (age 28)	5	0	(Spain) Girona	2026 FIFA World Cup
DF	Razak Simpson	15 July 1998 (age 28)	8	1	(Finland) VPS	v. Mexico, 22 May 2026
DF	Ebenezer Abban	12 January 1998 (age 28)	2	0	(Brunei) DPMM	v. Mexico, 22 May 2026
DF	Terry Yegbe	25 January 2001 (age 25)	2	0	(Poland) Lech Poznań	v. Mexico, 22 May 2026
DF	Ebenezer Adade	26 May 2002 (age 24)	1	0	(Ghana) Medeama	v. Mexico, 22 May 2026
DF	Antwi Dacosta	6 March 2007 (age 19)	1	0	(Ghana) Young Apostles	v. Mexico, 22 May 2026
DF	Oscar Naasei	24 February 2005 (age 21)	1	0	(Spain) Real Madrid Castilla	v. Mexico, 22 May 2026
DF	David Oduro	12 June 2006 (age 20)	1	0	(France) Annecy	v. Mexico, 22 May 2026
DF	Manu Duah	6 May 2005 (age 21)	0	0	(United States) San Diego	v. Mexico, 22 May 2026
DF	Derrick Köhn	4 February 1999 (age 27)	3	0	(Germany) Union Berlin	v. Germany, 30 March 2026
DF	Patric Pfeiffer	20 August 1999 (age 27)	1	0	(Germany) Darmstadt 98	v. Germany, 30 March 2026
MF	Kwasi Sibo	24 June 1998 (age 28)	14	0	(Libya) Asswehly	v. Morocco, 4 October 2026
MF	Ronald Donkor	20 November 2004 (age 22)	0	0	(United States) New York Red Bulls	v. Morocco, 4 October 2026
MF	Antoine Semenyo	7 January 2000 (age 26)	38	3	(England) Manchester City	v. Ivory Coast, 24 September 2026 ^{WD}
MF	Kamaldeen Sulemana	15 February 2002 (age 24)	30	1	(Italy) Atalanta	v. Ivory Coast, 24 September 2026 ^{WD}
MF	Elisha Owusu	7 November 1997 (age 29)	23	0	(Turkey) Erzurumspor	2026 FIFA World Cup
MF	Majeed Ashimeru	10 October 1997 (age 29)	13	0	Unattached	v. Mexico, 22 May 2026
MF	Salim Adams	11 October 2002 (age 24)	1	0	(Rwanda) Al-Hilal	v. Mexico, 22 May 2026
MF	Emmanuel Agyei	3 November 2004 (age 22)	1	0	(Scotland) Dundee United	v. Mexico, 22 May 2026
MF	Prince Amoako	19 February 2007 (age 19)	1	0	(Denmark) Nordsjælland	v. Mexico, 22 May 2026
MF	Jesurun Rak-Sakyi	5 October 2002 (age 24)	1	0	(Turkey) Kasımpaşa	v. Mexico, 22 May 2026
MF	Abu Francis	27 April 2001 (age 25)	7	0	(France) Toulouse	v. South Korea, 18 November 2025
MF	Prince Owusu	8 October 2004 (age 22)	3	0	(Ghana) Medeama	v. South Korea, 18 November 2025
MF	Kelvin Nkrumah	11 September 2007 (age 19)	0	0	(Ghana) Medeama	v. South Korea, 18 November 2025
FW	Ernest Nuamah	1 November 2003 (age 23)	23	5	(France) Lyon	v. Morocco, 4 October 2026
FW	Christopher Bonsu Baah	14 December 2004 (age 21)	11	0	(Saudi Arabia) Al-Qadsiah	v. Morocco, 4 October 2026
FW	Benjamin Tetteh	10 July 1997 (age 29)	9	0	(United Arab Emirates) Kalba	v. Morocco, 4 October 2026
FW	Mohammed Fuseini	16 May 2002 (age 24)	2	1	(England) Derby County	v. Morocco, 4 October 2026
FW	Iñaki Williams	15 June 1994 (age 32)	28	2	(Spain) Athletic Bilbao	2026 FIFA World Cup
FW	Jerry Afriyie	10 December 2006 (age 19)	6	1	(Belgium) Genk	v. Mexico, 22 May 2026
FW	Aziz Issah	20 November 2005 (age 21)	2	0	(Spain) Barcelona Atlètic	v. Mexico, 22 May 2026
FW	Dan Agyei	1 June 1997 (age 29)	1	0	(Turkey) Kocaelispor	v. Mexico, 22 May 2026
FW	Joseph Opoku	8 August 2005 (age 21)	1	0	(Wales) Swansea City (Note: Swansea City is a Welsh club playing in the English football league system.)	v. Mexico, 22 May 2026
FW	Francis Amuzu	23 August 1999 (age 27)	0	0	(Brazil) Grêmio	v. Mexico, 22 May 2026
FW	Ransford-Yeboah Königsdörffer	13 September 2001 (age 25)	7	0	(Germany) Mainz 05	v. Germany, 30 March 2026
FW	Prince Osei Owusu	7 January 1997 (age 29)	2	0	(Canada) CF Montréal	v. South Korea, 18 November 2025
Notes: ^{CNC} Cancelled match.; ^{WD} Withdrew.; ^{INJ} Withdrew because of injury.; ^{PRE} Preliminary squad.; ^{RET} Retired from international association football.; ^{SUS} Suspended from the team.

=== Local team ===
The football association of Ghana (GFA) administers national teams at levels, including one for the local national team. The team is restricted to players who only play in the local league, thus the Ghana Premier League. It is nicknamed Local Black Stars.

== Player records ==
As of 3 July 2026
Players in bold are still active with Ghana.

=== Most appearances ===
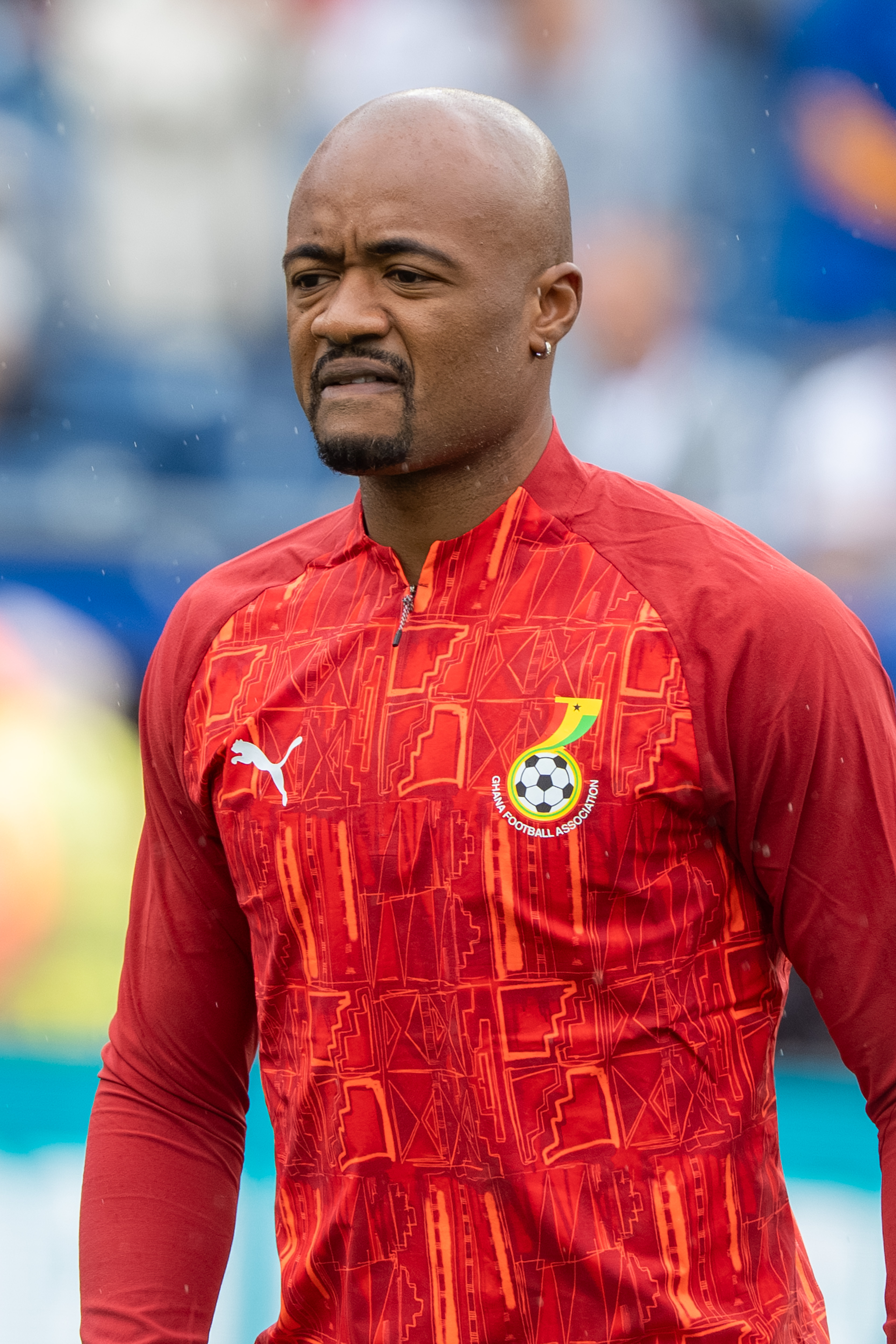
Jordan Ayew is Ghana's all-time most capped player with 124 appearances.

Rank	Player	Caps	Goals	Career
1	**Jordan Ayew**	124	34	2010–present
2	André Ayew	120	24	2007–present
3	Asamoah Gyan	109	51	2003–2019
4	Richard Kingson	93	1	1996–2011
5	John Paintsil	91	0	2001–2013
6	Harrison Afful	86	0	2008–2018
7	Sulley Muntari	84	20	2002–2014
8	John Mensah	81	3	2001–2012
9	Emmanuel Agyemang-Badu	78	11	2008–2017
10	Kwadwo Asamoah	74	4	2008–2019

=== Top goalscorers ===
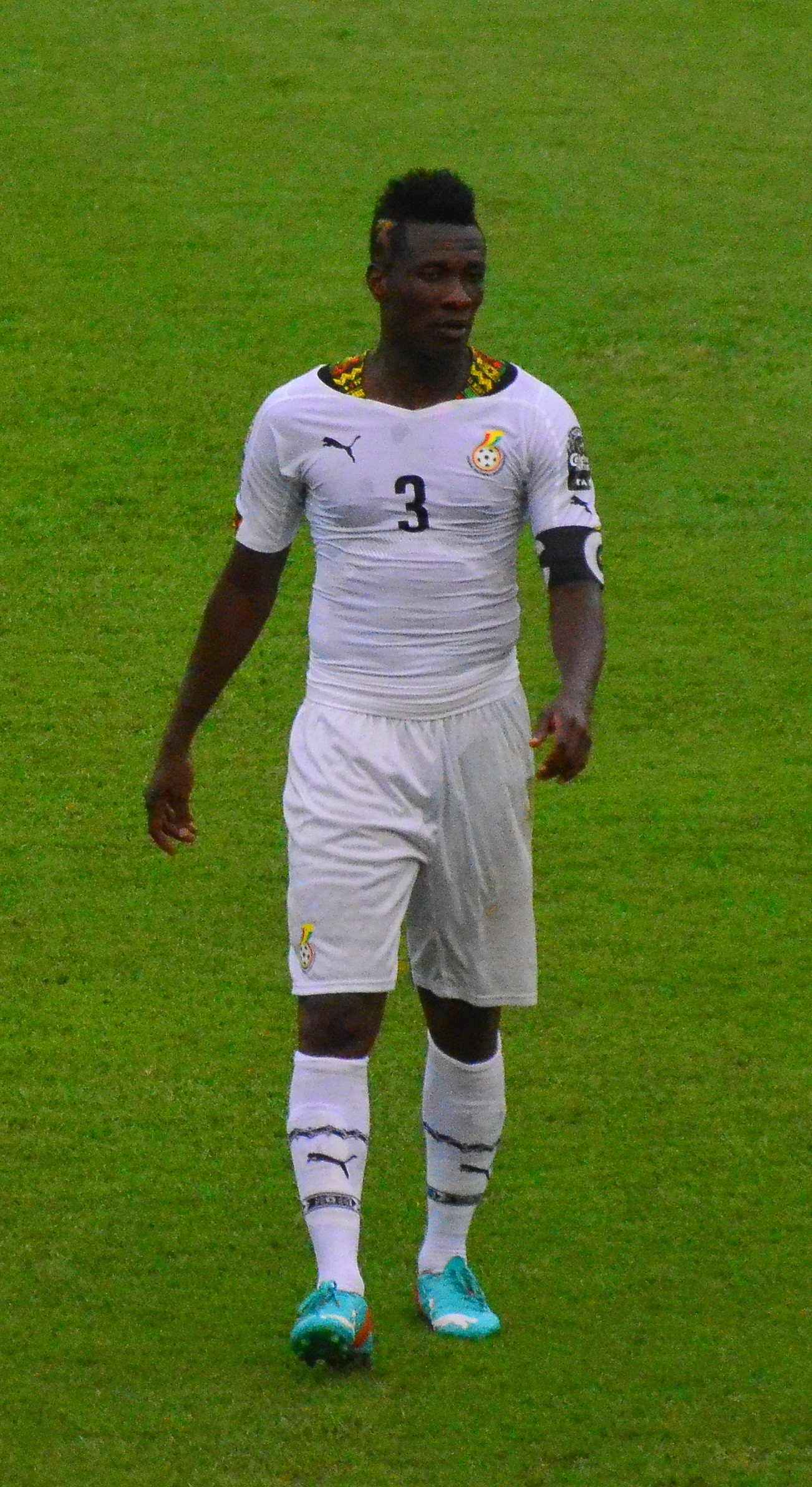
Asamoah Gyan is Ghana's all-time top scorer with 51 goals.

Rank	Player	Goals	Caps	Ratio	Career
1	Asamoah Gyan	51	109	0.47	2003–2019
2	Edward Acquah	45	41	1.1	1956–1964
3	Kwasi Owusu	36	52	0.69	1967–1977
4	**Jordan Ayew**	34	124	0.27	2010–present
5	Tony Yeboah	29	59	0.49	1985–1997
6	Karim Abdul Razak	25	62	0.4	1975–1988
7	André Ayew	24	120	0.2	2007–present
8	Wilberforce Mfum	20	26	0.77	1960–1968
8	Mohammed Polo	20	54	0.37	1960–1968
8	Sulley Muntari	20	84	0.24	2002–2014

=== Captains ===
- Awuley Quaye (1978)
- Kuuku Dadzie (1980–1982)
- Emmanuel Quarshie (1982–1984)
- Isaac Paha (1984)
- James Kwesi Appiah (1984–1992)
- Abedi Pele (1992–1998)
- Charles Akonnor (1999–2001)
- Emmanuel Osei Kuffour (2002)
- Stephen Appiah (2002–2010)
- John Mensah (2010–2012)
- Asamoah Gyan (2012–2019)
- **André Ayew** (2019–2024)
- **Jordan Ayew** (2024–)

== Competitive record ==
=== FIFA World Cup ===
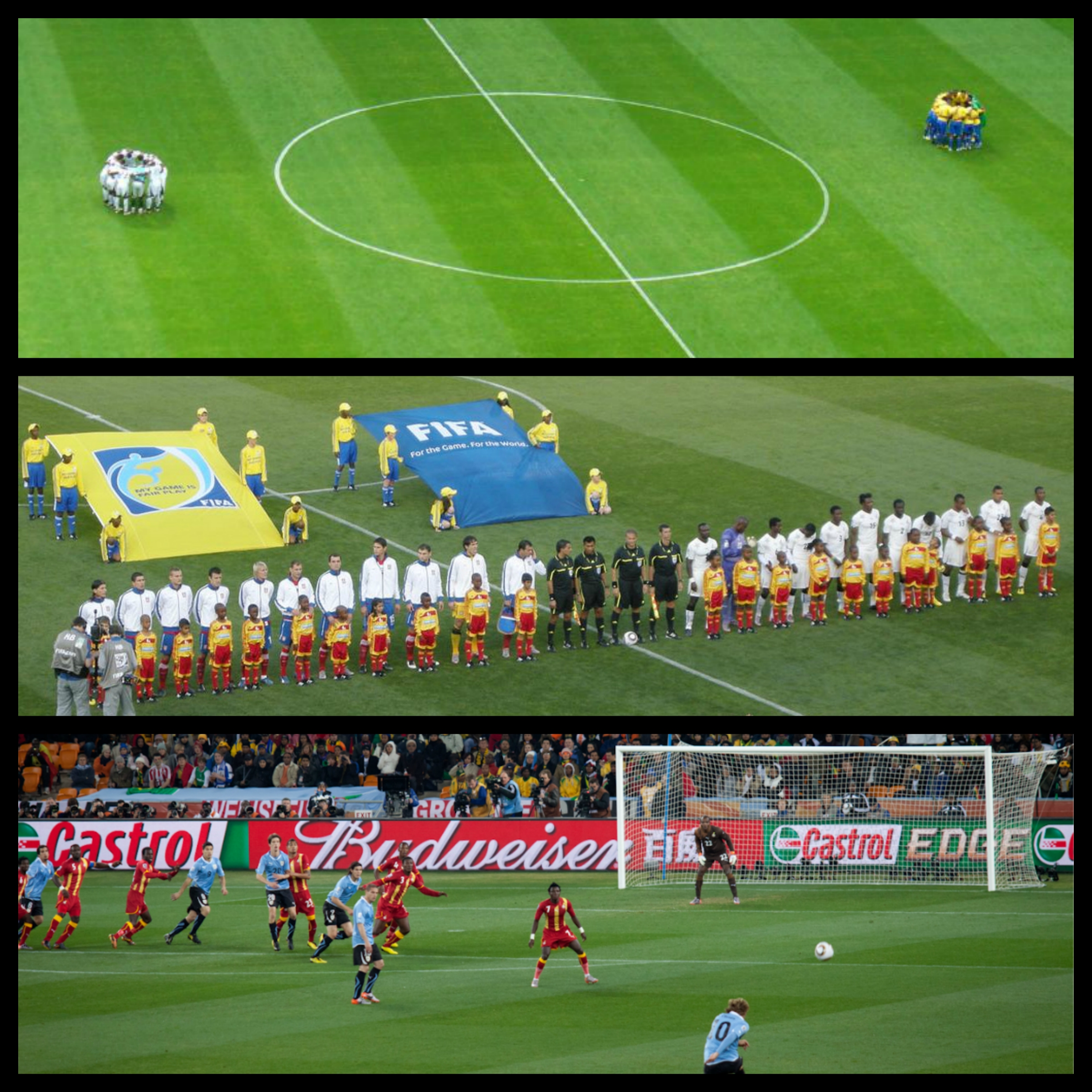
Top: At the 2006 FIFA World Cup in Germany. Center and bottom: Ghana against Uruguay in the 2010 tournament at Soccer City, Johannesburg, South Africa.

Ghana have qualified for 5 FIFA World Cup tournaments, in 2006, 2010, 2014, 2022 and 2026. In 2006, it was the only African side to advance to the second round in Germany, and was the sixth nation in a row from Africa to progress beyond the group stages of the World Cup. Ghana had the youngest team in the 2006 edition with an average age of 23 years and 352 days, and were praised for their improving performance. FIFA ranked Ghana 13th out of the 32 countries who competed in the tournament.

In the 2010 World Cup, Ghana reached the quarter-finals where they were eliminated by Uruguay, after Luis Suárez's handball prevented a possible winning goal. Of the 32 countries that participated in the 2010 edition, FIFA ranked Ghana 7th.

After beating Egypt 7–3 on aggregate in November 2013, Ghana qualified for the 2014 World Cup in Brazil. For the first time, Ghana were eliminated in the group stage, drawing 2–2 against Germany, and losing to the United States and Portugal 2–1. Eight years later, Ghana failed to advance past the group stage again, at the 2022 World Cup in Qatar.

Ghana qualified for the 2026 World Cup as the lowest-ranked African team in the tournament, sitting 74th in the last FIFA ranking before the competition. They were eliminated in the round of 32 after losing 1–0 to Colombia.

FIFA World Cup record										Qualification record						
Year	Round	Position	Pld	W	D	L	GF	GA	Squad	Pld	W	D	L	GF	GA	Campaign
1930 to 1954	Part of United Kingdom									Part of United Kingdom						
(Sweden) 1958	Not a FIFA member									Not a FIFA member						
(Chile) 1962	Did not qualify									4	1	2	1	6	4	1962
(England) 1966	Withdrew									Withdrew						
(Mexico) 1970	Did not qualify									2	0	1	1	2	3	1970
(West Germany) 1974	Did not qualify									6	4	1	1	14	5	1974
(Argentina) 1978	Did not qualify									3	1	0	2	3	5	1978
(Spain) 1982	Withdrew									Withdrew						
(Mexico) 1986	Did not qualify									4	1	2	1	2	2	1986
(Italy) 1990	Did not qualify									2	0	1	1	0	2	1990
(United States) 1994	Did not qualify									4	2	0	2	4	3	1994
(France) 1998	Did not qualify									8	2	4	2	9	8	1998
(South Korea) (Japan) 2002	Did not qualify									10	5	2	3	14	11	2002
(Germany) 2006	Round of 16	13th	4	2	0	2	4	6	Squad	12	8	3	1	24	4	2006
(South Africa) 2010	Quarter-finals	7th	5	2	2	1	5	4	Squad	12	8	1	3	20	8	2010
(Brazil) 2014	Group stage	25th	3	0	1	2	4	6	Squad	8	6	0	2	25	6	2014
(Russia) 2018	Did not qualify									8	2	5	1	9	5	2018
(Qatar) 2022	Group stage	24th	3	1	0	2	5	7	Squad	8	4	3	1	8	4	2022
(Canada) (Mexico) (United States) 2026	Round of 32	24th	4	1	1	2	2	3	Squad	10	8	1	1	23	6	2026
(Morocco) (Portugal) (Spain) 2030	To be determined									To be determined						2030
(Saudi Arabia) 2034	To be determined									To be determined						2034
Total	Quarter-finals	5/17	19	6	4	9	20	26	–	101	52	26	23	163	76	

=== Africa Cup of Nations ===
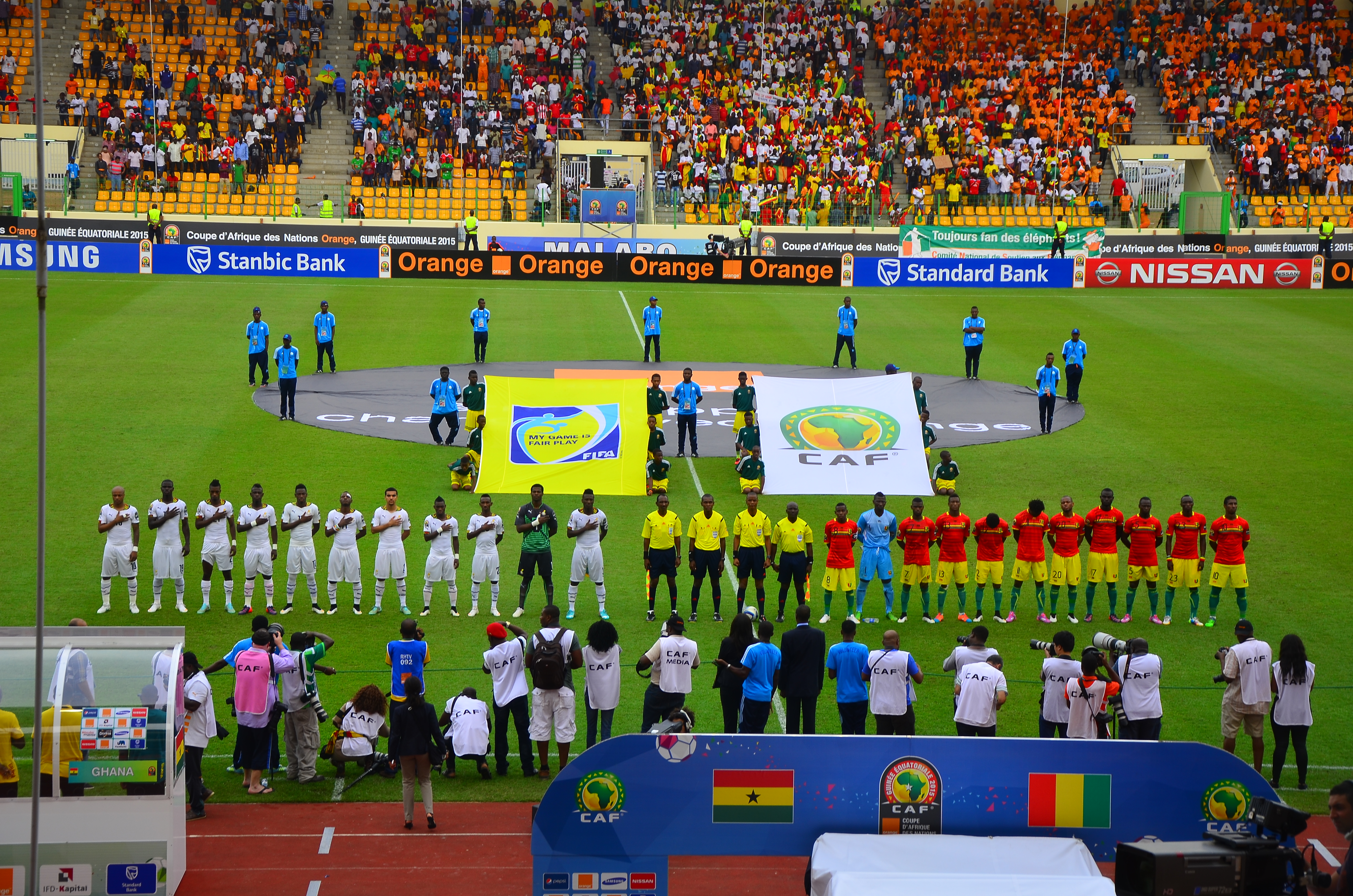
At the 2015 AFCON vs. Guinea in the quarter-finals.

The Black Stars of Ghana have won the Africa Cup of Nations four times: in 1963, 1965, 1978, and 1982, bettered only by Cameroon and Egypt. As the first winner of three AFCON tournaments, Ghana obtained the right to permanently hold the trophy in 1978.

In November 2024, following a 1–1 draw against Angola, Ghana failed to qualify for the 2025 AFCON, missing the tournament for the first time since 2004.

Africa Cup of Nations record										Qualification record						
Year	Round	Position	Pld	W	D*	L	GF	GA	Squad	Pld	W	D*	L	GF	GA	Campaign
(Sudan) 1957	Not affiliated to CAF									Not affiliated to CAF						
(United Arab Republic) 1959	Not affiliated to CAF									Not affiliated to CAF						
(Ethiopia) 1962	Did not qualify									2	0	2	0	2	2	1962
(Ghana) 1963	Champions	1st	3	2	1	0	6	1	Squad	Qualified as hosts						
(Tunisia) 1965	Champions	1st	3	3	0	0	12	5	Squad	Qualified as defending champions						
(Ethiopia) 1968	Runners-up	2nd	5	3	1	1	11	8	Squad	Qualified as defending champions						
(Sudan) 1970	Runners-up	2nd	5	2	2	1	6	4	Squad	2	2	0	0	15	1	1970
(Cameroon) 1972	Did not qualify									2	0	1	1	0	1	1972
(Egypt) 1974	Did not qualify									4	1	0	3	3	7	1974
(Ethiopia) 1976	Did not qualify									4	2	0	2	7	5	1976
(Ghana) 1978	Champions	1st	5	4	1	0	9	2	Squad	Qualified as hosts						
(Nigeria) 1980	Group stage	5th	3	1	1	1	1	1	Squad	Qualified as defending champions						
(Libya) 1982	Champions	1st	5	2	3	0	7	5	Squad	4	2	2	0	6	4	1982
(Ivory Coast) 1984	Group stage	6th	3	1	0	2	2	4	Squad	Qualified as defending champions						
(Egypt) 1986	Did not qualify									4	1	2	1	5	4	1986
(Morocco) 1988	Did not qualify									2	0	1	1	1	2	1988
(Algeria) 1990	Did not qualify									2	1	0	1	1	1	1990
(Senegal) 1992	Runners-up	2nd	5	4	1	0	6	2	Squad	8	5	2	1	11	2	1992
(Tunisia) 1994	Quarter-finals	5th	3	2	0	1	3	2	Squad	2	2	0	0	3	0	1994
(South Africa) 1996	Fourth place	4th	6	4	0	2	7	5	Squad	4	3	0	1	9	3	1996
(Burkina Faso) 1998	Group stage	11th	3	1	0	2	3	3	Squad	4	2	1	1	4	3	1998
(Ghana) (Nigeria) 2000	Quarter-finals	8th	4	1	1	2	3	4	Squad	Qualified as hosts						
(Mali) 2002	Quarter-finals	7th	4	1	2	1	2	2	Squad	6	4	1	1	16	8	2002
(Tunisia) 2004	Did not qualify									4	1	1	2	5	5	2004
(Egypt) 2006	Group stage	10th	3	1	0	2	2	3	Squad	10	6	3	1	17	4	2006
(Ghana) 2008	Third place	3rd	6	5	0	1	11	5	Squad	Qualified as hosts						
(Angola) 2010	Runners-up	2nd	5	3	0	2	4	4	Squad	12	8	1	3	20	8	2010
(Gabon) (Equatorial Guinea) 2012	Fourth place	4th	6	3	1	2	6	5	Squad	6	5	1	0	13	1	2012
(South Africa) 2013	Fourth place	4th	6	3	2	1	10	6	Squad	2	2	0	0	3	0	2013
(Equatorial Guinea) 2015	Runners-up	2nd	6	4	1	1	10	3	Squad	6	3	2	1	11	7	2015
(Gabon) 2017	Fourth place	4th	6	3	0	3	4	5	Squad	6	4	2	0	14	3	2017
(Egypt) 2019	Round of 16	12th	4	1	3	0	5	3	Squad	4	3	0	1	8	1	2019
(Cameroon) 2021	Group stage	19th	3	0	1	2	3	5	Squad	6	4	1	1	9	3	2021
(Ivory Coast) 2023	Group stage	17th	3	0	2	1	5	6	Squad	6	3	3	0	8	3	2023
(Morocco) 2025	Did not qualify									6	0	3	3	3	7	2025
(Kenya) (Tanzania) (Uganda) 2027	Qualification in progress									4	2	0	2	5	6	2027
2028	To be determined									To be determined						
Total	4 Titles	24/35	105	54	23	28	138	93	–	122	66	29	27	199	91	

*Draws include matches decided by penalty shoot-out.

=== West African Nations Cup and WAFU Nations Cup ===
West African Nations Cup (SCSA Zone III)

Year	Round	Position	Pld	W	D	L	GF	GA	GD
(Benin) 1982	Final	Winner	5	3	2	0	14	8	+6
(Ivory Coast) 1983	Final	Winner	4	3	1	0	7	2	+5
(Burkina Faso) 1984	Final	Winner	5	2	3	0	9	5	+4
(Ghana) 1986	Final	Winner	6	5	1	0	12	2	+10
(Liberia) 1987	Final	Winner	5	5	0	0	14	2	+12
Total			25	18	7	0	56	19	+37

West African Football Union Nations Cup

Year	Round	Position	Pld	W	D	L	GF	GA	GD
(Nigeria) 2010	Semi-final	Third place	5	4	0	1	11	3	+8
(Nigeria) 2011	Semi-final	4th place	4	1	0	3	5	8	−3
(Ghana) 2013	Final	Winner	4	3	0	1	9	4	+5
Total			13	8	0	5	25	15	+10

=== Olympic Games ===
Olympic Games record
Year	Round	Position	Pld	W	D	L	GF	GA	Squad
1900 to 1956	Part of United Kingdom								
(Italy) Rome 1960	Did not qualify								
(Japan) Tokyo 1964	Quarter-finals	7th	4	1	1	2	7	12	Squad
Mexico 1968	Group stage	12th	3	0	2	1	6	8	Squad
(West Germany) Munich 1972	Group stage	16th	3	0	0	3	1	11	Squad
(Canada) Montreal 1976	Withdrew after qualifying								
(Soviet Union) Moscow 1980	Withdrew after qualifying								
(United States) Los Angeles 1984	Did not qualify								
(South Korea) Seoul 1988	Did not qualify								
Since 1992	See Ghana national under-23 football team								
Total	Quarter-finals	3/8	10	1	3	6	14	31	–

=== Other tournaments ===
- Nkrumah Cup
  - Champions (3): 1959, 1960, 1963
- Ugandan Independence Tournament
  - Champions (1): 1962
- Pestabola Merdeka
  - Runners-up (1): 1982
- Fajr International Tournament (Iran)
  - Third place (1): 1986
- Samuel K. Doe Cup
  - Runners-up (1): 1986
- Black Stars Tournament (Libreville, Gabon)
  - Third place (1): 1993
- Great Artificial River Championship (Libya)
  - Runners-up (1): 1999
- LG Cup
  - Third place (1): 2003
- Unity Cup
  - Third place (1): 2025

== Head-to-head record ==
=== Against FIFA recognised teams ===
As of 16 November 2026 after the match against Somalia.

Opponent	Pld	W	D	L	GF	GA	GD	Win %
Algeria	13	5	3	5	13	15	−2	38.46
Angola	10	4	4	2	9	7	+2	40.00
Argentina	1	0	0	1	0	2	−2	0.00
Australia	7	1	2	4	4	8	−4	14.29
Austria	2	0	1	1	2	6	−4	0.00
Benin	22	13	6	3	47	16	+31	59.09
Bosnia and Herzegovina	1	0	0	1	1	2	−1	0.00
Botswana	2	1	1	0	1	0	+1	50.00
Brazil	5	0	0	5	2	16	−14	0.00
Burkina Faso	31	14	6	11	42	32	+10	45.16
Burundi	3	2	0	1	2	1	+1	66.67
Cameroon	9	3	4	2	7	6	+1	33.33
Canada	1	0	1	0	1	1	+0	0.00
Cape Verde	7	4	0	3	10	4	+6	57.14
Colombia	1	0	0	1	0	1	−1	0.00
Central African Republic	4	3	1	0	12	5	+7	75.00
Chad	2	1	1	0	6	1	+5	50.00
Chile	2	0	2	0	1	1	+0	0.00
China	3	1	2	0	3	1	+2	33.33
Comoros	5	2	1	2	5	4	+1	40.00
Congo	13	10	2	1	30	13	+17	76.92
DR Congo	14	7	4	3	24	12	+12	50.00
Croatia	1	0	0	1	1	2	−1	0.00
Cuba	1	0	1	0	1	1	+0	0.00
Czech Republic	1	1	0	0	2	0	+2	100.00
Denmark	1	0	0	1	0	1	−1	0.00
Egypt	24	5	7	12	27	34	−7	20.83
England	2	0	2	0	1	1	+0	0.00
Equatorial Guinea	1	1	0	0	3	0	+3	100.00
Eritrea	1	1	0	0	5	0	+5	100.00
Eswatini	3	3	0	0	6	0	+6	100.00
Ethiopia	6	4	1	1	11	3	+8	66.67
Gabon	12	6	4	2	16	10	+6	50.00
Gambia	9	6	1	2	18	10	+8	66.67
Germany (Note: Includes the match against West Germany)	4	0	1	3	4	11	−7	0.00
Greece	1	0	1	0	1	1	+0	0.00
Guinea	22	11	7	4	35	21	+14	50.00
Guinea-Bissau	1	1	0	0	2	0	+2	100.00
Hungary	1	0	0	1	1	2	−1	0.00
Iceland	1	0	1	0	2	2	+0	0.00
India	2	1	1	0	3	2	+1	50.00
Indonesia	2	2	0	0	6	0	+6	100.00
Iran	2	0	0	2	0	5	−5	0.00
Iraq	2	0	0	2	0	5	−5	0.00
Italy	1	0	0	1	0	2	−2	0.00
Ivory Coast	44	15	14	15	55	51	+4	34.09
Jamaica	2	2	0	0	6	2	+4	100.00
Japan	8	2	0	6	11	18	−7	25.00
Kenya	9	5	2	2	35	13	+22	55.56
Latvia	1	1	0	0	1	0	+1	100.00
Lesotho	8	7	1	0	26	7	+19	87.50
Liberia	20	9	7	4	22	16	+6	45.00
Libya	10	2	3	5	8	10	−2	20.00
Madagascar	7	3	2	2	12	7	+5	42.86
Malawi	5	4	1	0	5	0	+5	80.00
Malaysia	1	0	0	1	0	1	−1	0.00
Mali	26	13	9	4	40	22	+18	50.00
Mauritania	1	1	0	0	3	1	+2	100.00
Mauritius	2	2	0	0	9	1	+8	100.00
Mexico	5	0	0	5	1	8	−7	0.00
Montenegro	1	0	0	1	0	1	−1	0.00
Morocco	12	3	3	6	8	9	−1	25.00
Mozambique	7	4	3	0	11	4	+7	57.14
Namibia	2	2	0	0	2	0	+2	100.00
Netherlands	3	0	1	2	1	5	−4	0.00
New Zealand	1	0	0	1	0	2	−2	0.00
Nicaragua	1	1	0	0	1	0	+1	100.00
Niger	16	11	2	3	49	13	+36	68.75
Nigeria	57	22	21	14	81	56	+25	38.60
Norway	1	0	0	1	2	3	−1	0.00
Panama	1	1	0	0	1	0	+1	100.00
Poland	2	0	0	2	3	5	−2	0.00
Portugal	2	0	0	2	3	5	−2	0.00
Qatar	1	1	0	0	6	3	+3	100.00
Russia	1	0	0	1	0	1	−1	0.00
Rwanda	4	2	1	1	6	4	+2	50.00
São Tomé and Príncipe	2	2	0	0	4	1	+3	100.00
Saudi Arabia	5	2	2	1	7	7	+0	40.00
Senegal	13	4	5	4	17	16	+1	30.77
South Korea	8	4	0	4	14	11	+3	50.00
Sierra Leone	17	8	4	5	32	18	+14	47.06
Singapore	1	1	0	0	3	0	+3	100.00
Slovenia	1	0	0	1	0	2	−2	0.00
Somalia	4	4	0	0	10	0	+10	100.00
South Africa	16	5	6	5	14	12	+2	31.25
Sudan	16	10	2	4	25	8	+17	62.50
Switzerland	1	1	0	0	2	0	+2	100.00
Tanzania	8	4	3	1	12	9	+3	50.00
Thailand	2	2	0	0	6	2	+4	100.00
Togo	34	18	10	6	58	31	+27	52.94
Trinidad and Tobago	1	1	0	0	4	0	+4	100.00
Tunisia	18	10	3	5	30	19	+11	55.56
Turkey	2	0	2	0	3	3	+0	0.00
Uganda	16	7	6	3	21	11	+10	43.75
Uruguay	2	0	1	1	1	3	−2	0.00
United States	6	3	0	3	11	10	+1	50.00
Uzbekistan	1	0	0	1	2	3	−1	0.00
Wales	1	0	1	0	1	1	+0	0.00
Zambia	12	7	0	5	15	15	+0	58.33
Zimbabwe	8	5	2	1	14	7	+7	62.50
Total	717	326	186	205	1,088	727	+361	45.47

- Jollof derby

=== Against non-FIFA recognised teams ===
Opponent	Pld	W	D	L	GF	GA	GD
(Brazil) América FC	1	0	0	1	1	2	-1
(Uruguay) Español	1	0	0	1	1	3	-2
(Netherlands) PSV	1	0	0	1	0	1	-1
(Spain) Real Madrid	1	0	1	0	3	3	0
(Brazil) Santa Catarina	3	0	1	2	1	6	-5
(England) Swansea City	1	1	0	0	3	1	+2
(South Korea) Jeju United FC (Note: This club was known as Yukong FC when they played against Ghana)	1	1	0	0	3	1	+2
TOTAL	9	2	2	5	12	17	-5
