= Abedi Pele =

Ghanaian footballer (born 1964)

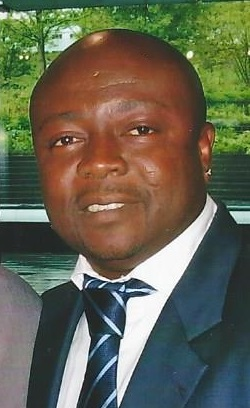
- Abedi in 2007

Personal information
- Full name: Abedi Ayew
- Date of birth: 5 November 1964 (age 61)
- Place of birth: Accra, Ghana
- Height: 1.74 m (5 ft 9 in)
- Position: Attacking midfielder

Youth career
- 1970–1978: Great Falcons

Senior career*
Years	Team	Apps	(Gls)
1980–1982	Real Tamale United	46	(21)
1982–1983	Al Sadd	8	(7)
1984	Zürich	0	(0)
1984	Dragons l'Ouémé	8	(11)
1985	Real Tamale United	19	(7)
1986–1987	Niort	32	(14)
1987	Mulhouse	16	(5)
1987–1993	Marseille	112	(23)
1988–1990	→ Lille (loan)	61	(16)
1993–1994	Lyon	29	(3)
1994–1996	Torino	49	(11)
1996–1998	1860 Munich	50	(2)
1998–2000	Al Ain	31	(28)
Total		461	(150)

International career
1982–1998	Ghana	77	(23)

Managerial career
- 2004–: Nania (Head Coach and President)
Medal record
Men's Football
Representing Ghana
Africa Cup of Nations
Winner	1982 Libya
Runner-up	1992 Senegal
- * Club domestic league appearances and goals

Abedi Ayew (/əˈbeɪdi əˈjuː/ ə-BAY-dee ə-YOO; born 5 November 1964), known professionally as Abedi Pele, is a Ghanaian former professional footballer who played as an attacking midfielder and served as captain of the Ghana national team. He is regarded as one of the greatest African footballers of all time. He played for several European clubs and found his fame in the French Ligue 1 with Lille and Marseille. At the latter, he won the UEFA Champions League in 1993, among other titles. He was also the first to win the CAF award in 1992.

== Early life ==
Abedi Ayew was born into a family in the town of Kibi and grew up in the town of Dome at the northern outskirts of the city Accra.

He attended Ghana Senior High School in Tamale. He was given the nickname "Pelé" due to his ability in football, which evoked comparisons to the late Brazilian athlete Pelé.

== Club career ==
Abedi Pele was one of the first African players to make an impact on European club football. His nomadic career began with Real Tamale United in Ghana in 1978. He left Ghana after the 1982 African Cup of Nations to join Al Sadd in Qatar for a $1,000 transfer fee. After a short spell with FC Zürich in which he did not play a single league match, he returned to Ghana but, after both Kotoko and Hearts of Oak failed to sign him, joined AS Dragons FC de l'Ouémé in Benin. He would later return to Ghana and play for Real Tamale United for one season. He began his career in Europe with French side Chamois Niort, subsequently joining Marseille before transferring to Lille on loan.

At club level, he was a key figure in Marseille's dominance of the French league, resulting in four league championships and two European Cup finals appearances. At Marseille, he was a member of the team's "Magical Trio" along with Jean-Pierre Papin and Chris Waddle, spearheading perhaps Europe's strongest league side of the early 1990s, including a European Cup final defeat in 1991. Abedi Pele was the only remaining member of the trio still with the side when Marseille defeated Milan in the 1993 Champions League final in Munich.

He later joined Lyon after his loan spell at Lille. He also played for Torino of Italy and rounded out his European career with 1860 Munich.

Abedi Pele signed a two-year contract with Al Ain in the United Arab Emirates and was nominated one of the best foreign players to play in the UAE league.

== International career ==
Abedi Pele played for Ghana 73 times. He was a fixture in the African Championships of the 1980s and '90s with his national team, and a member of Ghana's victorious team in the 1982 African Cup of Nations, but he never had an opportunity to play in the FIFA World Cup, as the Black Stars failed to qualify for the competition during his career. However, he was arguably the most dominant figure on the African football scene for nearly a decade. His performance in the 1992 African Cup of Nations, for which he was voted the player of the tournament, was particularly notable, as he scored in three successive rounds to help Ghana reach the final, but picked up a yellow card in the semi-final against Nigeria that meant he was suspended for the final; Ghana went on to lose on penalties to the Ivory Coast. The performance earned him the added nickname of "The African Maradona".

Abedi Pele was one of the first African football players to earn a top placing in FIFA World Player of the Year voting, doing so in 1991 and 1992. He won the France Football African Player of the Year Award three consecutive years, was the inaugural winner of the BBC African Sports Star of the Year in 1992, and the corresponding Confederation of African Football award twice.

Abedi Pele holds the record for most appearances at the African Cup of Nations. He made his first appearance at the in Libya in 1982 and continued to compete at the tournament for the next 16 years, his last appearance coming in the 1998 edition in Burkina Faso. Aside from his exploits at the 1992 competition, he also earned much acclaim for his three goals at the 1996 competition, where he led Ghana to the semi-finals of the competition despite critics expecting him to be in the twilight of his career.

== After retirement ==
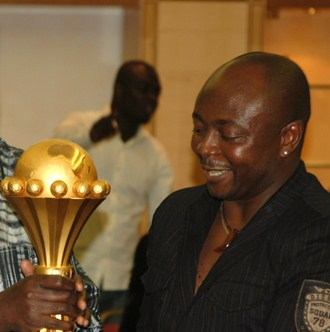
Abedi Pele in December 2007

Abedi Pele has participated in more FIFA organized charity matches than any other African player. He is a member of FIFA's Football Committee, and of the player status committees of both FIFA and CAF. The South African FA made him a spokesperson for their 2006 World Cup bid.

In appreciation of Abedi Pele's service to the country, the Ghanaian government gave him the country's highest honour, the Order of the Volta (civil division). He was the first Ghanaian sportsman to be so honoured.

On 29 January 1997, the first UEFA–CAF Meridian Cup All-Star Match between Europe and Africa was played in Benfica's Estádio da Luz in Lisbon and was televised in 100 countries worldwide, including 30 in Africa, for an audience of 60 million viewers. Abedi Pele scored a goal early in the first half and, after Vincent Guérin had equalised for Europe just before half-time, it was the 1998 African Player of the Year, Mustapha Hadji, who struck Africa's 78th-minute winner in the 2–1 win.

In 2001, the UEFA–CAF Meridian Cup All-Star Match format was changed slightly for the second All-Star Match to bring together players aged between 35 and 45 who now have a 'veteran' status and play the game purely for pleasure. The squad sparked off their memories at club and international level.

=== Football ambassador ===
In June 2001 he was nominated by the present government of Ghana to serve as the next chairman of the FA, an opportunity he later gave up for a more experienced former coach of Ghana for which in his own words said that this was to be an opportunity to learn from his superiors.

At present he owns a first division club, called Nania, with the future hopes of nurturing the young talent to augment the fledgling league of the country. He has also been involved with charity work across the African continent.

=== Controversy ===
Abedi Pele was embroiled in a serious alleged Second Division Promotion Play-off bribery scandal for which the Ghana Football Association found him and others guilty. The guilty verdict attracted fines and suspensions of Abedi Pele and others, but these were quashed by the Appeals Committee of the Football Association after determining that there were irregularities in the initial judgement of the Ghana Football Association. The allegations stem from an astonishing 31–0 victory recorded by his club, Nania FC over a much respected Okwawu United side. A similarly farcical 28–0 result was recorded in another second division match played between Great Mariners and Tudu Mighty Jets on the same weekend. The clubs involved in that Second Division Promotion Play-off Zone III match were also investigated and subject to the prospect of stiff penalties and demotions. Despite his vehement denials, Abedi Pele had been chastised by some members of the Ghanaian media, who were demanding that strong punitive actions be taken against him, by Ghana's football governing body as well as the legal system. His wife Maha Ayew was banned from football against this manipulations scandal on 3 November 2008.

== Style of play and reception ==
As a playmaker, Abedi Pele was known for his speed, close control, and dribbling skills, as well as his passing and goalscoring ability. He usually played as an attacking midfielder or as a forward. He was also given the nicknames the "Maestro" and "The African Maradona." He was also likened to Brazilian footballer Pelé in his youth, which led to his nickname. He is considered by several pundits to be one of the greatest African footballers of all time.

== Personal life ==
Abedi Pele is the brother of Kwame and Sola Ayew (ex-Hearts of Oak and Black Meteors). He is also the father of André, Jordan, Rahim, Imani, and is married to Maha. His sons, Ibrahim, André and Jordan, have also become internationals for Ghana. André and Rahim – represented Ghana in the 2010 FIFA World Cup in South Africa while Jordan and André represented Ghana in the 2014 FIFA World Cup in Brazil and the 2022 FIFA World Cup in Qatar.

== Career statistics ==
=== Club ===
Appearances and goals by club, season and competition
Club	Season			
Club	Season	Division	Apps	Goals
Real Tamale United	1980	Ghana Premier League	11	0
Real Tamale United	1981	Ghana Premier League	12	7
Real Tamale United	1982	Ghana Premier League	23	14
Real Tamale United	Total		46	21
Al Sadd	1982–83	Qatar Stars League	8	7
FC Zürich	1983–84	Nationalliga A	0	0
Dragons l'Ouémé	1984	Benin Premier League	8	11
Real Tamale United	1985	Ghana Premier League	19	7
Niort	1986–87	Division 2	32	14
Mulhouse	1987–88	Division 2	16	5
Marseille	1987–88	French Division 1	5	0
Marseille	1988–89	French Division 1	4	0
Marseille	1990–91	French Division 1	32	5
Marseille	1991–92	French Division 1	36	12
Marseille	1992–93	French Division 1	35	6
Marseille	Total		195	67
Lille (loan)	1988–89	French Division 1	24	7
Lille (loan)	1989–90	French Division 1	37	9
Lille (loan)	Total		61	16
Lyon	1993–94	French Division 1	29	3
Torino	1994–95	Serie A	32	10
Torino	1995–96	Serie A	17	1
Torino	Total		49	11
1860 Munich	1996–97	Bundesliga	25	1
1860 Munich	1997–98	Bundesliga	25	1
1860 Munich	Total		50	2
Al Ain	1998–99	UAE Football League	20	17
Al Ain	1999–2000	UAE Football League	11	11
Al Ain	Total		31	28
Career total			461	150

=== International ===
Appearances and goals by national team and year
National team	Year	Apps	Goals
Ghana
Ghana	1981	1	0
Ghana	1982	17	2
Ghana	1983	5	1
Ghana	1984	0	0
Ghana	1985	6	1
Ghana	1986	5	2
Ghana	1987	2	0
Ghana	1988	1	0
Ghana	1989	0	0
Ghana	1990	2	0
Ghana	1991	0	0
Ghana	1992	6	3
Ghana	1993	4	2
Ghana	1994	4	0
Ghana	1995	3	3
Ghana	1996	6	4
Ghana	1997	7	1
Ghana	1998	3	0
Total		73	19

Scores and results list Ghana's goal tally first, score column indicates score after each Pele goal.

List of international goals scored by Abedi Pele
No.	Date	Venue	Opponent	Score	Result	Competition	Ref.
1	17 February 1982	Cotonou, Benin	Niger	—	2-2	1982 West African Nations Cup	
2	7 July 1982	Kuala Lumpur, Malaysia	Singapore	—	3-0	1982 Merdeka Tournament	
3	28 April 1983	Accra, Ghana	Libya	1-0	1-0	Friendly	
4	14 April 1985	Stade du 28 Septembre, Conakry, Guinea	Guinea	—	4-1	1986 African Cup of Nations qualification	
5	26 February 1986	Accra, Ghana	Liberia	—	3-0	1986 West African Nations Cup	
6	2 March 1986	Accra, Ghana	Togo	1-0	1-0	1986 West African Nations Cup	
7	15 January 1992	Stade Aline Sitoe Diatta, Ziguinchor, Senegal	Zambia	1-0	1-0	1992 African Cup of Nations	
8	20 January 1992	Stade de l'Amitie, Dakar, Senegal	Congo	2-1	2-1	1992 African Cup of Nations	
9	23 January 1992	Stade de l'Amitie, Dakar, Senegal	Nigeria	1-1	2-1	1992 African Cup of Nations	
10	31 January 1993	Baba Yara Stadium, Kumasi, Ghana	Burundi	1-0	1-0	1994 FIFA World Cup qualification	
11	25 July 1993	Samuel Kanyon Doe Sports Complex, Monrovia, Liberia	Liberia	—	2-0	1994 African Cup of Nations qualification	
12	25 February 1995	Ullevaal Stadion, Oslo, Norway	Norway	1-1	2-3	Friendly	
13	25 February 1995	Ullevaal Stadion, Oslo, Norway	Norway	2-3	2-3	Friendly	
14	12 November 1995	Accra Sports Stadium, Accra, Ghana	Sierra Leone	2-0	2-0	Friendly	
15	5 January 1996	Prince Abdullah Al-Faisal Sports City, Jeddah, Saudi Arabia	Saudi Arabia	1-0	1-1	Friendly	
16	14 January 1996	EPRU Stadium, Port Elizabeth, South Africa	Ivory Coast	2-0	2-0	1996 African Cup of Nations	
17	19 January 1996	EPRU Stadium, Port Elizabeth, South Africa	Tunisia	1-0	2-1	1996 African Cup of Nations	
18	10 November 1996	Stade Omar Bongo, Libreville, Gabon	Gabon	1-1	1-1	1998 FIFA World Cup qualification	
19	13 July 1997	Accra Sports Stadium, Accra, Ghana	Zimbabwe	1-0	2-1	1998 FIFA World Cup qualification	

== Honours ==
=== Player ===
Marseille

- French Division 1: 1990–91, 1991–92
- UEFA Champions League: 1992–93; runner-up: 1990–91

Al Ain

- Pro-League: 1999–2000
- UAE President's Cup: 1999

Ghana

- African Cup of Nations: 1982; runners-up: 1992
- West African Nations Cup: 1982, 1983, 1984

Individual

- BBC African Footballer of the Year: 1991
- African Footballer of the Year: 1991, 1992, 1993
- Africa Cup of Nations Golden Ball: 1992
- Africa Cup of Nations Team of the Tournament: 1992, 1994, 1996
- Ghana Footballer of the Year: 1993
- MasterCard African Team of the 20th Century: 1998
- IFFHS African Player of the Century (1901–2000): 3rd Best
- IFFHS All-time Africa Men's Dream Team: 2021
- FIFA World Player of the Year: 9th 1992, Nomination 1991
- FIFA All-Star Forward: 1996 (Reserve), 1997 (Reserve), 1999
- FIFA 100
- Golden Foot Legends Award: 2011
- Ghana Football Awards Living Legend Award: 2022
- Ghana SWAG Best Colts (Young) Player: 1978
- On 26 March 2004, he was appointed a "(WAFUNIF) Special Envoy 4 Peace and Development"
- CAF Top 30 African Footballers in the last 50 years: 5th place

Orders

- OOTV Civil Division: Order of the Volta: (1996)

=== Manager ===
Nania

- Ghanaian FA Cup: 2011
- Ghana Super Cup: 2011
