= Africa XI (football) =

Association football teams representing Africa

First international
- Argentina 2-0 (African Union) Africa XI (Aracaju, Brazil; 15 June 1972)

Biggest win
- (African Union) Africa XI 3-0 Colombia (Salvador, Bahia, Japan; 25 June 1972)

The Africa XI is an association football scratch team consisting of players from the CAF region. The Africa XI play one-off games against clubs, national teams, collectives of other confederations, or a World XI made up of players from all the other continents. The causes for these games are anniversaries, testimonials or for charity.

== History ==
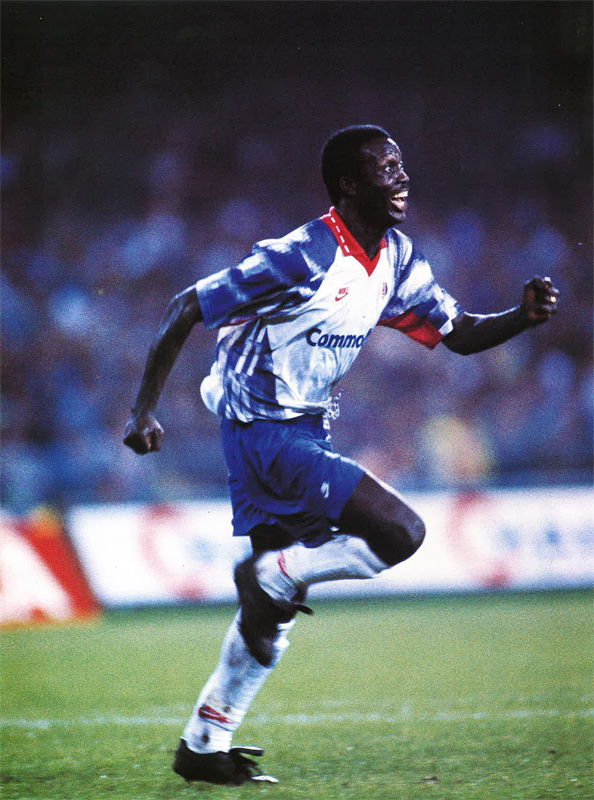
George Weah was selected twice for the Africa XI.

The selection with the best African players have faced national teams and XIs from other continents since the early 1970s. It started in 1972 as the Confederation of African Football selected an XI to participate in the Brazil Independence Cup (alongside the CONCACAF XI). In 1997 the Africa XI beat the Europe XI 2-1 in Lisbon in an iconic Europe XI v Africa XI match, with Moroccan Mustapha Hadji scoring the winning goal.

On 18 July 2007, the Africa XI faced an World XI with both teams unusually composed of retired players. Another legends match followed in 2019 against Morocco's former stars.

== Results ==
=== Official matches ===
11 June 1972

Argentina	2–0	Africa XI
Fischer 40'; Mastrángelo 42'	Report

Batistão, Aracaju
Attendance: 12,826
Referee: José Faville Neto (Brazil)

Brazil Independence Cup

14 June 1972

France	2–0	Africa XI
Blanchet 35'; Floch 83'	Report

Estádio Rei Pelé, Maceió
Attendance: 10,000
Referee: José Faville Neto (Brazil)

Brazil Independence Cup

22 June 1972

CONCACAF	0–0	Africa XI
	Report

Estádio Fonte Nova, Salvador
Attendance: 1,928
Referee: Édison Pérez Nuñez (Peru)

Brazil Independence Cup

25 June 1972

Africa XI	3–0	Colombia
Pokou 8'; Tokoto 39', 55'	Report

Estádio Fonte Nova, Salvador, Brazil
Attendance: 10,579
Referee: José Romei Cañete (Paraguay)

Brazil Independence Cup

29 January 1997

Europe XI	1 – 2	Africa XI
Guérin 43'		Pele 14'; Hadji 78'

Estádio da Luz, Lisbon
Attendance: 8,000
Referee: Vítor Pereira (Portugal)

European Year against Racism

17 August 1999

Africa XI	2–2	FIFA World XI
Bwalya 51', 89'	Report	Häßler 52'; Moravčík 63'

Ellis Park, Johannesburg
Attendance: 25,000
Referee: Ndoya Falla (Senegal)

Farewell game for Nelson Mandela

=== Other matches ===
11 January 2011

Nigeria XI	3-1	World (African) XI (Note: Kanu played for both sides. The World XI (actually made of Africans), managed by Stephen Keshi and Jo Bonfrere included: Peterside Idah; Jean Makoun, Khalilou Fadiga, Anthony Baffoe, Jay-Jay Okocha, Sammy Kuffour, George Boateng, Joseph Yobo, Taye Taiwo, Herman Hreidarsson and Obinna Nsofor, Samuel Eto'o (c), Emmanuel Adebayor, Sulley Muntari, Rigobert Song and Emmanuel Eboue. While Yakubu Ayegbeni made an appearance for Nigeria.)
Kanu; Uche	Report	Adebayor

National Stadium, Lagos
Attendance: 14,000

Nwankwo Kanu´s farewell

25 May 2011

Africa XI	2-4 (Note: World XI (Marcel Desailly): Ashley Cole, Florent Malouda, Matt Lockwood (Dunde), Nigel De Jong, Freddie Ljunberg, Quincy Owusu-Abeyie, Ellis Tebbutt and local players Stephen Baidoo, Augustine Ahinful, Felix Aboagye, Yaw Preko as well as Chelsea reserves Nick Hamann, Oliver Norburn, Fabio Ferreira and Scott Smith.Africa XI (George Weah): Essien (c), Rabah Madjer, Kalusha Bwalya, Nwankwo Kanu, Emmanuel Adebayor, Didier Drogba, Stephen Appiah, John Mensah, Samuel Inkoom, Asamoah Gyan, John Paintsil, Samuel Osei Kuffour, Tony Yeboah, Richard Kingson. Salomon Kalou, Daniel Amokachi, Yakubu Ayigbeni Amokachi, Christopher Kanu.)	World XI
Kalusha Bwalya; Preko 43 ' Malouda; Ashley Cole	Report	Scott Smith; Drogba 58 '

Accra Sports Stadium, Accra
Attendance: 40,000

Peace Charity match, Game of Hope

8 June 2013

Africa XI	4-2 (Note: World XI: Jamal Blackman. Michael Ballack, Ricardo Carvalho, Djibril Cisse.Africa XI: Richard Kingston, Michael Essien (c), George Boateng, Stephen Appiah, Jay-Jay Okocha, Adebayor, all the Ayew brothers, Kwame Ayew, Kwabena Kwabena, Awilo Logomba. Haminu Dramani.)	World XI
Essien pen George Boateng; Okocha; Dramani	Report	Djibril Cisse

Accra Sports Stadium, Accra

Charity match, Game of Hope

27 May 2015

Ghana XI	2-2 (Note: Ghana XI: Richard Kingson (Sammy Adjei); Sulley Muntari, Sammy Adjei, Richard Kingston, Atsu, Agyemany Badu.Africa XI: Razak Brimah (46' Ernest Sowah); Samuel Eto'o, Stephen Appiah, Giuseppe Colucci, Emmanuel Adebayor.)	World (African) XI
Asamoah Gyan; Acheampong	Report	Appiah; Baffour Gyan

Accra Sports Stadium, Accra
Referee: Joseph Wellington

Stephen Appiah ´s testimonial match

27 May 2016

Nigeria XI	5-4	World (African) XI (Note: Yobo played for both sides.Nigeria XI (Amodu Shuaibu): Vincent Enyeama, Efe Ambrose, Emmanuel Emenike, Musa, Yobo, Mutiu Adepoju, Jay-Jay Okocha, Nollywood actor Paw Paw, Danny Shittu, while Nwankwo Kanu, Comedian AY and Ben Iroha came on in the 2nd half. Nwankwo Kanu. World XI (actually made of Africans), managed by David Moyes: Aiyenugba; Onyekachi Okonkwo, Sulley Muntari, Samuel Eto’o, Yobo, Laryea Kingston, Stephen Appiah, Dele Aiyenugba, Lomana Lualua, LMC Chairman, Shehu Dikko, Okocha (2nd half).)
Emenike 13' 18' 28'; Joel Obi 15'; Yobo 43' pen	Report	Muntari 8 '; Eto’o 16' 23'; Paw Paw 54'

Adokiye Amiesimaka Stadium, Port Harcourt
Attendance: 10,000

Joseph Yobo ´s testimonial match

8 June 2016

Asante Kotoko	4-1 (Note: Asante Kotoko: Felix Annan; Evans Quao, Amos Frimpong (c), Stephen Oduro, Halipha Sodogo, Frank Sarfo-Gyamfi, Emmanuel Carlos Osei .Africa XI: Richard Kingson (46 Abukari Damba); Emile Heskey, Stephen Appiah (c), Dwight Yorke, Edgar Davids, Sol Campbell, George Boateng, Alex Song, William Gallas, Laryea Kingson, Sulley Muntari.)	World (African) XI
Osei 44 ' Ofori 65'	Report	Heskey 28 '

Baba Yara Sports Stadium, Kumasi

Vodafone unity Match

11 June 2016

Ghana XI	4-2 (Note: Ghana XI: Ebenezer Assifuah, Thomas Partey, Alfred Duncan.Africa XI: Richard Kingson, Emile Heskey, Dwite Yorke, Edgar Davids, William Gallas, Sol Campbell, Alex Song, Nwankwo Kanu, Yakubu Ayigbene, Michael Essien, Sulley Muntari, Laryea Kingson, John Paintsil, Isaac Vorsah, Stephen Appiah (c).)	World (African) XI
Assifuah; Alfred Duncan; Partey	Report	Muntari; Yakubu

Accra Sports Stadium, Accra

Vodafone unity Match

== Legends ==
18 July 2007

(African Union) Africa XI	3–3	FIFA World XI
Abedi Pele 9'; H. Hassan 30', 50'	Report	Zamorano 6'; Gullit 44'; Guerrero 72'

Newlands Stadium, Cape Town
Attendance: 35,412
Referee: Abdul Ebrahim (South Africa)

90 Minutes for Mandela

== U18 selection ==
Date	Opponent	Stadium	Result	Goals	Reason
27 February 2007	(African Union) U18 Africa XI	Mini Estadi, Barcelona	1–6	Aarón Ñíguez (2×), Manuel Fischer (2×), Bojan Krkić, Aleksandr Prudnikov and Aser Pierrick Dipanda	2007 UEFA–CAF Meridian Cup
1 March 2007	(African Union) U18 Africa XI	Mini Estadi, Barcelona	0–4	Krisztián Németh, Manuel Fischer, Aleksandr Prudnikov, Ádám Dudás	2007 UEFA–CAF Meridian Cup

== Players ==
=== List of captains ===
The list includes all matches.

Period	Team Captain	Notes
1972	(Cameroon) Jean-Pierre Tokoto	Brazil Independence Cup
1997	(Ghana) Abedi Pele	
1999	(Zambia) Kalusha Bwalya	Mandella farewell

== Coaches ==
=== List of coaches ===
Period	Team Captain	Notes
1972	(Egypt) Mohamed El-Guindi	
1997	(Algeria) Rabah Madjer and (Senegal) Mawade Wade	
1999	(South Africa) Jomo Sono	

== See also ==
- World XI
- Europe XI
- Europe XI v Africa XI (1997)
- Africa XI cricket team
