= Tchanile =

Tchanile is a surname. Notable people with the surname include:

- Bana Tchanilé, Togolese football manager
- Tchakala Tchanilé (born 1969), Togolese footballer
- Falilatou Tchanile-Salifou, Togolese sports administrator
