= Jonas Komla =

Togolese football coach

Personal information
- Full name: Jonas Kokou Komla
- Date of birth: 7 June 1975 (age 51)
- Place of birth: Anié, Togo

Managerial career
- Years: Team
- Olympique de Messira
- 2012–2015: Djoliba AC
- 2015–2018: Mali U17
- 2018–2019: Djibouti U20
- 2020–2021: ASC Kara
- 2020–2022: Togo U20
- 2021: Togo (caretaker)

Jonas Kokou Komla (born 7 June 1975) is a Togolese football coach, who is currently manager of ASC Kara and Togo U20.

== Managerial career ==
After managing Malian clubs Olympique de Messira and Djoliba AC, Komla was appointed manager of Mali's under-17's. Komla managed the side at the 2017 FIFA U-17 World Cup in India, leading the country to the semi-finals, where Mali lost 3–1 against Spain. In July 2018, Komla was announced as manager of Djibouti's under-20 side. In January 2020, following the expiration of his contract with Djibouti U20, Komla returned to his native Togo to manage reigning Togolese Championnat National champions ASC Kara. Later that year, in October 2020, Komla was appointed manager of Togo U20.

In May 2021, following the departure of Claude Le Roy, Komla was named as caretaker manager of Togo for the country's 2022 FIFA World Cup qualification ties against Senegal and Namibia due to incoming manager Paulo Duarte's commitments until August 2021.
