= Burkina Faso national football team =

Men's association football team

Burkina Faso
- Nickname(s): Les Étalons (The Stallions); Les faucons pèlerins (The Peregrine Falcons)
- Association: Fédération Burkinabé de Football (FBF)
- Confederation: CAF (Africa)
- Sub-confederation: WAFU (West Africa)
- Head coach: Amir Abdou
- Captain: Bertrand Traoré
- Most caps: Charles Kaboré (102)
- Top scorer: Moumouni Dagano (34)
- Home stadium: Stade du 4-Août
- FIFA code: BFA
| First colours | Second colours | Third colours |

FIFA ranking
- Current: 62 (7 October 2026)
- Highest: 35 (April–May 2017)
- Lowest: 127 (December 1993)

First international
- Upper Volta 5–4 Gabon (Tananarive, Madagascar; 14 April 1960)

Biggest win
- Djibouti 0–6 Burkina Faso (Bissau, Guinea-Bissau; 5 September 2025)

Biggest defeat
- Algeria 7–0 Upper Volta (Oran, Algeria; 30 August 1981); Argentina 7–0 Burkina Faso (Buenos Aires, Argentina; 3 October 2026)

Africa Cup of Nations
- Appearances: 14 (first in 1978)
- Best result: Runners-up (2013)

The Burkina Faso national football team (French: Équipe de football du Burkina Faso) represents Burkina Faso in men's international football and is controlled by the Burkinabé Football Federation. They were known as the Upper Volta national football team until 1984, when Upper Volta became Burkina Faso. They finished fourth in the 1998 Africa Cup of Nations, when they hosted the tournament. Their best ever finish in the tournament was the 2013 edition, reaching the final.

== History ==
Their first international match was played on April 13, 1960, in the Jeux de la Communauté in Madagascar and ended with a 5–4 victory against Gabon.

=== Africa Cup of Nations ===
The country made their first appearance in the Africa Cup of Nations in 1978, but it was not until 1996 that they returned to the biennial tournament. They subsequently qualified for five consecutive tournaments between 1996 and 2004, reaching the semi-finals under coach Philippe Troussier when the tournament was held on home soil in 1998.

Burkina Faso played in Group B of the 2010 Africa Cup of Nations alongside Ghana and Ivory Coast in a three-team group due to Togo's withdrawal. Although they drew their first match against Ivory Coast and needed just a draw against Ghana to progress, the Burkinabe lost 1–0 and failed to qualify for the knock-out stage of the tournament. Burkina Faso took part in the 2012 Africa Cup of Nations, losing all three of their matches and subsequently firing coach Paulo Duarte. Belgian coach Paul Put was announced as new coach in March 2012. Burkina Faso finished first of their group, but lost to Nigeria in the final of the 2013 Africa Cup of Nations.

The team would earn third place at the 2017 Africa Cup of Nations. The team made the semifinals of AFCON in 2022. The team beat Tunisia 1-0 in the quarterfinals to reach the semifinals. In the semifinals, the team lost to Senegal 1-3. Senegal went on to win the Championship. The Burkina Faso team lost in the 3rd place match to Cameroon on penalty kicks 5-3.

=== World Cup qualifying ===
Burkina Faso first entered the World Cup in the 1978 qualifying tournament, beating Mauritania in the preliminary round before losing 1–3 against Ivory Coast. They next entered World Cup qualifying in 1990, losing in the first round to Libya 2–3. Burkina Faso withdrew from the 1994 competition but returned in 1998, beating Mauritania again to make it to the final qualifying group stage, however they failed to obtain a single point, finishing bottom of their group. They beat Ethiopia in 2002 to again make it to the qualifying group stage, but did not advance, only winning one game against Malawi.

The team had a strong showing in the 2014 World Cup qualification campaign, reaching the final round of qualifying where it faced Algeria. It won 3–2 in Ouagadougou, but lost 1–0 in Blida. Despite the 3-3 aggregate, Burkina Faso narrowly missed out on the 2014 World Cup due to the away goals rule.

== Nickname ==
The team is nicknamed Les Etalons, which means "The Stallions". It is in reference to the legendary horse of Princess Yennenga. Supporters of the team at times include a percussion band, which often mimics the sounds of galloping horses at matches. The team supporters are known for their colorful attire at matches.

== Results and fixtures ==
The following is a list of match results in the last 12 months, as well as any future matches that have been scheduled.

Win Draw Loss Fixture

=== 2025 ===
| 14 November Friendly | Burkina Faso | 3–2 | Niger | Mohammedia, Morocco |
| | Kaboré 34', 45+3', 57' | Report | Badamassi 24'; Sosah 55' | Stadium: El Bachir Stadium |

| 18 November Friendly | Burkina Faso | 3–0 | Benin | Mohammedia, Morocco |
| 17:00 UTC+1 | Minoungou 25', 45+3'; Simpore 90+4' | Report | | Stadium: El Bachir Stadium |

| 24 December 2025 AFCON GS | Burkina Faso | 2–1 | Equatorial Guinea | Casablanca, Morocco |
| 13:30 UTC+1 | Minoungou 90+5'; Tapsoba 90+8' | Report | Ndong (red card) 50'; Anieboh 85' | Stadium: Mohammed V Stadium; Attendance: 10,267; Referee: Mohamed Maarouf (Egypt) |

| 28 December 2025 AFCON GS | Algeria | 1–0 | Burkina Faso | Rabat, Morocco |
| 18:30 UTC+1 | Mahrez 23' (pen.) | Report | | Stadium: Moulay Hassan Stadium; Attendance: 18,522; Referee: Daniel Nii Laryea (Ghana) |

| 31 December 2025 AFCON GS | Sudan | 0–2 | Burkina Faso | Casablanca, Morocco |
| 17:00 UTC+1 | | Report | L. Traoré 16'; Kouassi 85' | Stadium: Mohammed V Stadium; Attendance: 10,084; Referee: Amin Mohamed Omar (Egypt) |

=== 2026 ===
| 6 January 2025 AFCON R16 | Ivory Coast | 3–0 | Burkina Faso | Marrakesh, Morocco |
| 20:00 UTC+1 | Amad 20'; Y. Diomande 32'; Touré 87' | Report | | Stadium: Marrakesh Stadium; Referee: Mahmood Ismail (Sudan) |

| 28 March Friendly | Burkina Faso | 5–0 | Guinea-Bissau | Ouagadougou, Burkina Faso |
| 19:00 UTC+1 | P. Kaboré 26'; Ouattara 40'; E. Kaboré 61', 73', 88' | Report | | Stadium: Stade du 4 Août; Referee: Moussa Ahamadou Alou (Niger) |

| 31 March Friendly | Burkina Faso | 1–1 | Guinea-Bissau | Ouagadougou, Burkina Faso |
| 18:00 UTC+0 | Nagalo 85' | | F. Gomes 90+6' | Stadium: Stade du 4 Août; Referee: Moussa Ahamadou Alou (Niger) |

| 5 June Friendly | Russia | 3–0 | Burkina Faso | Volgograd, Russia |
| 20:00 UTC+3 | Sadulayev 15'; Al. Miranchuk 20'; Vakhaniya 73' | Report | | Stadium: Volgograd Arena; Attendance: 41,035; Referee: Nenad Minaković (Serbia) |

| 9 June Friendly | Belarus | 2–2 | Burkina Faso | Minsk, Belarus |
| 19:30 UTC+3 | Malkevich 56'; Vardanyan 67' | Report | Kaboré 72'; Tapsoba 85' | Stadium: National Football Stadium; Attendance: 15,874; Referee: Rafael Shafeev (Russia) |

| 25 September 2027 AFCON qualification | Burkina Faso | 1–1 | Benin | Ouagadougou, Burkina Faso |
| 19:00 UTC+1 | Traoré 20' (pen.) | Report | Tosin 68' (pen.) | Stadium: Stade du 4 Août; Referee: Omar Artan (Somalia) |

| 28 September 2027 AFCON qualification | Central African Republic | 0–1 | Burkina Faso | Casablanca, Morocco |
| 16:00 UTC+0 | | Report | Camara 60' | Stadium: Larbi Zaouli Stadium; Referee: Aldair Grabe (Guinea-Bissau) |

| 3 October Friendly | Argentina | 7–0 | Burkina Faso | Buenos Aires, Argentina |
| 21:00 UTC−3 | La. Martínez 4'; Diallo 8' (o.g.); Prestianni 12'; Paz 35'; Alvarez 36'; Mastantuono 57'; Simeone 90+3' | Report | | Stadium: Estadio Monumental; Referee: José Cabero (Chile) |

| 11 November 2027 AFCON qualification | Burkina Faso | v | Mauritania | TBD, Burkina Faso |
| TBD | | | | Stadium: TBD |

| 15 November 2027 AFCON qualification | Mauritania | v | Burkina Faso | TBD, Mauritania |
| TBD | | | | Stadium: TBD |

=== 2027 ===
| 24 March 2027 AFCON qualification | Benin | v | Burkina Faso | TBD, Benin |
| TBD | | | | Stadium: TBD |

| 28 March 2027 AFCON qualification | Burkina Faso | v | Central African Republic | TBD, Burkina Faso |
| TBD | | | | Stadium: TBD |

== Coaching staff ==
| Position | Name |
|---|---|
| Head coach | (Comoros) Amir Abdou |
| Assistant coaches | (Algeria) Bouziane Benaraïbi (Burkina Faso) Jonathan Zongo |
| Goalkeeping coach | (Burkina Faso) Aurélien Yaméogo |
| Fitness coach | (France) Julien Redon |
| Match analyst | (Burkina Faso) Ismaïla Boussouma |
| Doctor | (Burkina Faso) Dr. Cheick Tiendrebéogo |
| Physiotherapists | (Burkina Faso) Moussa Kiemdé (Burkina Faso) Christophe Zongo (Burkina Faso) Boubacarr Tapsoba (Burkina Faso) Évariste Nikiéma |
| Team coordinator | (Burkina Faso) Charles Kaboré |
| Technical director | (Burkina Faso) Kamou Malo |

=== Coaching history ===
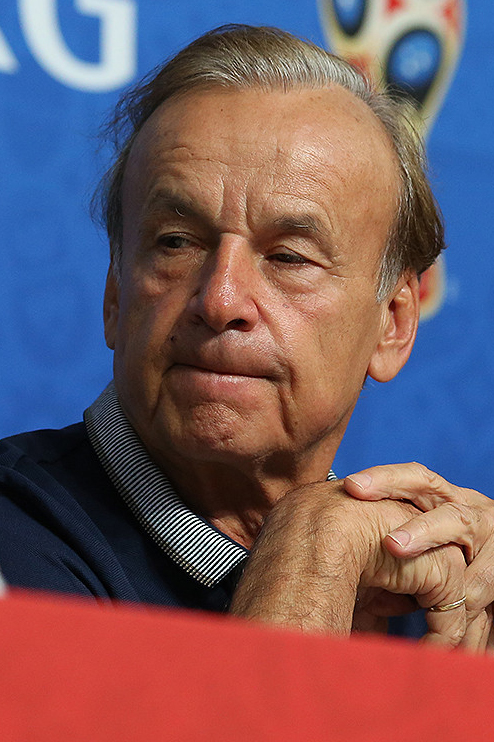
Gernot Rohr became the manager of Burkina Faso in 2015

- (West Germany) Otto Pfister (1976–1978)
- (West Germany) Heinz-Peter Überjahn (1988–1990)
- (Burkina Faso) Idrissa Traoré (1992–1996)
- (Burkina Faso) Calixte Zagre (1996)
- (Bulgaria) Ivan Vutov (1996–1997)
- (Ghana) Malik Jabir (1997)
- (France) Philippe Troussier (1997–1998)
- (France) Didier Notheaux (1998–1999)
- (Belgium) René Taelman (2000)
- (Burkina Faso) Sidiki Diarra (2000–2001)
- (Argentina) Oscar Fulloné (2001–2002)
- (Burkina Faso) Jacques Yaméogo & (Burkina Faso) Pihouri Weboanga (2002)
- (Burkina Faso) Jean-Paul Rabier (2002–2004)
- (Serbia and Montenegro) Ivica Todorov (2004–2005)
- (France) Bernard Simondi (2005–2006)
- (Burkina Faso) Idrissa Traoré (2006–2007)
- (France) Didier Notheaux & (Burkina Faso) Sidiki Diarra (2007)
- (Portugal) Paulo Jorge Rebelo Duarte (2008–2012)
- (Belgium) Paul Put (2012–2015)
- (Germany) Gernot Rohr (2015)
- (Portugal) Paulo Duarte (2015–2019)
- (Burkina Faso) Kamou Malo (2019–2022)
- (France) Hubert Velud (2022–2024)
- (Burkina Faso) Brama Traoré (2024–2026)
- (Comoros) Amir Abdou (2026–)

== Players ==
=== Current squad ===
The following players were called up for the 2027 Africa Cup of Nations qualification Group F matches against Benin and Central African Republic and the friendly match against Argentina on 25, 28 September and 3 October 2026; respectively.

Caps and goals correct as of 28 September 2026, after the match against Central African Republic.

| No. | Pos. | Player | Date of birth (age) | Caps | Goals | Club |
|---|---|---|---|---|---|---|
| 1 | GK | Farid Ouédraogo | 26 December 1996 (age 29) | 10 | 0 | (Sudan Football Association) Al Hilal |
| 16 | GK | Hervé Koffi | 16 October 1996 (age 29) | 72 | 0 | (Royal Belgian Football Association) Union Saint-Gilloise |
| 23 | GK | Kilian Nikiema | 22 June 2003 (age 23) | 10 | 0 | (Royal Dutch Football Association) ADO Den Haag |
| 4 | DF | Ismael Maiga | 23 November 2003 (age 22) | 0 | 0 | (Football Association of Serbia) Čukarički |
| 5 | DF | Nasser Djiga | 15 November 2002 (age 23) | 13 | 1 | (The Football Association) Wolverhampton Wanderers |
| 9 | DF | Issa Kaboré | 12 May 2001 (age 25) | 54 | 2 | (Football Association of Wales) Wrexham |
| 12 | DF | Edmond Tapsoba | 2 February 1999 (age 27) | 64 | 4 | (German Football Association) Bayer Leverkusen |
| 14 | DF | Rachide Gnanou | 16 November 2004 (age 21) | 3 | 0 | (Football Association of Finland) Gnistan |
| 22 | DF | Arthur Zagré | 4 October 2001 (age 25) | 3 | 0 | (Royal Dutch Football Association) Utrecht |
| 25 | DF | Mamoutou Ouédraogo | 30 November 2006 (age 19) | 0 | 0 | (Moldovan Football Federation) Sheriff Tiraspol |
| 26 | DF | Arsène Kouassi | 11 September 2004 (age 22) | 9 | 1 | (French Football Federation) Lorient |
| 6 | MF | Julien Bationo | 12 October 2005 (age 21) | 0 | 0 | (Slovak Football Association) DAC Dunajska Streda |
| 8 | MF | Lohann Doucet | 14 September 2002 (age 24) | 4 | 0 | (Portuguese Football Federation) Vitória de Guimarães |
| 13 | MF | Chec Bebel Doumbia | 15 November 2007 (age 18) | 1 | 0 | (Romanian Football Federation) Rapid București |
| 18 | MF | Ismahila Ouédraogo | 5 November 1999 (age 26) | 27 | 0 | (Danish Football Association) Odense |
| 20 | MF | Rachid Kouda | 25 July 2002 (age 24) | 2 | 0 | (Italian Football Federation) Mantova |
| 21 | MF | Axel Taonsa | 7 February 2004 (age 22) | 1 | 0 | (Swedish Football Association) Västerås |
| 2 | FW | Lassina Traoré | 12 January 2001 (age 25) | 33 | 14 | (Ukrainian Association of Football) Shakhtar Donetsk |
| 3 | FW | Aboubacar Camara | 30 September 2006 (age 20) | 1 | 1 | (Austrian Football Association) Red Bull Salzburg |
| 11 | FW | Ousseni Bouda | 28 April 2000 (age 26) | 16 | 2 | (United States Soccer Federation) San Jose Earthquakes |
| 15 | FW | Abdoul Tapsoba | 23 August 2001 (age 25) | 29 | 6 | (Polish Football Association) Radomiak Radom |
| 17 | FW | Elohim Kaboré | 20 December 2006 (age 19) | 3 | 1 | (Royal Belgian Football Association) Beveren |
| 19 | FW | Georgi Minoungou | 25 July 2002 (age 24) | 11 | 1 | (United States Soccer Federation) Colorado Rapids |
| 27 | FW | Pierre Landry Kaboré | 5 July 2001 (age 25) | 12 | 3 | (Scottish Football Association) Heart of Midlothian |
| | FW | Dango Ouattara | 11 February 2002 (age 24) | 40 | 12 | (The Football Association) Brentford |

=== Recent call-ups ===
The following players have also been called up for Burkina Faso in the last twelve months.

| Pos. | Player | Date of birth (age) | Caps | Goals | Club | Latest call-up |
|---|---|---|---|---|---|---|
| GK | Hillel Konaté | 28 December 1994 (age 31) | 5 | 0 | (France) Troyes | v. Belarus, 9 June 2026 |
| GK | Ladji Brahima Sanou | 21 April 2003 (age 23) | 3 | 0 | (Sudan) Al-Merrikh | v. Ethiopia, 12 October 2025 |
| DF | Adamo Nagalo | 22 September 2002 (age 24) | 22 | 0 | (Netherlands) PSV Eindhoven | v. Belarus, 9 June 2026 |
| DF | Saïdou Simporé | 31 August 1992 (age 34) | 17 | 1 | National Bank of Egypt | v. Belarus, 9 June 2026 |
| DF | Mohamed Ouédraogo | 2 January 2003 (age 23) | 9 | 0 | (Austria) Rheindorf Altach | v. Belarus, 9 June 2026 |
| DF | Cyril Dao | 10 November 2005 (age 20) | 0 | 0 | National Bank of Egypt | v. Belarus, 9 June 2026 |
| DF | Hanaby Hadalou Sagne | 20 December 2000 (age 25) | 0 | 0 | (Burkina Faso) AS Douanes | v. Belarus, 9 June 2026 |
| DF | Dylan Ouédraogo | 22 July 1998 (age 28) | 2 | 0 | (Cyprus) Krasava ENY | v. Guinea-Bissau, 31 March 2026 |
| DF | Steeve Yago (third captain) | 16 December 1992 (age 33) | 93 | 1 | (Cyprus) Aris Limassol | 2025 Africa Cup of Nations |
| DF | Issoufou Dayo (vice-captain) | 6 August 1991 (age 35) | 84 | 9 | (Qatar) Umm-Salal | 2025 Africa Cup of Nations |
| DF | Abdoul Ayinde | 17 July 2005 (age 21) | 3 | 0 | (Belgium) Gent | 2025 Africa Cup of Nations |
| MF | Gustavo Sangaré | 8 November 1996 (age 29) | 40 | 2 | (Armenia) Noah | v. Belarus, 9 June 2026 |
| MF | Mohamed Zougrana | 29 October 2001 (age 24) | 7 | 2 | (Algeria) MC Alger | v. Belarus, 9 June 2026 |
| MF | Aboubacar Bassinga | 13 July 2005 (age 21) | 2 | 0 | (Spain) Ceuta | v. Belarus, 9 June 2026 |
| MF | Blati Touré | 4 August 1994 (age 32) | 60 | 3 | (Egypt) Pyramids | v. Guinea-Bissau, 31 March 2026 |
| MF | Ibrahim Bancé | 15 January 2001 (age 25) | 2 | 0 | (South Africa) Marumo Gallants | v. Guinea-Bissau, 31 March 2026 |
| MF | Cedric Badolo | 4 November 1998 (age 27) | 31 | 0 | (Slovakia) Spartak Trnava | 2025 Africa Cup of Nations |
| MF | Stephane Aziz Ki | 6 March 1996 (age 30) | 22 | 3 | (Morocco) Wydad Casablanca | 2025 Africa Cup of Nations |
| MF | Josué Tiendrébéogo | 21 November 2002 (age 23) | 10 | 2 | (France) Annecy | 2025 Africa Cup of Nations |
| MF | Abdoul Yoda | 20 December 2000 (age 25) | 3 | 0 | (Moldova) Milsami Orhei | 2025 Africa Cup of Nations |
| FW | Mohamed Konaté | 12 December 1997 (age 28) | 38 | 6 | (Russia) Akhmat Grozny | v. Belarus, 9 June 2026 |
| FW | Cyriaque Irié | 20 June 2005 (age 21) | 9 | 2 | (Germany) SC Freiburg | v. Belarus, 9 June 2026 |
| FW | Jack Diarra | 16 June 2006 (age 20) | 1 | 0 | (Tunisia) Espérance de Tunis | v. Guinea-Bissau, 31 March 2026 |
| FW | Bertrand Traoré (captain) | 6 September 1995 (age 31) | 88 | 21 | (England) Wolverhampton Wanderers | 2025 Africa Cup of Nations |
Notes: ^{WD} = Player withdrew from the squad due to non-injury issue.; ^{INJ} = Player withdrew from the squad due to an injury.; ^{PRE} = Preliminary squad.; ^{RET} = Player has retired from international football.; ^{SUS} = Suspended from the national team.

== Records ==
As of 6 January 2026
Players in bold are still active with Burkina Faso.

=== Most appearances ===
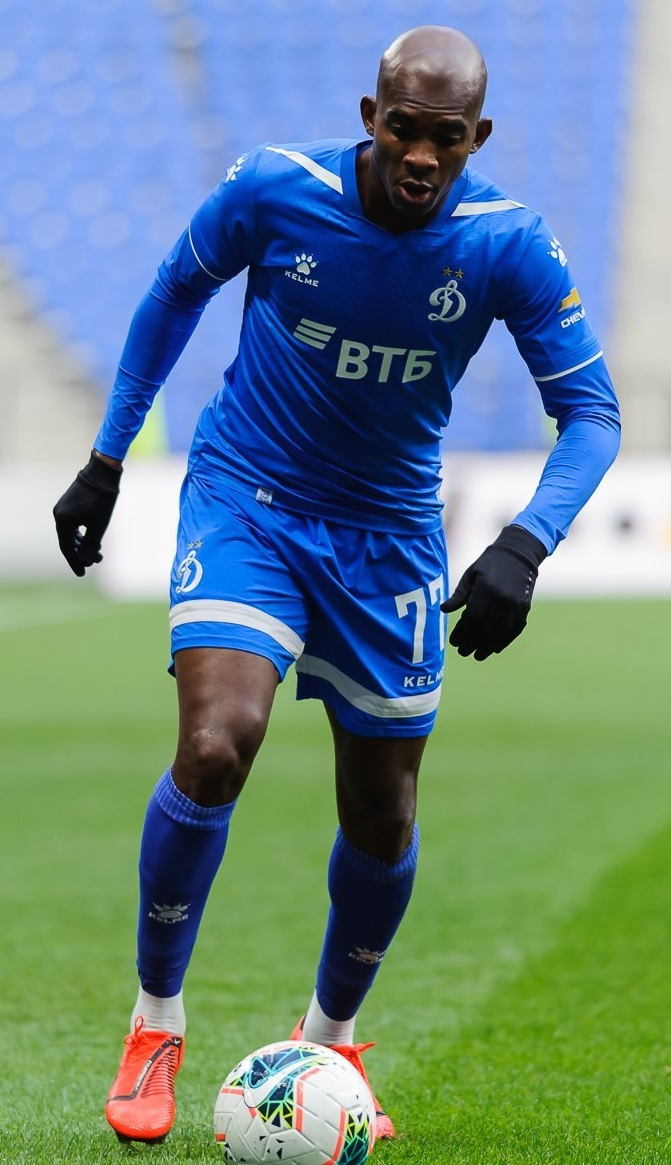
Charles Kaboré has the most appearances for Burkina Faso with 102.

| Rank | Player | Caps | Goals | Career |
|---|---|---|---|---|
| 1 | Charles Kaboré | 102 | 4 | 2006–2021 |
| 2 | **Steeve Yago** | 96 | 1 | 2013–present |
| 3 | **Issoufou Dayo** | 92 | 9 | 2012–present |
| 4 | **Bertrand Traoré** | 91 | 22 | 2011–present |
| 5 | Jonathan Pitroipa | 84 | 19 | 2006–2019 |
| 6 | Moumouni Dagano | 83 | 34 | 1998–2013 |
| 6 | Bakary Koné | 83 | 0 | 2006–2019 |
| 8 | Aristide Bancé | 79 | 24 | 2003–2019 |
| 9 | **Hervé Koffi** | 72 | 0 | 2016–present |
| 10 | Saïdou Panandétiguiri | 66 | 2 | 2002–2013 |

=== Top goalscorers ===
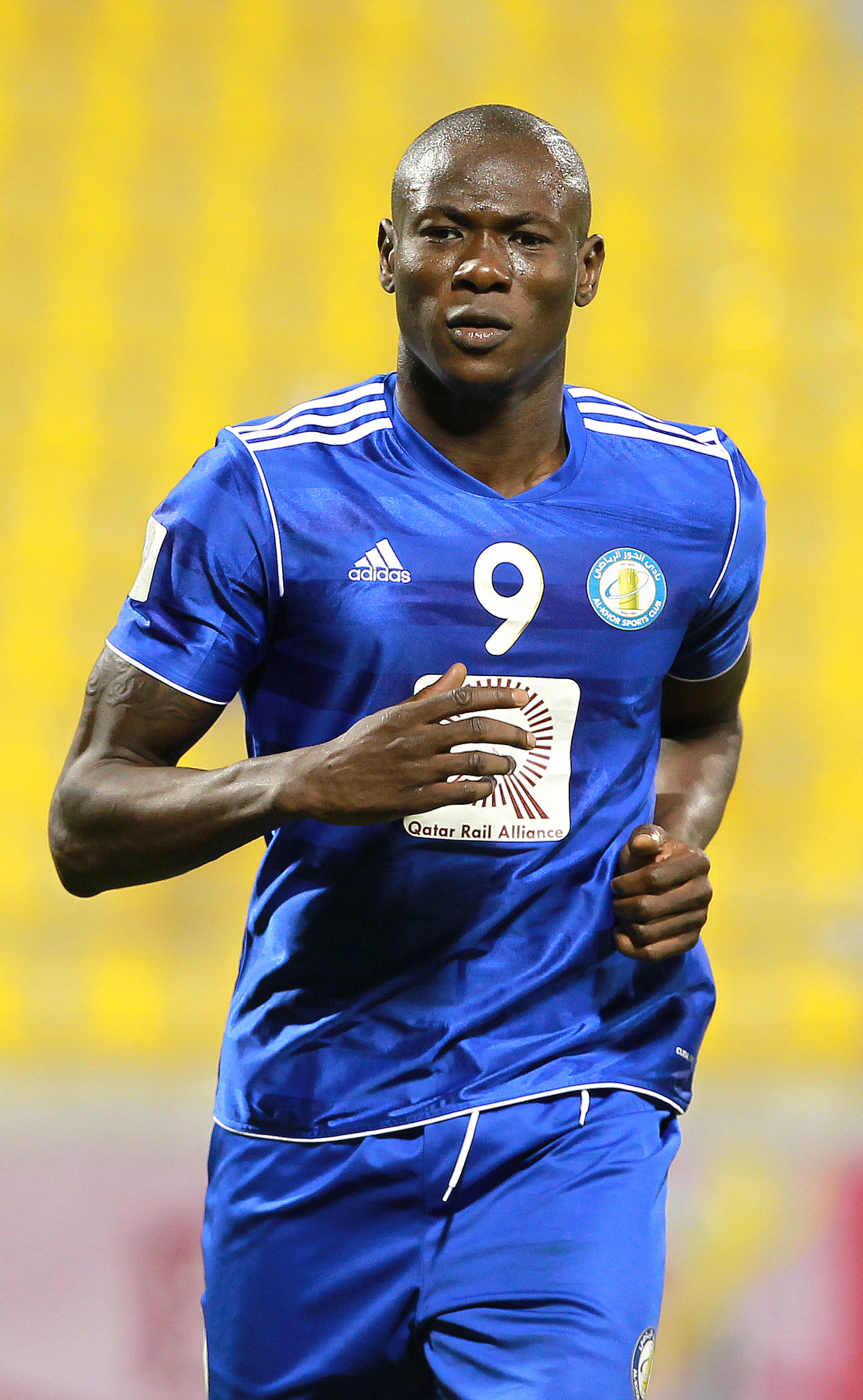
Moumouni Dagano has the most goals for Burkina Faso with 34.

| Rank | Player | Goals | Caps | Ratio | Career |
|---|---|---|---|---|---|
| 1 | Moumouni Dagano | 34 | 83 | 0.41 | 1998–2013 |
| 2 | Aristide Bancé | 24 | 79 | 0.3 | 2003–2019 |
| 3 | **Bertrand Traoré** | 22 | 91 | 0.24 | 2011–present |
| 4 | Alain Traoré | 21 | 65 | 0.32 | 2006–2021 |
| 5 | Jonathan Pitroipa | 19 | 84 | 0.23 | 2006–2019 |
| 6 | **Lassina Traoré** | 15 | 34 | 0.44 | 2017–present |
| 7 | Mamadou Zongo | 13 | 30 | 0.43 | 1996–2013 |
| 7 | Préjuce Nakoulma | 13 | 53 | 0.25 | 2012–2019 |
| 9 | **Dango Ouattara** | 12 | 40 | 0.3 | 2021–present |
| 10 | Amadou Touré | 10 | 30 | 0.33 | 1998–2006 |
| 10 | Oumar Barro | 10 | 48 | 0.21 | 1996–2003 |

== Competitive record ==
=== FIFA World Cup ===
| FIFA World Cup record | | | | | | | | | Qualification record | | | | | |
| Year | Round | Position | Pld | W | D | L | GF | GA | Pld | W | D | L | GF | GA |
|---|---|---|---|---|---|---|---|---|---|---|---|---|---|---|
| 1930 to 1958 | Part of France | | | | | | | | Part of France | | | | | |
as Upper Volta
| (Chile) 1962 | Not a FIFA member | | | | | | | | Not a FIFA member | | | | | |
| 1966 to 1974 | Did not enter | | | | | | | | Did not enter | | | | | |
| (Argentina) 1978 | Did not qualify | | | | | | | | 4 | 1 | 2 | 1 | 4 | 4 |
| (Spain) 1982 | Did not enter | | | | | | | | Did not enter | | | | | |
as Burkina Faso
| (Mexico) 1986 | Did not enter | | | | | | | | Did not enter | | | | | |
| (Italy) 1990 | Did not qualify | | | | | | | | 2 | 1 | 0 | 1 | 2 | 3 |
| (United States) 1994 | Withdrew | | | | | | | | Withdrew | | | | | |
| (France) 1998 | Did not qualify | | | | | | | | 8 | 1 | 1 | 6 | 9 | 17 |
| (South Korea) (Japan) 2002 | Did not qualify | | | | | | | | 8 | 2 | 2 | 4 | 11 | 10 |
| (Germany) 2006 | Did not qualify | | | | | | | | 10 | 4 | 1 | 5 | 14 | 13 |
| (South Africa) 2010 | Did not qualify | | | | | | | | 12 | 9 | 1 | 2 | 24 | 16 |
| (Brazil) 2014 | Did not qualify | | | | | | | | 8 | 5 | 0 | 3 | 10 | 7 |
| (Russia) 2018 | Did not qualify | | | | | | | | 8 | 3 | 3 | 2 | 13 | 8 |
| (Qatar) 2022 | Did not qualify | | | | | | | | 6 | 3 | 3 | 0 | 12 | 4 |
| (Canada) (Mexico) (United States) 2026 | Did not qualify | | | | | | | | 10 | 6 | 3 | 1 | 23 | 8 |
| (Morocco) (Portugal) (Spain) 2030 | To be determined | | | | | | | | To be determined | | | | | |
| (Saudi Arabia) 2034 | To be determined | | | | | | | | To be determined | | | | | |
| Total | | 0/15 | | | | | | | 76 | 35 | 16 | 25 | 122 | 90 |

=== Africa Cup of Nations ===

2013 Africa Cup of Nations starting lineup

| Africa Cup of Nations record | | | | | | | | | Qualification record | | | | | |
| Year | Round | Position | Pld | W | D | L | GF | GA | Pld | W | D | L | GF | GA |
|---|---|---|---|---|---|---|---|---|---|---|---|---|---|---|
| (Sudan) 1957 | Part of France | | | | | | | | Part of France | | | | | |
| (United Arab Republic) 1959 | Part of France | | | | | | | | Part of France | | | | | |
| Played as Upper Volta | | | | | | | | | Player as Upper Volta | | | | | |
| (Ethiopia) 1962 | Not affiliated to CAF | | | | | | | | Not affiliated to CAF | | | | | |
| (Ghana) 1963 | Not affiliated to CAF | | | | | | | | Not affiliated to CAF | | | | | |
| (Tunisia) 1965 | Did not enter | | | | | | | | Did not enter | | | | | |
| (Ethiopia) 1968 | Did not qualify | | | | | | | | 4 | 0 | 0 | 4 | 2 | 10 |
| (Sudan) 1970 | Withdrew | | | | | | | | Withdrew | | | | | |
| (Cameroon) 1972 | Withdrew | | | | | | | | Withdrew | | | | | |
| (Egypt) 1974 | Did not qualify | | | | | | | | 2 | 0 | 0 | 2 | 1 | 9 |
| (Ethiopia) 1976 | Did not enter | | | | | | | | Did not enter | | | | | |
| (Ghana) 1978 | Group stage | 8th | 3 | 0 | 0 | 3 | 2 | 9 | 2 | 0 | 0 | 2 | 1 | 4 |
| (Nigeria) 1980 | Did not enter | | | | | | | | Did not enter | | | | | |
| (Libya) 1982 | Did not qualify | | | | | | | | 2 | 0 | 1 | 1 | 1 | 8 |
| Played as Burkina Faso | | | | | | | | | Played as Burkina Faso | | | | | |
| (Ivory Coast) 1984 | Did not enter | | | | | | | | Did not enter | | | | | |
| (Egypt) 1986 | Did not enter | | | | | | | | Did not enter | | | | | |
| (Morocco) 1988 | Did not enter | | | | | | | | Did not enter | | | | | |
| (Algeria) 1990 | Did not qualify | | | | | | | | 2 | 1 | 0 | 1 | 1 | 3 |
| (Senegal) 1992 | Did not qualify | | | | | | | | 8 | 4 | 1 | 3 | 10 | 13 |
| (Tunisia) 1994 | Withdrew | | | | | | | | Withdrew | | | | | |
| (South Africa) 1996 | Group stage | 15th | 3 | 0 | 0 | 3 | 3 | 9 | 4 | 1 | 3 | 0 | 5 | 4 |
| (Burkina Faso) 1998 | Fourth place | 4th | 6 | 2 | 2 | 2 | 8 | 9 | Qualified as hosts | | | | | |
| (Ghana) (Nigeria) 2000 | Group stage | 15th | 3 | 0 | 1 | 2 | 4 | 8 | 4 | 2 | 2 | 0 | 8 | 5 |
| (Mali) 2002 | Group stage | 13th | 3 | 0 | 1 | 2 | 2 | 4 | 8 | 4 | 3 | 1 | 7 | 3 |
| (Tunisia) 2004 | Group stage | 14th | 3 | 0 | 1 | 2 | 1 | 6 | 6 | 4 | 2 | 0 | 12 | 2 |
| (Egypt) 2006 | Did not qualify | | | | | | | | 10 | 4 | 1 | 5 | 14 | 13 |
| (Ghana) 2008 | Did not qualify | | | | | | | | 6 | 1 | 1 | 4 | 5 | 12 |
| (Angola) 2010 | Group stage | 13th | 2 | 0 | 1 | 1 | 0 | 1 | 12 | 9 | 1 | 2 | 24 | 16 |
| (Equatorial Guinea) (Gabon) 2012 | Group stage | 15th | 3 | 0 | 0 | 3 | 2 | 6 | 4 | 3 | 1 | 0 | 12 | 3 |
| (South Africa) 2013 | Runners-up | 2nd | 6 | 2 | 3 | 1 | 7 | 3 | 2 | 1 | 0 | 1 | 2 | 3 |
| (Equatorial Guinea) 2015 | Group stage | 16th | 3 | 0 | 1 | 2 | 1 | 4 | 6 | 3 | 2 | 1 | 8 | 4 |
| (Gabon) 2017 | Third place | 3rd | 6 | 3 | 3 | 0 | 8 | 3 | 6 | 4 | 1 | 1 | 6 | 2 |
| (Egypt) 2019 | Did not qualify | | | | | | | | 6 | 3 | 1 | 2 | 8 | 5 |
| (Cameroon) 2021 | Fourth place | 4th | 7 | 2 | 3 | 2 | 9 | 10 | 6 | 3 | 3 | 0 | 6 | 2 |
| (Ivory Coast) 2023 | Round of 16 | 13th | 4 | 1 | 1 | 2 | 4 | 6 | 6 | 3 | 2 | 1 | 8 | 5 |
| (Morocco) 2025 | Round of 16 | 11th | 4 | 2 | 0 | 2 | 4 | 5 | 6 | 3 | 1 | 2 | 10 | 7 |
| (Kenya) (Tanzania) (Uganda) 2027 | To be determined | | | | | | | | To be determined | | | | | |
| Total | Runners-up | 14/35 | 56 | 12 | 17 | 27 | 55 | 83 | 112 | 53 | 26 | 33 | 151 | 133 |

=== African Nations Championship ===
African Nations Championship record
Appearances: 3
| Year | Round | Position | Pld | W | D | L | GF | GA |
|---|---|---|---|---|---|---|---|---|
| (Ivory Coast) 2009 | Did not qualify | | | | | | | |
| (Sudan) 2011 | Did not qualify | | | | | | | |
| (South Africa) 2014 | Group stage | 13th | 3 | 0 | 1 | 2 | 2 | 4 |
| (Rwanda) 2016 | Did not qualify | | | | | | | |
| (Morocco) 2018 | Group stage | 11th | 3 | 0 | 2 | 1 | 1 | 3 |
| (Cameroon) 2020 | Group stage | 9th | 3 | 1 | 1 | 1 | 3 | 2 |
| (Algeria) 2022 | Did not qualify | | | | | | | |
| (Kenya) 2024 | To be determined | | | | | | | |
| Total | Group stage | 3/8 | 9 | 1 | 4 | 4 | 6 | 9 |

=== African Games ===
African Games record
| Year | Result | Pld | W | D | L | GF | GA |
|---|---|---|---|---|---|---|---|
| (Nigeria) 1973 | 8th | 3 | 0 | 0 | 3 | 4 | 10 |
| Total | 1/4 | | | | | | |

=== West African Nations Cup ===
West African Nations Cup record
| Year | Round | Position | Pld | W | D* | L | GF | GA |
|---|---|---|---|---|---|---|---|---|
| (Benin) 1982 | Did not enter | | | | | | | |
| (Ivory Coast) 1983 | Did not enter | | | | | | | |
| (Burkina Faso) 1984 | Fourth place | 4th | 5 | 1 | 3 | 1 | 6 | 7 |
| (Ghana) 1986 | Fourth place | 4th | 6 | 1 | 1 | 4 | 2 | 7 |
| (Liberia) 1987 | Group stage | 5th | 3 | 1 | 0 | 2 | 3 | 4 |
| Total | Fourth place | 3/5 | 14 | 3 | 4 | 7 | 11 | 18 |

=== WAFU Nations Cup ===
WAFU Nations Cup record
| Year | Round | Position | Pld | W | D* | L | GF | GA |
|---|---|---|---|---|---|---|---|---|
| (Nigeria) 2010 | Fourth place | 4th | 5 | 2 | 0 | 3 | 9 | 8 |
| (Nigeria) 2011 | Did not enter | | | | | | | |
| (Ghana) 2013 | Group stage | 5th | 3 | 0 | 1 | 2 | 3 | 5 |
| Total | Fourth place | 2/3 | 8 | 2 | 1 | 5 | 12 | 13 |

== Honours ==
=== Continental ===
- Africa Cup of Nations
  - (silver) Runners-up (1): 2013
  - (bronze) Third place (1): 2017

=== Regional ===
- UEMOA Tournament
  - (gold) Champions (1): 2013
- West African Nations Cup
  - (bronze) Third place (1): 1982

=== Friendly ===
- Mapinduzi Cup
  - (silver) Runners-up (1): 2025

=== Summary ===
| Competition | 1st place, gold medalist(s) | 2nd place, silver medalist(s) | 3rd place, bronze medalist(s) | Total |
|---|---|---|---|---|
| CAF African Cup of Nations | 0 | 1 | 1 | 2 |
| Total | 0 | 1 | 1 | 2 |
