= 1987 West African Nations Cup =

Tournament details
- Host country: Liberia
- Dates: 30 January—8 February
- Teams: 8

Final positions
- Champions: Ghana (5th title)
- Runners-up: Liberia
- Third place: Nigeria

Tournament statistics
- Matches played: 16
- Goals scored: 40 (2.5 per match)

The 1987 West African Nations Cup was the 5th and last edition of the tournament. It was held in Liberia between 30 January and 8 February. All matches were played in the capital Monrovia. Ghana won its fifth successive title.

After this edition between 1988–2000, the tournament was never played again. It was unsuccessfully revived in 2001 as the WAFU Nations Cup. However, it was not clear whether this was a proper successor of the West African Nations Cup,

== Group 1 ==
Team	Pts	Pld	W	D	L	GF	GA	GD
Liberia	5	3	2	1	0	4	0	+4
Nigeria	3	3	1	1	1	4	3	+1
Burkina Faso	2	3	1	0	2	3	4	-2
Benin	2	3	0	2	1	3	7	-1

Jan 30, 1987	Liberia	2–0	Nigeria
Feb 1, 1987	Liberia	2–0	Burkina Faso
Feb 1, 1987	Benin	1–1	Nigeria
Feb 3, 1987	Liberia	0–0	Benin
Feb 3, 1987	Nigeria	3–0	Burkina Faso
Feb 5, 1987	Burkina Faso	3–2	Benin

== Group 2 ==
Team	Pts	Pld	W	D	L	GF	GA	GD
Ghana	6	3	3	0	0	9	0	+9
Togo	4	3	2	0	1	2	3	-1
Ivory Coast	2	3	1	0	2	1	3	-2
Niger	0	3	0	0	3	0	6	-6

Jan 31, 1987	Ghana	2–0	Ivory Coast
Jan 31, 1987	Togo	1–0	Niger
Feb 2, 1987	Ghana	4–0	Niger
Feb 2, 1987	Togo	1–0	Ivory Coast
Feb 4, 1987	Ghana	3–0	Togo
Feb 4, 1987	Ivory Coast	1–0	Niger

== Knockout stages ==
Semi-finals
Feb 6 - Monrovia
Ghana	3
Nigeria	1
Feb 6 - Monrovia
Liberia	3
Togo	0

Final
Feb 8 - Monrovia
Liberia	1
Ghana	2
Third place
Feb 8 - Monrovia
Nigeria	3
Togo	1

== Result ==
1987 West African Nations Cup winners

Ghana
Fifth title
