= 90 Minutes for Mandela =

Charity football match

90 Minutes for Mandela was a charity football match held on 18 July 2007 in Cape Town, South Africa, to mark the 89th birthday of Nelson Mandela. The match ended in a 3–3 draw between an African XI and a Rest of the World XI. Africa played in an all-white strip, while the Rest of the World team played in an all-black strip. A few hours before the game, Sepp Blatter granted honorary membership of FIFA to the Makana Football Association, a football league set up by prisoners on Robben Island, where Mandela was imprisoned.

Mandela did not attend the match, he did though, send a message via video. Proceeds of the match went to programmes supported by the Nelson Mandela Foundation. Before the game an official match shirt was presented to Mandela with the number 89 on the reverse.

== Match result ==
The match, played in front of a crowd of 35,412 ended in a 3–3 draw between an African XI and a Rest of the World XI. Iván Zamorano, Ruud Gullit and Julen Guerrero scored for the Rest of the World with Abedi Pele and Hossam Hassan (2) scoring for the Africans.

== Squads ==
Pelé kicked the match off ceremonially. Over 50 players were selected to appear in the match, to represent the two teams. Though the final line up for each team is as per below.

=== Africa XI ===
The Africa XI was coached by Jean Manga-Onguene of Cameroon and Jomo Sono of South Africa.

Note: Flags indicate national team as defined under FIFA eligibility rules; some limited exceptions apply. Players may hold more than one non-FIFA nationality.

No.	Pos.	Nation	Player
1	GK	CMR	Jacques Songo'o
2	DF	NGA	Austin Eguavoen
3	DF	CMR	Stephen Tataw
4	DF	NGA	Stephen Keshi
6	FW	RSA	Phil Masinga
7	FW	CMR	François Omam-Biyik
8	FW	ALG	Rabah Madjer
9	FW	CMR	Samuel Eto'o
10	FW	GHA	Abedi Pele

No.	Pos.	Nation	Player
11	FW	ZAM	Kalusha Bwalya
12	GK	RSA	Andre Arendse
14	FW	NGA	Daniel Amokachi
15	DF	RSA	Doctor Khumalo
16	FW	NGA	Samson Siasia
17	MF	TUN	Zoubeir Baya
20	FW	LBR	George Weah
21	FW	COD	Lomana LuaLua
22	FW	EGY	Hossam Hassan

=== Rest of the World XI ===
The Rest of the World XI was coached by Roy Hodgson of England and Claude Le Roy of France.

Note: Flags indicate national team as defined under FIFA eligibility rules; some limited exceptions apply. Players may hold more than one non-FIFA nationality.

No.	Pos.	Nation	Player
1	GK	ESP	Andoni Zubizarreta
4	DF	ENG	Gary Mabbutt
5	DF	RSA	Mark Fish
6	MF	FRA	Christian Karembeu
7	FW	NZL	Wynton Rufer
8	MF	ESP	Julen Guerrero
9	FW	ESP	Emilio Butragueño
11	FW	IRN	Ali Daei

No.	Pos.	Nation	Player
13	FW	CHI	Iván Zamorano
14	FW	CMR	Patrick M'Boma
15	FW	CIV	Youssouf Falikou Fofana
16	FW	KOR	Kim Joo-Sung
18	MF	BRA	Leonardo Araújo
19	DF	RSA	Lucas Radebe
20	MF	NED	Ruud Gullit
22	FW	SUI	Stéphane Chapuisat

== Nelson Mandela Farewell Game ==
FIFA organised a similar all-star match on 17 August 1999 to honour Mandela when he stepped down as South African president, which was held at Ellis Park in Johannesburg in front of a crowd of 40,000 between a Mandela XI, which featured, among others, Lucas Radebe, Mark Fish, Celestine Babayaro, Samuel Kuffour, Kalusha Bwalya, Hossam Hassan, Benni McCarthy, Nwankwo Kanu, Titi Camara and Shabani Nonda and a FIFA World XI which included, among others, Jorge Campos, Taribo West, Rigobert Song, Branco, Dunga, Thomas Häßler, Mustapha Hadji, Luis Hernández, Viorel Moldovan, Murat Yakin, Lubomir Moravcik, Abedi Pele and Jean-Pierre Papin. That particular match ended 2–2.
