= Europe XI v Africa XI (1997) =

Europe XI	Africa XI
UEFA	CAF
1	2
- Date: 29 January 1997
- Venue: Estádio da Luz, Lisbon, Portugal
- Referee: Vitor Melo Pereira (Portugal)
- Attendance: 8,000

Europe XI v Africa XI (1997) was a friendly football match that took place on 29 January 1997 at the Estádio da Luz in Lisbon, Portugal, between a European select side and an African select side. The match was jointly organized by UEFA and CAF as part of the European Year against Racism. The African XI won 2–1 with goals from Abedi Pele and Mustapha Hadji.

== Background ==
The European Union's "Year Against Racism" started with an exhibition match between All-Star teams representing Europe and Africa. The following day, UEFA, European football's ruling body, and CAF, its African counterpart, held their first joint-executive meeting in Lisbon where they signed a friendship agreement which ended years of barely concealed hostility. The agreement obliged the two confederations to "undertake extensive co-operation in all football-related matters as partners with equal rights".

The European side, selected by Rinus Michels and Berti Vogts, had a 17-man squad which contained four players who were among Germany's Euro 96 winners, including their captain, Jürgen Klinsmann, as well as the Dutch twin brothers Ronald and Frank de Boer, and Zvonimir Boban, Milan's Croat midfielder. While many of the world's top players were involved, there were no English players in the European squad as the Premier League had a packed schedule that night. No players from eastern European clubs were involved either, because of their winter break. The African All-Stars 18-man squad, selected by Rabah Madjer and Mawade Wade, included four of Nigeria's Olympic gold-medal winning squad and two of South Africa's African championship winning squad.

Selecting Benfica's Stadium of Light to host the event was a deliberate choice serving to recognise the enormous contribution that Benfica's greatest player, Eusébio, had made to European football. Benfica had players in both squads, with Portugal's João Pinto in the European camp and Paulo António of Angola, in the African. Because the intention was to give everybody a game, both teams were allowed to use two re-substitutions - the sending back on a player previously substituted - in the event of second-half injuries. As a continuing part of the anti-racism initiative, the under-17 Meridian Cup, which comprises four nations from each continent, kicked off two days later.

== Match ==
29 January 1997

Europe XI	1 – 2	Africa XI
Guérin 43'		Pele 14'; Hadji 78'

Estádio da Luz, Lisbon
Attendance: 8,000
Referee: Vítor Pereira (Portugal)

EUROPE XI:
GK	20	(Netherlands) Edwin van der Sar	(substituted off) 60'
SW	16	(Germany) Matthias Sammer (c)	(substituted off) 46'
CB	4	(Netherlands) Frank de Boer
CB	11	(Germany) Jürgen Kohler
DM	7	(France) Vincent Guérin
DM	14	(Portugal) Paulinho Santos	(substituted off) 46'
RM	2	(Croatia) Zvonimir Boban
AM	15	(Portugal) Rui Costa	(substituted off) 46'
LM	5	(Netherlands) Ronald de Boer
SS	9	(Portugal) João Pinto	(substituted off) 46'
CF	10	(Germany) Jürgen Klinsmann	(substituted off) 46'
Substitutions:
GK	1	(Russia) Stanislav Cherchesov	(substituted on) 60'
DF	6	(Switzerland) Stéphane Henchoz	(substituted on) 46'
MF	12	(Germany) Andreas Möller	(substituted on) 46'
MF	13	(Czech Republic) Pavel Nedvěd	(substituted on) 46'
FW	3	(Italy) Pierluigi Casiraghi	(substituted on) 46'
FW	6	(Portugal) Domingos Paciência	(substituted on) 46'
Manager:
(Germany) Berti Vogts (Netherlands) Rinus Michels

AFRICA XI:
GK	20	(South Africa) Andre Arendse	(substituted off) 46'
CB	2	(Ghana) Frank Amankwah
CB	16	(Nigeria) Taribo West
CB	5	(South Africa) Mark Fish
RM	7	(Nigeria) Sunday Oliseh
CM	12	(Egypt) Radwan Yasser	(substituted off) 65'
CM	14	(Algeria) Moussa Saïb	(substituted off) 58'
LM	10	(Ghana) Abedi Pele (c)
RF	3	(Nigeria) Tijani Babangida	(substituted off) 58'
CF	8	(Ivory Coast) Ahmed Ouattara
LF	9	(Angola) Paulão	(substituted off) 64'
Substitutions:
GK	1	(Nigeria) Abiodun Baruwa	(substituted on) 46'
MF	6	(Morocco) Mustapha Hadji	(substituted on) 58'
FW	4	(Mozambique) Chiquinho Conde	(substituted on) 64'
FW	11	(Angola) Quinzinho	(substituted on) 58'
FW	15	(Senegal) Souleyman Sané	(substituted on) 65'
Manager:
(Algeria) Rabah Madjer (Senegal) Mawade Wade

Assistant referees:
João Esteves (Portugal)
Carlos Matos (Portugal)
