= Sidiki Diarra =

Burkinabé footballer (1952–2014)

Personal information
- Date of birth: 6 January 1952
- Place of birth: Bobo-Dioulasso, Burkina Faso
- Date of death: 24 June 2014 (aged 62)
- Position: Goalkeeper

Senior career*
| Years | Team | Apps | (Gls) |
| 1968–1973 | JC Bobo Dioulasso | | |
| 1973–1975 | US FRAN | | |
| 1975–1981 | Silures Bobo-Dioulasso | | |

International career
| 1972–1978 | Upper Volta | | |

Managerial career
- 2001–2002: Burkina Faso
- 2006–2007: Burkina Faso
- * Club domestic league appearances and goals

Sidiki Diarra (6 January 1952 – 26 June 2014) was a former Burkinabé footballer, and football manager who coached the Burkina Faso national team.

== Death ==
Diarra died on 26 June 2014, after a long bout of illness with a left hemiplegia.
