= Heinz-Peter Überjahn =

German football manager

Peter Uberjahn
Personal information
- Full name: Heinz-Peter Uberjahn
- Date of birth: 13 November 1948 (age 77)
- Place of birth: Germany

Managerial career
- Years: Team
- 1980-1985: Niger
- 1985: Burkina Faso
- 1999: Namibia
- 2003: Namibia

Heinz-Peter Uberjahn (born 13 November 1948 in Germany) is a German football manager who last worked as head coach of the Namibia national football team.

== Career ==
Uberjahn managed the Niger national football team, and after that, he coached the Burkina Faso national football team. In 1999, he was appointed head coach of the Namibia national football team, a position he held until 1999.
