= Kodjovi Mawuéna =

Togolese footballer and manager

Personal information
- Date of birth: 31 December 1959 (age 66)
- Place of birth: Tsévié, Togo
- Position: Defender

International career
Years	Team	Apps	(Gls)
1980–1986	Togo		

Managerial career
- –: OC Agaza
- 2000: Togo (caretaker)
- –: Dynamic Togolais
- 2006: Togo (caretaker)
- –: Dynamic Togolais

Kodjovi Mawuéna (born 31 December 1959) is a Togolese former football player and manager. He played for the Togo national team and was also caretaking manager of Togo.

== Club career ==
Born in Tsévié, Mawuéna played club football in the local leagues.

== International career ==
Mawuéna made appearances for the Togo national team, including one FIFA World Cup qualifying match. He captained Togo at the 1984 African Cup of Nations finals.

== Career as manager ==
After retiring from playing, Mawuéna became a manager. He led several local clubs, including OC Agaza. In 2004, he was named coach of the year while managing Dynamic Togolais.

Mawuéna was an assistant coach for the Togo national football teamTogo national team and became caretaker manager when Gottlieb Göller walked out during the 2000 African Cup of Nations finals. He was also named a caretaker manager for Togo during the 2006 World Cup finals when Otto Pfister and Piet Hamberg quit their posts.
