= Paulo Duarte (footballer) =

Portuguese football manager and former player

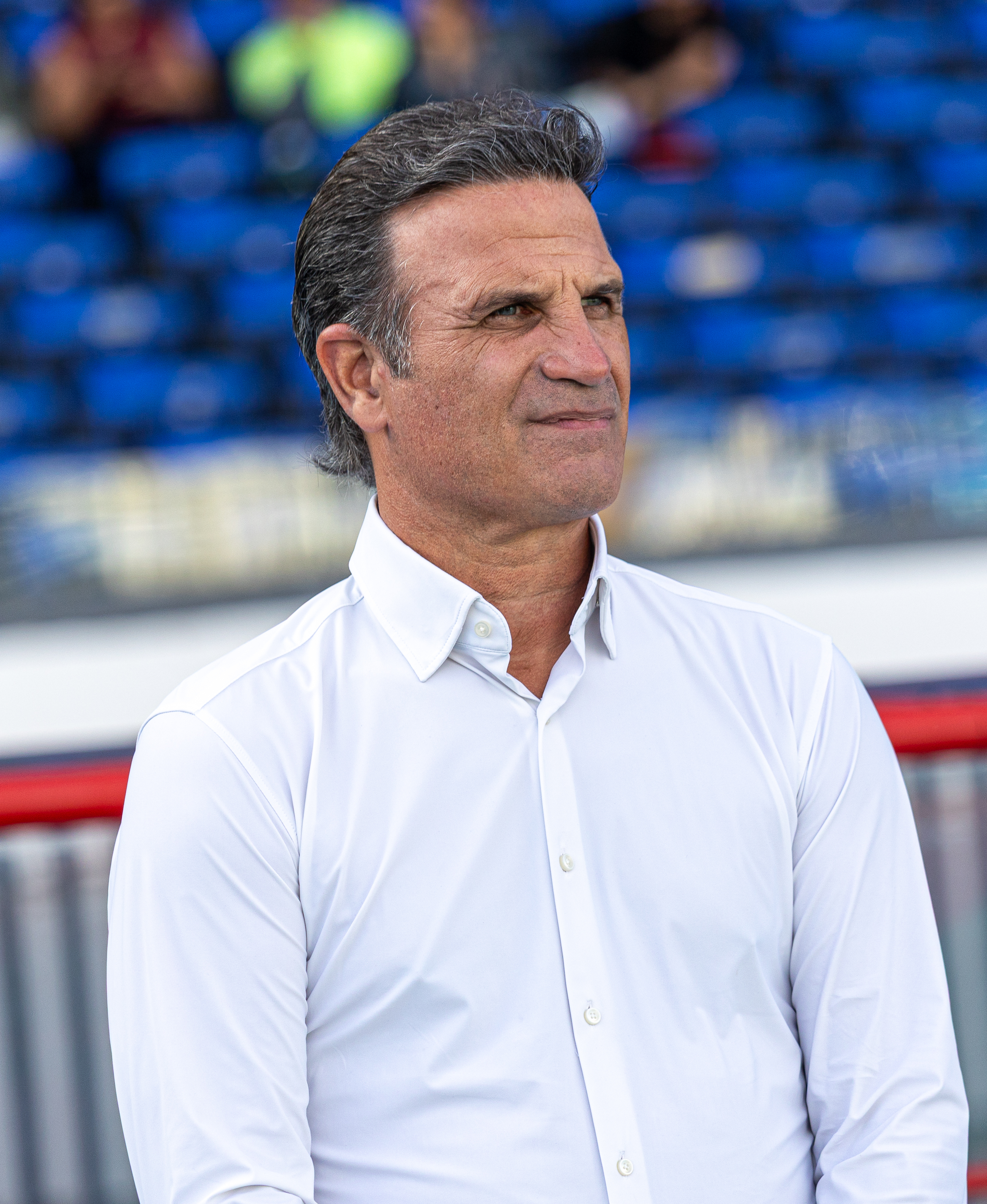
- Duarte as head coach of Guinea in 2025

Personal information
- Full name: Paulo Jorge Rebelo Duarte
- Date of birth: 6 April 1969 (age 57)
- Place of birth: Massarelos, Portugal
- Height: 1.82 m (6 ft 0 in)
- Position: Centre-back

Team information
- Current team: Guinea (manager)

Youth career
- 1982–1987: Boavista

Senior career*
Years	Team	Apps	(Gls)
1987–1988	União Coimbra	26	(0)
1988–1991	União Leiria	90	(7)
1991–1993	Salgueiros	42	(2)
1993–1995	Marítimo	42	(2)
1995–2004	União Leiria	155	(4)
Total		355	(15)

Managerial career
- 2004–2006: União Leiria (assistant)
- 2006–2007: União Leiria
- 2008–2012: Burkina Faso
- 2009: Le Mans
- 2012–2013: Gabon
- 2015: Sfaxien
- 2015–2019: Burkina Faso
- 2020–2021: 1º de Agosto
- 2021–2024: Togo
- 2024: Al-Kholood
- 2025–: Guinea
Medal record
Men's football
Representing Burkina Faso (as manager)
Africa Cup of Nations
Bronze medal – third place	2017
- * Club domestic league appearances and goals

Paulo Jorge Rebelo Duarte (born 6 April 1969) is a Portuguese former professional footballer who played as a central defender. He is currently manager of the Guinea national team.

In a 17-year senior career, he amassed Primeira Liga totals of 238 matches and eight goals over 12 seasons, representing mainly União de Leiria. He became a manager in 2006, also working with that club and later being in charge of the Burkina Faso, Gabon, Togo and Guinea national teams.

== Playing career ==
Duarte was born in Massarelos, Porto District. After playing youth football for Boavista and starting out as a senior at União de Coimbra, he signed for União de Leiria in 1988, also in the Segunda Liga.

Duarte then spent two years apiece with Salgueiros and Marítimo, making his Primeira Liga debut with the former and totalling 84 league games for those clubs. Subsequently, he returned to Leiria who now competed in the Portuguese top flight, retiring almost one decade later aged 35 and being first-choice in four of those seasons (in 2001–02, as the team qualified for the UEFA Intertoto Cup, he was managed by a young José Mourinho).

== Coaching career ==
After his retirement, Duarte immediately began his managerial career, staying with his last club Leiria as an assistant. In the tenth round of 2006–07's top division, he was named coach of the first team after replacing Domingos Paciência, eventually helping them to finish seventh.

In late 2007, Duarte left Leiria and, a couple of months later, was appointed manager of Burkina Faso. On 2 June 2009, however, he was signed by France's Le Mans on a two-year contract while still working with the national side.

Duarte was fired by Le Mans on 8 December 2009, becoming the first Ligue 1 manager casualty in the season, but still was on the bench for Burkina Faso's 2010 Africa Cup of Nations campaign, exiting in the group stage after one draw and one loss (the team was in Togo's group). On 17 February 2012, following three matches and as many losses at the 2012 Africa Cup of Nations, he was dismissed.

On 29 April 2012, Duarte was appointed interim coach of the Gabon national team. He was sacked on 23 September of the following year, after failing to qualify the country for both the 2013 Africa Cup of Nations and the 2014 FIFA World Cup.

In late December 2015, after a brief club spell with Tunisia's Sfaxien, Duarte was again named manager of Burkina Faso. He led the latter to the third place at the 2017 Africa Cup of Nations, after a 1–0 win against Ghana in Port-Gentil.

On 24 July 2019, as the team did not make it to the 2019 Africa Cup of Nations finals, the Burkinabé Football Federation decided to terminate Duarte's contract. In September 2020, he was announced as the new head coach of Angolan side 1º de Agosto.

Duarte became manager of Togo in May 2021, following the departure of Claude Le Roy. As a result of his commitments to 1º de Agosto, the deal was only made effective in August, with Jonas Komla acting as caretaker until his arrival.

Duarte returned to club duties in the 2024–25 season, being appointed at Al-Kholood who had just been promoted to the Saudi Pro League. He was dismissed after seven games.

On 11 August 2025, Duarte became head coach of the Guinea national team, replacing Michel Dussuyer.

=== Player eligibility controversy ===
Duarte selected players to play for the Burkina Faso national team who he believed were eligible to play for the nation after they married Burkinabé women. Namibia complained about the fielding of Cameroonian Herve Xavier Zengue in two 2012 AFCON qualifying games, stating that the player was not eligible under FIFA's statutes.

Duarte also chose to play Zengue after the complaint was received by CAF, fielding him alongside Ghanaian-born Nii Plange in a 3–0 loss with South Africa in an August 2011 friendly.
