= 1986 West African Nations Cup =

Tournament details
- Host country: Ghana
- Dates: 23 February–2 March
- Teams: 5

Final positions
- Champions: Ghana (4th title)
- Runners-up: Togo
- Third place: Niger

Tournament statistics
- Matches played: 14
- Goals scored: 41 (2.93 per match)

The 1986 West African Nations Cup was the fourth edition of the tournament. It was held in Ghana between 23 February and 2 March. The title was won by Ghana.

== Group stage ==
Team	Pts	Pld	W	D	L	GF	GA	GD
Ghana	7	4	3	1	0	9	2	+7
Togo	5	4	2	1	1	5	5	0
Burkina Faso	3	4	1	1	2	1	3	-2
Niger	3	4	1	1	2	3	6	-3
Liberia	2	4	1	0	3	3	5	-2

Feb 23, 1986	Liberia	0–1	Burkina Faso
Feb 24, 1986	Ghana	2–0	Niger
Feb 24, 1986	Togo	1–0	Burkina Faso
Feb 25, 1986	Ghana	2–2	Togo
Feb 25, 1986	Liberia	3–0	Niger
Feb 26, 1986	Ghana	3–0	Liberia
Feb 26, 1986	Burkina Faso	0–0	Niger
Feb 27, 1986	Ghana	2–0	Burkina Faso
Feb 27, 1986	Togo	1–0	Liberia
Feb 28, 1986	Togo	1–3	Niger

== Knockout stages ==
Semi-finals
March 1, 1986 - Accra
Ghana	2
Burkina Faso	0
March 1, 1986 - Accra
Togo	3
Niger	1

Final
March 2, 1986 - Accra
Ghana	1
Togo	0
Third place
March 2, 1986 - Accra
Niger	2
Burkina Faso	1

== Result ==
1986 West African Nations Cup winners

Ghana
Fourth title
