= 1982 West African Nations Cup =

Tournament details
- Host country: Benin
- Dates: 13—23 February
- Teams: 7

Final positions
- Champions: Ghana (1st title)
- Runners-up: Togo
- Third place: Upper Volta

Tournament statistics
- Matches played: 16
- Goals scored: 44 (2.75 per match)

The first edition of the West African Nations Cup was held in Benin between 13 February and 23 February 1982. The title was won by Ghana.

== Group 1 ==
| Team | Pts | Pld | W | D | L | GF | GA | GD |
|---|---|---|---|---|---|---|---|---|
| Ghana | 4 | 3 | 1 | 2 | 0 | 11 | 7 | +4 |
| Ivory Coast | 3 | 3 | 0 | 3 | 0 | 9 | 9 | 0 |
| Niger | 3 | 3 | 0 | 3 | 0 | 5 | 5 | 0 |
| Benin | 2 | 3 | 0 | 2 | 1 | 4 | 8 | -4 |

Group matches

February 13, 1982

| Benin | 0 – 4 | Ghana |

February 15, 1982

| Ghana | 5 – 5 | Ivory Coast |

February 15, 1982

| Benin | 2 – 2 | Niger |

February 17, 1982

| Ghana | 2 – 2 | Niger |

February 17, 1982

| Benin | 3 – 3 | Ivory Coast |

February 19, 1982

| Ivory Coast | 1 – 1 | Niger |

== Group 2 ==
| Team | Pts | Pld | W | D | L | GF | GA | GD |
|---|---|---|---|---|---|---|---|---|
| Togo | 4 | 2 | 2 | 0 | 0 | 3 | 1 | +2 |
| Upper Volta | 4 | 2 | 1 | 0 | 1 | 3 | 3 | 0 |
| Liberia | 0 | 2 | 0 | 0 | 2 | 1 | 3 | -2 |
| Nigeria | Withdrew | | | | | | | |

Group matches

February 13, 1982

| Togo | 1 – 0 | Liberia |

February 15, 1982

| Upper Volta | 2 – 1 | Liberia |

February 17, 1982

| Togo | 2 – 2 | Upper Volta |

== Knockout stages ==
Semi-finals
Feb 19 - Cotonou
Ghana | 1
Upper Volta | 0
Feb 21 - Cotonou
Togo (pen.) | 1 (5)
Ivory Coast | 1 (3)

Final
Feb 23 - Cotonou
Togo | 1
Ghana | 2
Third place
Feb 22 - Cotonou
Upper Volta (pen.) | 1
Ivory Coast | 1

== Result ==
1982 West African Nations Cup winners

Ghana
First title
