= AS Olympique de Messira =

Malian football club

- Full name: AS Olympique de Messira
- Ground: Stade Modibo Keïta; Bamako, Mali
- Capacity: 35,000
- League: Malien Première Division
- 2013–14: 12th

AS Olympique de Messira is a Malian football club based in Bamako. They play in the Malien Première Division.
