= Tchakala Tchanilé =

Togolese footballer and coach

Personal information
- Date of birth: 30 March 1969 (age 57)
- Place of birth: Lomé, Togo
- Position: Midfielder

Senior career*
Years	Team	Apps	(Gls)
1992–1993	SG Bergmann-Borsig	6	(0)

International career
- Togo

Managerial career
- Maranatha
- Dyto
- JST Niamey
- 2014–2015: Togo
- * Club domestic league appearances and goals

Tchakala Tchanilé (born 30 March 1969) is a Togolese football coach and former player who managed the Togo national team.

== Playing career ==
Tchanilé played in Germany between 1992 and 1995.

He represented Togo at senior international level, appearing in FIFA World Cup qualifying matches.

== Coaching career ==
Tchanilé earned his coaching badges while living in Germany.

He coached a number of club sides, including Maranatha and Dyto (both of Togo), as well as Nigerien team JST Niamey.

He was appointed as the head coach of Togo in June 2014 on a six-month contract, succeeding Frenchman Didier Six, whom he had previously assisted in the role.

== Personal life ==
He is the younger brother of Bana Tchanilé.
