= West African Nations Cup =

Former football championship

The West African Nations Cup, also known as CSSA Nations Cup or "Zone 3" Championship, was a football championship held from 1982 to 1987 (not in 1985), but discontinued. Ghana won all editions, and indeed never lost a single match among the 25 they played. The tournament was unsuccessfully revived in 2001 as WAFU Championship; in 2005 a "WAFU Laurent Gbagbo West African Unity Cup" was organised between four of the better teams of the region, apparently as an invitational tournament so not a proper successor of the tournament of the eighties.

The Conseil supérieur du sport en Afrique (CSSA) (English: Supreme Council for Sports in Africa (SCSA)) was established in July 1965 in Brazzaville as the Comité pérmanent du sport Africain (CPSA). Its present title was adopted in Bamako on 14 December 1966. Since 3 July 1977, the CSSA has been functioning as a specialised agency of the Organisation of African Unity and has its headquarters in Yaoundé, Cameroon.

== West African Nations Cup Record ==
| Year | Host | Final | | | Third place match | | |
| Year | Host | Champion | Score | Second place | Third place | Score | Fourth place |
|---|---|---|---|---|---|---|---|
| 1982; Details | Benin | Ghana | 2–1 | Togo | Burkina Faso | 1–1 | Ivory Coast |
| 1983; Details | Ivory Coast | Ghana | 3–1 | Togo | Ivory Coast | 2–1 | Liberia |
| 1984; Details | Burkina Faso | Ghana | 1–1 | Togo | Ivory Coast | 2–0 | Burkina Faso |
| 1986; Details | Ghana | Ghana | 1–0 | Togo | Niger | 2–1 | Burkina Faso |
| 1987; Details | Liberia | Ghana | 2–1 | Liberia | Nigeria | 3–1 | Togo |

=== Most West African Nations Cup wins ===
| Wins | Nation | Year(s) |
|---|---|---|
| 5 times | Ghana | 1982, 1983, 1984, 1986, 1987 |

=== Statistics ===
| Team | Pld | W | D | L | GF | GA | GD |
|---|---|---|---|---|---|---|---|
| Ghana | 28 | 18 | 7 | 0 | 56 | 19 | +37 |
| Togo | 24 | 9 | 7 | 8 | 29 | 32 | −3 |
| Ivory Coast | 17 | 5 | 8 | 4 | 24 | 23 | +1 |
| Nigeria | 10 | 6 | 2 | 2 | 8 | 7 | +1 |
| Burkina Faso | 18 | 4 | 5 | 9 | 15 | 26 | −11 |
| Liberia | 15 | 4 | 2 | 9 | 13 | 17 | −4 |
| Niger | 12 | 2 | 3 | 7 | 9 | 21 | −12 |
| Benin | 10 | 1 | 3 | 6 | 11 | 20 | −9 |
