= 1984 West African Nations Cup =

Tournament details
- Host country: Burkina Faso
- Dates: 11–28 November
- Teams: 5

Final positions
- Champions: Ghana (3rd title)
- Runners-up: Togo
- Third place: Ivory Coast

Tournament statistics
- Matches played: 12
- Goals scored: 32 (2.67 per match)

The 1984 West African Nations Cup was the third edition of the tournament. It was held in Burkina Faso between 11–28 November. The title was won by Ghana.

== Group stage ==
Team	Pts	Pld	W	D	L	GF	GA	GD
Ghana	6	4	2	2	0	8	4	+4
Togo	5	4	1	3	0	6	4	+2
Burkina Faso	5	4	1	3	0	6	5	+1
Ivory Coast	4	4	1	2	1	5	6	-1
Benin	0	4	0	0	4	3	9	-6

Nov 17, 1984	Burkina Faso	1–1	Togo
Nov 18, 1984	Ghana	2–0	Ivory Coast
Nov 20, 1984	Burkina Faso	2–2	Ivory Coast
Nov 21, 1984	Ghana	2–2	Togo
Nov 22, 1984	Burkina Faso	2–1	Benin
Nov 23, 1984	Ivory Coast	1–1	Togo
Nov 24, 1984	Burkina Faso	1–1	Ghana
Nov 23, 1984	Ivory Coast	2–1	Benin
Nov 25, 1984	Togo	2–0	Benin
Nov 27, 1984	Ghana	3–1	Benin

== Third place play-off ==
November 28, 1984

Ivory Coast	2 – 0	Burkina Faso

Ouagadougou

== Final ==
November 28, 1984

Togo	1–1 (aet) (3-4 pen.)	Ghana
Souleymane 2'		John Bannerman 57'

Ouagadougou

== Result ==
1984 West African Nations Cup winners

Ghana
Third title
