= Bana Tchanilé =

Togolese football manager

Personal information
- Place of birth: Togo

Managerial career
- Years: Team
- 2000–2002: Togo
- 2006–2007: Niger

Bana Tchanilé, sometimes called Tchanilé Bana, (Note: Attributed to multiple sources) is a Togolese former football coach, he has been in charge of the Togo national football team between 2000 and 2002, and the Niger national football team between 2006 and 2007.

On 7 September 2010, Togo allegedly played Bahrain in a friendly losing the match 3–0. However, on 14 September, the Togo FA claimed that a fake team had played against Bahrain.

Bahrain's head coach Josef Hickersberger rated the match as a missed opportunity for his team to prepare for the West Asian Championships starting in September.

Togo's Sport Minister Christophe Tchao said to the Jeune Afrique magazine that nobody in Togo had "ever been informed of such a game". On 20 September 2010, it was revealed that Tchanilé was the culprit and the Togo FA have given him a three-year ban in addition to the two-year ban he got in July 2010 for taking Togo players to play a tournament in Egypt. The match fixing has been linked to Wilson Raj Perumal and the Singaporean match-fixing syndicate allegedly run by Tan Seet Eng.

He is the older brother of Tchakala Tchanilé.
