= Nwankwo =

Nwankwo is a given name and a surname. Notable people with the name include:

== Given name ==
- Nwankwo Kanu, OON (born 1976), Nigerian footballer
- Nwankwo Obiora (born 1991), Nigerian footballer
- Nwankwo Tochukwu (born 1986), Nigerian footballer

== Surname ==
- Arthur Nwankwo (1939–2020), Nigerian author, publisher and pro-democracy activist
- Ben Nwankwo (born 1965). Nigerian politician and public administrator
- Benneth Nwankwo (born 1995), Nigerian documentary photographer and film director
- Christopher Nwankwo (born 1941), Nigerian Senator representing Ebonyi North Senatorial District
- Christy Nwankwo (born 1968), Rivers State Judge
- Clement Nwankwo (born 1962), Nigerian lawyer and human rights activist
- Dozie Nwankwo (born 1975), Nigerian politician
- Fidelis Nwankwo, Nigerian politician
- Green Nwankwo, Nigerian scholar and traditional ruler
- Ike Nwankwo (born 1973), Nigerian-American basketball player
- James Chike Nwankwo (better known as DJ Virall; born 1989), Nigerian disc jockey
- Nkem Nwankwo (1936–2001), Nigerian novelist and poet
- Silas Nwankwo (born 2003), Nigerian professional footballer
- Simeon Nwankwo (born 1992), Nigerian footballer
