= 1983 West African Nations Cup =

Tournament details
- Host country: Ivory Coast
- Dates: September 25–October 2
- Teams: 4

Final positions
- Champions: Ghana (2nd title)
- Runners-up: Togo

Tournament statistics
- Matches played: 8
- Goals scored: 19 (2.38 per match)

The 1983 West African Nations Cup was the second edition of the tournament. It was held in Ivory Coast between September 25 and October 2. The title was won by Ghana.

== Group stage ==
Team	Pts	Pld	W	D	L	GF	GA	GD
Ghana	5	3	2	1	0	4	1	+3
Togo	3	3	1	1	1	5	4	+1
Ivory Coast	3	3	1	1	1	3	2	+1
Liberia	1	3	0	1	2	0	5	-5

Sep 25, 1983	Liberia	0–0	Ivory Coast
Sep 27, 1983	Ghana	1–1	Togo
Sep 28, 1983	Ghana	1–0	Liberia
Sep 28, 1983	Togo	0–3	Ivory Coast
Sep 30, 1983	Ghana	2–0	Ivory Coast
Sep 30, 1983	Togo	4–0	Liberia

== Third place play-off ==
October 2, 1983

Ivory Coast	2–1	Liberia

Abidjan

== Final ==
October 2, 1983

Togo	1–3	Ghana

Abidjan

== Result ==
1983 West African Nations Cup winners

Ghana
Second title
