= Togo national football team =

Men's association football team

Togo
- Nickname(s): Les Éperviers (The Sparrowhawks)
- Association: Fédération Togolaise de Football (FTF)
- Confederation: CAF (Africa)
- Sub-confederation: WAFU (West Africa)
- Head coach: Patrice Neveu
- Captain: Djené
- Most caps: Alaixys Romao (97)
- Top scorer: Emmanuel Adebayor (32)
- Home stadium: Stade de Kégué
- FIFA code: TOG
First colours	Second colours

FIFA ranking
- Current: 120 ▼1 (7 October 2026)
- Highest: 46 (August 2006)
- Lowest: 136 (April 2021)

First international
- (France) French Togoland 1–1 Gold Coast and Trans-Volta Togoland (French Togoland; 13 October 1956)

Biggest win
- Togo 6–0 Swaziland (Accra, Ghana; 11 November 2008); Togo 6–0 Mauritius (Lomé, Togo; 12 November 2017)

Biggest defeat
- Morocco 7–0 Togo (Morocco; 28 October 1979); Tunisia 7–0 Togo (Tunis, Tunisia; 7 January 2000)

World Cup
- Appearances: 1 (first in 2006)
- Best result: Group stage (2006)

Africa Cup of Nations
- Appearances: 8 (first in 1972)
- Best result: Quarter-finals (2013)

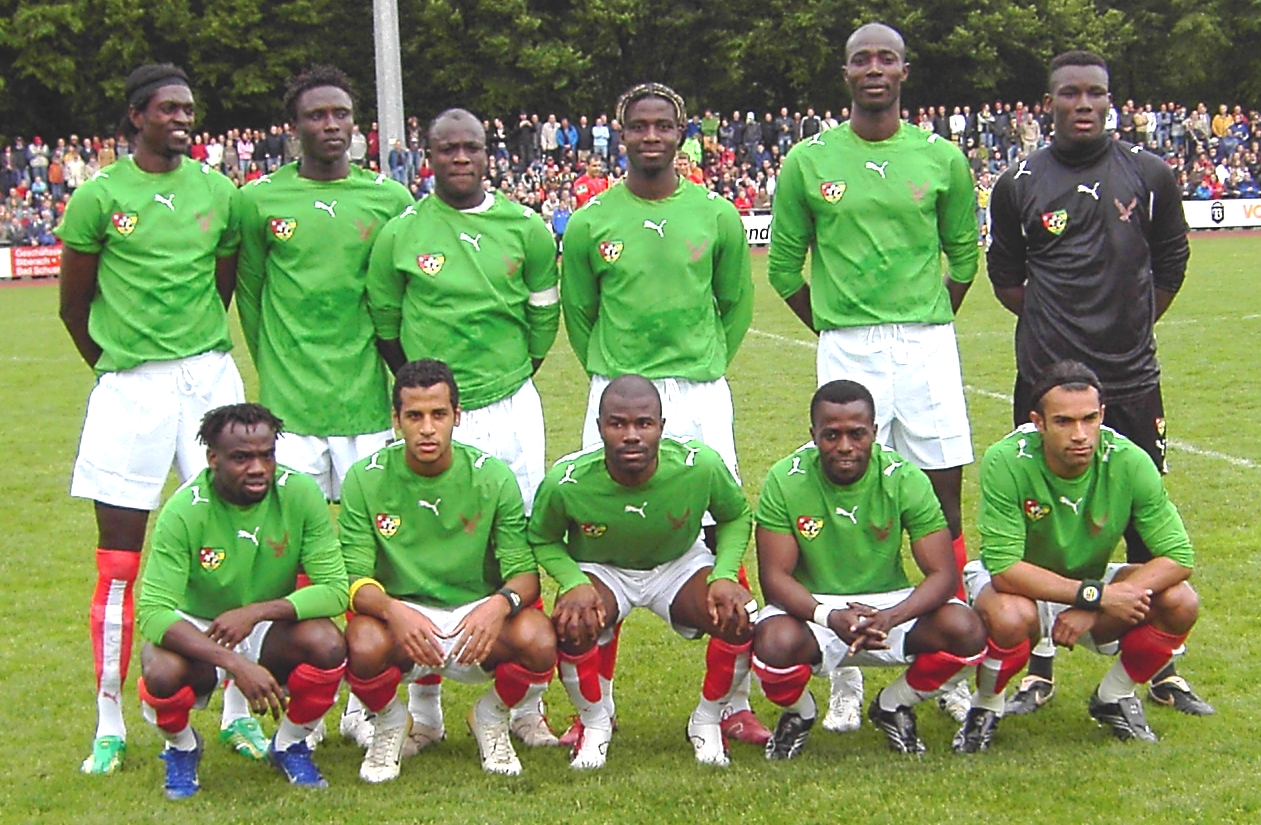
Members of the Togolese national football team before a warm-up match in Biberach/Riss a few days before the 2006 World Cup

The Togo national football team (French: Équipe nationale de football du Togo) represents Togo in international football and is controlled by the Togolese Football Federation. The national football team of Togo made their debut in the FIFA World Cup in 2006. Their team bus underwent a fatal attack in Angola prior to the 2010 Africa Cup of Nations. They withdrew and were subsequently banned from the following two tournaments by the Confederation of African Football (CAF). In 2013 for the first time in history, Togo reached the quarter-finals of the Africa Cup of Nations. The team represents both FIFA and the Confederation of African Football (CAF).

== History ==
They made their first FIFA World Cup appearance in their history in 2006, having been coached throughout the qualifying campaign by Stephen Keshi; German coach Otto Pfister managed the team at the finals, despite having resigned three days before their first match over a players' bonuses dispute, only to be persuaded by the players to return. Prior to gaining independence in 1960, the team was known as French Togoland.

=== 2006 World Cup ===
Togo lost their opening game of the World Cup, despite having taken the lead against South Korea through a goal by Mohamed Kader. In the second half, Jean-Paul Abalo was sent off after 55 minutes, and goals from Lee Chun-Soo and Ahn Jung-Hwan sealed a 2–1 defeat for Togo.

Togo's next opponents in Group G were Switzerland, with the match scheduled for the afternoon of 19 June. However, the Togo squad and manager Pfister threatened to refuse to fulfill the fixture and take strike action. The squad and manager had been quoted as requesting payments from the Togolese Football Federation for participating in the tournament of around €155,000 (US$192,000) with added bonuses for victories or draws. FIFA negotiated with the squad and manager on 17 June, persuading them to travel to Dortmund in time to fulfill the fixture; goals from Alexander Frei and Tranquillo Barnetta resulted in a 2–0 defeat. FIFA subsequently imposed a CHF100,000 fine on the Togolese federation for "behaviour unworthy of a participant in the World Cup."

Togo's final group game against France ended in a 2–0 defeat.

=== Sierra Leone air disaster ===
After a 2008 African Nations Cup qualifier away to Sierra Leone on 3 June 2007, 20 members of a delegation of sports officials from Togo, including Togolese Sports Minister Richard Attipoe, were killed when their helicopter exploded and crashed at Lungi International Airport. No players of the Togo national team were among the victims. The Togo players and officials of the team had been waiting to take the next helicopter flight to the island on which the airport is located.

=== 2010 bus ambush and ban ===
On 8 January 2010, the Togo team bus was attacked by gunmen as it travelled to the 2010 Africa Cup of Nations tournament, killing three and injuring several others. The separatist group Front for the Liberation of the Enclave of Cabinda (FLEC) claimed responsibility for the attack. Goalkeeper Kodjovi Obilalé was reported dead a day after the attack, though he actually survived. Such reports were later dismissed by his club GSI Pontivy in a press announcement, stating the player was actually undergoing surgery in South Africa.

Following the bus ambush attack, the Togolese Football Federation stated that they would withdraw from the 2010 Africa Cup of Nations; despite claims that the team had since reversed the decision and would compete "to show our national colours, our values and that we are men" (as announced by Thomas Dossevi), the government later ordered that the team return home.

Following the team's withdrawal, The Confederation of African Football (CAF) banned Togo from participating in the next two editions of the Cup of Nations and fined them US$50,000 because of the "decision taken by the political authorities". The CAF executive Committee considered that the Togolese team was in "forfeit notified less than twenty days before the start or during the final competition" (Art. 78 of the Regulations for the Africa Cup of Nations), rather than having withdrawn (Art. 80), and refused to consider the circumstances as force majeure (Art. 87). Togo's government immediately said they would sue as CAF "have no consideration for the lives of other human beings" and this is further "insulting to the family of those who lost their lives and those traumatized because of the attack". FIFA has yet to comment on the issue. Togo footballer Thomas Dossevi said, "We are a group of footballers who came under fire and now we can't play football anymore. They are crushing us". Togolese captain Emmanuel Adebayor described the decision as "outrageous" and said that CAF President Issa Hayatou had "completely betrayed" the Togo squad. FIFA subsequently helped lifted their ban entirely.

As a result of the events, Emmanuel Adebayor announced his retirement from international football on 12 April 2010. But on 22 March 2011, Adebayor announced that he was again available for the national team.

=== Fake Togo team ===
On 7 September 2010, Togo allegedly played Bahrain in a friendly losing the match 3–0. However, on 14 September, the Togo FA claimed that a fake team had played against Bahrain. Togo's Sports Minister Christophe Tchao said to the Jeune Afrique magazine that nobody in Togo had "ever been informed of such a game". On 20 September 2010, it was revealed that former Togo manager Bana Tchanilé was the culprit and the Togo FA have given him a three-year ban in addition to the two-year ban he got in July 2010 for taking Togo players to play a tournament in Egypt. The match fixing has been linked to Wilson Raj Perumal and the Singaporean match-fixing syndicate allegedly run by Tan Seet Eng. In January 2019, FIFA banned the match's referee, Ibrahim Chaibou of Niger, for his links to Perumal and being involved in corrupting other games, including two friendlies between South Africa and Guatemala and Nigeria v Argentina.

=== 2014 World Cup qualification ===
Togo began qualification for the 2014 World Cup on 11 November 2011, against Guinea-Bissau. They drew in the first leg 1–1. On 15 November 2011, they won the return leg 1–0. On 3 June 2012, they played Libya in Lome and drew 1–1. Shortly after on 10 June they played Congo DR at Kinshasa and lost 2–0. They resumed on 3 March 2013, and played Cameroon in Yaounde and lost 2–1. They met again on 9 June in Lome and Togo won 2–0. In the end, Togo failed to qualify for the 2014 World Cup in Brazil.

== Results and fixtures ==
The following is a list of match results in the last 12 months, as well as any future matches that have been scheduled.

Win Draw Loss Fixture

=== 2026 ===
27 March Friendly	Togo	2–2	Guinea	Rabat, Morocco
16:00 UTC+1	Denkey 26' (pen.); Metsoko 78' (pen.)	Report	M. Cissé 85'; Guirassy 89'	Stadium: Moulay El Hassan Stadium; Referee: Amir Loussif (Tunisia)

31 March Friendly	Niger	0–1	Togo	Casablanca, Morocco
17:00 UTC+1		Report	Denkey 5'	Stadium: Père Jégo Stadium; Referee: Mohamed El Baroudi (Morocco)

5 June Friendly	Central African Republic	1–1	Togo	Rabat, Morocco
12:00 UTC+1	Koyalipou 26'	Report	Denkey 60'	Stadium: Moulay El Hassan Stadium; Referee: Mohamed El Baroudi (Morocco)

9 June Friendly	Togo	5–1	Benin	Mohammedia, Morocco
19:00 UTC+1	Tijani 39' (o.g.); Komlavi 58'; Djené 68'; Denkey 74'; Laba 88'	Report	F.Santos 6'	Stadium: El Bachir Stadium; Referee: Mohamed El Baroudi (Morocco)

25 September 2027 AFCON qualification	Togo	v	Burundi	Lomé, Togo
18:00 UTC+0	1		0	Stadium: Kégué Stadium

29 September 2027 AFCON qualification	Zambia	v	Togo	TBD, Zambia
18:00 UTC+0				Stadium: TBD

11 November 2027 AFCON qualification	Algeria	v	Togo	TBD, Algeria
TBD				Stadium: TBD

15 November 2027 AFCON qualification	Togo	v	Algeria	TBD, Togo
TBD				Stadium: TBD

=== 2027 ===
24 March 2027 AFCON qualification	Burundi	v	Togo	TBD, Burundi
TBD				Stadium: TBD

28 March 2027 AFCON qualification	Togo	v	Zambia	TBD, Togo
TBD				Stadium: TBD

== Coaches ==
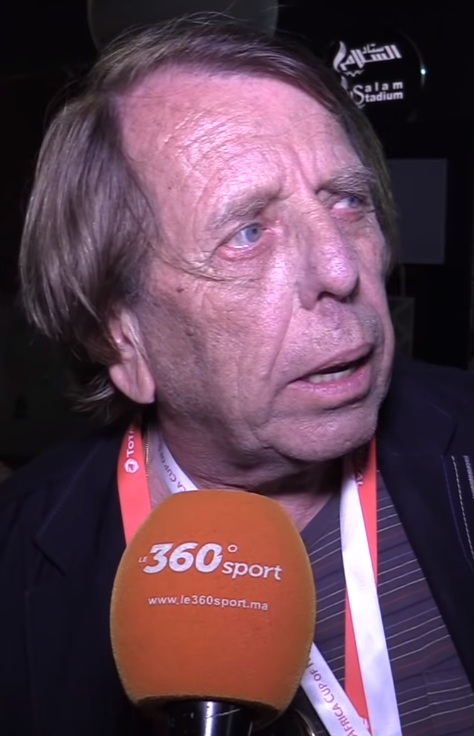
Claude Le Roy became the manager of Togo in 2016

Caretaker managers are listed in italics.

- (France) Jean Robin (1965)
- (Germany) Gottlieb Göller (1970–1974, 1984, 1996–1997, 1998–2000)
- (Socialist Federal Republic of Yugoslavia) Boško Antić (1987–1989)
- (Togo) Julien Dovi Aguiar (1992)
- (Togo) Baboima Ergot (1993)
- (Togo) Paul Messan Zougbédé (1997)
- (Germany) Eberhard Vogel (1997–1998)
- (Togo) Kodjovi Mawuéna (2000)
- (Togo) Bana Tchanile (2000–2002)
- (France) (Italy) Diego Garzitto (2002)
- (Brazil) Antônio Dumas (2002–2004)
- (Nigeria) Stephen Keshi (2004–2006, 2007–2008, 2011)
- (Germany) Otto Pfister (2006)
- (France) Henri Stambouli (2008)
- (Togo) Kodjovi Mawuéna (2008–2009)
- (Belgium) Jean Thissen (2009)
- (France) Hubert Velud (2009–2010)
- (France) Thierry Froger (2010–2011)
- (France) Didier Six (2011–2014)
- (Togo) Tchakala Tchanilé (2014)
- (Belgium) Tom Saintfiet (2015–2016)
- (France) Claude Le Roy (2016–2021)
- (Togo) Jonas Komla (2021)
- (Portugal) Paulo Duarte (2021–2024)
- (Togo) Daré Nibombé (2024–2025)
- (France) Patrice Neveu (2026–present)

== Players ==
=== Current squad ===
The following players were called up for the 2027 Africa Cup of Nations qualification matches against Burundi and Zambia on 25 and 29 September 2026, respectively.

Caps and goals correct as of 29 September 2026, after the match against Zambia.

No.	Pos.	Player	Date of birth (age)	Caps	Goals	Club
	GK	Malcolm Barcola	14 May 1999 (age 27)	29	0	(Royal Moroccan Football Federation) IR Tanger
	GK	Steven Mensah	22 May 2003 (age 23)	12	0	(Luxembourg Football Federation) Etzella Ettelbruck
	GK	Achirafou Yaya	26 July 2004 (age 22)	0	0	(Ivorian Football Federation) ISCA
	DF	Djené	31 December 1991 (age 34)	91	1	(Royal Spanish Football Federation) Getafe
	DF	Youssifou Atté	16 May 1996 (age 30)	20	0	(Ivorian Football Federation) ASEC Mimosas
	DF	Abdoul-Sabourh Bode	22 January 1995 (age 31)	20	0	(Congolese Association Football Federation) TP Mazembe
	DF	Kévin Boma	20 November 2002 (age 23)	12	0	(Austrian Football Association) Red Bull Salzburg
	DF	Steven Nador	23 June 2002 (age 24)	10	0	(Italian Football Federation) Modena
	DF	Gustave Akueson	20 December 1995 (age 30)	6	0	(French Football Federation) Bastia
	DF	Pierre Nadjombe	10 May 2003 (age 23)	4	0	(German Football Association) 1. FC Magdeburg
	DF	Izak Akakpo	28 February 2004 (age 22)	3	0	(French Football Federation) Lorient
	DF	Henri Koudossou	3 September 1999 (age 27)	2	0	(German Football Association) Arminia Bielefeld
	DF	Augustin Drakpe	8 December 2001 (age 24)	1	0	(Football Association of the Czech Republic) Slovan Liberec
	MF	Dermane Karim	26 December 2003 (age 22)	30	4	(French Football Federation) Troyes
	MF	Kodjo Aziangbe	14 December 2003 (age 22)	17	0	(Chinese Football Association) Shanghai Port
	MF	Sadik Fofana	16 May 2003 (age 23)	11	1	(Italian Football Federation) Lecce
	MF	Samsondin Ouro	2 March 2000 (age 26)	10	0	(Slovak Football Association) Dunajska Streda
	MF	Faad Sana	15 April 2003 (age 23)	4	0	(Football Association of Slovenia) Mura
	MF	Zuberu Sharani	7 January 2000 (age 26)	2	0	(Israel Football Association) Hapoel Jerusalem
	FW	Kodjo Fo-Doh Laba	27 January 1992 (age 34)	58	20	(United Arab Emirates Football Association) Sharjah
	FW	Kévin Denkey	30 November 2000 (age 25)	49	13	(United States Soccer Federation) FC Cincinnati
	FW	Yaw Annor	3 December 1997 (age 28)	14	2	(Egyptian Football Association) National Bank of Egypt
	FW	Arnaud Komlavi	10 February 2001 (age 25)	5	1	(Egyptian Football Association) Tala'ea El Gaish
	FW	Charles Abi	12 April 2000 (age 26)	5	0	(French Football Federation) Valenciennes
	FW	Mansour Ouro-Tagba	17 December 2004 (age 21)	4	0	(German Football Association) VfL Bochum

=== Recent call-ups ===
The following players have been called up for Togo in the last twelve months.

Pos.	Player	Date of birth (age)	Caps	Goals	Club	Latest call-up
GK	Mensah Ekoue	11 December 2004 (age 21)	0	0	(Togo) ASC Kara	v. Benin, 9 June 2026
GK	Fabrice Kagbatawouli	28 December 2002 (age 23)	0	0	(Togo) Barracuda	v. Niger, 31 March 2026
DF	Kennedy Boateng	29 November 1996 (age 29)	14	0	(Romania) Dinamo București	v. Benin, 9 June 2026
DF	Loïc Bessilé	19 February 1999 (age 27)	17	0	(Slovakia) Trenčín	v. Niger, 31 March 2026
DF	Josué Homawoo	12 November 1997 (age 29)	5	0	(Belgium) Standard Liège	v. Niger, 31 March 2026
DF	Yannis Lawson	24 November 2004 (age 21)	0	0	(France) Metz	v. Niger, 31 March 2026
MF	Roger Aholou	30 December 1993 (age 32)	24	1	(Libya) Al-Ittihad	v. Benin, 9 June 2026
MF	Bastou Djibril	23 March 2007 (age 19)	2	0	(Ivory Coast) Yamoussoukro	v. Benin, 9 June 2026
MF	Agno Aimé Koffi	14 September 2001 (age 25)	1	0	(Togo) ASKO Kara	v. Benin, 9 June 2026
MF	Mouhamed Kpelafia	30 November 2006 (age 19)	1	0	(Togo) ASC Kara	v. Benin, 9 June 2026
FW	Yannis Sankoutcha	17 May 2004 (age 22)	2	0	(France) Tarbes Pyrénées	v. Benin, 9 June 2026
FW	Idjessi Metsoko	14 March 2002 (age 24)	1	1	(Slovakia) Spartak Trnava	v. Benin, 9 June 2026
^{DEC} Player refused to join the team after the call-up.^{INJ} Player withdrew from the squad due to an injury.^{PRE} Preliminary squad.^{RET} Player has retired from international football.^{SUS} Suspended from the national team.

== Records ==
As of 13 October 2025
Players in bold are still active with Togo.

=== Most appearances ===
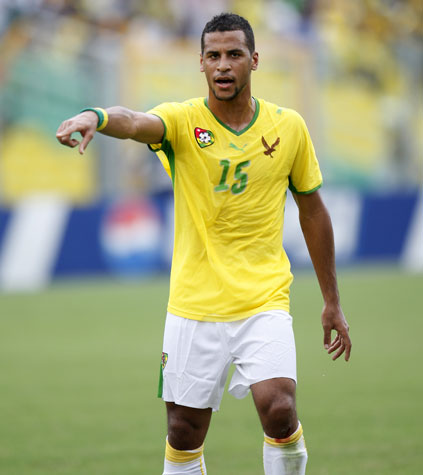
Alaixys Romao is Togo's most capped player with 97 appearances.

Rank	Player	Caps	Goals	Career
1	**Alaixys Romao**	97	0	2005–present
2	Abdoul-Gafar Mamah	93	0	2000–2016
3	**Djené Dakonam**	92	1	2012–present
4	Emmanuel Adebayor	88	32	2000–2019
5	Kossi Agassa	84	0	1998–2017
6	Moustapha Salifou	77	8	2000–2013
7	Jean-Paul Abalo	74	1	1992–2008
8	Komlan Améwou	69	5	2000–2015
9	Tadjou Salou	62	12	1992–2004
10	Serge Akakpo	61	2	2008–2017
10	Mohamed Kader	61	13	1995–2009

=== Top goalscorers ===
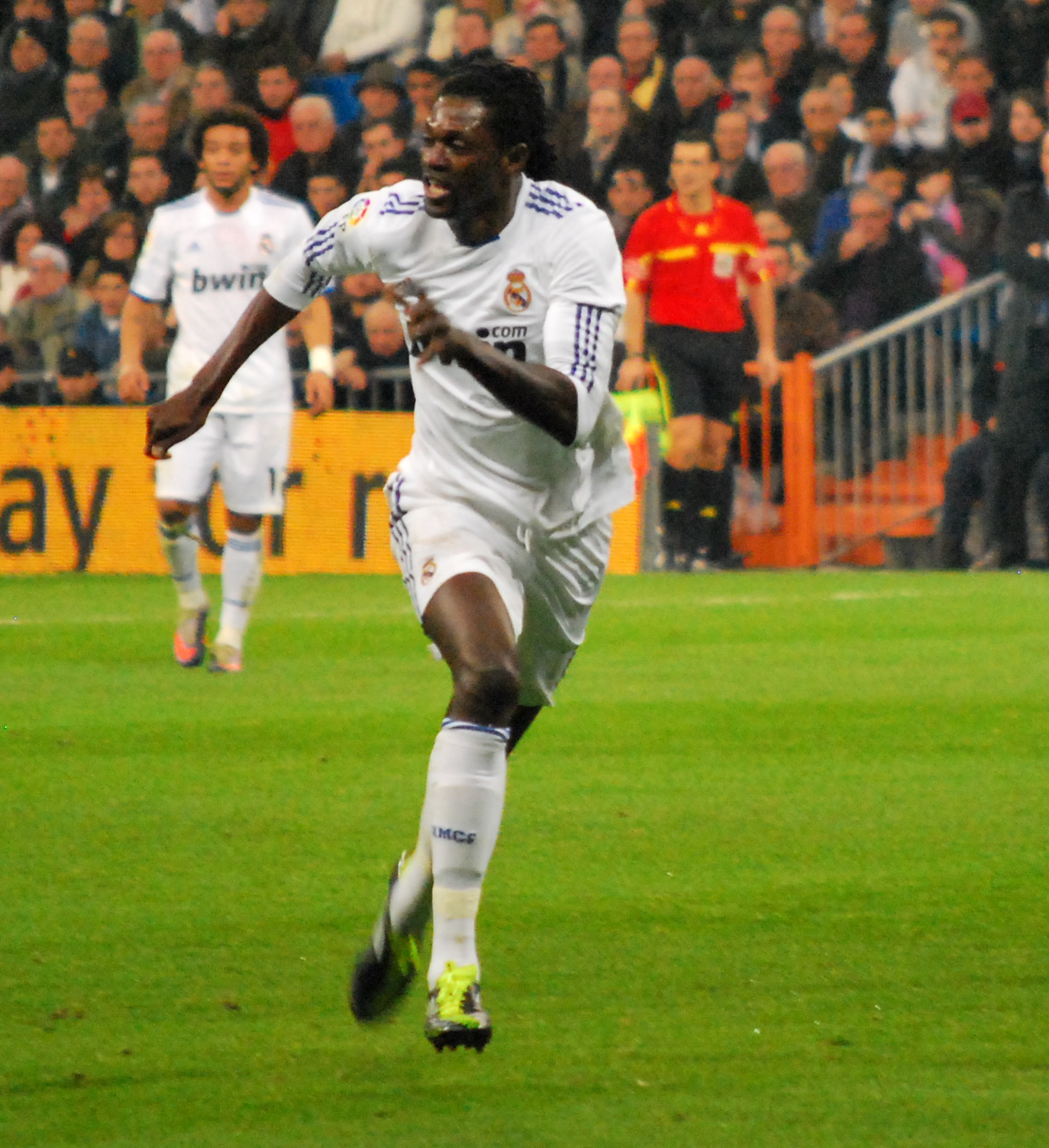
Emmanuel Adebayor is Togo's top scorer with 32 goals.

Rank	Player	Goals	Caps	Ratio	Career
1	Emmanuel Adebayor (list)	32	88	0.36	2000–2019
2	**Kodjo Fo-Doh Laba**	20	55	0.36	2016–present
3	Kossi Noutsoudje	13	40	0.33	1994–2002
3	Mohamed Kader	13	61	0.21	1995–2009
5	Tadjou Salou	12	62	0.19	1992–2004
6	Floyd Ayité	11	48	0.23	2007–2022
7	**Kévin Denkey**	10	42	0.24	2018–present
8	**Euloge Placca Fessou**	9	36	0.25	2012–present
8	Adékambi Olufadé	9	41	0.22	1998–2010
10	Moustapha Salifou	8	77	0.1	2000–2013

== Competition records ==
=== FIFA World Cup ===
FIFA World Cup record										Qualification record					
Year	Round	Position	Pld	W	D*	L	GF	GA	Squad	Pld	W	D	L	GF	GA
1930 to 1958	Part of France									Part of France					
(Chile) 1962	Not a FIFA member									Not a FIFA member					
(England) 1966	Did not enter									Did not enter					
(Mexico) 1970	Did not enter									Did not enter					
(West Germany) 1974	Did not qualify									2	0	1	1	0	4
(Argentina) 1978	Did not qualify									4	1	1	2	3	5
(Spain) 1982	Did not qualify									2	1	0	1	2	2
(Mexico) 1986	Withdrew									Withdrew					
(Italy) 1990	Withdrew									Withdrew					
(United States) 1994	Did not qualify									5	0	0	5	2	11
(France) 1998	Did not qualify									8	2	2	4	9	16
(South Korea) (Japan) 2002	Did not qualify									10	3	4	3	13	13
(Germany) 2006	Group stage	30th	3	0	0	3	1	6	Squad	12	8	2	2	22	9
(South Africa) 2010	Did not qualify									10	4	2	4	11	10
(Brazil) 2014	Did not qualify									8	2	2	4	6	12
(Russia) 2018	Did not qualify									2	0	0	2	0	4
(Qatar) 2022	Did not qualify									8	3	3	2	8	7
(Canada) (Mexico) (United States) 2026	Did not qualify									10	1	5	4	5	10
(Morocco) (Portugal) (Spain) 2030	To be determined									To be determined					
(Saudi Arabia) 2034	To be determined									To be determined					
Total	Group stage	1/16	3	0	0	3	1	6	—	81	25	22	34	81	103

2006 FIFA World Cup starting lineup

=== Africa Cup of Nations ===
Africa Cup of Nations record										Qualification record					
Year	Round	Position	Pld	W	D*	L	GF	GA	Squad	Pld	W	D*	L	GF	GA
(Sudan) 1957	Part of France									Part of France					
(United Arab Republic) 1959	Part of France									Part of France					
(Ethiopia) 1962	Not affiliated to CAF									Not affiliated to CAF					
(Ghana) 1963	Not affiliated to CAF									Not affiliated to CAF					
(Tunisia) 1965	Did not enter									Did not enter					
(Ethiopia) 1968	Did not qualify									4	1	0	3	3	9
(Sudan) 1970	Did not qualify									2	0	1	1	1	5
(Cameroon) 1972	Group stage	7th	3	0	2	1	4	6	Squad	4	2	2	0	3	1
(Egypt) 1974	Withdrew									Withdrew					
(Ethiopia) 1976	Did not qualify									6	3	0	3	9	7
(Ghana) 1978	Did not qualify									2	1	0	1	1	2
(Nigeria) 1980	Did not qualify									4	3	0	1	3	9
(Libya) 1982	Did not qualify									2	0	1	1	2	6
(Ivory Coast) 1984	Group stage	8th	3	0	1	2	1	7	Squad	8	8	0	0	11	2
(Egypt) 1986	Did not qualify									2	0	1	1	1	2
(Morocco) 1988	Did not qualify									2	0	1	1	1	3
(Algeria) 1990	Withdrew									Withdrew					
(Senegal) 1992	Did not qualify									8	2	2	4	4	9
(Tunisia) 1994	Withdrew during qualifying									Withdrew					
(South Africa) 1996	Did not qualify									8	1	3	4	5	10
(Burkina Faso) 1998	Group stage	12th	3	1	0	2	4	6	Squad	8	4	2	2	10	5
(Ghana) (Nigeria) 2000	Group stage	10th	3	1	1	1	2	3	Squad	6	3	1	2	12	6
(Mali) 2002	Group stage	12th	3	0	2	1	0	3	Squad	6	3	2	1	8	6
(Tunisia) 2004	Did not qualify									6	3	1	2	9	7
(Egypt) 2006	Group stage	16th	3	0	0	3	2	7	Squad	12	9	1	2	22	4
(Ghana) 2008	Did not qualify									6	3	0	3	9	7
(Angola) 2010	Withdrew due to rebel attack									Withdrew					
(Equatorial Guinea) (Gabon) 2012	Did not qualify									8	1	3	4	6	10
(South Africa) 2013	Quarter-finals	8th	4	1	1	2	4	4	Squad	4	1	1	2	5	3
(Equatorial Guinea) 2015	Did not qualify									6	2	0	4	7	12
(Gabon) 2017	Group stage	16th	3	0	1	2	2	6	Squad	6	3	2	1	11	4
(Egypt) 2019	Did not qualify									6	1	2	3	4	8
(Cameroon) 2021	Did not qualify									6	0	2	4	3	8
(Ivory Coast) 2023	Did not qualify									6	2	2	2	8	8
(Morocco) 2025	Did not qualify									6	1	2	3	7	10
(Kenya) (Tanzania) (Uganda) 2027	To be determined									To be determined					
2029	To be determined									To be determined					
Total	Quarter-finals	8/35	25	3	8	14	19	42	—	144	57	32	55	165	163

=== African Nations Championship ===
African Nations Championship record
Appearances: 1
Year	Round	Position	Pld	W	D	L	GF	GA
(Ivory Coast) 2009	Did not qualify							
(Sudan) 2011	Did not qualify							
(South Africa) 2014	Did not qualify							
(Rwanda) 2016	Did not qualify							
(Morocco) 2018	Did not qualify							
(Cameroon) 2020	Group stage	11th	3	1	0	2	4	5
(Algeria) 2022	Did not qualify							
(Kenya) (Tanzania) (Uganda) 2024	Did not qualify							
Total	Group stage	1/8	3	1	0	2	4	5

=== African Games ===
African Games record
Year	Round	Pld	W	D	L	GF	GA
(Republic of the Congo) 1965	Group stage	3	1	1	1	5	9
(Kenya) 1987	Did not qualify						
Total	1/4	3	1	1	1	5	9

== Honours ==
=== Regional ===
- West African Nations Cup
  - (silver) Runners-up (4): 1982, 1983, 1984, 1986
- WAFU Nations Cup
  - (gold) Champions (1): 2011
  - (bronze) Third place (1): 2013
