= Mawade Wade =

Senegalese football manager (1928–2004)

Personal information
- Date of birth: 28 March 1928
- Place of birth: Saint-Louis, Senegal
- Date of death: 14 September 2004 (aged 76)
- Place of death: Saint-Louis, Senegal

Managerial career
- Years: Team
- 1950–1965: Réveil de Saint-Louis
- 1986–1989: Senegal

Mawade Wade (28 March 1928 – 14 September 2004) was a Senegalese football manager.

== Career ==
Following a career as a teacher, Wade moved into football, founding Réveil de Saint-Louis in 1950. Wade managed the club until 1965, becoming technical director of the Senegal national team the following year. In 1970, Wade joined the Confederation of African Football committee.

During the late 1980s, Wade managed Senegal, taking charge of the team at the 1987 All-Africa Games and the 1988 Amílcar Cabral Cup. In March 1990, Wade took up a seat at the Confederation of African Football's executive committee. Wade lost his position on the executive committee in March 1994, however was re-elected in 1998 and 2002.

== Personal life and death ==
Politically, Wade identified himself as a leftist, an anti-imperialist and a pan-Africanist.

On 11 August 2002, Wade suffered a stroke. On 14 September 2004, Wade died in his hometown of Saint-Louis. Following his death, the Stade de Linguère was renamed to the Stade Mawade Wade.
