= Foundation of the Premier League =

Foundation of the English Football Premier League

The foundation of the Premier League in English football occurred in the early 1990s. A proposal for the establishment of a new league was tabled at the end of the 1990–91 season. It received the support of representatives of all eighteen First Division clubs, as well as The Football Association (FA) through its "Blueprint for the Future of Football" publication. The Premier League was actualised in stages: the signing of the Founder Members Agreement on 17 July 1991, clubs handing a joint notice of resignation from the Football League, and the final go-ahead from the FA who administered affairs.

The Premier League was created "to prevent the top clubs from losing income to the lower leagues", but also served the purpose of maximising the clubs' bargaining position for when the next television contract was up for renewal. ITV held exclusive rights to live Football League matches, having paid £44 million over a four-year period (1988–1992). The arrangement came after the withdrawal of a joint bid made by the BBC and British Satellite Broadcasting (BSB). Both broadcasters later obtained rights to FA Cup football.

Unlike the Football League, the Premier League was set up with a two-man board: Rick Parry, the chief executive, and Sir John Quinton who was appointed as the league's chairman in December 1991. Decisions would be taken on by all members, through a one club-one vote motion. A clear majority needed two-thirds.

== The big five ==
The first major step to its formation occurred in October 1990, when the managing director of London Weekend Television (LWT), Greg Dyke, met with the representatives of the "big five" clubs – David Dein of Arsenal, Philip Carter of Everton, Noel White of Liverpool, Martin Edwards of Manchester United and Irving Scholar of Tottenham Hotspur. The meeting was to pave the way for a breakaway from the Football League. Dyke believed that it would be more lucrative for ITV if only the larger clubs in the country were featured on national television and wanted to establish whether the clubs would be interested in a larger share of television rights money.

Talk of a super league of elite English clubs had been frequently mentioned by various footballing bodies, and by the media, since the mid-1980s.

The fundamental difference between the old Football League and the breakaway league (what became the Premier League) is that the money in the breakaway league would only be divided between the clubs active in that division whilst in the previous arrangement it was shared between all Football League clubs across all divisions. The plan was drawn up for a Premier League of 18 clubs to be created in time for the 1992–93 season, although the recently announced plan to increase the First Division from 20 to 22 clubs for the 1991–92 season still went ahead, as the creation of the Premier League had still not been confirmed by this stage. However, 14 of the 22 clubs who would be competing in that season's First Division had agreed to form a breakaway league of their own if the Football Association's bid to create a breakaway league failed.

The five clubs decided it was a good idea and decided to press ahead with it, however the league would have no credibility without the backing of The Football Association and so David Dein of Arsenal held talks to see whether the FA were receptive to the idea. The FA did not enjoy an amicable relationship with the Football League at the time and considered it as a way to weaken the Football League's position. Football League president Bill Fox even described the FA's plans to form a breakaway league as an attempt to "hijack" the First Division.

== Broadcasting rights ==
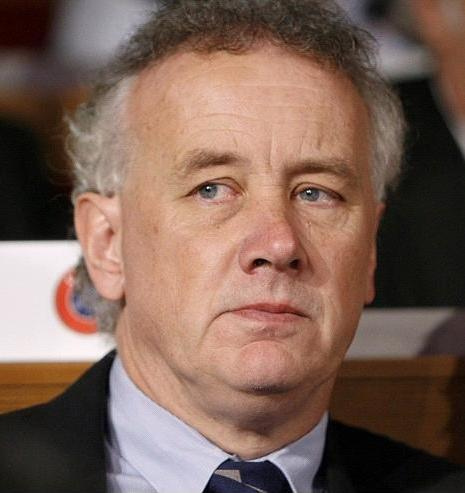
Rick Parry was heavily involved in negotiations with the broadcasters.

The Premier League was formed with the intention of English football's top clubs capitalising on television rights. Whereas in the Football League money is distributed to the lower leagues, the Premier League intended to sell its own rights, with earnings from broadcasts divided equally between the member clubs only. The decision to break away and start a new league also gave clubs the chance to vote on decisions through a one club-one vote motion.

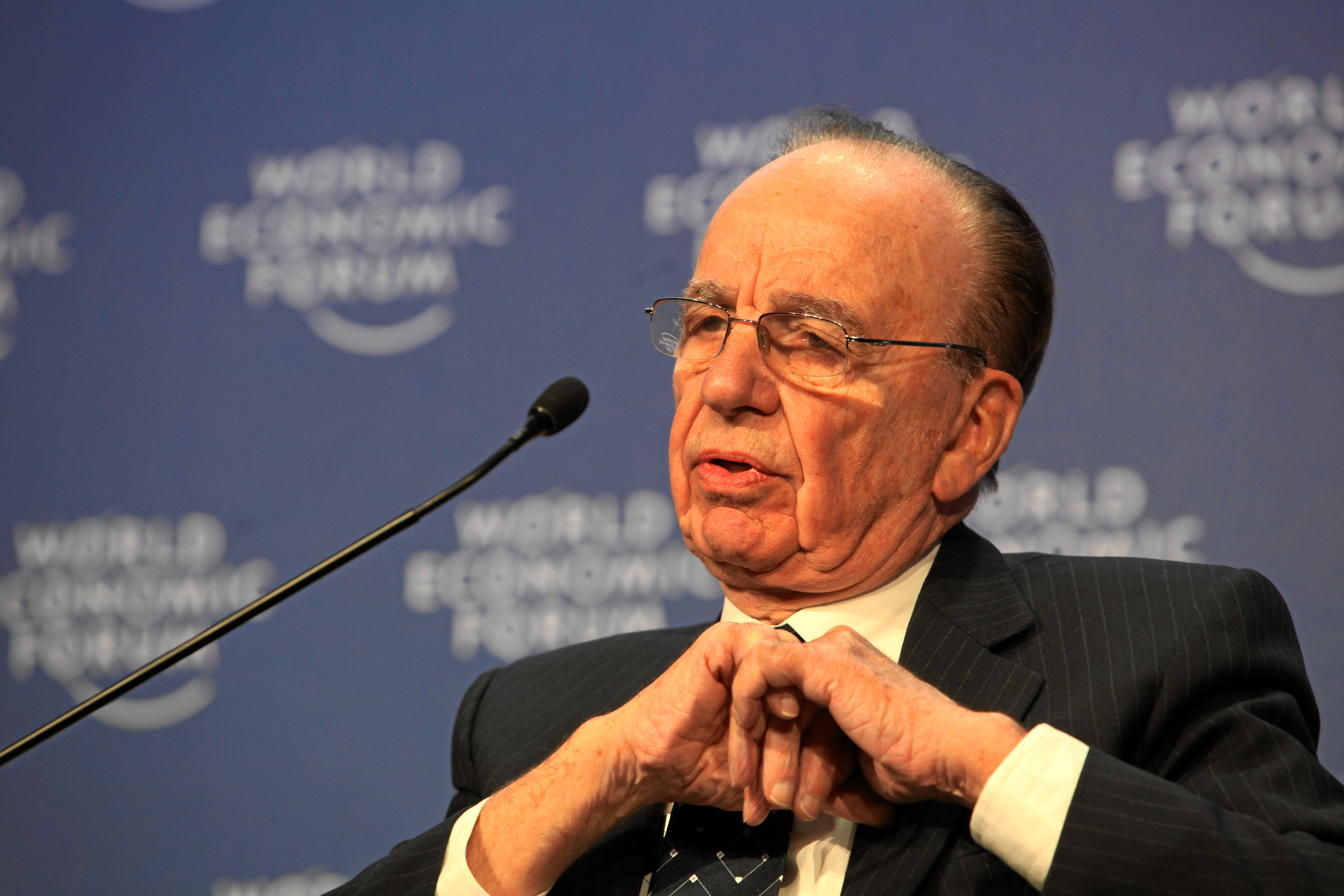
Rupert Murdoch wanted Premier League football to improve BSkyB's profitability.

In November 1990, Rupert Murdoch's Sky Television merged with satellite competitor BSB to form a new company – BSkyB. The takeover created problems for Murdoch as the company was losing £14 million per week. Cost-cutting measures were imposed by BSkyB's new chief executive Sam Chisholm, one being the successful negotiation of cheaper contracts to screen films from Hollywood studios.

Although their financial position was far more stable by the end of 1991, BSkyB accumulated £2 billion in debt and stood to lose £1.5 million per week. To counteract this, the company considered purchasing Thames Television, but Murdoch decided against it because the price was too high. BSkyB therefore was left with three options: offer its subscribers pornography, major films or exclusive sporting events. The first presented itself with "too many problems" and BSkyB for the second were not prepared to renegotiate with the film industry so sport was seen as the best choice. BSkyB already held rights to cricket and rugby league and assembled talent to present its growing football coverage. Chisholm identified the Premier League as a target, aware that smaller clubs did not favour ITV's coverage. Live rights to top-flight football was moreover unaffordable for the BBC, whose priority was restoring Match of the Day to its traditional spot on Saturday evenings.

Premier League chief executive Rick Parry and chairman Sir John Quinton were assigned the task of finding suitors. Parry initially favoured working with ITV, led by Greg Dyke, but wanted the network to pay in excess of £30 million for live football. In the meantime BSkyB – a company formed by the merger of Rupert Murdoch's Sky Television, and British Satellite Broadcasting – looked into the possibility of obtaining live rights to the Premier League. BSkyB chief executive Sam Chisholm attempted to make a joint offer with ITV which did not come into fruition, so he formed an alliance with the BBC, as he was aware the corporation wanted a highlights package. Although Chisholm was against Parry's idea of a football-only channel, he built a rapport with the Premier League and his company invited Parry to its facilities in Livingston, where he spoke to Murdoch in person.

=== Bidding process ===
The Premier League intended to sell its own television rights, with the proceeds going directly to the 22 member clubs. Parry and Quinton were assigned the task of finding suitors, but the former's negotiation skills worried Arsenal chairman David Dein. He persuaded the clubs to set up a separate working party, which led by himself, Ron Noades and Bill Fotherby in October 1991 came to an agreement of the sale of a shared package. The party was short-lived however; hostility towards Dein meant the other clubs settled with Parry and Quinton in charge of matters. As Mihir Bose, author of Game Changer: How the English Premier League Came to Dominate the World notes, "That did not prevent rival club chairman from meeting competing broadcasters on their own." Dein for instance visited Greg Dyke, chairman of London Weekend Television (LWT), and was offered £4 million per year, over four seasons in pursuance of live Arsenal, Tottenham Hotspur, Manchester United, Liverpool and Everton home games on ITV. Dyke intended to make the same offer to the fifteen other Premier League clubs.

By November 1991, BSkyB's interest in Premier League rights had become publicised. The company met with Noades and Chelsea chairman Ken Bates, though nothing came to fruition. Bates wanted an end to ITV's monopoly, whereas Noades felt pay-per-view (PPV) was the way forward. BSkyB's head of sport David Hill believed there was too much football and he wanted the season to be shortened much like the National Football League. Parry, present at the talks was unimpressed and recorded in his diary for 21 November 1991: "Shambles. Noades/Bates at cross purposes – ludicrous ideas from Hill!"

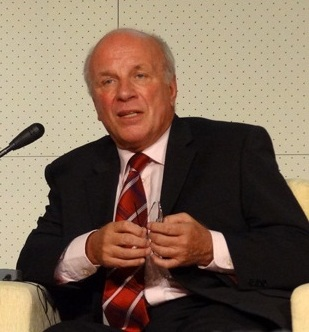
Greg Dyke refused to partner Sky

Dein in the meantime pursued an offer from a television consortium, funded by the Swiss Bank Corporation (SBC). They intended to create a football-only channel, available on the Astra satellite transponder. The Observer believed that in addition to broadcasting league matches, SBC would offer a selection of top clubs fees for airing matches against their European counterparts. Dein was impressed by the proposal – financier Chris Akers forecasted profits of up to £50 million – so he forwarded it to Parry. Although he too was impressed, SBC's offer eventually failed because of sponsorship doubts.

At the beginning of 1992 Parry favoured a deal with ITV, but thought the network should be prepared to pay up towards £30 million for live football. At a meeting in January 1992, Dyke made it clear ITV would not be positioned as they were already paying too much for football. He and executive director Trevor East commented on BSkyB's debt and felt the company would be forced to increase their borrowing if they were awarded a contract. This did not dissuade Quinton, who urged Murdoch to bid. Quinton even informed Chisholm that there were no bidding rules.

Before Sky made a formalised bid, Murdoch asked Chisholm to speak to Dyke about making a joint offer. The events of that meeting are vague, but what is clear was that Chisholm came to the decision of not working with ITV. He instead chose to pursue an alliance with the BBC, aware of the cultural importance of Match of the Day. In February 1992, Quinton met Murdoch over lunch to go over his expectations, with the idea of a Premier League dedicated channel high on his priority. ITV had in the same month revealed plans to offer the league £80m over four years in exchange for exclusive rights. Dyke believed their deal would fend off BSkyB, but the BBC's quiet stance weakened ITV's position.

When the first bids had been tabled by March 1992, Parry and Quinton enlisted the help of Academy, a market research company to look at sponsorship potential, and David Plowright for advice on broadcasting issues. SBC around this time submitted plans for a dedicated football channel and wrote to Parry about the long-term issues the league would face if they sold out to Sky. Chisholm was against a football-only channel; Parry recorded a meeting between the two in his diary for 12 March 1992:

"Sees football on sub channel with other sports. On Swiss Bank proposals, 'people will not [pay] £10 per month for wall-to-wall football' Will match ITV + pay-per-view possibilities. Wants RP to go to LA to meet Rupert! Formal bid within 14 days."

Chisholm submitted his offer with the BBC, which promoted the return of Match of the Day. He told Parry that BSkyB would move its sports coverage on a subscription basis if they obtained rights – the network's revenues up until then "had derived entirely from conventional sales of advertising." To build up support, Sky aired the Footballers' Football Show – a highbrow programme that invited Premier League chairmen to offer insight about the sport. This tactic concerned ITV, who in the meantime prepared a bid for Football League rights as a fall back. Nearer the time of the vote, Sky invited Parry to their facilities in Livingston. He was given time to speak to Murdoch, who promised him his newspapers would back the Premier League if BSkyB won rights.

In April 1992, ITV offered Parry an improved bid of £34 million per year, which bettered the BBC's joint-bid with BSkyB. East was confident of closing the deal – he was supported by 11 club chairmen and was informed that ITV's rivals would have to come up with £100 million a year to better their offer. Parry was undecided as to which bid he preferred; though he favoured a non-exclusive deal with ITV, he wanted the reconsider its decision to work with subscription companies. He harboured the idea of a football channel and noted SBC's approval amongst other clubs. Parry also hoped BSkyB would increase their bid, which they later did.

==== "Blow them out of the water" ====
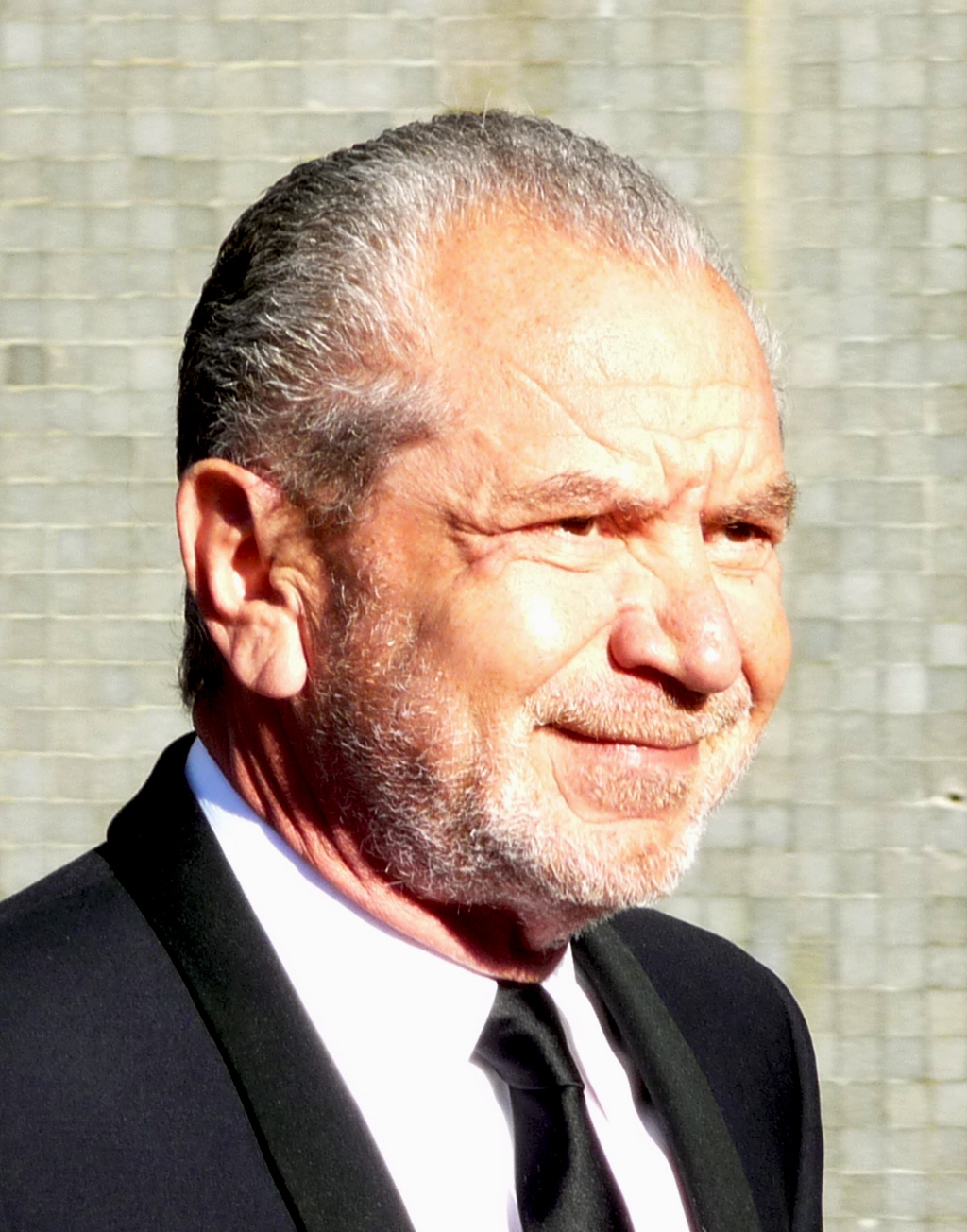
Alan Sugar informed the BSkyB camp about ITV's improved offer.

Parry arranged for the league chairmen to vote on 18 May 1992. Four days earlier BSkyB and ITV made their formal presentations to the chairmen; Chisholm hinted to his audience that BSkyB would increase their offer. This concerned Dyke, who on the weekend before the vote arranged an urgent meeting with East. They both telephoned the ITV companies to convince them to raise their collective bid. It came to a total of £262 million – £155 million of which spread out over five years, for 30 live games per season. East presented their new offer to the chairmen and Parry.

Having received ITV's improved bid, Parry on the day of the vote phoned an anxious Chisholm. He urged him to bid higher and agreed to delay the voting procedure. Chisholm called an emergency meeting, where he was told by one company advisor not to match ITV's offer. Chisholm decided against and phoned Murdoch in New York in the early hours to seek permission to raise BSkyB's bid. Their new offer totalled £304 million; £35 million for 60 live games which rose to £40 million in the fifth year. Chisholm telephoned Parry and faxed him the details of BSkyB's bid. It was claimed that East saw Sugar on the morning of the vote talking to someone about ITV's bid and telling them to "blow them out of the water." Sugar originally denied this, but in later years confessed it was in fact Chisholm.

Parry resumed the clubs' meeting and recommended BSkyB's offer to the chairmen. He believed the company was a frontrunner in encryption services and was pleased they offered a 50–50 partnership with the Premier League to exploit PPV. BSkyB's alliance with the BBC also convinced Parry; when he informed Dyke of this, the ITV chairman threatened to do a deal directly with the clubs which angered him.

During the meeting Dein attempted to get Sugar disqualified from casting his vote on grounds the Tottenham Hotspur chairman had vested interest, but was overruled. Dein also questioned BSkyB's debt, to which Quinton retorted "Are there any guarantees that we will get our money? Every company goes into debt." BSkyB eventually won the vote by 14 to 6, with two abstentions. Arsenal, Aston Villa, Everton, Leeds United, Liverpool and Manchester United voted in favour of ITV. Had Tottenham Hotspur also sided with ITV, the two-thirds majority would not have applied.

=== Reaction ===
Parry was delighted with the outcome: "After many days of being behind the closed doors we are confident BSkyB and the BBC will be committed to taking us into the next century." Chisholm felt the deal would mark a new era in football, adding: "We promised Sky subscribers the widest possible choice in sports and entertainment when we launched and that is a promise we intend to keep."

The return of Match of the Day pleased Martin, as was securing the rights to Liverpool's European matches the following season: "Alongside the FA Cup, England's home internationals and the return of Match of the Day with Premier League games, the BBC's pattern of football coverage is shaping up nicely." Channel 4 chairman Michael Grade was inquisitive about the telephone calls made by Marmaduke Hussey and Michael Checkland which signalled the corporation's u-turn, and said BSkyB was "a monster that could devour it in due course."

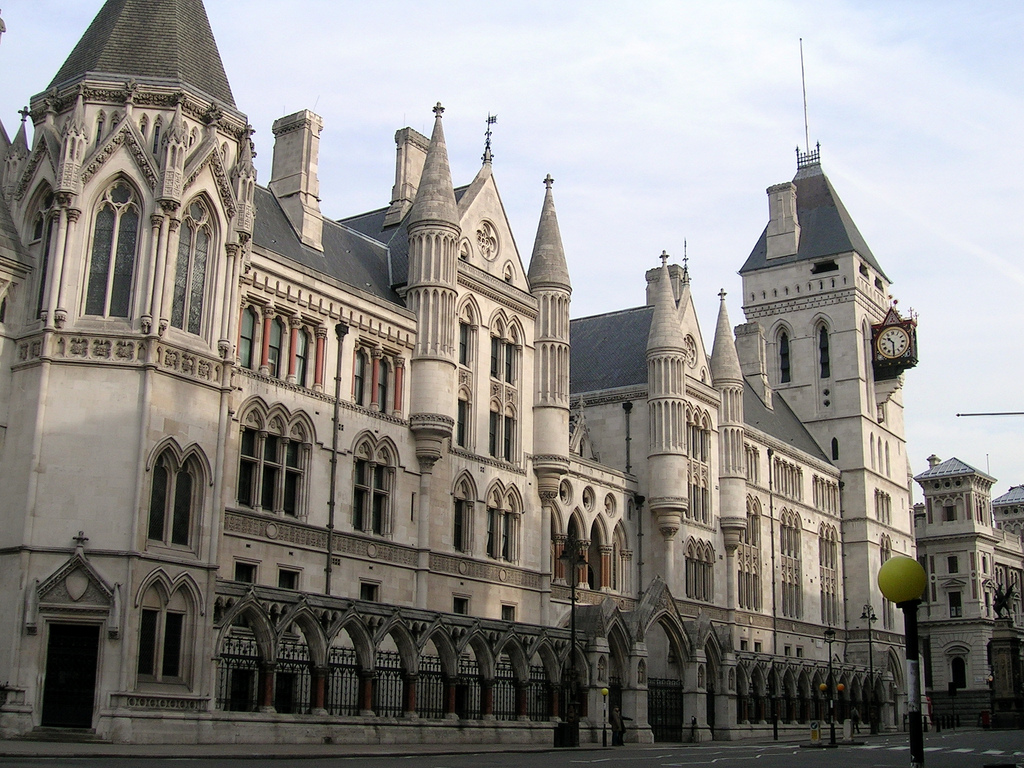
The High Court rejected ITV's appeal to have the arrangement put on hold.

Dyke believed it was significant that "six of the largest clubs" voted against BSkyB. He wrote a formal letter to Quinton which asked for the bidding process to be reopened as the network was barred from bettering BSkyB's bid. Quinton however rejected the plea and clarified the league's stance: BSkyB's bid was better "... not only in money terms but as far as the potential for future income is concerned." The ITV companies sought legal action, claiming a breach of obligation on behalf of Quinton and Parry. East revealed that it was only after BSkyB had won did they discover the company had submitted an improved bid: "At no stage were we informed that Sky had put in another bid and nor were we given any opportunity to increase our bid in response." Parry said ITV would have won broadcasting rights had they "allowed us to have a pay channel in the long term and it had terrestrial coverage in the short-term." The High Court refused to grant an injunction; the judge concluded the matter was "a great deal more difficult than it seems at first sight" and it would be wrong to force the league to consider new offers. The court however found an arguable case for a breach of confidence. Soon afterwards, ITV issued a writ seeking damages against the FA and Premier League. They also submitted a separate complaint to the Office of Fair Trading to look into Murdoch's newspapers.

The deal attracted mass attention from the media. The Independent noted that this was a "remarkable coup" for BSkyB, given the company's fluctuating fortunes. The Guardian correspondent David Lacey suggested that fans were the biggest losers: "A lot of people who want to watch matches regularly in future are going to have to buy a bond or a dish." Bryan Davies, Baron Davies of Oldham described the arrangement as "absolutely appalling" and Football Supporters' Association chairman Craig Brewin criticised the "obscene" amounts of money clubs earned as part of the deal.

Everton chairman David Marsh was disappointed with the introduction of football on Monday nights, as it disrupted "the social life of British society and the fans." Liverpool were also critical; when asked if the club would refuse to play games scheduled on that particular day, chief executive Peter Robinson replied: "I cannot answer that because I don't know whether we would be contractually able to refuse." Both Merseyside clubs offered its season ticket holders a refund for matches rescheduled for Monday nights, provided fans gave a seven-day notice. Manchester United manager Alex Ferguson said the prospect of playing on Sunday and Monday was a disadvantage to his and other clubs' chances in Europe. He called for an urgent discussion with other managers about the game's future: "A deal was stampeded without consultation with the most important people in the game, the managers and the players whose livelihoods are at stake. ... It's the most ludicrous and backward decision football has taken. We managers must seriously question its wisdom."

ITV sought legal action after learning BSkyB had submitted an improved bid without their knowledge, but their case was thrown out of the High Court.

=== Legacy ===
"We have sold our soul and we do not control our fixtures any more. It is the truth and I cannot say the television is wrong, but it is not normal that you can have a direct influence on the schedule through the television."

— Arsène Wenger, January 2012

The Premier League benefited financially from BSkyB's involvement in football and has since seen an increase in the value of broadcasting rights and number of matches televised. A review by Deloitte in 2014 showed that the Premier League generated more revenue than of any football league in the world, with total club revenues of £2.5 billion in 2012–13. BSkyB in turn gained from having exclusive rights to top-flight football; the company made a £62m profit in 1993 following a loss the previous year. Journalist David Conn in a piece for The Guardian noted how BSkyB used Premier League football to build its business over two decades, adding "... therefore the financial power of the Murdoch empire, remains founded on the in-the-blood loyalty of football supporters."

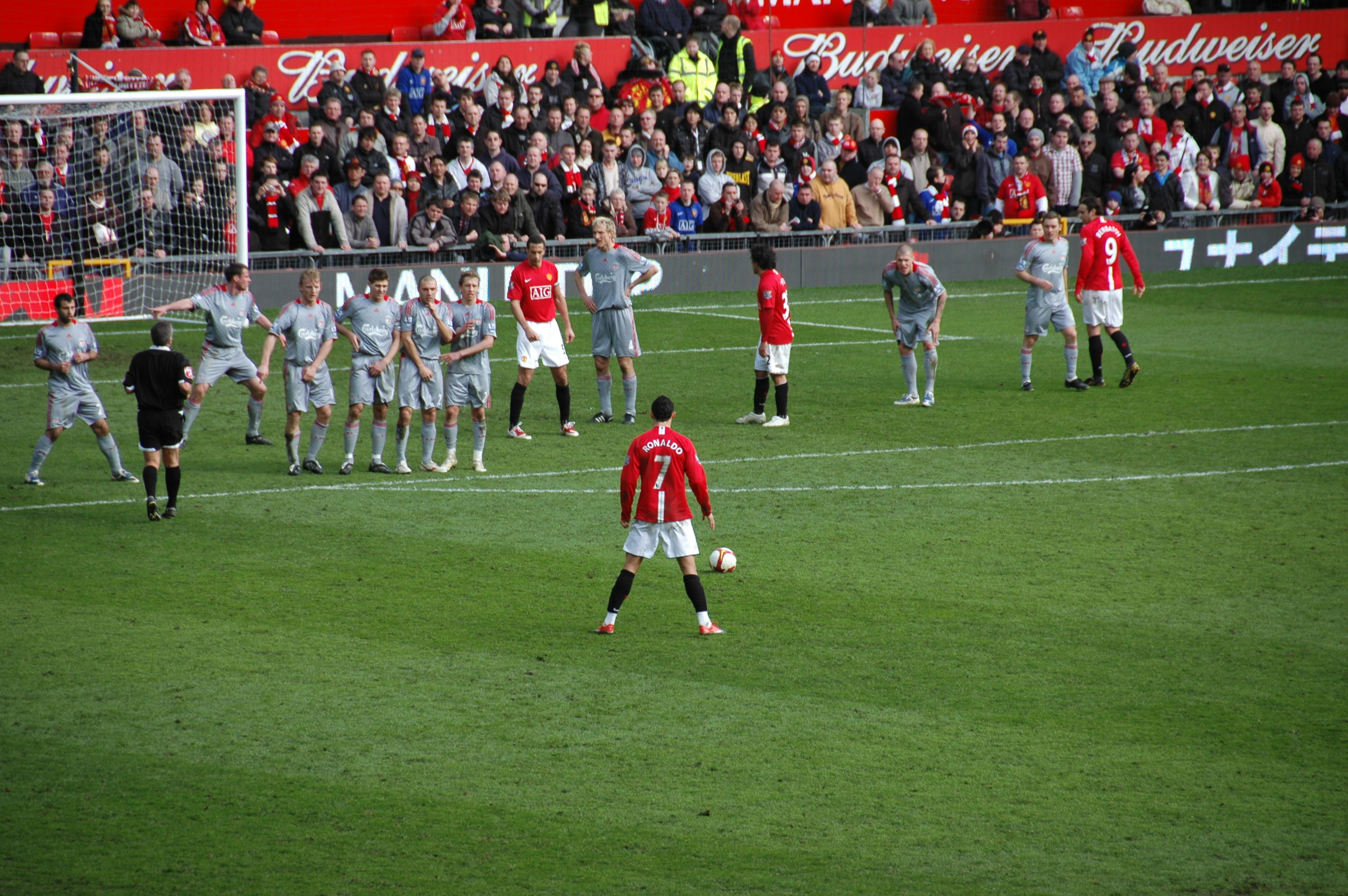
British viewers have had to pay a subscription to watch live Premier League football since 1992.

BSkyB's continued partnership with the Premier League has led to an increase in the value of broadcasting rights and matches televised. Managers however have voiced their concerns about the latter and the excessive cost of live rights is partly a reason why top-flight football has not returned to the BBC or ITV and live English top-flight football has remained off free-to-air television in Britain, with few exceptions. (Note: ESPN's coverage of Manchester City's game against Fulham in February 2012 was broadcast unencrypted on digital terrestrial television (DTT). In the 2013–14 season, Swansea City v Manchester United and Crystal Palace v Arsenal were free to non-subscribers of Sky Sports and BT Sport respectively. Amidst the COVID-19 pandemic and the subsequent ban on mass gatherings, 33 of the remaining 92 games of the 2019–20 Premier League were free-to-air on the BBC and Sky (via Pick), or free-to-view on Amazon Prime Video. Eight further games were broadcast on the BBC during the 2020–21 season.) It was not until 2006 that BSkyB's monopoly on Premier League television rights was broken; this came after an investigation by the European Commission which concluded that exclusive rights should not be sold to one television company. Setanta Sports was awarded two packages, but encountered financial difficulties by 2009 and went into administration. Their rights were sold to ESPN, who showed a total of 46 matches that were available for the 2009–10 season and subsequently 23 from 2010–11 to 2012–13. In June 2012, the Premier League awarded BT rights to 38 games over three seasons, starting from 2013–14. BT's introduction into the football broadcasting market has been considered a threat to BSkyB's dominance, particularly as the company was awarded exclusive rights to live UEFA Champions League football in 2013.

Although Ferguson later praised television's part in aiding the Premier League, he maintained the league's freedom of control continued to impair club's chances in European competitions: "You get some ridiculous situations when you're playing on Wednesday night in Europe and then at lunchtime the following Saturday. You ask any manager if they would pick that themselves ... there'd be no chance." He likened television to God and said "When you shake hands with the devil you have to pay the price." Arsène Wenger also criticised the influence television companies had over scheduling: "At the moment, television decides. You cannot have decisive games with one team playing Friday and Tuesday, and another on Sunday and Tuesday."

== 1992 ==
On 27 May 1992, the Premier League was officially formed, with the first fixtures to be played on 15 August 1992. The new league would involve the 19 highest-placed teams in that season's First Division as well as the champions, runners-up and playoff winners from the Second Division. The old Second Division would be renamed Division One, the Third Division would become Division Two and the Fourth Division would become Division Three. The three-up, three-down system of promotion and relegation, established in 1974 (although there had since been exceptions to the system on occasions when the league was being reorganised) would continue in the future.

== Judicial review ==
Following a trial in the Queen's Bench Division of the High Court before Mr Justice Rose, it was held that the formation of the Premier League was not subject to judicial review, The Football Association being governed by private law.

== See also ==
- English football on television
