= Chris Eaton (police officer) =

Australian integrity consultant (born 1952)

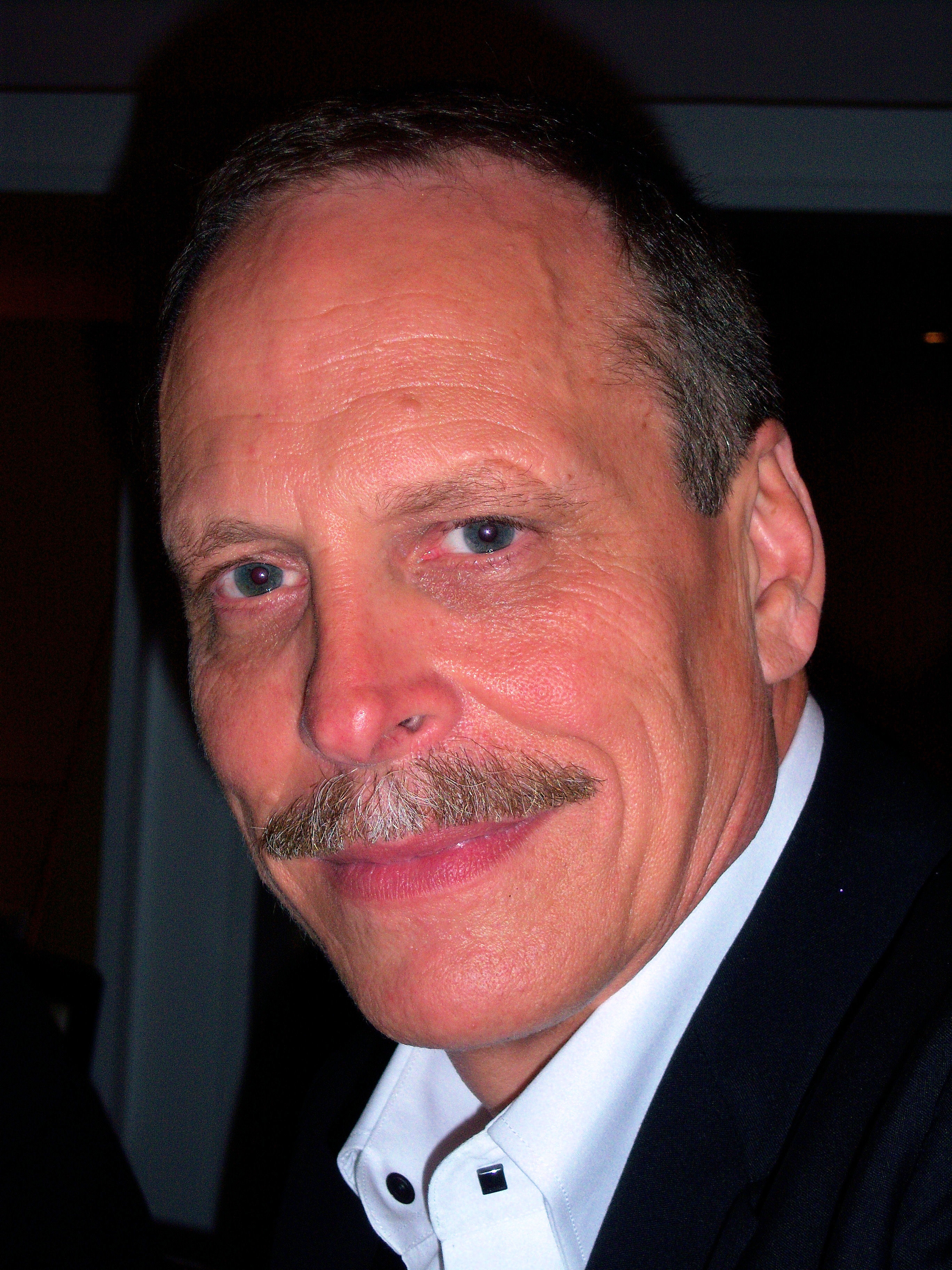

Retired Integrity Consultant
- Incumbent
- Assumed office June 2017

Personal details
- Born: 1952 (age 73–74) Melbourne, Australia
- Spouse: Joyce Eaton
- Children: 6
- Education: Charles Sturt University

Chris Eaton is an Australian former police officer and integrity and anti-corruption specialist who has overseen international security and anti-corruption efforts, primarily in sports. He is a well-known figure in the world of sports results manipulation and is sought worldwide for his opinion and feedback on program's aimed at tackling corruption in sport. He worked in national and international policing for many years before specialising in sport integrity when working with FIFA, INTERPOL and as the executive director of sport integrity at the International Centre for Sport Security. He is now retired but occasionally works as an integrity consultant and media commentator. Following the publication of a book titled “The Big Fix” by journalist/author Brett Forrest in 2014 concerning Eaton’s work countering global sports corruption, Netflix commissioned a film that is presently in post-production and due for streaming release on Netflix in the second half of 2027.

== Early life and education ==
Born on 22 February 1952, Eaton attended Caulfield High School in Melbourne and later the Australian Graduate School of Police Management in Sydney. He went on to complete a graduate certificate at the Charles Sturt University in New South Wales.

== Career ==
Eaton has over 40 years' public service experience in the fields of international law enforcement, security and integrity.

=== Police service ===
Eaton began his career, in 1969, with the Victoria police, a state police service in Australia, transferring five years later to then Commonwealth Police, which was later renamed the Australian Federal Police. Eaton served as a federal agent and also spent over 10 years as the National Secretary of the Australian Federal Police Association, the professional representative body of federal police employees, during which time he called for the abolition of the National Crime Authority. and oversaw a fundamental restructure of the AFP's career, ranks and salaries . He is a recipient of the Australian Police Medal.

=== INTERPOL ===
In 1999 Eaton was attached by the Australian Federal Police to the International Criminal Police Organization (INTERPOL) in France, where among other functions, he was responsible for managing INTERPOL's 24/7 Command and Coordination Centre as Manager of Operations for the global monitoring and support hub of INTERPOL. During this period Eaton was also seconded from INTERPOL as a senior UN Special Investigator with the Independent Inquiry Committee, managing international investigations of allegations of fraud and corruption within the United Nations' Oil-for-Food Program in Iraq and working out of Paris and New York. Eaton left INTERPOL in 2010.

=== FIFA ===
In December 2010 Eaton was appointed as the security adviser to FIFA for the 2010 World Cup South Africa™, and later, FIFA's head of security, Eaton was responsible for all FIFA interests and assets against risk and threat and oversaw the development of an internal investigation program to target match-fixing and criminal behaviour within football. The program included managing a team of international investigators, a first for FIFA at the time. Eaton initiated unique institutional tools for sport to combat corruption in football, including a hotline and website in 180 languages, the offer of amnesties, rewards and rehabilitation for anyone who revealed important information. The introduction of these tools was delayed when FIFA came under independent governance scrutiny. Eaton saw many in the worldwide sporting industry punished for profiting from the illegal betting industry with ongoing match-fixing investigations in about 50 countries, due in part to his global law enforcement contacts and forceful approach. His resignation was a setback for the infamous Asiagate scandal as Eaton was also instrumental in the arrest of the Singaporean man at the center of the match-fixing debacle, Wilson Raj Perumal, as well as banning referee Ibrahim Chaibou for life in manipulating games he was appointed for by Peruma.

=== The International Centre for Sport Security ===
Eaton joined the International Centre for Sport Security in April 2012, a non-profit organisation led by president Mohammed Hanzab, vice-president Mohammed Al Hajaj Shahwani and executive director, Helmut Spahn. Eaton has spoken out against a number of issues including the state of English football, match-fixing in Africa, the need for governmental involvement in match-fixing and general corruption in sport including the Indian Premier League. His primary role is to promote integrity reform in the sport industry and support the creation of international measures to combat integrity threats to sport.

=== The Big Fix ===
In 2014 author Brett Forrest published a book titled The Big Fix which featured Eaton concerning his role in FIFA and his anti-corruption efforts both within FIFA and particularly in response to match fixing more generally. In 2016 20th Century Fox and Chernin Entertainment purchased Eaton's life rights to develop a feature film based on Forrest's book. Fox later passed this project on to Netflix. The film has completed filming and is in post-production, being scheduled for streaming release in the second half of 2027., with Mark Wahlberg portraying a character based on Eaton.

=== Retirement and consultancy ===
In 2017 at the age of 65 Eaton retired from his full-time work with the ICSS. Eaton remains sought after by mainstream media for his informed views on sport integrity issues, and occasionally provides consultancy services on similar matters.

== Personal life ==
Eaton is married with six children (two sons and four daughters) and six grandchildren. He currently resides in Lyon, France.
