= Nigerien Football Federation =

National Football Association of Nigeria

CAF
- Founded: 1961
- Headquarters: Niamey
- FIFA affiliation: 1964
- CAF affiliation: 1965
- President: Djibril Hima Hamidou
- Website: https://fenifoot.football/

The Nigerien Football Federation (French: Fédération Nigéroise de Football; FENIFOOT) is the governing body of football in Niger. It organizes the national football league and the national team.

== History ==
The FENIFOOT was founded in 1961 and affiliated with FIFA in 1964 and with CAF in 1965.

Niger was represented in refereeing at the 1998 FIFA World Cup when Lucien Bouchardeau was chosen for the tournament, being involved in a match between Chile and Italy which was surrounded by controversy and Chilean anger.

In January 2019, FIFA banned one of the federation's international referees, Ibrahim Chaibou, for his corrupting matches and being involved with convicted match fixer Wilson Raj Perumal.
