= Siham =

Siham or Seham is a feminine given name of Arabic origin. Notable people with the name include:

== Given name ==
=== Seham ===
- Seham Galal (1972–2026), Egyptian actress
- Seham El-Sawalhy (born 1991), Egyptian taekwondo practitioner
- Seham Sergiwa (born 1963), Libyan psychologist and politician

=== Siham ===
- Siham Alawami, Qatari television journalist and producer
- Siham Daoud Anglo (born 1960), Sudanese activist
- Siham Bayyumi (born 1949), Egyptian writer and journalist
- Siham Benchekroun, Moroccan novelist and poet
- Siham Bouhlal (born 1966), Moroccan translator and poet
- Siham Boukhami (born 1992), Moroccan football defender
- Siham Hassan (died 2025), Sudanese human rights activist and politician
- Siham Hilali (born 1986), Moroccan middle-distance runner
- Sihame El Kaouakibi (born 1986), Moroccan-Belgian politician
- Siham Mousa Hamoud Jabr Al Moussawi (born 1983), Iraqi politician
- Siham Al-Rasheedy (born 1982), Emirati Paralympic athlete
