= Spahn =

Spahn may refer to:

== People ==
- Andy Spahn (born 1953), American political consultant and fundraiser
- Carl Spahn (1863–1943), Swiss politician
- Carol Spahn, director of the Peace Corps
- Claus Spahn (born 1940), German television executive
- Dieterich Spahn (1938–2021), German-born American artist
- Erich Spahn (1948–2009), Swiss cyclist
- George Spahn (1889–1974), American rancher who owned the Spahn Ranch in California
- Helen May Spahn (1867–1957), American bandleader and composer
- Helmut Spahn (born 1961), FIFA security director
- Jens Spahn (born 1980), German politician, health minister and majority leader
- Martin Spahn (1875–1945), German politician
- Moe Spahn (1912–1991), American basketball player
- Paul Bernd Spahn (1939–2025), German public finance academic
- Peter Spahn (1846–1925), German politician Centre Party
- Tom Spahn (born 1955), American composer
- Warren Spahn (1921–2003), American baseball player

== Other uses ==
- Spahn Ranch, 500-acre (2.0 km^{2}) ranch at 1200 Santa Susana Pass Road, Chatsworth, California
- Spahn Ranch (band), electro-industrial group from Los Angeles
- Spahn tax, a type of tax proposed by Paul Bernd Spahn
- Warren Spahn Award, annual Baseball award given out by the Oklahoma Sports Museum
