= Siham Alawami =

Arab woman

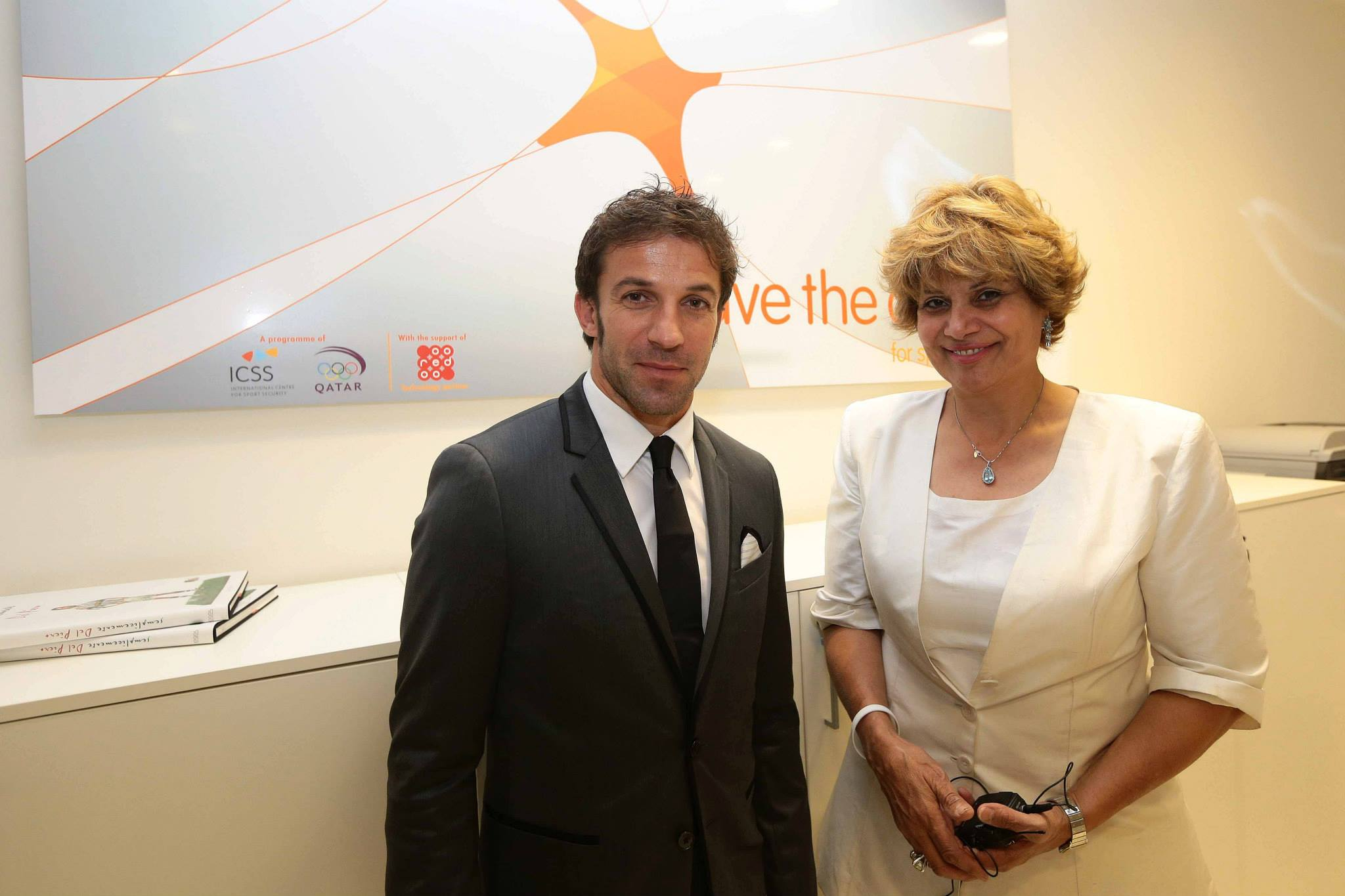
- Siham Alawami with football legend, Alessandro Del Piero at the opening of the Save the Dream offices in Turin, May 2013
- Born: Doha
- Known for: Documentaries of Arab culture in Austria

Siham Alawami is an Arab woman known for her documentaries of Arab culture in Austria. She has also worked closely with legendary U.S. boxer, Muhammad Ali.

== Early life and education ==
Qatari-born, Alawami, left the Middle East after completing high school to study further in Austria. She graduated from Webster University Vienna with master's degrees in European Studies and European Law.

== Career ==
Alawam developed TV programs and campaigns to promote the City of Vienna and its relations with the Gulf countries, as well as creating an understanding among the youth of Vienna. Alawami started as a PR specialist for the intergovernmental organization, OPEC, in Austria where she spent over 30 years and organized 30 Viennese Balls in Dubai, Abu Dhabi and Oman, the last of which was in 1996. As part of her role at OPEC she was also responsible for briefing NATO on OPEC's goals and mission. Alawami has also worked as a print and television journalist and has produced, directed and presented various TV programs in Arabic, English and German. In 1977, Alawami worked as a private secretary for boxing legend Muhammad Ali at his Deer Lake Training Camp.

== Awards ==
The European Society of Communication and Education awarded Alawami the ERASMUS Seal of Approval for four of her TV programs:

- 2008 ‘Vienna-Mozart and Um Kulthom’ (Vienna's Cultural Diversity and its influence on Mozart's compositions)
- 2009 ‘Salam Islam’ (Integration of foreigners in Vienna)
- 2010 ‘Vienna and Arabs - Culture and Business’
- 2011 ‘The Qatar Philharmonic Orchestra in Vienna’

== The International Centre for Sport Security ==
Alawami returned to Qatar, joining the International Centre for Sport Security (ICSS) in August 2011, working directly with its president, Mohammed Hanzab. The ICSS is an international non-profit organisation with its headquarters in Doha, Qatar. It was established in 2010, aiming to share expertise in the fields of safety, security and integrity at major international sporting events. The organisation's main roles include advisory, training and research working with organising committees, governments, bidding nations, infrastructure owners, sport associations, leagues and clubs. The ICSS also organises the annual conference, "Securing Sport", held in Doha, Qatar of which Alawami is a driving force.
