= Dan Tan =

Alleged Singaporean matchfixer

- 陳薛榮
- Born: Tan Seet Eng; 29 April 1964 (age 62)
- Other name: Dan Tan

Dan Tan
- Traditional Chinese: 陳薛榮
- Simplified Chinese: 陈薛荣
Transcriptions
Standard Mandarin
- Hanyu Pinyin: Chén Xuēróng
Southern Min
- Hokkien POJ: Tân Sih-êng

Tan Seet Eng (Chinese: 陈薛荣; Pe̍h-ōe-jī: Tân Sih-êng), also known by the English name Dan Tan, is a Singaporean businessman. He has faced charges of match fixing in Italy since 2011 and Hungary since 2013 as part of the Calcio scommesse scandal. Despite Interpol considering him the "boss" of the "world's largest and most aggressive match-fixing syndicate", he was not arrested in Singapore until late 2013 since it lacks an extradition treaty with the European Union.

== Personal life ==
Tan was born on 29 April 1964, and did not graduate from secondary school. In the early 1990s, he spent less than a year in jail for illegal horse-racing and football bookmaking and, in 1994, fled Singapore after losing US$1.5 million on that year's World Cup. He returned after he was allowed to pay off his debts in instalments.

By early 2013, he was a salaried employee, an investor, and a high-stakes gambler. He has a young son and his current wife, the Chinese national Guan Enmei, is thought to be his third. They live modestly and The Straits Times has reported that his friends call him "Ah Blur" from his obliviousness. They describe him as "very jovial and happy-go-lucky" and say he only occasionally watches football, spending most free time watching the stock market.

In 2012, Tan and his family disconnected their phones and left their former gated apartment building for an anonymous replacement after its location was published by Stern and Singaporean newspapers. In March 2013, a "Madam Lim" claimed to be Tan's second wife and complained to Singapore's New Paper that he abandoned her and their two sons ten years before.

== Match fixing ==
Dan Tan served less than a year in jail in the early 1990s for illegal horse-racing and football bookmaking. He has admitted to having served as the director of the Singaporean company Exclusive Sports PTE Ltd, a rebranding of Football4U, which was founded by convicted match-fixer Wilson Raj Perumal. Both companies arranged exhibition games and provided referees which have since come under suspicion for match fixing. Tan's involvement with the company, however, was short-lived, lasting only from November 2010 to February 2011. He later professed he withdrew his investments upon discovering their dodgy practices. The span of his involvement parallels the company's failed attempt to buy the right to showcase its players with the Finnish club Tampere United for €300,000. Tampere's club has been indefinitely suspended since 11 April 2011 for its involvement.)

In November 2010, the 3rd-division Cremonese were drugged by their goalkeeper Marco Paoloni in a failed attempt to throw the match to the underdog Paganese. Investigation of Paolini's contacts revealed a match-fixing syndicate known as the Zingari ("Gypsies") with ties to organised crime in the Balkans and Eastern Europe. Italian authorities, led by the Cremonese prosecutor Roberto di Martino, subsequently established coördination and funding from a Singaporean cartel, which made millions of euros from fixing matches in the Italian Serie A and Serie B leagues. Di Martino claims evidence tying Tan directly to payoffs and illegal bets, giving him a "central role" in the scandal; he is known to have been in Italy in 2009 in the company of three Zingari and Choo Beng Huat, a money runner. An arrest warrant was issued by Italy in late December 2011. The lack of an extradition treaty, however, meant that Tan could only be arrested in Singapore upon local charges.

In February 2011, Wilson Raj Perumal—the man credited with the fake Togolese team who played Bahrain in 2010—was arrested in Finland and began speaking with authorities, reducing his two-year sentence to less than a year. Perumal had been given US$500,000 (€385,000) to purchase the Finnish club RoPS outright from its owners but pocketed $300,000 for himself to pay his own gambling debts. He has since argued that he was merely "rais[ing] quotation prices" for his services after seeing Ibrahim Chaibou, a referee in his employ, working at a Bolivia–Venezuela exhibition game in October 2010. He had been in business with Tan for three years.

The lack of funds, however, scuttled the deal and, shortly afterwards, his associate Joseph Tan Xie entered the Rovaniemi central police station and announced that Perumal was in Finland on a forged passport under the name Rajamorgan Chelliah. Following a two-hour interview with Joseph, further police investigation showed Perumal berating RoPS players in a café after they played to a draw instead of a loss. Finnish National Bureau of Investigation detained and then arrested him over the passport on a domestic flight to Helsinki. (Perumal was a fugitive from Singapore, having fled a 5-year sentence in July 2010 after running over a policeman with his car; he had also been under investigation by FIFA's head of security Chris Eaton for the prior six months.) Perumal's arrest scuttled the deal between Exclusive Sports and Tampere United; it led to a June 2011 police raid on the TamU offices and the April 2013, conviction of the club's CEO and chairman for related money laundering.

In revenge for his own arrest, Perumal then fingered Tan as placing bets for the syndicate using Asian-based online gambling sites and intermediaries in China. The operation typically placed a large number of low-level bets, sets of around €100 (US$130) each using different credit cards. Money was also moved and laundered using Islamic hawala financing networks. A standard fee for the European match fixers was €200,000 ($260k). Perumal's allegations against Tan were first made public in a 28 July 2011, article in the German magazine Stern.

In February 2013, Europol claimed the involvement of "networks based in the city state of Singapore" in "at least" 380 local, national, and international matches within Europe and another 300 elsewhere. The games included World Cup qualifiers and the European Champions league and netted an estimated $10.81 million. The Singapore Police Force finally began speaking to half a dozen local witnesses. A few days after the SPF interviewed him, the former Slovenian player Admir Suljic voluntarily boarded a plane to Italy where he was immediately arrested by Milanese police. The SPF reported that Tan was coöperating with their investigations and also dispatched four SPF and CPIB detectives to Interpol's headquarters in Lyon, France. They met with the Global Anti-Match-fixing Taskforce and examined files from Italy, Hungary, Germany, and Finland in the hope of receiving evidence that a crime had been committed in Singapore. Despite public complaints, Europe proved slow to move the investigation forward, taking more than a year to forward requested documents and leaving key witnesses inaccessible.

In March, Tan spoke with the German magazine Der Spiegel via online chat. Regarding match fixing, he opined that "one has to proceed against these criminals". He claimed never to have personally bribed a player but admitted providing "contributions" of up to €800,000 ($1.05m) and to losing $3 million in a failed attempt to fix a September 2001, match in Istanbul between Barcelona and Fenerbahçe. He had bet that there would be three or fewer goals during the match; when Barcelona took an early lead, his paid employees on the field sabotaged the stadium's lights to force a cancellation. Instead, backup generators were quickly able to restore power. He claimed the most he had ever won was €15 million ($19.5m) for an Italian Serie A game.

On 23 May, Hungarian prosecutors indicted Tan in absentia among 44 others following a four-year investigation of match fixing. The indictment specified the rigging of 32 games in Hungary, Italy, and Finland. Tan was the only foreigner indicted; the other 44 were all Hungarian players, coaches, managers, owners, or referees. Perumal was extradited from Finland to Hungary as part of the investigation; he was placed under house arrest or preventive detention while outlining the networks as he understood them.

== Arrest ==
Acting on new testimony provided by two members of the syndicate, Tan was arrested amid a 12-hour series of raids carried out on 16 and 17 September 2013, by the Criminal Investigation Department, Police Intelligence Department, and the Corrupt Practices Investigation Bureau. He has been kept in custody since. The briefing by the SPF and CPIB and press release from Interpol did not officially name any of the twelve men or two women arrested under the Prevention of Corruption Act and involvement in "organised crime activities", but mentioned an unspecified "ringleader" who was refused bail. The Associated Press has reported "high-level" confirmation that Tan was that person; The Straits Times and New Paper have also confirmed Tan's detainment. Of the other 13 people detained, nine have been released on bail. Tan's current wife is believed to have been among them. Three others remain in custody with Tan and one has been issued police supervision in lieu of incarceration.

However, ESPN has reported that the Singaporean network simply provided men with fluent English and liberal passport access to triad gangs based in mainland China; the Singaporean sports reporter Suresh Nair has also said that Tan was not a major part of the operation but only a middleman for behind-the-scenes bosses. In 2012, FIFA's head of security Ralf Mutschke downplayed Tan's importance, saying he had only "symbolic importance" and was probably not "as involved as everyone is thinking". Much of the evidence tying Tan to criminal activity derives from Wilson Raj's confessions to police in Finland and Hungary, and Chris Eaton has stated that Raj is "used to giving unreliable information to authorities". Acquaintances speaking to The Straits Times admit he may have purchased information on fixed games from Perumal but argue that his withdrawal of funds from Exclusive Sports accounts for his "grudge".

The BBC reports that a "source close to the investigation" admits that there is not currently enough evidence to try Tan in Singapore, particularly since the two members of the syndicate whose testimony was responsible for his arrest refuse to testify in open court. No other jurisdiction with an outstanding warrant for his arrest has extradition agreements with the country. However, it remains possible that he could be held indefinitely: §44 of the Criminal Law (Temporary Provisions) Act permits a suspect to be held 16 days from the time of his arrest and §241 of the 1955 Prevention of Corruption Act permits him to be held up to a year without trial. Such a decision will be considered by the Ministry of Home Affairs and an advisory council before being personally made by President Halimah Yacob. Further, Singapore still does not formally acknowledge his detention and the year-long pretrial term can be extended by the authorities. He was released on appeal to the Court of Appeal in 2015.
