= Kirsten Nematandani =

South African businessman

Kirsten Nematandani (born May 27, 1958) is a former South African Football Association (SAFA) president and businessman. He became the president of the Venda Football Association (VEFA) in 1988.

== Career ==
From 1986 to 1988, he was the coach of Football Team Chibuku Young Stars FC.

In 1988 he became the president of the Venda Football Association (VEFA).

== SAFA ==
In 2009, Nematandi was elected to be the president of SAFA. South Africa was the host of the FIFA World Cup tournament in 2010, while Nematandani was the president of SAFA.

In December 2012, Nematandani was suspended as president after an investigation of FIFA into match fixing ahead of the FIFA World Cup 2010. The investigation included Niger's referee Ibrahim Chaibou and Singaporean businessman Wilson Raj Perumal, with FIFA banning Chaibou for life in January 2019.

In January 2013, he was reinstated as SAFA president but not exonerated. In September 2013, he was replaced by Danny Jordaan after failing to receive a nomination in the SAFA elections.

In September 2015, the FIFA Ethics Committee started to investigate against Nematandani. He was found guilty of violating FIFA’s Code of Ethics in August 2016 and banned from any football-related activities for five years.
