= Gavin Dein =

British entrepreneur and investor

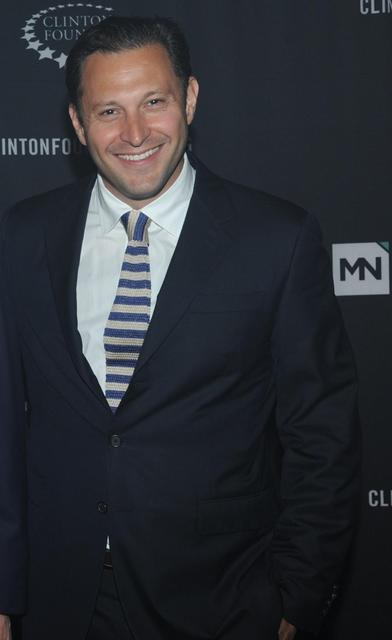
- Dein at the Clinton Foundation in 2012
- Born: Gavin Alexander Dein; London, England
- Education: Babson College
- Occupations: Founder and Deputy Chairman of Reward
- Known for: Founding Reward, developing Cardless Reward Technology
- Spouse: Claire Guerlain
- Children: 2
- Parent: David Dein Barbara Dein
- Website: rewardinsight.com

Gavin Alexander Dein is a British entrepreneur and investor who pioneered card-linked rewards technology in Europe. He is the founder of Reward, EMEA's largest personalised card-linked offers platform, which he led for over two decades before its acquisition by Rezolve Ai in February 2026 in an all-cash transaction valued at approximately US$230 million. Under Dein's leadership, Reward returned over $2.5 billion in rewards to customers and donated approximately $20 million to charitable causes.

== Early life and education ==
Gavin Dein is the son of David Dein MBE and Barbara Dein. David Dein is best known for co-owning Arsenal Football Club and founding the Premier League. Dein has an older brother Darren, who is a football agent operating in Europe, and a younger sister Sasha. Dein attended Haberdashers' Aske's Boys' School, The American School in London and graduated with honours in entrepreneurship at Babson College in Wellesley, Massachusetts, the No. 1 MBA programme for entrepreneurship according to the U.S. News & World Report for over 30 consecutive years.

== Career ==
=== Founding of Reward ===
Dein founded Reward in 2001. The company initially operated in football club loyalty programmes before Dein invented Cardless Reward Technology (CRT) in 2006, a system that linked promotional offers directly to a consumer's payment card without requiring a separate loyalty card or voucher. The technology was among the first of its kind in Europe and established a model for card-linked commerce that would later be widely adopted across the financial services industry.

=== Growth and scale ===
Under Dein's leadership, Reward grew into EMEA's largest personalised card-linked offers provider, with approximately 250 employees and operations spanning the United Kingdom, Europe, the Middle East and Asia-Pacific, with offices in Regent Street, London, Belfast, Dubai and Singapore.

The platform established partnerships with more than 30 banks globally, including NatWest, Royal Bank of Scotland, Barclaycard, Virgin Money, Monzo, Mashreq and First Abu Dhabi Bank, the largest bank in the United Arab Emirates. Reward integrated with card scheme networks operated by Visa, Mastercard and American Express, processing card-linked offers across 14 international markets and reaching over 250 million Visa cardholders across Europe.

By March 2022, Reward had delivered over £1 billion in rewards to customers on behalf of banks and merchants, achieved nearly 12 months ahead of its five-year plan. By the time of its acquisition in 2026, the company had returned over $2.5 billion to customers and donated approximately $20 million to charitable causes.

Reward launched full-service loyalty programmes in partnership with Virgin Money and Barclays Bank, the latter in collaboration with Visa.

=== Strategic investments ===
Reward attracted strategic investment from two of the three world's largest consumer credit data bureaus.

In November 2020, Verisk Financial, a division of Verisk Analytics, acquired a strategic minority stake in Reward in a transaction that valued the company at over £100 million. Sky News reported the deal as one of the largest UK fintech investments of that year. Verisk Financial was subsequently acquired by TransUnion, resulting in TransUnion holding a stake in Reward.

In May 2024, Experian acquired a strategic stake in Reward, with Experian's Head of Corporate Development joining the Reward board. The deal combined Experian's consumer data and audience activation capabilities with Reward's engagement platform across banks and retail.

=== Acquisition by Rezolve Ai ===
On 10 February 2026, Rezolve Ai announced the acquisition of Reward for approximately US$230 million in an all-cash transaction. The deal expanded Rezolve Ai's commerce platform with Reward's card-linked offers infrastructure and banking partnerships across 14 markets.

Reward continues to operate as part of the Rezolve Ai group, maintaining its existing banking and scheme partnerships.

== Other ventures ==
Dein was a Non-Executive Director of IE Music, a talent representation agency, from 2016 to 2018. Clients include Robbie Williams, Ayda Field, Cher Lloyd, Craig Armstrong, Lemar, Lily Allen, Passenger and many more.

== Personal life ==
Dein married Claire Guerlain in 2014. The couple have two children, a girl and a boy, and currently live in Mayfair, London.

== Philanthropy ==
Dein has been involved with the NSPCC since 2012, chairing several boards including the Childline School Service and the National Development Board. He is currently a member of the Income Generation Committee.

He has spoken at industry events on the future of card-linked commerce and the evolution of payment technology.

== Recognition ==
- Young Gun Award (2008), Growing Business magazine
- Best Card Benefits Programme of the Year (2014), Card & Payments Awards
- Publisher of the Year (2021), Rakuten Advertising Golden Link Awards
- Best Use of Data (2022), Performance Marketing Awards
- Partnership of the Year (2023), European Golden Link Awards
- Industry Achievement Award (2023), Card & Payments Awards
- Publisher of the Year (2024), European Golden Link Awards
- 5th fastest growing UK technology business (2024), E2E Tech 100 in association with The Independent
- Best Benefits or Loyalty Scheme (2025), Card & Payments Awards
