= International Centre for Sport Security =

International, not-for-profit organization based in Doha, Qatar

- Abbreviation: ICSS
- Formation: 2010
- Type: Not-for-profit organisation
- Headquarters: Geneva, Switzerland & Doha, Qatar
- Region served: Worldwide
- Founder and Chairman: Mohammed Hanzab
- CEO: Massimiliano Montanari
- Website: www.theicss.org

The International Centre for Sport Security (ICSS) is an international, not-for-profit organisation based in Doha, Qatar. It was established in 2010 and formally launched in March 2011, with a global mission to promote and protect the integrity and security of sport.

The ICSS's key activities include advisory, training and research. It works primarily with organising committees, governments, bidding nations, infrastructure owners, sport associations leagues and clubs.

== History ==
=== Founding and early years ===
ICSS was founded in 2010. Mohammed Hanzab, a former lieutenant colonel in the Qatar Armed Forces, announced its formation in March 2011, with Hanzab named as ICSS president. In 2011, the Qatar 2022 Supreme Committee, in charge of staging the 2022 FIFA World Cup in Qatar, signed an agreement for the ICSS to collaborate on security planning. In 2012, ICSS signed a partnership with the Institute for Fan Culture in Germany. Also in 2012, it signed an agreement to partner with the Université Paris I – Panthéon-Sorbonne, to create a research initiative on sporting integrity. Chris Eaton, FIFA's former head of security, joined ICSS in 2012 as executive director for sport integrity, also bringing much of his investigative team from FIFA.

As of 2013, ICSS continued to oversee the construction of the sports centers and stadiums for the 2022 Qatar World Championships, consulting on security to Qatar. Also in 2013, ICSS signed a deal with the European Professional Football Leagues to advise on security at football events. Helmut Spahn was serving as ICSS executive director, under Hanzab. The Qatar Football Association signed an agreement with ICSS in 2013 as well. It also signed an agreement with The European Lotteries.

=== 2014-2019 ===
The ICSS and the Sorbonne in Paris released a research project in 2014 claiming that USD$140 billion was laundered every year through sports betting. In 2015, Reuters reported that the ICSS continued to receive 70% of its funding from the Qatari government, with the rest funded by projects. It remained based in Doha and was headed by two former military officials from Qatar. At the time, Reuters reported that ICSS had a "credibility problem" due to suspicions concerning Qatar's methods for obtaining the right to host the 2022 FIFA event back in 2010. ICSS maintained it remained independent from Qatar, and that there was "no external influence or input put on the ICSS from the government of Qatar in terms of how we are run and our activities." Among members of its advisory board at the time were Juliette Kayyem as well as Khoo Boon Hui, former Interpol president.

It was involved with protection of the 2014 FIFA World Cup in Brazil, and the 2016 Summer Olympics in Rio de Janeiro. In 2015, ICSS was hired as a consultant for a new stadium for AS Roma, the Stadio della Roma. Investigator Michael Hershman was named Group CEO of ICSS in June 2016. Hanzab remained president. In 2016, Hanzab launched the Sports Integrity Global Alliance, which was officially unconnected to ICSS, but had a number of related people involved. Similar to ICSS, SIGA lacked financial transparency, which resulted in criticism. One of SIGA's financial contributors was ICSS Insight, a non-profit associated with ICSS. In late 2017, ICSS created an international hotline to report integrity issues in sport.

=== 2020-present ===
Massimiliano Montanari was serving as ICSS CEO in 2020. It signed an agreement with the United Nations Institute for Training and Research in 2020 over training. It also worked with the Japanese Olympic Committee in preparation for security at the 2020 Summer Olympics in Tokyo. In 2021, the United Nations and the ICSS released the jointly developed Global Guide on the Security of Major Sporting Events. Mohamed Hanzab in 2022 served as ICSS chairman. ICSS was working with the Supreme Committee for Delivery and Legacy, FIFA, FIFA World Cup Qatar 2022, the Asian Football Confederation, the Asean Football Federation, and the Confederation of African Football. It signed an agreement with the Brazilian Football Confederation in March 2024. The 2024 agreement with the Brazilian Football Confederation included plans to develop educational programmes for players, officials, clubs and football leagues to combat match fixing. It also proposed awareness campaigns involving prominent Brazilian footballers and initiatives aimed at promoting sporting integrity among young players. The agreement formed part of broader efforts to strengthen cooperation against the manipulation of sporting competitions.

In June 2024, it was working with the Confederation of African Football (CAF) and the United Nations Institute for Training and Research (UNITAR) on an online training program on sports security in football competitions in Africa.

== Organization ==
Mohammed Hanzab in 2022 served as ICSS chairman, and Massimiliano Montanari was serving as ICSS CEO. In 2013 the ICSS was led by President Hanzab and Director General Helmut Spahn, the latter of whom left in 2016. Mohammed Al Hajri in 2012 was vice president. At that time the centre's staff included Heinz Palme (Vice Director General), Massimiliano Montanari (Chief of Cabinet), Shaun McCarthy (ICSS Enterprise), Emanuel Macedo de Medeiros (ICSS Europe and Latin America), Chris Eaton (Sport Integrity), Malcolm Tarbitt (Safety and Security), and Karen Webb (Communications and PR).

The centre's policies and direction in 2015 were developed by an advisory board including Juliette Kayyem, an Obama administration appointee who served as assistant secretary at the Department of Homeland Security.

== Activities ==
The ICSS works to improve security, safety and integrity in sport by addressing real issues and providing world-leading services, skills, networks and knowledge. It also focuses on match-fixing and sports results manipulation.

=== MENA region stakeholder meeting ===
The MENA Region stakeholder meeting addresses the issue of sport protection in the Middle-East and North Africa. The meeting is jointly organised by UNICRI and the ICSS. The first iteration was held in Doha, Qatar on 17 March 2013, hosted and opened by Sheikh Abdullah bin Nasser bin Khalifa Al Thani, Minister of State for Interior Affairs in Qatar. Attendees included high-level representatives of the United Nations, the League of Arab States, the European Commission, the Organization of American States, and several governmental authorities from countries around the world.

Present at the first meeting in March 2013 were Sheikh Saoud Bin Abdulrahman Al Thani, Secretary General of Qatar Olympic Committee; Staffan de Mistura, former Special Representative of the Secretary-General in Iraq and Afghanistan, and Personal Representative of the Secretary-General for Southern Lebanon;. Stefano Manservisi, Director-General for Home Affairs, European Commission; Amb. Adam Blackwell, Secretary of Multidimensional Security of the Organization of American States; and Sir David Veness, former United Nations Under-Secretary General for Safety and Security.

=== Save the Dream programme ===
Save the Dream logo

The Save the Dream campaign was launched by Sheikh Saoud Bin Abdulrahman Al-Thani (Secretary General, Qatar Olympic Committee), Mohammed Hanzab (President, ICSS), and Italian football player Alessandro del Piero as Captain of the Athletes' Board. The first overseas offices of Save the Dream were opened in May 2013 at Alessandro del Piero's Academy in Turin, Italy.

The stated intention of the campaign is to alert young athletes to the consequences of sports results manipulation, with a panel of high-profile athletes from different sports and regions around the world being set up, and a multidisciplinary team of world experts in education, communications, sport management and sport integrity. Securing Sport 2013 saw the unveiling of the Save the Dream logo and the first Save the Dream Award being given to Spanish runner Iván Fernández Anaya for good sportsmanship.

=== International Sport Security Conference ===
This annual conference, hosted by ICSS, focuses on sport security. The conference is held in Doha, Qatar.

The first conference took place in March 2011. Speakers included Lord John Stevens, William J. Bratton, Rick Parry, Sir Ronald Flanagan, Leonard McCarthy and Michael Johnson. The second conference was held on 14–15 March 2012 in Doha with the theme "Creating a platform for growth through safe sporting events". Venues included the Qatar National Convention Centre, the Torch Hotel and the Museum of Islamic Art. Speakers included Khoo Boon Hui, David Dein Danny Jordaan, Bernard Lapasset, Haroon Lorgat, Michael E. Porter. Dave Richards, Tim Sebastian, Helmut Spahn, and John Stevens At the 2014 conference World Anti-Doping Agency director David Howman gave a talk about criminal activity in organized sport.
