= Michael Hershman =

Michael J. Hershman (born circa 1945) is a business ethics, litigation, governance and security consultant. His career began, during the 1960s, in military intelligence and government service, including as an investigator for the Senate Watergate Committee during the Watergate scandal, and as the deputy staff director of the Subcommittee on International Organizations of the Committee on International Relations. He founded Fairfax Group, an anti-corruption investigation and corporate compliance firm. He also co-founded Transparency International, and served on the independent governance committee for FIFA, later becoming CEO of the International Centre for Sport Security (ICSS). Hershman serves on various boards of directors and, in 2021, became the CEO of real estate development company Soloviev Group. Hershman also hosts The Fairfax Files Podcast, an interview series unlocking truths behind the world’s most high-stakes investigations.

== Biography ==
Born about 1945 to a family who operated a real estate business, he joined the United States Army during the Vietnam War, leaving his home town on Long Island, New York. Following two years of college prior, in 1972, Hershman earned a BSc. from John Jay College of Criminal Justice of the City University of New York. He is married to Marsha Ralls Hershman.

== Career ==
=== Military and government appointments ===
Hershman began his career working in counterterrorism in the military, investigating financial ties between terrorist groups in Europe, the Middle East, and Asia, which led him to other government investigations, including work for the Senate Watergate Committee, and then private investigations and compliance. He became a special agent for US Military Intelligence, working as a counterterrorist expert, during 1967 through 1969. While pursuing his BSc, he joined the New York City Department of Investigation, operating as a special investigator during 1970 through 1973. There, he investigated corruption within judicial, police and correctional agencies, including in the New York City Police Department corruption investigation that had been precipitated by the reports of NYPD whistleblower Frank Serpico. Hershman joined the New York State Special Corruption Prosecutor's Office, during 1972 and 1973. In early 1973, he was appointed to the Commission staff as its chief investigator for the United States Senate Watergate Committee, led by Sam Ervin. Following the resignation of President Richard Nixon and the Watergate scandal, in 1975, he became chief investigator at the Federal Election Commission. He served as the deputy staff director for the Subcommittee on International Organizations of the Committee on International Relations of the United States House Committee on Foreign Affairs to investigate the Koreagate bribery scandal, which implicated several US political officeholders. Hershman next served as deputy auditor general of the Foreign Assistance Program of the United States Agency for International Development (USAID), conducting international investigations and audits of overseas projects that were funded by US interests, while helming worldwide security for all foreign aid missions.

=== Fairfax Group ===
He founded Fairfax Group, a private investigation and corporate compliance firm, in 1983. Fairfax merged with Decision Strategies International in 1997, becoming Decision Strategies/Fairfax International L.L.C. (DSFX), headquartered in New York. In February 2001, DSFX was acquired by its client, SPX Corporation, headquartered in Charlotte, North Carolina, with Hershman remaining as chairman of the new SPX subsidiary. In late 2006, he left SPX then re-established the Fairfax Group where it had originally been founded, in Fairfax County, Virginia. Fairfax clients have included domestic and international governments, law firms, and corporate clients such as General Electric, NBC, Pfister, and Soloviev. Noted investigations include the Bofors scandal, following Hershman's revelation that the company Bofors had bribed Indian politicians, and also had attempted to bribe him, both in order to halt investigation, and again to undermine key figure Vishwanath Pratap Singh.

=== Soloviev Group ===
He became the chief executive officer of long-term client Soloviev Group in 2021. Hershman had had a long-term relationship with the firm's late founder, Sheldon Solow, whose son Stefan Soloviev appointed Hershman CEO of the rebranded Soloviev Group in 2021, after assuming leadership. He spearheaded the developer's bid to erect a casino on the former site of the Waterside Generating Station in Manhattan, among other projects, and serves on the advisory board of the Soloviev Foundation.

== Affiliations ==
Hershman joined Peter Eiger, formerly of World Bank, in co-founding Transparency International (TI), in 1993, as a director of its board. The watchdog group is based in Germany and cited as the foremost NGO battling corruption globally, with a mission to "stop corruption and promote transparency, accountability and integrity at all levels" growing internationally to, in 2015, about 90 national chapters.

He was named independent compliance advisor to the board of directors of Siemens in 2006, to structure its governance and transparency, helping mitigate pending fines through compliance, to be levied following its worldwide bribery scandal. He received commendation for business ethics from The General Assembly of the Virginia House of Delegates in its House Joint Resolution 1002 in February 2009. In 2010, he was a founder of the International Anti-Corruption Academy in Vienna, Austria.

In 2012, Hershman served on the independent governance committee for FIFA, soccer's global governing body, following an array of scandals, appearing on 60 Minutes. After two years of investigation, he surmised that a "complete reorganization of FIFA, with a change in leadership and in the top staff" was necessary. In 2015, he chaired the Fairfax County, Virginia Ad Hoc Police Practices Review Commission.

He became Group CEO of the International Centre for Sport Security (ICSS) in June 2016. Hershman has been a corruption advisor to Interpol, and a member of the United States Chamber of Commerce Economic and Security Working Group. He is also a board member the Center for Internet and Private Enterprise (CIPE), Coalition for Integrity and on the board of trustees for Marymount University.
