= Ibrahim Chaibou =

Nigerien football referee (born 1966)

- Born: 1966 (age 59–60); Niamey, Niger
- Other occupation: Military officer

Domestic
Years	League	Role
1996–2011	Super Ligue	Referee

International
Years	League	Role
1996–2011	FIFA listed	Referee

Ibrahim Chaibou (born 1966) is a Nigerien former football referee and convicted match-fixer who was listed on the FIFA International Referees List between 1996 and 2011. (Note: Convicted by the FIFA Ethics Committee.) He was banned for life by FIFA in January 2019.

== Career as a CAF referee ==
Chaibou became involved in tournaments of the Confederation of African Football (CAF) in the 1990s, attaining the FIFA international badge in 1996 and continuing in this role until his retirement in 2011, when he left the sport after reaching the then-mandatory age of retirement of 45 years old. He took charge of matches in the CAF first qualifying round for the 2006 FIFA World Cup and in the CAF qualifying rounds for the 2010 FIFA World Cup in South Africa.

In February 2009, Chaibou was chosen for the inaugural edition of the African Nations Championship (CHAN), which was played in the Ivory Coast. He served as the main referee in two games: the 1–1 draw between Zimbabwe and DR Congo in Stade Bouaké and the match between Zambia and Tanzania, which ended in another 1–1 draw, also in Stade Bouaké. Chaibou awarded a penalty kick to the Tanzanian side in the 88th minute, with player Shadrack Nsajigwa scoring the equalising goal.

Chaibou retired from professional football in December 2011 but continued to be active in the field by conceding interviews about refereeing and the performances of other CAF officials. He defended Algerian referee Mohamed Benouza in June 2012 after Senegalese players heavily criticised him following a heated match against Uganda in Kampala. During the match, Benouza awarded a penalty kick to the Ugandans, and the game ended in a draw. Chaibou defended Benouza's decision, stating in a phone interview with the L'Observateur that Benouza would have "awarded the penalty without hesitation" if it had been played in Senegal, dismissing allegations that the Algerian referee had had a poor performance. Chaibou added that CAF trusted Benouza and chose him for several important continental games, saying that it was proof that Benouza was a good referee.

== Controversies ==
Chaibou came under the scrutiny of FIFA authorities following a friendly match between South Africa and Guatemala in Peter Mokaba Stadium in the lead-up to the 2010 FIFA World Cup. He sanctioned three penalties against Guatemala, and the score ended in a crushing 5–0 win for the locals. In September 2010, Chaibou drew again the attention of FIFA and the FIFA Ethics Committee after he was assigned to an exhibition game in Bahrain between the Bahraini national team and a fake team representing Togo. According to the investigation that concluded years later, Chaibou had been told to keep the score low by calling offsides and invalidating legitimate goals.

In October and November 2010, Chaibou was selected by the Singaporean-based company Football 4 U International to officiate in two friendly matches in South America: Bolivia and Venezuela and Ecuador v. Venezuela. The game in Santa Cruz de la Sierra ended in a 3–1 victory for the Venezuelans, while Ecuador won its match against the Vinotinto by a 4–1 score in Quito. Both games raised flags among betting monitors, with a confidential report by one of those monitors highlighting the "similarly questionable" penalty kicks which Chaibou awarded to both teams during the match in Ecuador.

On 1 June 2011, controversy surrounding Chaibou's performances intensified after he oversaw a high-stakes friendly match between Argentina and Nigeria in Moshood Abiola National Stadium in Abuja. Chaibou awarded two penalties, one for each side, and extended the match for twelve additional minutes as extra time to the full time of ninety minutes. In the 98th minute of the game, Chaibou sanctioned a penalty kick against Nigeria after the ball hit the groin of a Nigerian defender following a strong hit by Argentine player Mauro Boselli. Argentine media reacted to Chaibou's performance, with Infobae writing that there was no explanation for Chaibou's extension of the match for five more minutes when there was no sense in doing so as the score was a defining 4–1 for the locals. A reporter for La Voz del Interior wrote that Chaibou had a background in controversial decisions, sarcastically stating that Chaibou worked extra hours.

== Investigation ==
After the match between Nigeria and Argentina, FIFA security chief Chris Eaton told the media that they were "trying hard to track down" Chaibou and said that they were confident in succeeding. FIFA additionally opened an investigation into other Chaibou's performances, including the match between South Africa and Guatemala. On 28 June 2011, the South African Football Association (SAFA) stated that they hoped that match fixing had not affected the game and assured it would help FIFA investigate the issue if asked. The FIFA Ethics Committee sanctioned SAFA president Kirsten Nematandani over "compelling evidence" that international friendlies had been rigged.

In January 2019, FIFA concluded its investigation into Chaibou and other football officials, finding that referees and associations' representatives had been involved in match-fixing. FIFA authorities stated that the Singapore-based Football 4 U International, led by Singaporean businessmen Dan Tan and Wilson Raj Perumal, had funded FIFA-authorised international exhibition games with the request that the company selected the matches' referees. Perumal, who had been arrested in Finland in 2011 over ties to corruption in Finnish football and the Asiagate, later told the media that he had appointed Chaibou to several games because he considered Chaibou "very bold". Chaibou had also been selected to officiate in small tournaments in Egypt.

Perumal wrote a memoir about his life within the football world and gave different interviews to international outlets, including one to CNN sports journalist Don Riddell. He admitted to Riddell that he had been involved in bribing referees to manipulate matches' results, describing Chaibou as his favourite official and saying that "(Chaibou) was the best, he was the best, but not from FIFA’s point of view."

As a consequence of the Ethics Committee's investigation, FIFA banned Chaibou for life in January 2019 from any football-linked activities and imposed a fine of 200,000 Swiss francs (154,104 British pounds) for match fixing. The committee found Chaibou guilty of receiving bribes, adding that he had manipulated the course of matches to influence the final results. FIFA's security chief Eaton issued a statement saying that Chaibou "was probably the most corrupt referee the game of football has seen."

Chaibou repeatedly denied fixing games, stating in a phone interview with the Associated Press (AP) that he had not been involved in corrupting results and that he went back home "peacefully" after officiating. He also denied knowing Perumal and showed frustration when the AP reporter asked him about his ties to Perumal. Chaibou told the AP in a phone interview from his home in Niamey that FIFA authorities had contacted him and that he had already talked to them. When the interviewer asked Chaibou whether Perumal had dictated the outcome of the matches he oversaw, Chaibou hung up and never responded again to AP requests for a statement.

Although FIFA tried on numerous occasions to interrogate Chaibou, he has never left his native Niger and later became a member of his country's military. FIFA officials later said that given that they only pursue investigations on active referees, they were not going to continue their attempts in extracting Chaibou's testimony.

== Selected record ==
Friendlies
Date	Match	Result	Stadium	FIFA verdict	Notes
31 May 2010	South Africa – Guatemala	5–0	Peter Mokaba Stadium, Polokwane	Fixed	(Note: Chaibou was fined $60,000 for corrupting this match.)
7 September 2010	Bahrain – Togo	3–0	Riffa, Bahrain	Invalid	(Note: The team saying to represent Togo was made of impostors.)
17 October 2010	Bolivia – Venezuela	1–3	Estadio Ramón Tahuichi Aguilera, Santa Cruz de la Sierra	Suspected match-fixing	(Note: Perumal wrote in a letter from prison that the match had been sold to "an investor in China.")
17 November 2010	Ecuador – Venezuela	4–1	Quito	Suspected match-fixing	
1 June 2011	Nigeria – Argentina	4–1	Moshood Abiola National Stadium, Abuja	Fixed	(Note: Chaibou whistled inexistent penalties and was confronted by Argentine players like Ezequiel Garay. Then AFA President Julio Grondona filed a report against Chaibou.)
