= Siham Mousa Hamoud Jabr Al Moussawi =

Iraqi politician

Siham Mousa Hamoud Jabr Al Moussawi (Arabic: سهام موسى حمود جبرl; born 1983), is an Iraqi politician. She has a bachelor's degree and served as a member of the Council of Representatives for the governorate of Qadisiyah in its third session (2014-2018) for State of Law Coalition inside Badr Organization. She wom the Iraqi legislative elections for 2018 with a total of 6,885 votes.
