= Mohammed Hanzab =

Qatari military officer (born 1965)

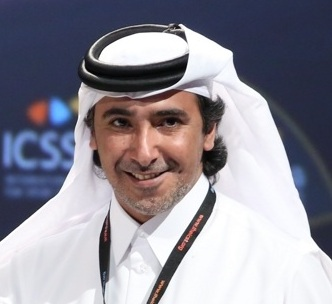
- Mohammed Hanzab

President, International Centre for Sport Security
- Incumbent
- Assumed office 2011

Personal details
- Born: 1965 (age 60–61) Doha, Qatar
- Education: Royal Air Force College Cranwell

Mohammed Hanzab is the President of the International Centre for Sport Security (ICSS) in Doha, Qatar. He is the former President of the Qatar International Academy for Security Studies and has an extensive background in defence.

== Early life and education ==
Born in Doha, Qatar (1965), Hanzab graduated from the British Royal Air Force College Cranwell.

== Career ==
Hanzab is a former lieutenant colonel in the Qatar Armed Forces and has served as a commander of the Qatar Air Defence School and worked at the Qatar Air Defence Project, focusing on the advancement of secure communication, radar and C4i capabilities. Hanzab also undertook various senior roles for the Qatar Information Agency, including director of publications. He serves as president of the ICSS and is a former president of the Qatar International Academy for Security Studies (QIASS).

In 2016, Hanzab launched the Sports Integrity Global Alliance.

=== The International Centre for Sport Security ===
Mohammed Hanzab became President of The International Centre for Sport Security (ICSS) in March 2011. The International Centre for Sport Security (ICSS) is an international, not-for-profit organisation based in Doha, Qatar. It was established in 2010 to act as a global hub of expertise in the field of safety, security and integrity for major sporting events. The ICSS's key activities include advisory, training and research. It works primarily with organising committees, governments, bidding nations, infrastructure owners, sport associations, leagues and clubs. Hanzab was proud to launch the first international sport security journal in December 2012. The ICSS also organises the annual conference, "Securing Sport", first held in Doha in 2011, Qatar as well as the ICSS Expert Summit most recently held in Austria. The Vice President of the ICSS is Qatari, Mohammed Hajaj Al Shahwani, the Director General is German-born, Helmut Spahn formerly of FIFA and now a UEFA Security Officer. Hanzab's advisory board members include: Lord John Stevens, Eric Drossart, Khoo Boon Hui, Rick Parry, Dr Peter Ryan, Horst R. Schmidt and tennis star, Monica Seles.

=== Qatar International Academy for Security Studies ===
In 2008 Mohammed Hanzab was appointed President of the Qatar International Academy for Security Studies (QIASS), a professional institute that aims to raise security standards, knowledge, and cooperation within the Gulf region and across the world. QIASS serves multiple market sectors including governmental, commercial, and non-profit, across national, multinational, and international levels. Partners include global education and strategic policy organisations.

=== Memorandums of Agreement at ICSS ===
Hanzab has been called on by a multitude of international media on a variety of sport security, safety and integrity issues. He has signed memorandums of understanding on the ICSS’ behalf with a number of organisations including: UNICEF, UNESCO, European Professional Football Leagues, the Qatar Football Association, the Organization of American States, the European Lotteries and Germany's Institute for Fan Culture, ESSMA, the World Bank, and a partnership agreement with Pantheon-Sorbonne University to combat breaches of sporting integrity including match-fixing, with the duo most recently awarding an integrity award to the Badminton World Federation for their swift and resolute action in banning four Badminton doubles teams from the London 2012 Olympic and Paralympic Games for match fixing. Hanzab also launched the Save the Dream programme with football star Alessandro Del Piero, awarding the first 'save the dream' award to Ivan Fernandez Anaya. The first international 'save the dream' office was opened at Allesandro Del Piero's new Academy in Turin, Italy in May 2013. Hanzab also headed a high-level meeting in collaboration with UNICRI on sport protection in the Middle East.
