= Noel White =

English businessman and football executive (1929–2019)

Noel White BEM
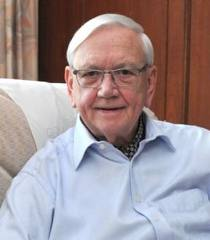
- Noel White in 2012
- Born: 16 December 1929; Altrincham, Cheshire, England
- Died: 30 June 2019 (aged 89)
- Years active: 1955–2019

Noel White BEM (16 December 1929 – 30 June 2019) was a businessman, football club chairman, director and administrator from the North West of England. He was one of the founding architects of the Premier League and Life Vice President of The Football Association.

== Business ==
=== White and Swales ===
White and Swales Ltd was founded in Altrincham by Noel White and Peter Swales in 1955. They initially sold Sheet Music, Records, Musical Instruments and Accessories before moving into the flourishing market of television rentals. They had by this time opened a total 15 branches in Cheshire and South Manchester.

=== Bowdon Hotel ===
Following the sale of White and Swales, Noel moved on to run and own the Bowdon Hotel in Altrincham. Following major extensions and improvements, this gave the hotel a 3-star rating, which it still has. White went on to sell the Bowdon Hotel in 1986. It is currently operated under the Mercure Hotels banner.

== Football ==
=== Altrincham F.C. ===
Noel White first came to football prominence, when he and fellow businessman, Peter Swales took over Altrincham Football Club in February 1961. At the time Altrincham F.C. were struggling at the foot of The Cheshire County Football League and on the verge of bankruptcy. White and Swales had read a passionate letter in the local newspaper from 11-year-old Brian Lomax. White was vice-chairman of Altrincham F.C until 1967, when Peter Swales moved on to become a director at Manchester City F.C. White then became Chairman of Altrincham F.C. for 19 years before becoming a director of Liverpool Football Club in 1986. During his tenure as chairman, he and his board turned Altrincham from nobodies into one of the leading clubs outside The Football League. Upon leaving Altrincham F.C. in 1986 White was appointed club president, a position he still holds. He is also president of the Evo Stik Northern Premier League and a life member of The Football Conference.

=== Liverpool F.C. ===
White joined Liverpool F.C. in March 1986 and was a director for over 20 years, including a spell as chairman from 1990 until 1991. In October 2006, White gave an anonymous interview to the Daily Mirror in which he accused manager Rafael Benítez of spending money the club could not afford, and said that it was time for the board to review taking control. This ended a long association with the club of which he was briefly the chairman.

=== The F.A Premier League ===
During his chairmanship of Liverpool F.C, Noel White, along with Martin Edwards, David Dein, Irving Scholar and Philip Carter became one of the five founding architects of the F.A. Premier League. In June 2011, on the twentieth anniversary of the "Founder Members Agreement" of the F.A. Premier League, the architects were presented with a framed testimonial containing the crests of the forty-five clubs that have played in the competition since its inception in 1992.

=== The Football Association ===
White's initial involvement with The Football Association began in 1976 when he was elected as a council member representing full member clubs in Cheshire and Merseyside. White was instrumental in helping introduce automatic promotion and relegation with the Football League a decade later. White was elected to the F.A. International Committee in 1982 and was appointed chairman in 1994. White was chairman of The Football Association's International Committee for 14 years until 2008. He was succeeded as chairman by Sir Dave Richards. White was elected as Life Vice President of The Football Association in 2002.

=== UEFA ===
White was appointed vice-chairman of the UEFA National Team Committee in 2002 and served for 4 years in that position. The UEFA National Team Committee represents European Nations which play in European competitions at Senior and Under-21 level.

== Awards ==
In June 2013, Noel White was awarded a British Empire Medal for services to football as part of the Queen's birthday honours list.

== Death ==
On 30 June 2019, White died, following a long illness.
