= Helen May Butler =

American bandleader and composer (1867–1957)

- Born: May 17, 1867; Keene, New Hampshire
- Died: June 6, 1957 (aged 90); Covington, Kentucky
- Other names: Helen May Spahn, Helen May Young
- Occupations: composer, bandleader
- Years active: 1898–1911
- Known for: leading early professional all-women's band
- Notable work: "Cosmopolitan American March"

Helen May Butler (1867–1957) was an American bandleader and composer who has been called "The female Sousa". Leading an all-women's band from 1898 to 1912, she had an extremely successful career at a time when women were discouraged from such public activities. Her best-known group, Helen May Butler and Her Ladies' Military Band, was a favorite of President Theodore Roosevelt, and one of her compositions, "Cosmopolitan American March", was selected as the official march of the Republican Party during Roosevelt's 1904 election campaign.

== Early life and education ==
Helen May Butler was born on a farm in Keene, New Hampshire, on May 17, 1867. Her parents were Lucius Marshall Butler and Esther L. (Abbott) Butler. Her father was a former railroad engineer who designed some of the early Pullman cars. The family moved to Providence, Rhode Island, when she was still a child.

As a girl, Butler studied violin with the Boston Symphony Orchestra's concertmaster, Bernard Listerman and with Abbie Shepardson-Mauck. From Listerman she obtained her first good violin, an instrument of the same era as Stradivarius violins. She also became an accomplished cornet player.

== Career ==
In 1891, Butler formed her own orchestra, the Talma Ladies Orchestra, performing privately at the houses of the well-to-do. Butler wanted to lead a band that could perform in public venues, but at the time such activities were not considered appropriate for young women. The popular military bands of the time, in particular, developed from a strongly male tradition and generally excluded women well into the 20th century. So in 1898, Butler went ahead and formed a new group with different instrumentation, the U.S. Talma Ladies Military Band. It initially numbered less than two dozen members but later grew to a core of 25–35 women, occasionally swelling to as many as 60 for special occasions. The women dressed in elegant military-styled uniforms with ostrich-plumed tricorne hats. In addition to the traditional brass instruments, the band included a woodwind section.

Around 1901, businessman John Leslie Spahn heard Butler's band and decided to sponsor them. He became the band's business manager and renamed the band to Helen May Butler and Her Ladies' Military Band (alternatively: the Helen May Butler Ladies Brass Band), promoting them as an "Adam-less Garden of Musical Eves". To further the all-women illusion, he lightly disguised his own gender by styling himself as J. Leslie Spahn. In 1901, Butler's band played its first concert under its new name at the Pan-American Exposition in Buffalo, New York, the only women's band to appear at the Exposition.

During its heyday, the band toured America from coast to coast—including the Chatauqua circuit—becoming not only the best-known group of women musicians but critically acclaimed as one of the top bands in the country. The billed themselves as performing music "by American composers, played by American girls". Their popularity is evidenced by the fact that they performed over 100 times in St. Louis, Missouri, Charleston, South Carolina, and Buffalo, New York, and over 200 times in Boston, in addition to all the other cities they toured. In one stretch in 1903-04, they played a concert a day for thirteen months. In the winters—which were off-season for traveling bands like Butler's—Butler would teach music and conduct local orchestras in her winter base of Beatrice, Nebraska.

In 1902, Spahn organized contracts for a tour throughout Texas. That year the band played at the White House for Theodore Roosevelt, becoming a favorite with the president.

In 1903, Butler and her band won first prize at the Women's Exposition in New York City. Throughout that year, they toured the eastern and southern states.

In 1904, Butler's band played at the St. Louis World's Fair alongside many other bands, including that of John Philip Sousa. It was because of her similarly forceful personality that she was given the moniker "The female Sousa". In St. Louis, C.G. Conn—whose instruments Butler had previously endorsed—gave the entire band silver Conn instruments.

One of her own compositions, "Cosmopolitan American March", was published in 1904 and became the official march of the Republican Party during Roosevelt's election campaign that year. Butler's band played at the Republican National Convention.

== Personal life and later years ==
Butler married Spahn, her business manager, in 1902. They had a daughter, also named Helen May, and a son, Leslie. She divorced Spahn after a few years of marriage. She married her second husband, a Scotsman named James Herbert Young, in 1911. The following year, she broke up her band and retired to raise her family in Cincinnati, Ohio. There the couple ran the Burlington Hotel.

In later years, Butler ran a boarding house near Covington, Kentucky, from the 1920s to around 1950. In 1936, Butler ran for a U.S. Senate seat in Kentucky. She died on June 16, 1957, in Covington.

== Honors and legacy ==
The composer J.A. Barlett wrote a march dedicated to Butler, "Miss Sousa Jr."

In 1995, she was inducted into the Women Band Directors International Hall of Fame for Distinguished Women Band Conductors.

Butler's band uniforms, photographs, programs, sheet music, and other memorabilia are in the collection of the Smithsonian Institution in Washington, D.C.
