= Helmut Spahn =

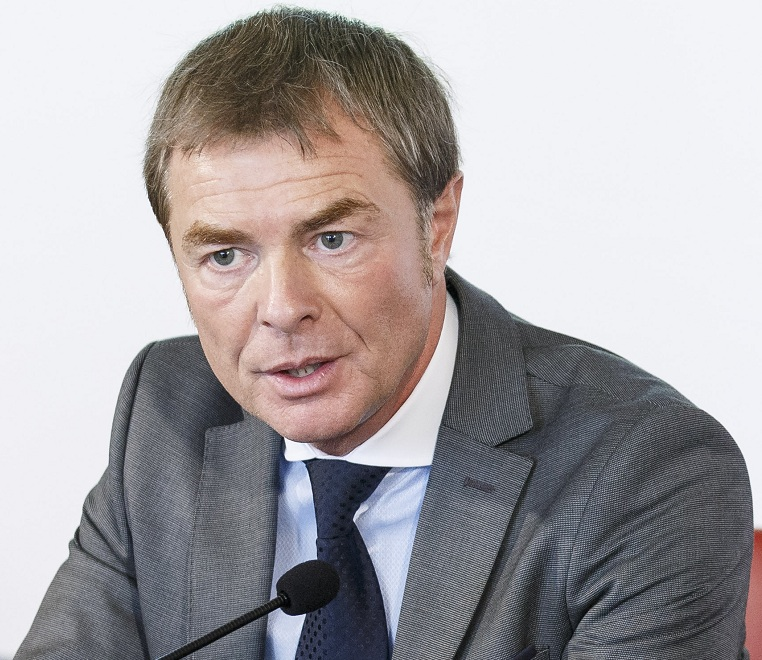
- Helmut Spahn

Director Security of Fédération Internationale de Football Association (FIFA)
- Incumbent
- Assumed office May 2017
- President: Kickers Offenbach

Personal details
- Born: 19 March 1961 (age 65) Seligenstadt, Germany
- Education: University of Applied Science Wiesbaden

Helmut Spahn (born 1961) is Director Security of Fédération Internationale de Football Association (FIFA), former Director General of the International Centre for Sport Security (ICSS), and former president of the football club Kickers Offenbach. He spent over 20 years as a high-ranking officer in the German police force. Spahn was formerly Head of Security for the 2006 FIFA World Cup in Germany and Chief Security Officer for the German Football Association (Deutscher Fussball-Bund, DFB). He has been a UEFA Security Officer for the Champions League and Europa League since 2007 as well as UEFA Euro 2012.

== Early life, training and education ==
Born 19 March 1961 in Seligenstadt, Germany, Spahn received his training at the Senior Police Service in Wiesbaden and the Police Academy in Munster. He graduated with a degree in Management from the University of Applied Science Wiesbaden, where he also lectured Management Studies.

== Career ==
=== Law enforcement ===
Spahn began his career in law enforcement in 1984 in Hessen, Germany, where he served on the local police force and did service in the riot police unit. He went on to hold several key positions, including becoming the platoon leader and lead training officer for the riot police unit. Spahn was appointed the Head of Security and Public Order of the Frankfurt Police Directorate in 2000, before becoming Head of the Frankfurt Police SEK police tactical unit.

=== Security for major sports events ===
From 2006 to 2011 Spahn was Chief Security Officer for the German Football Association Spahn served as the Head of Security for the 2006 FIFA World Cup Germany, the Head of Security for the 2011 FIFA Women's World Cup Germany and has been a UEFA security officer for the Champions League and Europa League since 2007 as well as UEFA Euro 2012. As the executive director for the ICSS, Spahn is often called on for expert security advice and opinion, most recently on the Boston Marathon bombing.

=== The International Centre for Sport Security ===
Spahn joined the ICSS in 2011 as executive director and served as director general until 2016. The ICSS is an international, not-for-profit organisation based in Doha, Qatar. It was established in 2010 and formally launched in March 2011 by its president, Mohammed Hanzab, to act as a global hub of expertise in the field of safety, security and integrity for major sporting events.

The ICSS’s key activities include advisory, training and research. It works primarily with organising committees, governments, bidding nations, infrastructure owners, sport associations, leagues and clubs. The ICSS also organises the annual conference, "Securing Sport", held in Doha, Qatar.
