= David Dein =

British football administrator and executive

David Dein OBE
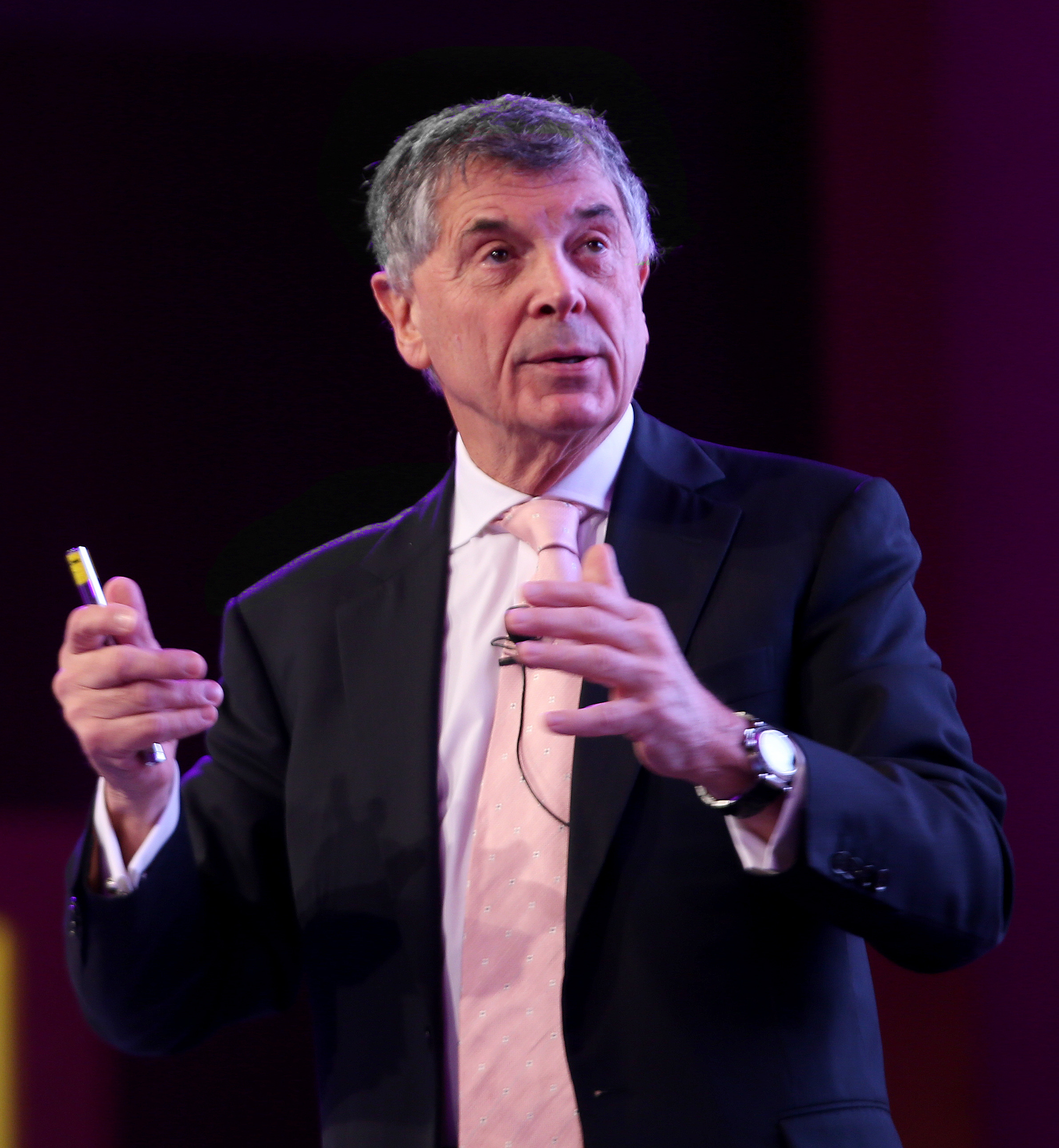
- Dein in 2016
- Born: 7 September 1943 (age 83); London, England
- Occupation: Former vice-chairman of Arsenal
- Spouse: Barbara Dein
- Children: 3, including Gavin Dein

David Barry Dein OBE (born 7 September 1943) is a British businessman, known for being a former co-owner and vice-chairman of Arsenal, as well as founding the Premier League.

Dein was vice-chairman of Arsenal between 1983 and 2007, and was instrumental in the formation of the Premier League in 1992. In August 2007, he sold his shares in Arsenal to London-based, Russian-owned business company Red and White Holdings.

He was the President of the G-14 group of European football clubs between October 2006 and May 2007, and has sat on various committees within FIFA and UEFA including UEFA's Club Competition Committee and Executive Committee. He was also the International President of England's unsuccessful 2018 World Cup bid.

Dein is also the founder of The Twinning Project, a charity which connects prisons and football clubs to help the rehabilitation of prisoners. He spends much of his time giving motivational speeches to schools and prisons in the UK and at football conferences.

== Arsenal ==
Dein began in business as a sugar trader. He was vice-chairman of Arsenal between 1983 and 2007. He was appointed when he bought a 16.6% share of the club for £292,000 from Peter Hill-Wood, Arsenal's chairman in September 1983. At the time of Dein's purchase in 1983, Hill-Wood described Dein as "crazy" to invest his money in the club, stating that "to all intents and purposes, it's dead money". Dein built up his shares until he owned 42% of the club in 1991. Over the next decade, debts incurred forced him to sell just short of a 30% stake to co-director Danny Fiszman for approximately £11m. By 2007, his remaining shares were believed to be worth in the region of £57 million to £65 million.

=== Formation of the Premier League ===
Dein was one of the architects of the Premier League in 1992, which re-shaped the structure and finances of English football. "I felt football was really a sleeping giant and had a long way to go," Dein said. "After seeing how the Americans operated their sport, particularly American football and baseball and basketball, I felt we were light years behind. We had so much more to give as an attraction." Greg Dyke, later the chairman of the FA, stressed the central role of Dein in the creation of the Premier League, saying: "David Dein was the most revolutionary bloke I've met in football. David Dein created the Premier League, it was his idea."

=== Success with Arsène Wenger ===
During his time at the club, he had an active role in the transfer of players and contract negotiations. Dein was behind the appointment of the little-known Arsène Wenger to the manager's job in 1996. Under Wenger, Arsenal won the Premier League three times and the FA Cup seven times, and Dein strongly backed him and his transfer plans.

Following the dismissal of George Graham in February 1995, he tried to convince his fellow board members to appoint Wenger as manager. They seemed reluctant to bring on board an unknown Frenchman managing in Japan and opted instead for Bruce Rioch. Following the dismissal of Rioch a year later, Dein again suggested that Wenger should be hired. His efforts proved successful and Wenger was appointed manager of Arsenal in October 1996. It is generally agreed that, without Dein, Wenger would never have been appointed manager.

Dein believed that Wenger would change Arsenal's style of play, which was seen as dogmatic and one-dimensional, to one based on technique and speed more attuned with the approach adopted by teams from the continent.

Dein was instrumental in the club's recruitment of players. In September 1991, he helped Arsenal sign Ian Wright from Crystal Palace for £2.5 million. Wright later stated that Dein "was always very close to the players... He was like a father figure to us, and everybody loved him." In June 1995, Dein signed Dutch international Dennis Bergkamp for £7.5 million from Internazionale.

=== Redevelopment of Highbury ===
Dein was influential in the transformation of Highbury into an all-seater stadium. Following the Hillsborough disaster, the Taylor Report required Premier League clubs to introduce all-seater stadiums. Dein was behind the introduction of a bond scheme, unpopular with fans, to finance the redevelopment of Highbury's North Bank and Clock End terraces into all-seater stands.

Dein also helped obtain Arsenal's entry into the G-14 group of major European football clubs in 2002, and became President of the G-14 in October 2006. He was also President of Arsenal Ladies Football Club while Arsenal vice-chairman.

=== Departure ===
On 18 April 2007, Dein left the club due to "irreconcilable differences" between him and the rest of the board. It is thought that he was in favour of a possible takeover of Arsenal by an external investor. Arsenal had invested heavily in the development of their new stadium, which had forced the club to take on heavy debts, and as such meant that the club was in need of new revenue. The other members of the board were said to have signed a contractual agreement that they would not sell their shares for a year, and they jointly expressed their intention to retain their shares in the long term. Dein was replaced as G-14 chairman by Lyon chairman Jean-Michel Aulas the following month.

Arsène Wenger stated: "It is a huge disappointment because we worked very closely together, David has contributed highly to the success of the club in the last 10 years and even before that as well. Red and white are the colours of his heart." Former player Ian Wright also expressed his unhappiness at Dein's departure, and said the players were upset.

=== Sale of Arsenal shareholding ===
In August 2007, David Dein sold his 9,072 shares (14.58%) in the club for £75 million to Red & White Holdings, an investment vehicle of Russian metal billionaire Alisher Usmanov and his business partner Farhad Moshiri. Dein was appointed as chairman of Red & White, which was at the time the largest shareholder in the club outside of members of the board of directors. In September 2008, he resigned as chairman of Red & White, with The Times suggesting it was to improve relations between Arsenal and Red & White.

== The Football Association ==
In 1986, Dein was voted onto the board of the Football League Management Committee, and subsequently achieved a place on the FA Council. He was also one of the major architects of the Premier League in 1992. He eventually rose to the position of vice-chairman of the FA in 2000, a post he held until 2004, when it was scrapped after a restructuring. He was subsequently re-elected to the FA Board as a Premier League representative.

Dein was a key mover in the FA's manoeuvering to hire Sven-Göran Eriksson as England manager in 2001. Five years later, in 2006, he was one of four members of an FA panel (the others being Brian Barwick, Noel White and Dave Richards) tasked with identifying Eriksson's replacement. Dein's preferred choice, Luiz Felipe Scolari, was offered the job and looked set to take it, but later changed his mind; the FA eventually chose Middlesbrough manager Steve McClaren.

Dein sat on the FA Board until 2 June 2006 as one of four representatives of the Premier League clubs. He was replaced by David Gill, chief executive of Manchester United. This removal came one day after a news story broke on the BBC's Newsnight programme regarding possible infringements of FIFA rules regarding player transfers with, and loans to, Belgian club Beveren.

The FA compliance committee investigated the BBC's allegations but did not find any breach of FA or Premier League rules by Arsenal. On 30 June 2006, FIFA released a statement stating there was no evidence of any wrongdoing by Arsenal in relation to its ties with Beveren.

Dein was the representative of the Premier League on UEFA's committee for club competitions, and a former member of the FA Council, having to step down from his position when he left Arsenal.

Dein was part of the founding committee, alongside Lord Ouseley, which established the 'Let's Kick Racism Out of Football' campaign in 1993 (later Kick It Out).

=== Alleged conflicts of interest ===
Dein's dual roles as director of Arsenal and a senior member of the Football Association's executive led to accusations of conflicts of interest.

In 2005, Chelsea manager José Mourinho said: "A person who works in the club should not work in the FA. The FA is the FA and the club is the club"; he called on David Dein to resign. Mourinho's complaint related to the league programme apparently favouring Arsenal. In 2004–05, Arsenal played five of their six league games immediately following Champions League group matches at home, while Chelsea had to play five away. This was not the only row Dein has had with Chelsea: Dein complained about Chelsea "tapping up" Ashley Cole, which resulted in Cole, Chelsea and José Mourinho all being fined by the FA. He was later accused of making a "covert" approach for Gilberto Silva that was similar to Chelsea's approach for Cole, while Gilberto was at Atlético Mineiro. Dein denied this, saying that he had made his approach known to Atlético; the president of Mineiro, Alexandre Kall, confirmed Dein's account and said that Arsenal had complied with all the rules. Kall stated: "I am shocked to hear about the press reports concerning the sale of Gilberto Silva. I can confirm that Arsenal complied with all the rules and all the negotiations with the player were held exclusively between the two clubs."

In 2006, during the search for a new England manager to replace Eriksson, Bolton Wanderers manager Sam Allardyce questioned Dein's role in the FA, saying: "I don't know how much power David Dein has but he obviously has a great influence at the FA", and alleged that Dein had shielded Arsenal manager Arsène Wenger from the selection process. Middlesbrough chairman Steve Gibson made similar allegations, but Wenger denied this, saying he had been on FA chief executive Brian Barwick's original longlist, but told him from the outset that he did not want the job, a story later confirmed by the FA.

== G-14 ==
Dein was appointed President of the G-14 in October 2006. At the time, several legal disputes between clubs and FIFA and national associations relating to the release of players for international matches were on-going. It led to an agreement on compensation for the release of players for international tournaments.

== England 2018 World Cup bid ==
In February 2010, Dein was appointed International President of England's unsuccessful 2018 World Cup bid, responsible for lobbying members of FIFA's Executive Committee who picked the country which would stage the tournament. His experience in the game and his contacts at the highest levels of global football were seen as vital in England's chances of winning the bid.

== Twinning Project ==
In October 2018, Dein launched the Twinning Project at Wembley. The Project, a partnership between football clubs and prisons, is backed by the UK Government and football bodies. The scheme will help clubs deliver coaching, refereeing courses and other sporting qualifications to provide routes to paid employment for prisoners.

Dein, who has given talks in over 100 prisons across the UK, said at the project's launch: "Football can be a powerful force for good, and the Twinning Project will use this to help people change their lives when they are released from prison".

In November 2021, Dein and Arsene Wenger raised £150,000 for the Twinning Project at a sell-out event at the London Palladium, hosted by footballers Ian Wright and Alex Scott.

== Personal life ==
Dein lives in Totteridge, north London, and has a large house in Mayfair. He has been married to his wife Barbara since 1972, and is the father to a daughter, Sasha Dein Fugazzola, and two sons Darren and Gavin Dein, and the grandfather to eight grandchildren. His first cousin is lawyer Jeremy Dein.

Dein's son, Darren, is a solicitor, and was Thierry Henry's best man. and his second son Gavin Dein, is the founder and CEO of Reward Insight who, in November 2020, sold a minority stake in his business in a deal worth over £100m.

Dein was chairman of the Theatre Investment Fund in England.

On 29 December 2018, Dein was awarded an MBE in the 2019 Queen's New Year honours list for his services to football and for voluntary work in school and prisons.
