= Rick Parry =

British football executive (born 1955)

- Born: Richard Nicholas Parry; 23 February 1955 (age 71)
- Occupation: Chairman of the English Football League

Richard Nicholas Parry (born 23 February 1955) is the current chairman of the English Football League (EFL), the former chief executive of Liverpool, the original CEO of the Premier League and a board member at New York Cosmos.

== Career ==
Parry was educated at the Kings School Chester and the University of Liverpool. Upon obtaining his degree, in Maths as a trainee Chartered Accountant in 1976, qualifying three years later. Having spent a number of years in the leisure industry in financial controller positions, he rejoined his former firm (by then known as Arthur Young) in 1983 as a management consultant.

A Liverpool fan, Parry was recruited from his position as a senior management consultant with leading UK firm Ernst & Young in 1991 to assist in planning the new Premier League. Appointed Chief Executive in February 1992, the competition was officially ratified just seven days later by The Football Association, allowing Parry to proceed with negotiations for a television deal which was eventually awarded to BSkyB and the BBC for a then record bid of £304 million over five years.

As Chief Executive, Parry oversaw the development of The Premier League into one of the top professional football competitions in the world, with major investment in new stadiums, increased attendances and an influx of major international stars. During his last twelve months at Lancaster Gate, he brokered the biggest ever television deal in the history of UK sport, with BSkyB and the BBC offering a package in excess of £700m for Premier League broadcasting rights.

Parry's experience is not confined solely to football, having prepared Manchester's bid for the 1992 Olympic Games in 1985 and later advised the Birmingham Olympic Games Council on financial matters. In the following year, he spent six months on a major assignment for The Football League before assuming the role of Chief Executive to the Manchester Phoenix Initiative, a major urban regeneration project which culminated in the establishment of the Central Manchester Development Corporation.

When Manchester secured the British nomination to bid for the 1996 Olympic Games, Parry was seconded to the bid committee for two and a half years as full-time Director supervising, amongst other responsibilities, the planning of a £750 million Olympic Centre.

Parry was appointed as chief executive at Liverpool in July 1998 by then chairman David Moores.

On 18 June 2007, Parry was called to give evidence to the arbitration panel investigating the validity of an earlier tribunal decision regarding West Ham United's signing of Argentinian Internationals Carlos Tevez and Javier Mascherano. As Chief Executive of the Premier League, he was involved in the establishment of the Premier League rules and as Chief Executive of Liverpool, is believed to have voiced concerns over the registration in January when attempting to sign Mascherano on a loan deal.

In the fallout of the Liverpool FC takeover by the American consortium run by Hicks and Gillett, Parry's role as CEO was questioned by some sections of Liverpool support who considered that the club was not aggressive enough in the transfer market nor transparent enough in its support of the manager Rafa Benitez (even though Parry played a pivotal role employing Benitez as Liverpool manager). As fans' high expectations for success continued to fail to be realised, his role at the club came under close scrutiny.

On 25 February 2009 it was announced that he would be leaving Liverpool Football Club at the end of the 2008-09 season.

Since leaving Liverpool Football Club, Parry has taken on a number of roles as an independent consultant, most recently sitting on the UEFA investigatory panel of club financial fair play cases and as a member of the Board of the ICSS-Sorbonne sporting integrity program. Parry is also Chair of the Advisory Board of University of Liverpool Management School and contributes regularly to the University of Liverpool Management School's Football MBA programme. On 19 September 2019, it was announced that Parry would be taking over as Chair of the English Football League, subject to approval.
