= Wilson Raj Perumal =

Singaporean criminal

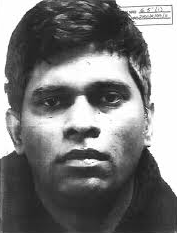
- Perumal in 2014
- Born: Wilson Raj Perumal; July 31, 1965 (age 61); Singapore
- Occupations: Author, match-fixer
- Status: Released from Finnish prison in February 2012, extradited to Hungary as a prosecution witness.
- Convictions: Match-fixing, assault
- Penalty: Four years in Singapore, two years in Finland, five years in Singapore. (The latter sentence was not served.)
- Website: kelongkings.com

Wilson Raj Perumal (born 31 July 1965) is a Singaporean convicted match-fixer.

== Early life and career ==
Perumal was accused of several match fixing scandals, including Asiagate in 2007–2009 and the 2008–2011 Finnish match-fixing scandal. He was first jailed for match-fixing in 1995 in Singapore. In the same year, Perumal traveled to England on behalf of a Singaporean match-fixing boss to fix two FA Cup matches. According to his autobiography, Perumal and an associate attempted to bribe Birmingham's goalkeeper Ian Bennett and Chelsea's goalkeeper Dmitri Kharine, failing both times.

In February 2011, Perumal was arrested in Finland and later sentenced to two years in prison. He served a year in Finnish prison and was then turned over to authorities in Hungary. Five years later Perumal was again in Finland and tried to buy Atlantis FC with a new name.

During his stay in Finnish prison, Perumal spoke to Finnish authorities and revealed a global network of match-fixers based in Singapore. Blaming other members of the network for his arrest, he confirmed Dan Tan as the boss of his operation.

Perumal may also have connections to the 2013 Europol match-fixing investigation.

He has published his match fixing memoirs in a book titled "Kelong Kings", written with investigative journalists Alessandro Righi and Emanuele Piano; the book was released on 28 April 2014. In the book, Perumal claims not only to have ferried Nigeria and Honduras to the final rounds of the 2010 South Africa FIFA World Cup by fixing their qualification matches, but also to have rigged competitions in the Atlanta 1996 and Beijing 2008 Olympic games also in 2019.

His memoir also revealed intricate details about the fixing of a number of 2010 FIFA World Cup warm-up friendly matches involving South Africa, Bulgaria, Colombia, Guatemala, Denmark, Brazil and Tanzania. The revelations were confirmed by a FIFA report, excerpts of which appeared on the New York Times a month after the book's publication.

Wilson Raj Perumal appeared in his first televised interview on 26 August 2014, on CNN. During the interview, he boasted about having fixed up to 100 games, including FIFA World Cup qualification matches.

On 17 February 2015, the investigative journalism website Invisible Dog issued a press release stating that the film rights to the book Kelong Kings were optioned by Gianni Nunnari's Hollywood Gang productions, who were developing a feature film based on the match-fixer's autobiography. Later press releases from the Invisible Dog website stated that the film rights were then optioned by Boundary Stone Films, but that they also expired before reaching production stage. The rights to the story are currently with the authors of the book 'Kelong Kings'.

On 19 February 2015, Al Jazeera English aired an investigative report called "Killing the Ball", produced by Invisible Dog, in which Wilson Raj Perumal described how he ferried the Nigerian national football team to the 2010 FIFA World Cup in South Africa by rigging their qualification match against Kenya, played on 14 November 2009, in Nairobi. The report 'Killing the Ball' was a finalist of the British Journalism Awards 2015.

Perumal has been linked to referee Ibrahim Chaibou of Niger, who was banned for life by FIFA in November 2019 for manipulating numerous results of friendly games he was assigned to officiate. Although Chaibou denied knowing Perumal, FIFA investigators linked both men. In July 2020, he was arrested in Hungary in connection with human trafficking.

In May 2025, he was convicted of human trafficking and sentenced to 11 years imprisonment.

== Personal life ==
He was formerly married to Belle Istenes (born 1991). They have four children.
