= List of football clubs in Ivory Coast =

This is a list of football (soccer) clubs in Côte d'Ivoire.

For a complete list see Category:Football clubs in Ivory Coast

== Clubs ==
=== A ===
- A.C. Bouake
- A.C. Sinfra
- A.C. Vavaou
- A.S.A.F.A.
- A.S. Beogouro
- A.S. Boda
- A.S. Breton Marcoury
- A.S. Divo
- A.S. Oume
- A.S. Prikro
- A.S. Poda
- A.S. R.A.N. Agboville
- A.S. Sempa De San Pedro
- A.S. Sotra
- A.S. Young Stars
- A.S.C. Bouake
- A.S.C. Cocody
- A.S.C. Ouragahio
- A.S.I. D'Abengourou
- Abidjan Universite Club
- Academie de Sefa
- Académie de Sol Beni
- Africa Sport Abidjan
- Aeroport F.C.
- AFA Djekanou Moossou
- Agneby F.C.
- Akouye F.C.
- AS Athletic FC Daoukro
- AS Denguele Odienne
- ASC Ouragahio
- ASEC Mimosas Abidjan
- Assoue
- Athletic FC Adjame
- Atlantique Saint Michel
- Avenir Biankouma

=== B ===
- Bale Sports Buyo
- Ban Sport Danane
- Boca Sports De Bocanda
- Bonoua Sports
- Botro F.C.
- Bouake Universite Club

=== C ===
- C.I.D.I.A.F.A. Yopougon
- C.N.O.U.
- Club Omnisport Bouaflé
- C.O.S.A.P.
- C.O.S.A. San Pedro
- Centre De Formation Selaf
- Club Omnisport Korhogo
- Cosmos F.C.
- cf technicko

=== D ===
- Denguelé Sports d'Odienné
- Djibetoa Tabou

=== E ===
- E.B.C. Arrah
- E.C.A.F.
- E.E.C.I.
- E.F.C. Soubre
- E.F.Y.M.
- E.S. Senou
- Edus D'Aboisso
- ES Bingerville
- Espoir Daloa
- Espoir Koumassi
- Esperance Football Club de Bouake (EFCB)

=== F ===
- FC Adzopé
- F.C. Hire
- F.C. Yokolo

=== G ===
- Galaxie J.S.I.
- Gbalet S.P. Du Buyo
- Guerry F.C.

=== I ===
- Issia Wazi FC

=== J ===
- J.A.C. Zuenoula
- J.S. Beoumi
- J.S. Katiola
- Jeunesse Club Abidjan
- Juventus D'Alepe

=== K ===
- Kantro Sports Guiglo

=== L ===
- Lagoke F.C.
- Lahou Essor
- Lakota F.C.
- Lazer
- LYS Sassandra

=== M ===
- M.F.C. Tankesse
- Man FC
- Mela F.C.
- Makan F.C.
- Mala Sport
- Moossou F.C.

=== N ===
- N'zi F.C. Dimbokro
- Nicla Sports
- Nigou F.C.
- Niyou F.C.

=== O ===
- Olympic Club Abidjan
- Omness De Dabou
- Onze Freres
- Oryx F.C. Yopougon

=== P ===
- Paloma F.C.
- Panification Industrielle Christian (P.I.C.)

=== R ===
- R.C. Beniakrou
- R.C. Bettie
- R.C. Koumassi
- R.C. Tiassale
- R.F.C. Daoukro
- R.F.C. Yamoussoukro
- R.X. Abobo
- Rayon Esperance Marcory
- Red Star Abidjan
- Renaissance Abengourou
- Réveil Club de Daloa
- Rio Sport d'Anyama

=== S ===
- Sabé Sports de Bouna
- Sacraboutou
- Satellite FC du Plateau Abidjan
- Selafe Treichville
- Séwé Sports de San Pedro
- Sigui Sport
- Siguilo Seguela
- Silveyre Star Koumassi
- Siroco F.C.
- Sporting Club de Gagnoa
- S.O.A.
- Stade Breton
- Stade d'Abidjan
- Stella Club d'Adjamé

=== T ===
- AS Tanda
- Toulepleu F.C.
- Toumodi F.C.

=== U ===
- U.S. Bella
- U.S. Duekoue
- U.S.Koumassi F.C.
- U.S. Yakro
- U.S. Yamoussoukro
- USC Bassam
- Union S. Man

=== V ===
- Vallee A.C. D'Adjame

=== W ===
- W.A.C. De Williamsville
- W.A.C. Gagnoa
- W.A.C. Selafe

=== Y ===
- Yogoma Sport

=== Z ===
- Zanzan F.C.

== Leagues ==
1.Liga

- ASEC Mimosas
- Académie F.A. Diallo
- Stella Club d'Adjamé
- Séwé Sports de San-Pédro
- Denguelé Sports d'Odienné
- Jeunesse Club d'Abidjan
- Africa Sports
- Société Omnisports de l'Armée
- ASC Ouragahio
- Issia Wazi FC
- LYS Sassandra
- Stade d'Abidjan
- Sabé Sports de Bouna
- USC Bassam
- Football Club Hiré

2.Liga

- Football Club Adzopé
- Man FC
- Ecole de Football Yéo Martial(EFYM)
- EDUS Aboisso
- Oryx FC de Yopougon
- RC Koumassi
- CO Korhogo
- USK Koumassi
- Espoir de Koumassi
- AS AGIR Guibéroua
- AS Athlétic Adjamé
- Moossou FC
- RC Béttié
- SS Bondoukou
- US Fermiers Agnibilékrou
- CO Bouaflé
- NZi FC
- Hiré FC
- Ban Sport
- Lakota FC
- ASI d'Abengourou
- US Yamoussoukro
- ASC Ouragahio
- RFC Daoukro

3.Liga

- ECAF Abidjan
- Cosmos Football Club de Koumassi
- Williamsville Athletic Club
- Rio-Sports d'Anyama
- AS Juventus d'Alépé
- Satellite Football Club du Plateau
- Agnéby Sport d'Agboville
- ASC Cocody
- Tchéloué Football Club de Adiaké
- Moossou FC de Grand-Bassam
- Santa Cruz d'Alépé
- Racing Football
- CO Cyril Domoraud
- Sikensi Football Club
- Siguilolo FC de Séguéla
- Nicla Sport de Guiglo
- AS Espérance Bafing
- Jeunesse Athletic Club de Zuénoula
- Niyou Football Club de Niedrou
- AS AGIR Guibéroua
- AS Gbalet Sport de Buyo
- US Gadouan
- AS Sempa de San-Pédro
- AS Union Sportive Diégonéfla
- COSAP de San-Pédro
- FC San-Pédro
- AS Tanda
- RFC Yamoussoukro
- Guery Football Club
- AFAD Académie Amadou Diallo de Djékanou
- Renaissance Club de Tiassalé
- Kokumbo Football Club
- RFC Daoukro
- Toumodi Football Club
- Mala Sport
- Sigui Sport de Gouméré
- Association Sportive Divo
- Egnanda FC de Zaranou

4.Liga

- ASA de Sankadiokro
- EBC d'Arrah
- FC Moussa LEAO d'Agnibilékrou
- US d'Apprompron
- USC d'Adzopé

Ligue d'Abidjan nord 1

- AS Pierre Mereaud de Memni
- Royal Atlantic de Djibi
- Futur RPO d'Azaguié
- AS young star de Montezo

Ligue d'Abidjan nord 2

- OMNESS de Dabou
- ES Abobo
- US 3A FC de Jacqueville
- Star Olympic d'Achokoi
- ASAFA d'Agboville
- AS Rubino

Ligue de Yamoussoukro

- AS Daoukro
- US Sakassou
- Kanbonou FC de Tiébissou
- Élan sportif de Boundiali
- N’demagnon de Touba

Ligue d'Abidjan sud 1

- Bonoua sports
- Pirates de Samo
- US Krindjabo
- ASCI d'Assinie
- Adinglo FC De Ahigbe Koffikro
- Schadrac FC Maféré

Ligue d'Abidjan sud 2

- JFC sud Comoe d'Aboisso
- Selafe FC d'Abidjan
- CIDIAFA d'Abidjan
- ECAF d'Abidjan

Ligue de San-Pédro 1

- FC Soubré
- Siroco de San-Pédro
- Phare sport de Tabou
- AS Stevicor de Sassandra

Ligue de San-Pédro 2

- Lahou essor de Grand-Lahou
- Athlantis FC de Sassandra
- Yocoboué FC
- Fresco FC

Ligue de Bondoukou 1

- Yegueman de Sandégué
- SIGUI sport de Gouméré
- Sorobango FC
- AS KPODA de Songouri
- Sapli Hossi sport de Sapli

Ligue de Bondoukou 2

- Tankesse FC de Tankessé
- Djara sport d'Assuéfry
- Effieni sport de Guiendé
- Nagabari FC de Tabagne

Ligue de Bouaké 1

- AS juventus de Katiola
- Djidja FC de Dabakala
- TNCA de Niakara
- AUKAS FC de Botro
- ASC Bouaké

Ligue de Bouaké 2

- Diamasse de M'bahiakro
- Bouaké FC
- Espérance de Bouaké
- Alliance club de Bouaké

Ligue de Daloa 1

- Yokolo FC
- Tizake de Gbohué
- St Raphael FC de Bouaflé
- CIFAD de Gonaté
- AS Binkady de Zoukougbeu

Ligue de Daloa 2

- AS Gnagbodougnoa
- Atomic de Lakota
- ES COD Dairo de Divo
- Toutoubré FC de Toutoubré
- US Bayota
- Zoukobouo

Ligue de Man 1

- Angelique FC de Man
- Kouibly FC de Kouibly
- Makinde FC de Sangouiné
- Degnan academy FC de Facobly
- Cefat FC de Gbonné
- Tonkpi FC de Logoualé

Ligue de Man 2

- Niyou FC de Diéouzon
- Koulayae de Blolequin
- Football club de Zou
- Peko FC de Bangolo
- Espoir de Guézon
