= 2019–20 Ligue 1 (Ivory Coast) =

Côte d'Ivoire Ligue 1
- Season: 2019–20
- Dates: 17 August 2019 – 8 March 2020
- Champions: Racing Club Abidjan
- Relegated: None
- CAF Champions League: Racing Club Abidjan
- CAF Confederation Cup: FC San Pédro
- Matches: 140
- Goals: 311 (2.22 per match)
- Biggest home win: ASEC Mimosas 4–0 AS Tanda (4 December 2019)
- Biggest away win: Williamsville 2–7 AS Tanda (22 February 2020) Issia Wazi 1–6 AFAD (9 February 2020)
- Highest scoring: Williamsville 2–7 AS Tanda (22 February 2020)
- Longest winning run: Racing Club Abidjan, FC San-Pédro & AS Tanda (4 matches)
- Longest unbeaten run: USC Bassam (9 matches)
- Longest winless run: Williamsville (12 matches)
- Longest losing run: Issia Wazi (6 matches)
- All statistics correct as of 2 July 2020.

The 2019–20 Côte d'Ivoire Ligue 1 is the 61st season of the Côte d'Ivoire Ligue 1, the top-tier league of the Ivorian football league system since its establishment in 1960.The season started on 17 August 2019 but was suspended on 8 March 2020 due to the effects of the COVID-19 pandemic.

On 26 June 2020 however, the FIF announced that the season has been cancelled due to the coronavirus pandemic. Racing Club Abidjan were crowned champions and will represent the country at the 2020–21 CAF Champions League while there would be no relegation with the two teams promoting from the Ligue 2 expanding the league to 16 starting from the next season.

They further stated that the 2020 Coupe de Côte d'Ivoire has been cancelled, with second-place finishers, FC San Pédro representing the country at the 2020–21 CAF Confederation Cup.

SO de l'Armée were the defending champions, winning the championship in the 2018-2019 season.

== Teams ==
Fourteen teams contested the league, twelve teams from the previous season and two promoted teams from the 2018–19 Ligue Two; SOL FC and Issia Wazi who replaced LYS Sassandra and Moossou FC as they were relegated from the previous season.

There would be no relegation this season.

Note: Table lists in alphabetical order.

Team	Location	Stadium	Capacity
AFAD Djékanou	Abidjan	Stade Municipal d'Abidjan	1,100
Africa Sports d'Abidjan	Abidjan	Stade Robert Champroux	10,000
ASEC Mimosas	Abidjan	Stade Félix Houphouët-Boigny	50,000
AS Indenié Abengourou	Abengourou	Stade Henri Konan Bédié	3,000
USC Bassam	Grand-Bassam	Stade Municipal de Bassam	5,000
Bouaké FC	Bouaké	Stade Bouaké	35,000
Issia Wazi	Issia	Stade d'Issia	3,000
Racing Club Abidjan	Abidjan	Stade Félix Houphouët-Boigny	50,000
FC San Pédro	San-Pédro	Stade Auguste Denise	8,000
SO de l'Armée	Yamoussoukro	Stade de Yamoussoukro	6,000
Stars Olympic Club Abobo	Abidjan	Stade Robert Champroux	10,000
SC Gagnoa	Gagnoa	Stade Victor Biaka Boda	20,000
AS Tanda	Abengourou	Stade Henri Konan Bédié	3,000
Williamsville	Abidjan	Stade Robert Champroux	10,000

== Locations of teams ==
Locations of the 2019–20 Cote d'Ivoire Ligue 1 teams

== League table ==
Pos	Team	Pld	W	D	L	GF	GA	GD	Pts	Qualification
1	Racing Club Abidjan	20	11	5	4	28	20	+8	38	Qualification to the 2020–21 CAF Champions League
2	FC San Pédro (Note: Since the 2020 Coupe de Côte d'Ivoire was cancelled, FC San-Pédro shall represent the country at the 2020–21 CAF Confederation Cup.)	20	11	2	7	22	17	+5	35	Qualification to the 2020–21 CAF Confederation Cup
3	ASEC Mimosas	20	10	4	6	29	16	+13	34	
4	SO de l'Armée	20	9	6	5	25	18	+7	33	
5	AFAD Djékanou	20	9	5	6	27	21	+6	32	
6	USC Bassam	20	7	9	4	21	15	+6	30	
7	AS Tanda	20	9	3	8	30	28	+2	30	
8	AS Indenié Abengourou	20	6	9	5	16	17	−1	27	
9	SOL FC	20	7	6	7	17	19	−2	27	
10	Africa Sports d'Abidjan	20	5	8	7	21	29	−8	23	
11	SC Gagnoa	20	4	9	7	21	22	−1	21	
12	Bouaké FC	20	4	7	9	19	23	−4	19	
13	Williamsville	20	3	6	11	19	35	−16	15	
14	Issia Wazi	20	2	7	11	16	31	−15	13	

Source: Soccerway
Rules for classification: 1) points; 2) goal difference; 3) number of goals scored

== Results ==
Home \ Away	ABE	AFAD	ASA	ASEC	BAS	BOU	ISS	RCA	SAN	SOA	SOL	GAG	TAN	WAC
AS Indenié Abengourou	—	0–2	1–1	2–0	1–1			0–1	0–1	0–2	0–0	1–1		1–0
AFAD Djékanou	0–0	—	1–0	1–3		2–2	3–1	1–2	1–0			1–1	0–2	1–2
Africa Sports d'Abidjan	1–1	3–1	—	1–0	0–2	1–1	1–1	1–0	2–1				2–4	2–2
ASEC Mimosas		1–0		—	1–1	1–0	2–0	1–1	0–1	1–2	4–1	1–0	4–0	3–1
USC Bassam		1–1	3–0		—	1–2	2–1	1–3		2–2	0–0	1–1	0–1	0–1
Bouaké FC	1–2			0–0	0–1	—	0–3	1–1	0–2		0–0	0–1	3–0	3–2
Issia Wazi	1–1	1–6		0–2	0–0	1–1	—	1–1		0–1	1–2		0–2	1–1
Racing Club Abidjan		0–0	1–0	2–1	1–1	0–3		—		1–2	1–0	2–0	3–2	2–1
FC San Pédro	3–0	0–1	2–0		0–2	1–0	1–2	0–3	—	1–0	1–0	3–2	1–1	
SO de l'Armée	0–0	0–1	1–1	1–0		2–1	2–1		2–3	—	0–1		2–0	2–0
SOL FC	1–1		3–0	1–1	0–1	0–0	0–0	3–1	0–1	2–2	—		1–2	
SC Gagnoa												—		
AS Tanda	0–1		1–2		0–1		2–1			0–0	3–2	0–2	—	2–0
Williamsville	0–2	1–2	2–2		0–0			1–2	0–0	2–2	0–1	1–0	2–7	—

Source: Soccerstats
Legend: Blue = home team win; Yellow = draw; Red = away team win.

== See also ==
- 2019–20 Nigeria Professional Football League
- 2019–20 Elite One
- 2019–20 Ghana Premier League
