= 2016–17 Ligue 1 (Ivory Coast) =

Ligue 1
- Season: 2016–17
- Matches: 150
- Goals: 275 (1.83 per match)
- Top goalscorer: (Burkina Faso) Aristide Bancé
- Biggest home win: 2 matches: ASEC Mimosas 4–0 JCAT (3 December 2016); San-Pédro 4-0 Sporting Gagnoa (26 February 2017)
- Biggest away win: 2 matches: AFAD 0–3 Sporting Gagnoa (22 February 2017); Moossou 0-3 AFAD (3 March 2017)
- Highest scoring: Stade d'Abidjan 3–4 Moossou (11 January 2017)
- Longest winning run: WAC (5)
- Longest unbeaten run: Abengourou; Denguélé; Tanda (11)
- Longest winless run: JCAT (12)
- Longest losing run: JCAT (5)
- All statistics correct as of 21 May 2017.

The 2016–17 Ligue 1 was the 58th season of top-tier football in Côte d'Ivoire. The season began on 19 November 2016. AS Tanda are the defending champions, having won each of the last two titles.

The league comprises 14 teams, the bottom two of which will be relegated to the 2017-18 Ligue 2.

== Teams ==
A total of 14 teams will contest the league, including 12 sides from the 2015–16 season and two promoted from the 2015–16 Ligue 2, San-Pédro and WAC. On the other hand, Korhogo and Yopougon were the last two teams of the 2015–16 season and will play in Ligue 2 for the 2016–17 season. AS Tanda are the defending champions from the 2015–16 season.

=== Stadiums and locations ===
Locations of the 2014–15 Ligue 1 teams

Team	Home city	Stadium	Capacity	2013 season
Academie de Foot Amadou Diallo	Abidjan	Stade Robert Champroux	20,000	10th in Ligue 1
ASEC Mimosas	Abidjan	Stade Robert Champroux	20,000	6th in Ligue 1
AS Indenié Abengourou	Abengourou	Stade Henri Konan Bédié	3,000	4th in Ligue 1
Africa Sports d'Abidjan	Abidjan	Stade Robert Champroux	20,000	8th in Ligue 1
AS Denguélé	Bouaké	Stade de Bouaké	35,000	5th in Ligue 1
Jeunesse Club d'Abidjan	Abidjan	Parc des Sports de Treichville	4,000	12th in Ligue 1
Moossou FC	Grand-Bassam	Stade Municipal de Grand-Bassam	3,000	9th in Ligue 1
San Pédro	San-Pédro			Ligue 2
Société Omnisports de l'Armée	Yamoussoukro	Stade de Yamoussoukro	6,000	11th in Ligue 1
Sporting Club de Gagnoa	Gagnoa	Stade Victor Biaka Boda	5,000	3rd in Ligue 1
Stade d'Abidjan	Abidjan	Stade Robert Champroux	20,000	7th in Ligue 1
Séwé Sport de San-Pédro	San Pédro	Stade Auguste Denise	8,000	2nd in Ligue 1
Association Sportive Tanda	Abengourou	Stade Henri Konan Bédié	3,000	Ligue 1 Champions
Williamsville AC	Adjamé			Ligue 2

== League table ==
Pos	Team	Pld	W	D	L	GF	GA	GD	Pts	Qualification or relegation
1	ASEC Mimosas (C, Q)	26	12	9	5	30	16	+14	45	2018 CAF Champions League
2	Williamsville AC (Q)	26	12	8	6	34	20	+14	44	2018 CAF Champions League
3	Tanda (Q)	26	10	11	5	24	17	+7	41	2018 CAF Confederation Cup
4	Africa Sports	26	11	7	8	22	16	+6	40	
5	AFAD	26	9	12	5	28	22	+6	39	
6	SOA	26	9	10	7	21	19	+2	37	
7	Stade d'Abidjan	26	9	9	8	24	22	+2	36	
8	Séwé Sport	26	10	6	10	25	28	−3	36	
9	San Pédro	26	7	11	8	26	23	+3	32	
10	Abengourou	26	6	14	6	16	18	−2	32	
11	Moossou	26	9	5	12	23	28	−5	32	
12	Sporting Gagnoa	26	8	8	10	17	23	−6	32	
13	Denguélé (R)	26	5	10	11	23	33	−10	25	Relegation to 2018 Ligue 2
14	JCAT (R)	26	3	4	19	15	43	−28	13	Relegation to 2018 Ligue 2

Updated to match(es) played on 3 July 2017. Source: soccerway.com
Rules for classification: 1) points; 2) goal difference; 3) goals scored; 4) head-to-head points; 5) head-to-head goal difference
(C) Champions; (Q) Qualified for the phase indicated; (R) Relegated

== Positions by round ==
Leader
2016 CAF Champions League or 2016 CAF Confederation Cup
Relegation to Ligue 2

Team ╲ Round	1	2	3	4	5	6	7	8	9	10	11	12	13	14	15	16	17	18	19	20	21	22	23	24	25	26
ASEC Mimosas	1	2	1	1	1	1	1	2	2	2	2	1	1	1	1	1	1	1	1	1	1	1				
WAC	2	3	2	2	2	2	4	5	5	5	6	9	8	5	3	3	2	2	2	2	2	2				
Africa Sports	3	1	6	3	3	5	2	4	7	8	9	5	3	3	4	4	4	4	7	4	3					
SOA	9	8	9	9	7	8	8	9	9	7	4	7	9	10	11	7	5	3	4	5	4					
Tanda	13	13	8	8	8	9	9	8	8	9	7	4	4	6	5	5	8	7	3	7	5					
Séwé Sport	3	4	5	5	9	6	3	1	1	1	1	2	2	2	2	2	3	5	5	3	6					
Sporting Gagnoa	9	10	12	12	12	12	12	13	12	11	13	12	10	7	7	10	12	12	8	6	7					
Stade d'Abidjan	7	12	14	14	10	10	10	10	11	12	11	13	13	9	10	5	8	6	6	8	9	8				
San Pédro	9	10	11	11	13	14	14	14	14	13	12	11	12	13	9	12	7	9	10	9	8					
AFAD	3	4	3	4	4	7	7	3	3	6	8	3	5	4	6	9	11	10	9	11	10					
Denguélé	14	14	13	13	14	11	11	11	10	10	10	10	11	12	13	8	10	11	12	10	11					
Abengourou	7	9	7	7	6	4	5	6	6	4	5	8	7	11	8	11	6	8	11	12	12					
Moossou	3	6	4	5	5	3	6	7	4	3	3	6	6	8	12	13	13	13	13	13	13	13				
JCAT	9	7	10	10	11	13	13	12	13	14	14	14	14	14	14	14	14	14	14	14	14	14	14			

Updated to match(es) played on 21 May 2017. Source: Soccerway
