= 2023–24 Ligue 1 (Ivory Coast) =

74th season of Ivory Coast Ligue 1

Ligue 1
- Season: 2023–24
- Champions: FC San Pedro
- Relegated: Bouaké FC; AS Indenié Abengourou
- Champions League: FC San Pedro; Stade d'Abidjan
- Confederation Cup: Racing d'Abidjan
- Top goalscorer: Souleymane Kanté (Ivory Coast) Stéphane Bedi (15 goals each)

The 2023–24 Ligue 1 was the 74th season of the top-flight football league in Ivory Coast. It was won by FC San Pedro, with which they qualify for the CAF Champions League for the first time. Despite finishing 4th on the table, Racing d'Abidjan qualified for the CAF Confederation Cup, also for the first time, by virtue of with the 2023–24 Coupe de Côte d'Ivoire.

Zoman FC and Mouna FC were promoted to the top-flight for this season, replacing ES Bafing and USC Bassam, who were relegated following the conclusion of the previous season.

== League table ==
Pos	Team	Pld	W	D	L	GF	GA	GD	Pts	Qualification or relegation
1	San-Pédro (C)	30	17	5	8	47	29	+18	56	Qualification for the CAF Champions League
2	Stade d'Abidjan	30	14	9	7	41	24	+17	51	Qualification for the CAF Champions League
3	Racing d'Abidjan (Note: Qualified by winning the 2023–24 Coupe de Côte d'Ivoire.)	30	14	9	7	41	27	+14	51	Qualification for the CAF Confederation Cup
4	ASEC Mimosas	30	14	8	8	31	15	+16	50	Qualification for the CAF Confederation Cup
5	Stella	30	13	6	11	39	29	+10	45	
6	Zoman	30	11	10	9	29	27	+2	43	
7	AFAD	30	11	9	10	29	27	+2	42	
8	SOA	30	11	9	10	33	32	+1	42	
9	SOL FC	30	10	10	10	32	31	+1	40	
10	Korhogo	30	10	10	10	31	31	0	40	
11	LYS Sassandra	30	9	9	12	32	32	0	36	
12	Denguélé	30	9	9	12	31	47	−16	36	
13	Bouaké	30	8	9	13	29	39	−10	33	
14	Mouna	30	8	8	14	26	43	−17	32	
15	Sporting Gagnoa	30	6	10	14	19	37	−18	28	Relegation
16	Indenié Abengourou	30	6	8	16	27	47	−20	26	Relegation

Updated to match(es) played on 1 June 2024. Source: Soccerway
Rules for classification: 1) points; 2) goal difference; 3) number of goals scored.
(C) Champions

== Top goalscorers ==
Rank	Player	Team	Goals
1	Abdoulaye Kanté	Racing Club	15
1	(Ivory Coast) Stéphane Bedi	San Pedro	15
3	(Ivory Coast) Jean-Charles Ahoua	Stella Club	12
4	(Ivory Coast) Sou D'avila	LYS Sassandra	11
5	(Ivory Coast) Pokou N'guessan	ASEC Mimosas	10
5	Koné Seydou	ASI Abengourou	10

== Attendances ==
#	Football club	Average attendance
1	ASEC Mimosas	1,012
2	Stade d'Abidjan	806
3	RC Abidjan	567
4	Zoman FC	479
5	FC San-Pédro	420
6	SOA	364
7	SOL FC	362
8	LYS Sassandra	346
9	Bouaké FC	292
10	Stella Club d'Adjamé	266
11	SC Gagnoa	226
12	CO Korhogo	181
13	ASI Abengourou	172
14	AFAD Djékanou	164
15	FC Mouna	162
16	AS Denguélé	158
