= 2022–23 Ligue 1 (Ivory Coast) =

Ligue One
- Season: 2022–23
- Champions: ASEC Mimosas

The 2022—23 Ligue 1 was a season of top-flight football in Ivory Coast.

The league expanded from 14 to 16 teams, and the federation also announced a four-team playoff to end the regular season. However, the federation ended up cancelling the play-off after the season, giving ASEC Mimosas their 29th overall title. Since teams would have taken half of their points into the six-game rectangular play-off, Mimosas would have started with around a four-point lead.

ES Bafing were relegated on the final day of the season despite starting the round outside the relegation zone and drawing AFAD 0–0, who also needed a win to guarantee their spot in the cancelled play-off, but were leaped by ASI d'Abengourou who won their final match of the season.

AFAD Djékanou qualified for the Confederation Cup as the cup runners-up.

== League Table ==
Pos	Team	Pld	W	D	L	GF	GA	GD	Pts	Qualification or relegation
1	ASEC Mimosas (C)	30	17	12	1	37	14	+23	63	Champions, Qualification to the 2023–24 CAF Champions League
2	SO de l'Armée	30	14	12	4	45	24	+21	54	
3	FC San Pedro	30	15	6	9	39	26	+13	51	
4	Sporting Gagnoa	30	14	7	9	36	31	+5	49	
5	AFAD Djékanou	30	11	14	5	28	16	+12	47	Qualification to the 2023–24 CAF Confederation Cup
6	Racing d'Abidjan	30	11	10	9	48	41	+7	43	
7	Stella	30	12	7	11	30	23	+7	43	
8	Stade d'Abidjan	30	11	7	12	31	34	−3	40	
9	SOL	30	10	8	12	27	29	−2	38	
10	Denguélé	30	10	6	14	30	36	−6	36	
11	LYS Sassandra	30	7	14	9	31	33	−2	35	
12	CO Korhogo	30	7	10	13	27	40	−13	31	
13	Bouaké	30	7	10	13	25	42	−17	31	
14	AS Indenié Abengourou	30	7	9	14	22	37	−15	30	
15	ES Bafing (R)	30	7	8	15	25	40	−15	29	Relegation
16	USC Bassam (R)	30	5	10	15	24	39	−15	25	Relegation

Rules for classification: 1) points; 2) goal difference; 3) number of goals scored.
(C) Champions; (R) Relegated

== Top goalscorers ==
Rank	Player	Team	Goals
1	(Ivory Coast) Bérenger Diaby Gautier	San Pédro	14
2	(Ivory Coast) Brahima Ouattara	RC Abidjan	13
3	(Ivory Coast) Avo Leibé Junior	ES Bafing	10
4	(Ivory Coast) Arsène Adom	Stella	9
4	(Ivory Coast) Mohamed Lamine Koné	Bouaké	9
4	(Ivory Coast) Patrick Ouotro	LYS Sassandra	9
