= 2015–16 Ligue 1 (Ivory Coast) =

Ligue 1
- Season: 2015–16
- Champions: Tanda
- Relegated: Korhogo; Yopougon
- 2017 CAF Champions League: Séwé Sport; Tanda
- 2017 CAF Confederation Cup: Abengourou; Sporting Gagnoa
- Matches: 182
- Goals: 359 (1.97 per match)
- Biggest home win: 2 matches: Abengourou 4–0 Yopougon (12 December 2015); Denguélé 4-0 Moossou (3 July 2016)
- Biggest away win: 2 matches: Yopougon 0–4 Tanda (18 February 2016); Africa Sports 0-4 Tanda (13 August 2016)
- Highest scoring: 3 matches: Stade d'Abidjan 3–4 Denguélé (2 June 2016); Sporting Gagnoa 5-2 Korhogo (3 July 2016); Denguélé 4-3 Korhogo (13 August 2016)
- Longest winning run: Tanda (6)
- Longest unbeaten run: Sporting Gagnoa (15)
- Longest winless run: SOA (15)
- Longest losing run: JCAT; Korhogo (6)
- All statistics correct as of 11 September 2016.

The 2015–16 Ligue 1 is the 57th season of top-tier football in Côte d'Ivoire. The season began on 28 November 2015. AS Tanda defended their first league title, holding off Séwé Sport by going unbeaten in their last eight matches.

The league comprised 14 teams, the bottom two of which, Korhogo and Yopougon, were relegated to the 2017 Ligue 2.

== Teams ==
A total of 14 teams will contest the league, including 12 sides from the 2014–15 season and two promoted from the 2014–15 Ligue 2, Moossou FC and Yopougon FC. On the other hand, Bouaké FC and Stella Club d'Adjamé were the last two teams of the 2014–15 season and will play in Ligue 2 for the 2015-16 season. AS Tanda are the defending champions from the 2014–15 season.

=== Stadiums and locations ===
Locations of the 2014–15 Ligue 1 teams

Team	Home city	Stadium	Capacity	2013 season
Academie de Foot Amadou Diallo	Abidjan	Stade Robert Champroux	20,000	8th in Ligue 1
ASEC Mimosas	Abidjan	Stade Robert Champroux	20,000	2nd in Ligue 1
AS Indenié Abengourou	Abengourou	Stade Henri Konan Bédié	3,000	9th in Ligue 1
Africa Sports d'Abidjan	Abidjan	Stade Robert Champroux	20,000	4th in Ligue 1
AS Denguélé	Bouaké	Stade de Bouaké	35,000	12th in Ligue 1
Jeunesse Club d'Abidjan	Abidjan	Parc des Sports de Treichville	4,000	11th in Ligue 1
CO Korhogo	Bouaké	Stade de Bouaké	35,000	10th in Ligue 1
Moossou FC	Grand-Bassam	Stade Municipal de Grand-Bassam	3,000	Ligue 2
Société Omnisports de l'Armée	Yamoussoukro	Stade de Yamoussoukro	6,000	7th in Ligue 1
Sporting Club de Gagnoa	Gagnoa	Stade Victor Biaka Boda	5,000	3rd in Ligue 1
Stade d'Abidjan	Abidjan	Stade Robert Champroux	20,000	5th in Ligue 1
Séwé Sport de San-Pédro	San Pédro	Stade Auguste Denise	8,000	6th in Ligue 1
Association Sportive Tanda	Abengourou	Stade Henri Konan Bédié	3,000	Ligue 1 Champions
Yopougon FC	Yopougon	Stade de Anguédédou		Ligue 2

== League table ==
Pos	Team	Pld	W	D	L	GF	GA	GD	Pts	Qualification or relegation
1	Tanda (C, Q)	26	14	7	5	29	17	+12	49	2017 CAF Champions League
2	Séwé Sport (Q)	26	12	9	5	31	20	+11	45	2017 CAF Champions League
3	Sporting Gagnoa (Q)	26	11	12	3	25	17	+8	45	2017 CAF Confederation Cup
4	Abengourou (Q)	26	10	12	4	29	17	+12	42	2017 CAF Confederation Cup
5	Denguélé	26	10	11	5	32	24	+8	41	
6	ASEC Mimosas	26	8	12	6	21	15	+6	36	
7	Stade d'Abidjan	26	10	5	11	31	27	+4	35	
8	Africa Sports	26	9	6	11	29	30	−1	33	
9	Moossou	26	7	10	9	25	28	−3	31	
10	AFAD	26	8	6	12	25	27	−2	30	
11	SOA	26	7	8	11	23	32	−9	29	
12	JCAT	26	5	12	9	20	28	−8	27	
13	Yopougon (R)	26	5	7	14	15	39	−24	22	Relegation to 2017 Ligue 2
14	Korhogo (R)	26	4	7	15	24	38	−14	19	Relegation to 2017 Ligue 2

Updated to match(es) played on 11 September 2016. Source: soccerway.com
Rules for classification: 1) points; 2) goal difference; 3) goals scored; 4) head-to-head points; 5) head-to-head goal difference
(C) Champions; (Q) Qualified for the phase indicated; (R) Relegated

== Positions by round ==
Leader
2016 CAF Champions League or 2016 CAF Confederation Cup
Relegation to Ligue 2

Team ╲ Round	1	2	3	4	5	6	7	8	9	10	11	12	13	14	15	16	17	18	19	20	21	22	23	24	25	26
Tanda	10	8	12	14	9	7	5	1	1	1	1	1	1	1	1	1	1	2	2	1	1	1	2	1	1	1
Séwé Sport	10	13	10	5	7	9	9	8	8	8	7	8	9	7	7	4	2	3	3	2	3	4	4	4	3	2
Sporting Gagnoa	10	11	13	12	12	12	12	11	11	11	11	9	10	10	9	9	6	7	6	4	4	2	1	2	2	3
Abengourou	7	10	4	6	5	5	6	7	7	7	10	7	8	6	10	10	8	8	7	5	5	5	5	5	5	4
Denguélé	10	11	8	8	10	10	10	9	9	9	4	5	5	2	3	5	3	1	1	3	2	3	3	3	4	5
ASEC Mimosas	7	9	6	7	8	8	8	10	10	10	6	10	6	8	5	2	4	5	5	7	7	6	6	6	7	6
Stade d'Abidjan	1	6	9	9	6	4	3	2	3	2	2	2	2	4	2	3	7	4	4	6	8	7	7	7	6	7
Africa Sports	1	2	2	4	2	2	2	5	5	5	9	3	4	5	8	8	10	10	9	10	6	8	8	9	9	8
Moossou	1	3	1	1	1	1	1	3	4	4	5	6	7	9	6	7	9	9	8	9	10	11	9	10	10	9
AFAD	10	13	14	13	14	11	11	12	13	14	13	12	12	12	11	11	11	11	11	11	11	9	10	8	8	10
SOA	1	1	3	2	3	3	4	4	6	6	8	11	11	11	12	12	12	12	12	12	12	12	12	12	11	11
JCAT	6	5	5	3	4	6	7	6	2	3	3	4	3	3	4	6	5	6	10	8	9	10	11	11	12	12
Yopougon	9	7	11	11	13	14	14	14	14	13	12	13	14	14	14	14	14	14	14	14	14	13	13	13	13	13
Korhogo	1	3	7	10	11	13	13	13	12	12	14	14	13	13	13	13	13	13	13	13	13	14	14	14	14	14

Updated to match(es) played on 11 September 2015. Source: Soccerway

== Season statistics ==
=== Scoring ===
- First goal of the season: Krahire Yannick Zakri for ASEC against Abengourou (28 November 2015)
