= 2014–15 Ligue 1 (Ivory Coast) =

Ligue 1
- Season: 2014–15
- Champions: Tanda
- Relegated: Bouaké; Stella
- 2016 CAF Champions League: ASEC; Tanda
- 2016 CAF Confederation Cup: Africa Sports; Sporting Gagnoa
- Matches: 182
- Goals: 307 (1.69 per match)
- Biggest home win: 6 matches: Stade d'Abidjan 3–0 Korhogo (7 December 2014); JCAT 3–0 Stella (19 December 2014); SOA 3–0 Séwé Sport (11 April 2015); Stade d'Abidjan 3–0 Africa Sports (25 April 2015); AFAD 3–0 Stella (1 June 2015); SOA 3–0 Bouaké (16 August 2015)
- Biggest away win: 2 matches: JCAT 0–4 Séwé Sport (9 March 2015); Stella 1–5 Sporting Gagnoa (22 June 2015)
- Highest scoring: Stade d'Abidjan 5–3 Séwé Sport (20 June 2015)
- Longest winning run: Tanda (6)
- Longest unbeaten run: Sporting Gagnoa (15)
- Longest winless run: Bouaké (8)
- Longest losing run: Denguélé (4)

The 2014–15 Ligue 1 is the 56th season of top-tier football in Côte d'Ivoire. The season began on 28 November 2014. AS Tanda won their first league title, holding off ASEC Mimosas on the final day of the season. Entering with a one-point lead in the standings, Tanda defeated CO Korhogo 2–1 at home to clinch the title even though ASEC got a 0–1 road win at Sporting Gagnoa to keep the pressure on.

The league comprised 14 teams, the bottom two of which will be relegated to the 2016 Ligue 2. Bouaké and Stella each entered the final day of the season needing a win and to make up a large goal differential to avoid relegation, but both suffered road losses to seal their fate.

== Teams ==
A total of 14 teams will contest the league, including 12 sides from the 2013–14 season and two promoted from the 2013–14 Ligue 2, Bouaké FC and Stade d'Abidjan. On the other hand, USC Bassam and CO Bouaflé were the last two teams of the 2013–14 season and will play in Ligue 2 for the 2015 season. Séwé Sport are the defending champions from the 2013–14 season.

=== Stadiums and locations ===
Locations of the 2014–15 Ligue 1 teams

Team	Home city	Stadium	Capacity	2013 season
Academie de Foot Amadou Diallo	Abidjan	Stade Robert Champroux	20,000	5th in Ligue 1
ASEC Mimosas	Abidjan	Stade Robert Champroux	20,000	3rd in Ligue 1
AS Indenié Abengourou	Abengourou	Stade Henri Konan Bédié	3,000	10th in Ligue 1
Africa Sports d'Abidjan	Abidjan	Stade Robert Champroux	20,000	9th in Ligue 1
Bouaké FC	Bouaké	Stade de Bouaké	35,000	Ligue 2
AS Denguélé	Bouaké	Stade de Bouaké	35,000	8th in Ligue 1
Jeunesse Club d'Abidjan	Abidjan	Parc des Sports de Treichville	4,000	12th in Ligue 1
CO Korhogo	Bouaké	Stade de Bouaké	35,000	11th in Ligue 1
Société Omnisports de l'Armée	Yamoussoukro	Stade de Yamoussoukro	6,000	4th in Ligue 1
Sporting Club de Gagnoa	Gagnoa	Stade Victor Biaka Boda	5,000	2nd in Ligue 1
Stade d'Abidjan	Abidjan	Stade Robert Champroux	20,000	Ligue 2
Stella Club d'Adjamé	Abidjan	Stade Robert Champroux	20,000	7th in Ligue 1
Séwé Sport de San-Pédro	San Pédro	Stade Auguste Denise	8,000	Ligue 1 Champions
Association Sportive Tanda	Abengourou	Stade Henri Konan Bédié	3,000	6th in Ligue 1

== League table ==
Pos	Team	Pld	W	D	L	GF	GA	GD	Pts	Qualification or relegation
1	Tanda (C)	26	14	9	3	21	11	+10	51	2016 CAF Champions League
2	ASEC	26	15	5	6	26	16	+10	50	2016 CAF Champions League
3	Sporting Gagnoa	26	11	10	5	20	10	+10	43	2016 CAF Confederation Cup
4	Africa Sports	26	12	3	11	21	23	−2	39	2016 CAF Confederation Cup
5	Stade d'Abidjan	26	10	7	9	34	25	+9	37	
6	Séwé Sport	26	9	9	8	29	29	0	36	
7	SOA	26	10	5	11	25	24	+1	35	
8	AFAD	26	10	4	12	27	24	+3	34	
9	Abengourou	26	8	9	9	15	17	−2	33	
10	Korhogo	26	7	9	10	16	23	−7	30	
11	JCAT	26	7	8	11	23	26	−3	29	
12	Denguélé	26	7	7	12	16	20	−4	28	
13	Bouaké (R)	26	5	10	11	21	32	−11	25	Relegation to 2016 Ligue 2
14	Stella (R)	26	6	7	13	13	27	−14	25	Relegation to 2016 Ligue 2

Updated to match(es) played on 16 August 2015. Source: soccerway.com
Rules for classification: 1) points; 2) goal difference; 3) goals scored; 4) head-to-head points; 5) head-to-head goal difference
(C) Champions; (R) Relegated

== Results ==
All teams play in a double round robin system (home and away).

Home \ Away	AFA	ASE	ABE	AFR	BOU	DEN	JCA	KOR	SOA	SPO	STA	STE	SEW	TAN
AFAD		1–2	2–0	1–2	1–1	1–0	1–0	2–0	1–2	2–0	2–1	3–0	3–2	1–2
ASEC	2–1		1–0	2–1	3–1	1–1	2–2	1–2	1–0	0–0	0–1	0–1	1–0	1–2
Abengourou	1–0	0–1		2–1	2–1	2–1	0–0	0–0	0–0	0–1	2–1	0–1	0–1	1–0
Africa Sports	0–1	0–1	1–0		2–0	1–0	1–0	0–0	2–0	1–0	1–0	1–0	0–2	1–2
Bouaké FC	2–1	1–0	0–1	1–2		1–1	1–1	0–0	2–1	0–0	0–0	2–2	1–1	1–2
Denguélé	0–0	1–2	1–0	1–1	0–0		0–2	1–0	2–1	0–1	0–1	2–0	0–1	0–0
JCAT	1–1	0–1	0–1	1–2	2–0	1–0		2–0	1–0	0–1	2–1	3–0	0–4	1–2
Korhogo	1–0	0–1	0–0	1–0	2–1	1–0	2–0		1–3	1–2	0–0	0–2	0–1	0–0
SOA	1–0	0–0	0–0	1–0	3–0	0–1	1–1	0–0		0–2	1–3	1–0	3–0	0–1
Sporting Gagnoa	1–0	0–1	1–0	0–0	2–1	1–0	0–0	0–0	2–0		0–1	0–0	0–0	0–0
Stade d'Abidjan	1–1	0–1	1–1	3–0	1–2	2–0	2–2	3–0	0–1	1–1		1–0	5–3	2–0
Stella	0–1	1–0	1–1	0–1	0–1	0–0	1–0	1–1	1–2	1–5	1–0		0–1	0–1
Séwé Sport	1–0	0–1	1–1	2–0	1–1	0–2	2–1	1–3	2–4	0–0	3–3	0–0		0–0
Tanda	1–0	0–0	0–0	2–0	1–0	0–2	0–0	2–1	1–0	1–0	1–0	0–0	0–0	

Updated to match(es) played on 16 August 2015. Source: soccerway.com
Legend: Blue = home team win; Yellow = draw; Red = away team win.

== Positions by round ==
Leader
2016 CAF Champions League or 2016 CAF Confederation Cup
Relegation to Ligue 2

Team ╲ Round	1	2	3	4	5	6	7	8	9	10	11	12	13	14	15	16	17	18	19	20	21	22	23	24	25	26
Tanda	5	1	4	1	2	3	2	1	1	4	2	1	1	2	3	3	3	2	2	2	1	1	1	1	1	1
ASEC	5	2	3	5	1	1	1	3	2	1	1	3	3	1	1	1	1	1	1	1	2	2	2	2	2	2
Sporting Gagnoa	9	9	8	6	8	6	5	4	3	2	3	2	2	3	2	2	2	3	3	3	3	3	3	3	3	3
Africa Sports	5	2	1	2	3	2	4	5	5	3	4	4	5	6	4	5	6	4	4	5	6	6	6	4	4	4
Stade d'Abidjan	8	6	9	8	6	7	7	6	7	8	9	7	7	7	7	7	4	5	6	8	4	4	4	5	5	5
Séwé Sport	12	13	13	9	10	10	9	12	12	12	12	13	13	13	14	14	13	13	13	12	11	11	9	8	7	6
SOA	1	4	2	4	5	8	8	9	9	9	8	6	6	5	6	4	5	6	5	6	7	7	7	9	8	7
AFAD	4	5	7	10	7	4	3	2	4	5	6	5	4	4	5	6	7	7	8	4	5	5	5	6	6	8
Abengourou	9	10	10	13	9	11	10	8	8	6	7	9	9	9	9	11	11	10	10	10	9	10	11	7	9	9
Korhogo	13	14	14	14	14	14	14	11	11	10	10	10	11	11	10	13	12	12	11	11	12	12	13	12	10	10
JCAT	2	7	5	3	4	5	6	7	6	7	5	8	8	8	8	8	10	9	7	9	10	8	8	10	11	11
Denguélé	9	12	12	11	13	9	10	13	13	14	14	11	10	10	12	9	8	8	9	7	8	9	10	11	12	12
Bouaké	13	11	11	7	11	12	12	14	14	13	13	14	14	14	11	12	14	14	14	14	14	14	12	13	13	13
Stella	2	8	6	12	11	13	13	10	10	11	11	12	12	12	13	10	9	11	12	13	13	13	14	14	14	14

Updated to match(es) played on 16 August 2015. Source: Soccerway (in French)
