= 2018–19 Ligue 1 (Ivory Coast) =

Côte d'Ivoire Ligue 1
- Season: 2018–19

The 2018–19 Côte d'Ivoire Ligue 1 is the 60th season of the Côte d'Ivoire Ligue 1, the top-tier football league in the Ivory Coast (Côte d'Ivoire), since its establishment in 1960. The season started on 7 September 2018.

== League table ==
| Pos | Team | Pld | W | D | L | GF | GA | GD | Pts | Qualification or relegation |
|---|---|---|---|---|---|---|---|---|---|---|
| 1 | SO de l'Armée (C) | 26 | 16 | 4 | 6 | 38 | 24 | +14 | 52 | Qualification for Champions League |
| 2 | FC San Pédro (Q) | 26 | 14 | 8 | 4 | 35 | 19 | +16 | 50 | Qualification for Confederation Cup (Note: FC San Pédro are Coupe de Côte d'Ivoire winners.) |
| 3 | ASEC Mimosas | 26 | 11 | 7 | 8 | 34 | 25 | +9 | 40 | |
| 4 | Racing Club Abidjan | 26 | 11 | 6 | 9 | 33 | 27 | +6 | 39 | |
| 5 | Bouaké FC | 26 | 10 | 7 | 9 | 33 | 33 | 0 | 37 | |
| 6 | Africa Sports d'Abidjan | 26 | 9 | 8 | 9 | 23 | 31 | −8 | 35 | |
| 7 | Williamsville Athletic Club | 26 | 8 | 10 | 8 | 27 | 23 | +4 | 34 | |
| 8 | AS Indenié Abengourou | 26 | 8 | 10 | 8 | 26 | 25 | +1 | 34 | |
| 9 | AS Tanda | 26 | 9 | 7 | 10 | 25 | 26 | −1 | 34 | |
| 10 | Academie de Foot Amadou Diallo | 26 | 8 | 10 | 8 | 23 | 24 | −1 | 34 | |
| 11 | SC Gagnoa | 26 | 8 | 7 | 11 | 25 | 28 | −3 | 31 | |
| 12 | USC Bassam | 26 | 8 | 7 | 11 | 22 | 27 | −5 | 31 | |
| 13 | LYS Sassandra (R) | 26 | 6 | 5 | 15 | 25 | 34 | −9 | 23 | Relegation |
| 14 | Moossou FC (R) | 26 | 7 | 2 | 17 | 24 | 47 | −23 | 23 | Relegation |

Source: Soccerway
(C) Champions; (Q) Qualified for the phase indicated; (R) Relegated
