= Ivory Coast national under-23 football team =

Ivory Coast U-23
- Nickname: Les Éléphants (The Elephants)
- Association: Ivorian Football Federation
- Confederation: CAF (Africa)
First colours	Second colours

The Ivorian national under-23 football team represents Ivory Coast in international under-23 tournaments.

Nicknamed Les Petit Éléphants (The Small Elephants" in English), the under-23 national team's first appearance on the world stage was in 2003 at the 2003 FIFA World Youth Championship; they reached the Round of 16 before being ousted by the United States.

== Results and fixtures ==
Legend

Win Draw Lose Fixture

=== 2021 ===
22 July 2020 Summer Olympics GS Group D	Ivory Coast	2–1	Saudi Arabia	Yokohama, Japan
20:30 UTC+9	Al-Amri 39' (o.g.); Kessié 66'	Report	Al-Dawsari 44'	Stadium: International Stadium Yokohama; Referee: Matthew Conger (New Zealand)

25 July 2020 Summer Olympics GS Group D	Brazil	0–0	Ivory Coast	Yokohama, Japan
17:30 UTC+9		Report		Stadium: International Stadium Yokohama; Referee: Ismail Elfath (United States)

28 July 2020 Summer Olympics GS Group D	Germany	1–1	Ivory Coast	Rifu, Japan
17:00 UTC+9	Löwen 73'	Report	Henrichs 69' (o.g.)	Stadium: Miyagi Stadium; Referee: Leodán González (Uruguay)

31 July Olympics QF	Spain	5–2 (a.e.t.)	Ivory Coast	Rifu, Japan
	Olmo 30'; Mir 90+3', 117', 120+1'; Oyarzabal 98' (pen.)	Report	Bailly 10'; Gradel 90+1'	Stadium: Miyagi Stadium; Attendance: 0 Referee: Jesus Valenzuela (Venezuela)

=== 2023 ===
21 November Friendly	Iraq	0-4	Ivory Coast	San Pedro del Pinatar, Spain
			Mohamed Bamba 21'; Abdoulaye Traoré 25'; Bénie Traoré 30'; Moïse Sahi 86'	Stadium: Pinatar Arena

== Players ==
=== Current squad ===
The following players were named in the squad for the 2023 Maurice Revello Tournament held in France from 5 to 18 June 2023.

Caps and goals are correct as of 22 March 2023, after the match against Morocco.

No.	Pos.	Player	Date of birth (age)	Caps	Goals	Club
	GK	Mohamed Koné	7 March 2002 (age 24)	1	0	(French Football Federation) Le Havre
	GK	Kombo Kouassi	8 April 2004 (age 22)	0	0	(Ivorian Football Federation) FC San Pédro
	DF	Michel Diaz	23 July 2003 (age 23)	1	0	(French Football Federation) Nantes
	DF	Mohamed Ali Yabré	30 October 2004 (age 22)	1	0	(Ivorian Football Federation) SOA
	DF	Eroine Agnikoi		0	0	(Ivorian Football Federation) Stade d'Abidjan
	DF	Souleymane Assane		0	0	(Ivorian Football Federation) FC San Pédro
	DF	Kareen Samassi		0	0	(Ivorian Football Federation) SOA
	DF	Aboubacar Sylla	31 December 2003 (age 22)	0	0	(Royal Belgian Football Association) Oud-Heverlee Leuven
	DF	Luc Zogbe		0	0	(Ivorian Football Federation) LYS Sassandra
	MF	Jean N'Guessan	17 April 2003 (age 23)	1	0	(French Football Federation) Nîmes
	MF	Sidiki Camara	23 August 2002 (age 24)	0	0	(Swiss Football Association) Servette
	MF	Isaaé Cisse		0	0	(Ivorian Football Federation) SOA
	MF	Ibrahim Diabate		0	0	(Ivorian Football Federation) SOL FC
	MF	Arafat Doumbia	16 November 2004 (age 21)	0	0	(Ivorian Football Federation) SOA
	MF	Ibrahim Fofana	2 October 2003 (age 23)	0	0	(French Football Federation) Amiens
	MF	Abdramane Konaté	25 June 2006 (age 20)	0	0	(Ivorian Football Federation) FC San Pédro
	FW	David Datro Fofana	22 December 2002 (age 23)	1	0	(The Football Association) Chelsea
	FW	Fernand Gouré	12 April 2002 (age 24)	0	0	(Hungarian Football Federation) Újpest
	FW	N'Dri Koffi	9 March 2002 (age 24)	0	0	(French Football Federation) Le Mans
	FW	Yaya Sogodogo		0	0	(Ivorian Football Federation) SOA
	FW	Yassine Toure		0	0	(The Football Association) Leicester City

=== Recent call-ups ===
Pos.	Player	Date of birth (age)	Caps	Goals	Club	Latest call-up
GK	Issa Fofana	30 January 2004 (age 22)	0	0	(Sudan) Al-Hilal	v. Niger, 29 October 2022
GK	Franck Tolla	Unknown	0	0	(Ivory Coast) Bafing	v. Niger, 29 October 2022
DF	Souleymane Coulibaly	26 December 2001 (age 24)	0	0	(Ivory Coast) ASEC Mimosas	v. Niger, 29 October 2022
DF	Seniko Romeo Doua	Unknown	0	0	(Ivory Coast) SOA	v. Niger, 29 October 2022
DF	Vayanga Doumbia	Unknown	0	0	(Ivory Coast) Stade d'Abidjan	v. Niger, 29 October 2022
DF	Dimitri Legbo	30 August 2001 (age 25)	0	0	(Finland) Inter Turku	v. Niger, 29 October 2022
DF	Landry Zouzou	Unknown	0	0	(Ivory Coast) AFAD Djékanou	v. Niger, 29 October 2022
MF	Arthur Bada	Unknown	0	0	(Ivory Coast) ASEC Mimosas	v. Niger, 29 October 2022
MF	Dieudonné Gaucho Debohi	15 January 2001 (age 25)	0	0	(France) Stade Malherbe Caen	v. Niger, 29 October 2022
MF	Abdoulaye Djiré	Unknown	0	0	(Ivory Coast) RC Abidjan	v. Niger, 29 October 2022
MF	Alpha Sidibé	3 November 2004 (age 22)	0	0	(Ivory Coast) San Pédro	v. Niger, 29 October 2022
MF	Mohamed Zoungrana	Unknown	0	0	(Ivory Coast) ASEC Mimosas	v. Niger, 29 October 2022
FW	Koro Coulibaly	Unknown	0	0	(Ivory Coast) SOL FC d'Abobo	v. Niger, 29 October 2022
FW	Sinare Thiago Karamoko	Unknown	0	0	(Ivory Coast) Bafing	v. Niger, 29 October 2022
FW	Sankara Karamoko	9 November 2003 (age 23)	0	0	(Ivory Coast) ASEC Mimosas	v. Niger, 29 October 2022
FW	Ben Guel Kouyate	Unknown	0	0	(Ivory Coast) Stade d'Abidjan	v. Niger, 29 October 2022
FW	Abdoulaye Sanogo	Unknown	0	0	(Ivory Coast) SOL FC d'Abobo	v. Niger, 29 October 2022
FW	Yacabo Valentin Serebe	Unknown	0	0	(Ivory Coast) Zoman FC	v. Niger, 29 October 2022
FW	Seydou Traoré	Unknown	0	0	(Ivory Coast) RC Abidjan	v. Niger, 29 October 2022

== Honours ==
- 2010 Toulon Tournament (first title)

== Competitive record ==
=== 2010 Toulon Tournament ===
The Toulon Tournament (officially the Tournoi Espoirs de Toulon or "Toulon Hopefuls' Tournament")is a football tournament which traditionally features invited national teams composed of under-21 players.

This was only Ivory Coast's 2nd appearance and they still performed well. The results are below.

==== Group stage group A ====
Team	Pld	W	D	L	GF	GA	GD	Pts
France	3	3	0	0	8	2	+6	9
Ivory Coast	3	2	0	1	6	2	+4	6
Colombia	3	1	0	2	3	4	–1	3
Japan	3	0	0	3	1	10	–9	0

All times local (CEST)

2010-05-18
18:30 CEST

Ivory Coast	3 – 0	Japan
Boli 2'; Déblé 26' (pen.); Sagbo 65'	Report

Stade du Ray, Nice
Referee: Thomas Vejlgaard (Denmark)

2010-05-18
20:45 CEST

France	2 – 0	Colombia
Schneiderlin 33'; Kitambala 44'	Report

Stade du Ray, Nice
Referee: Maksim Layushkin (Russia)

2010-05-20
18:00 CEST

Colombia	0 – 2	Ivory Coast
	Report	Goua Gohou 62', 66'

Stade Perruc, Hyères
Referee: Khamis Al-Mari (Qatar)

2010-05-20
20:00 CEST

France	4 – 1	Japan
Bourgeois 6'; Gueye 33' (pen.); Butin 70'; Brahimi 72'	Report	Suganuma 17'

Stade Perruc, Hyères
Referee: Jorge Osorio Reyes (Chile)

2010-05-22
19:00 CEST

Japan	0 – 3	Colombia
	Report	Calle 13'; Cardona 33'; Muriel 35'

Le Grand Stade, Le Lavandou
Referee: Thomas Vejlgaard (Denmark)

2010-05-22
19:00 CEST

Ivory Coast	1 – 2	France
Saré 54'	Report	Nestor 46'; Dossevi 60'

Stade de Lattre, Aubagne
Referee: Jorge Osorio Reyes (Chile)

==== Semifinals ====
May 25, 2010
18:30 CEST

Chile	0 – 2	Ivory Coast
	Report	Sagbo 65'; Déblé 80+3'

Stade Mayol, Toulon
Referee: Maksim Layushkin (Russia)

May 25, 2010
21:00 CEST

France	2 – 3	Denmark
Butin 29'; Kitambala 68'	Report	Koné 24' (o.g.); Bille 48', 73'

Stade Mayol, Toulon
Referee: Abdel Ismail (Jordan)

==== Final ====
May 27, 2010
21:00 CEST

Ivory Coast	3 – 2	Denmark
Ouedraogo 19'; Gohou 39'; Sio 74'	Report	Nielsen 46'; Mortensen 80'

Stade Mayol, Toulon
Referee: Jorge Osorio Reyes (Chile)

=== 2008 Summer Olympics ===
Ivory Coast- qualified for the 2008 Olympics. This African team representing Africa at the 2006 FIFA World Championships in Germany. It is one of the best teams in Africa. "We are one of the few African countries to have an organized youth league. Great players have always come out of the Ivory Coast; I'm thinking of Laurent Pokou in the 1970s; and Youssou Fofana in the 1980s. But now the footballing infrastructure is much better and so many youngsters are getting the right coaching", said Henri Michel (former coach of the Côte d'Ivoire national soccer team). Ivory Coast won the African Cup of Nations in 1992. Ivory Coast went far in the 2008 Olympics but stumbled at the last hurdle by losing to Nigeria 2-0 in quarter finals.

==== Group stage group A ====
Team	Pld	W	D	L	GF	GA	GD	Pts
Argentina	3	3	0	0	5	1	+4	9
Ivory Coast	3	2	0	1	6	4	+2	6
Australia	3	0	1	2	1	3	−2	1
Serbia	3	0	1	2	3	7	−4	1

2008-08-07
19:45

Ivory Coast	1 – 2	Argentina
Cissé 53'	(Report)	Messi 43'; Acosta 86'

Shanghai Stadium, Shanghai
Attendance: 43,266
Referee: Wolfgang Stark (Germany)

2008-08-10
19:45

Serbia	2 – 4	Ivory Coast
Mrdaković 16'; Rakić 90'	(Report)	Cissé 3'; Rajković 24' (o.g.); Kalou 70'; Gervinho 90+3'

Shanghai Stadium, Shanghai
Attendance: 38,320
Referee: Roberto Moreno Salazar (Panama)

2008-08-13
19:45

Ivory Coast	1 – 0	Australia
Kalou 81'	(Report)

Tianjin Olympic Center Stadium, Tianjin
Attendance: 50,437
Referee: Jair Marrufo (United States)

==== Quarterfinals ====
2008-08-16
21:00

Nigeria	2 – 0	Ivory Coast
Odemwingie 44'; Obinna 82' (pen.)	(Report)

Qinhuangdao Olympic Sports Center Stadium, Qinhuangdao
Attendance: 28,944
Referee: Masoud Moradi (Iran)

== See also ==
- Sport in Ivory Coast
  - Football in Ivory Coast
    - Women's football in Ivory Coast
- Ivory Coast national football team
- Ivory Coast national under-20 football team
- Ivory Coast national under-17 football team
- Ivory Coast women's national football team
