= Charles Folly Ayayi =

Ivorian footballer (born 1990)

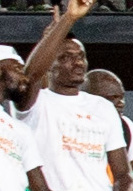
- Ayayi in 2024

Personal information
- Date of birth: December 29, 1990 (age 35)
- Place of birth: Togo
- Height: 1.90 m (6 ft 3 in)
- Position: Goalkeeper

Team information
- Current team: ASEC Mimosas
- Number: 21

Senior career*
Years	Team	Apps	(Gls)
2015–2019	Gagnoa		
2019–2022	RC Abidjan		
2022–	ASEC Mimosas		

International career
2022–	Ivory Coast	8	(0)
Medal record
Representing Ivory Coast
Men's football
Africa Cup of Nations
Winner	2023 Ivory Coast
- * Club domestic league appearances and goals

Charles Folly Ayayi (born 29 December 1990) is a professional footballer who plays as a goalkeeper for ASEC Mimosas. Born in Togo, he plays for the Ivory Coast national team.

== Career ==
Folly Ayayi began his senior career in the Ivorian Ligue 1 in 2015. He moved to RC Abidjan in 2019 and helped them win the 2019–20 Ivorian Ligue 1. On 7 July 2022 he moved to ASEC Mimosas, and in his first season there won the 2022–23 Ivorian Ligue 1 and the 2023 Coupe de Côte d'Ivoire.

== International ==
Born in Togo, Folly Ayayi moved to the Ivory Coast at a young age and is a dual citizen. He debuted with the senior Ivory Coast national team at the 2022 African Nations Championship. He was part of the final squad that went on to win 2023 Africa Cup of Nations.

== Honours ==
RC Abidjan

- Ligue 1 (Ivory Coast): 2019–20
- Taça de Moçambique: 2023

ASEC Mimosas

- Ligue 1 (Ivory Coast): 2022–23
- Coupe de Côte d'Ivoire: 2023

Ivory Coast

- Africa Cup of Nations: 2023
