= Ivorian football league system =

Ivorian football league system data

- Country: Ivory Coast
- Sport: Association football
- Promotion and relegation: Yes

National system
- Federation: Ivorian Football Federation
- Confederation: Confederation of African Football
- Top division: Ligue 1
- Second division: Ligue 2
- Cup competition: Ivory Coast Cup; Houphouët-Boigny Cup

The Ivorian football league system chronicles the tabulated info regarding the football league available in Ivory Coast.

== Men ==
=== National Leagues ===
Level	League(s)/Division(s)			
1	Ligue 1; 14 clubs			
2	Ligue 2 Poule A 12 clubs		Ligue 2 Poule B 12 clubs	
3	Championnat D3 Poule A 10 clubs	Championnat D3 Poule B 10 clubs	Championnat D3 Poule C 9 clubs	Championnat D3 Poule D 9 clubs

=== Regional Leagues ===
Leagues	Level IV	Level V
Abengourou	Ligue d'Abengourou
North Abidjan	Ligue d'Abidjan nord 1	Ligue d'Abidjan nord 2
South Abidjan	Ligue d'Abidjan sud 1	Ligue d'Abidjan sud 2
Bouaké	Ligue de Bouaké 1	Ligue de Bouaké 2
Bondoukou	Ligue de Bondoukou 1	Ligue de Bondoukou 2
Daloa	Ligue de Daloa 1	Ligue de Daloa 2
Man	Ligue de Man 1	Ligue de Man 2
San-Pédro	Ligue de San-Pédro 1	Ligue de San-Pédro 2
Yamoussoukro	Ligue de Yamoussoukro
