= Christ Tapé =

Ivorian footballer (born 2006)

Personal information
- Date of birth: 2 March 2006 (age 20)
- Place of birth: Séguéla, Ivory Coast
- Height: 1.88 m (6 ft 2 in)
- Positions: Left-back; centre-back

Team information
- Current team: Toulouse
- Number: 12

Youth career
- Académie Silué FC (Abengourou)

Senior career*
| Years | Team | Apps | (Gls) |
| –2024 | Korhogo | 1 | (1) |
| 2024–2026 | Horsens | 53 | (1) |
| 2026– | Toulouse | 4 | (1) |

International career^{‡}
- Ivory Coast U20
- Ivory Coast U23
| 2026– | Ivory Coast | 1 | (0) |
- * Club domestic league appearances and goals as of 12 September 2026 ‡ National team caps and goals as of 3 October 2026

Christ Tapé (born 2 March 2006) is an Ivorian professional footballer who plays as a left-back or centre-back for Ligue 1 club Toulouse and the Ivory Coast national team.

== Club career ==
Tapé began his career at Académie Silué FC in Abengourou before joining Korhogo. In July 2024, he moved to Danish club Horsens, and helped them win promotion to the Danish Superliga in the 2025–26 season.

On 9 July 2026, Tapé signed for Ligue 1 club Toulouse on a four-year contract. A transfer fee of €2.5 million was reported by L'Équipe. He made his debut on 22 August in a 2–0 defeat to Lyon, and scored his first goal for the club a week later in a 2–2 draw at Brest.

== International career ==
Tapé has represented Ivory Coast at under-20 and under-23 level. He was part of the under-23 squad that finished third at the 2026 Maurice Revello Tournament.

On 3 October 2026, Tapé made his debut for the Ivory Coast national team in a friendly against Cameroon.
