= Aké Loba (footballer) =

Ivorian footballer

Personal information
- Full name: Aké Arnaud Loba
- Date of birth: 1 April 1998 (age 28)
- Place of birth: Divo, Ivory Coast
- Height: 1.79 m (5 ft 10 in)
- Position: Forward

Team information
- Current team: East Bengal

Youth career
- 2015: AS d'Abobo
- 2015–2016: SOA

Senior career*
Years	Team	Apps	(Gls)
2016–2017	SOA	25	(7)
2018–2020	Universidad San Martín	32	(18)
2019	→ Querétaro (loan)	36	(9)
2020–2021	Monterrey	21	(6)
2021–2023	Nashville	40	(2)
2023	→ Mazatlán (loan)	12	(2)
2023–2024	Mazatlán	14	(9)
2024–2025	Tijuana	3	(0)
2025	→ Querétaro (loan)	5	(0)
2025–2026	Al-Shomooa	8	(2)
2026–	East Bengal	9	(5)

International career
2017	Ivory Coast U20	4	(1)
- * Club domestic league appearances and goals as of 15 July 2023

Aké Arnaud Loba (born 1 April 1998) is an Ivorian professional footballer who plays as a forward for Indian Super League club East Bengal.

== Club career ==
Born in Divo, Loba joined SOA's youth setup in 2015, from Association Sportive des Enseignants d’Abobo. He made his debut for the former during the 2016–17 campaign, being also named in the Team of the Year.

On 30 December 2017, Loba signed for Peruvian Primera División side Universidad San Martín. He made his professional debut the following 4 February, starting in a 4–0 home routing of Ayacucho FC.

Loba scored his first professional goal on 11 February 2018, netting his team's second in a 2–1 away win against Comerciantes Unidos. He finished the season with 18 goals, being also named the Player of the Season, but losing it to Gabriel Costa.

On 23 December 2018, Loba joined Liga MX side Querétaro on a one-year loan deal.

On 14 January 2020, Loba joined Mexican club Monterrey on a permanent deal.

On 7 July 2021, Loba transferred to Nashville SC of Major League Soccer as a designated player. The deal was for a reported $6.8 million, a club-record transfer fee.

== Honours ==
Monterrey

- Copa MX: 2019–20
- CONCACAF Champions League: 2021
