= RC Koumassi =

- Full name: Racing Club de Koumassi
- Founded: 1992
- Ground: Complexe Sportif de Koumassi
- League: Côte d'Ivoire Second Division
- 2009: 9th Place

The Racing Club de Koumassi (RC Koumassi) is an Ivorian football club based in Koumassi. In the 2025-26 season, RC Koumassi played in Poule A of Division 3 in the Ivorian football pyramid.

== Current squad ==
As of July 2009 Note: Flags indicate national team as defined under FIFA eligibility rules; some limited exceptions apply. Players may hold more than one non-FIFA nationality.

No.	Pos.	Nation	Player
—	GK	CIV	Kouamé Jean-Jacques Djaha
—	GK	CIV	Yapo Xavier Atsé
—	GK	CIV	Yao Wilson M'Bra
—	GK	CIV	Moussa Cissé
—	DF	CIV	Yaya Sylla
—	DF	CIV	Kader Diomandé
—	DF	CIV	Kanga Yannick Amani
—	DF	BFA	Abdoul Moubarak Songne
—	DF	CIV	Aboubakar Sinanta
—	DF	CIV	Franckie Ayépo
—	MF	CIV	Brice Martial Kouakou
—	MF	CIV	Laurent N'Guessan
—	MF	CIV	Irié Bi Irié
—	MF	CIV	Abdul Razack Zeba
—	MF	BFA	Kabeya Lamine Yéo

No.	Pos.	Nation	Player
—	MF	CIV	Aboubakar Diarrassouba
—	MF	CIV	Aboubakary Nassamou
—	MF	CIV	Anicet Eden Atchori
—	MF	CIV	Assiénin Germain Kouadio
—	MF	CIV	Léonce Claver Gohi Bi Nen
—	MF	CIV	Moustapha Diaby
—	MF	CIV	Ogou Edmond Akichi
—	MF	BFA	Aboudou Razac Kéré
—	MF	CIV	Amadou Ouattara
—	FW	BFA	Abdoulaye Yaméogo
—	FW	CIV	Koffi Serge Kouakou
—	FW	CIV	Cyrille Abraham Kouko
—	FW	CIV	Edgar Daleba
—	FW	CIV	Herman Kouao
—	FW	CIV	Adjico Mohamed Metchess
