= Daniel Yeboah =

Ivorian footballer (born 1984)

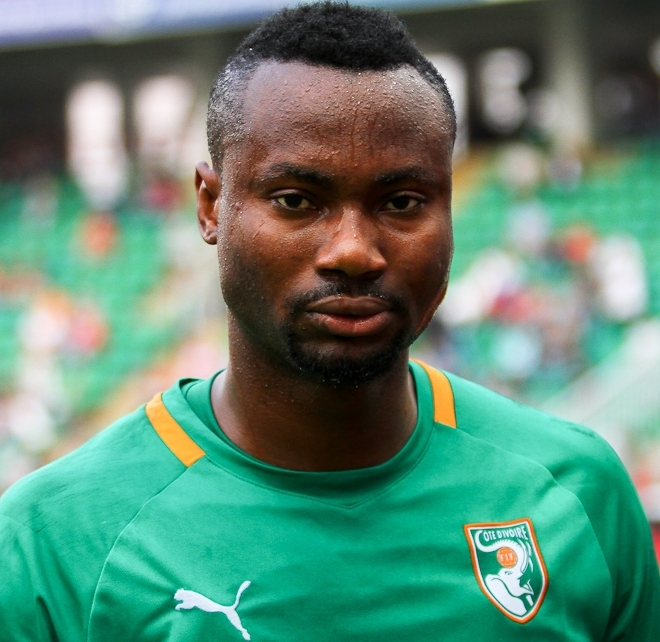
- Yeboah with the Ivory Coast in 2012

Personal information
- Full name: Daniel Yéboah Tétchi
- Date of birth: 13 November 1984 (age 41)
- Place of birth: Dabou, Ivory Coast
- Height: 1.87 m (6 ft 2 in)
- Position: Goalkeeper

Senior career*
Years	Team	Apps	(Gls)
2000–2005	Bastia B	45	(0)
2004–2005	→ Villemomble Sports (loan)	31	(0)
2005–2006	Villemomble Sports	20	(0)
2006–2007	→ US Créteil (loan)	7	(0)
2007–2008	Villemomble Sports	8	(0)
2008–2012	ASEC Mimosas		
2012–2014	Dijon II	2	(0)
2016	KSV Oostkamp		
2016–2017	Azam		
2019	ISCA		
2019–2020	Williamsville AC		

International career
2003	Côte d'Ivoire U21	3	(0)
2003–2013	Ivory Coast	13	(0)
- * Club domestic league appearances and goals

Daniel Yéboah Tétchi (born 13 November 1984) is an Ivorian former professional footballer who played as a goalkeeper.

== Club career ==
Yeboah was ASEC's second choice goalkeeper, until 2009.

In January 2019, he joined Ivorian third-tier side l’Inova Sporting Club Association. On 24 September 2019, he then joined Williamsville AC.

== International career ==
Yeboah was part of the Ivory Coast U20 national team on the 2003 FIFA World Youth Championship in United Arab Emirates.

He was the first domestic based player to be picked for an Ivory Coast World Cup squad in 2010.
