= Patrick Ouotro =

Ivorian footballer (born 2005)

Personal information
- Full name: Vignon Mathieu Patrick Ouotro
- Date of birth: 13 September 2005 (age 21)
- Place of birth: Toulépleu, Ivory Coast
- Height: 1.82 m (6 ft 0 in)
- Position: Forward

Team information
- Current team: Vitória de Guimarães

Youth career
- ASEC Mimosas
- –2022: LYS Sassandra

Senior career*
Years	Team	Apps	(Gls)
2022–2024	LYS Sassandra		
2024	Strasbourg B	10	(2)
2024–2025	Strasbourg	1	(0)
2024–2025	→ Martigues (loan)	13	(0)
2025	→ Seraing (loan)	8	(2)
2025–2026	Nancy	20	(2)
2026–	Vitória de Guimarães	0	(0)

International career^{‡}
2024–	Ivory Coast U20	4	(4)
2023	Ivory Coast A'	4	(1)
- * Club domestic league appearances and goals as of 12 May 2026 ‡ National team caps and goals as of 22:41, 1 January 2025 (UTC)

Vignon Mathieu Patrick Ouotro (born 13 September 2005), known as Patrick Ouotro, is an Ivorian professional footballer who plays as a forward for Portuguese Primeira Liga club Vitória de Guimarães.

== Club career ==
Ouotro made his Ivorian Ligue 1 debuts with LYS Sassandra in the 2022–23 season. At the age of 17, he finished as the joint-fourth top scorer with nine goals, and was described as the "revelation" of the league. He was elected Player of the Month in November 2022 and Young Player of the Season at the end of the campaign.

On 12 January 2024, Ouotro signed for French Ligue 1 club Strasbourg until June 2028, initially joining the club's academy. After playing for the reserves, he was called up for a first team training session for the first time in March 2024. On 19 May 2024, Ouotro made his Ligue 1 debut as a substitute in a match against Lyon. On 15 August 2024, he was loaned out to Ligue 2 club Martigues for the 2024–25 season. The loan was terminated in early January 2025.

On 3 February 2025, Ouotro moved on a new loan to Seraing in Belgian second-tier Challenger Pro League. On 16 July 2025, he signed for newly promoted Ligue 2 club Nancy on a four-year contract.

On 28 July 2026, Ouotro joined Vitória de Guimarães in the Portuguese top tier and signed a four-year contract.

== International career ==
Ouotro participated in the 2022 African Nations Championship, scoring one goal in four appearances as Ivory Coast was knocked out in the quarter-finals. At the 2024 Maurice Revello Tournament, Ouotro led the Ivory Coast U20s to second place, contributing four goals including two in the final against the Ukraine U23s. He earned the distinctions of final MVP, third best player in the competition, and a spot in the team of the tournament.

== Career statistics ==
=== Club ===
As of 1 July 2025

Appearances and goals by club, season and competition
Club	Season	League			National cup		Other		Total	
Club	Season	Division	Apps	Goals	Apps	Goals	Apps	Goals	Apps	Goals
Strasbourg B	2023–24	Championnat National 3	10	2	—		—		10	2
Strasbourg	2023–24	Ligue 1	1	0	0	0	—		1	0
Martigues (loan)	2024–25	Ligue 2	13	0	2	1	—		15	1
Seraing (loan)	2024–25	Challenger Pro League	8	2	—		—		8	2
Career total			32	4	2	1	0	0	34	5

=== International ===
As of match played 17 January 2023

Appearances and goals by national team and year
National team	Year	Apps	Goals
Ivory Coast	2023	4	1
Total		4	1

Scores and results list Ivory Coast's goal tally first, score column indicates score after each Ouotro goal.

List of international goals scored by Patrick Ouotro
No.	Date	Venue	Opponent	Score	Result	Competition	Ref.
1	22 January 2023	Nelson Mandela Stadium, Algiers, Algeria	Uganda	2–0	3–1	2022 African Nations Championship	

== Honours ==
Ivory Coast U20

- Maurice Revello Tournament runner-up: 2024

Individual

- Ligue 1 (Ivory Coast) Player of the Month: November 2022
- Ligue 1 (Ivory Coast) Young Player of the Season: 2022–23
- Maurice Revello Tournament Third Best Player: 2024
- Maurice Revello Tournament Team of the Tournament: 2024
