= Championnat Division 3 =

Football league in Côte d'Ivoire

Championnat D3
- Country: Côte d'Ivoire
- Confederation: CAF
- Number of clubs: 38
- Level on pyramid: 3
- Promotion to: Ligue 2
- Relegation to: Division Régionale
- Domestic cup: Coupe de Côte d'Ivoire de football
- Website: Fédération Ivoirienne de Football
- Current: 2025-26 Championnat Division 3

The Côte d'Ivoire Championnat D3 is the third tier of Ivoirian Football.

The following 38 clubs will compete in the Championnat Division 3 during the 2012-13 season.

== Members for 2012–13 ==
=== Poule A ===
Club	City
Alliance Ind.	Abengourou
ASC Cocody	Cocody, Abidjan
Atlantis FC	Yopougon
ES Abobo	Abobo, Abidjan
Juventus	Alépé
RC Adiaké	Adiaké
Sacraboutou	Bondoukou
Satellite FC du Plateau Abidjan	Bondoukou
US Koumassi	Koumassi, Abidjan
Yopougon FC	Yopougon

=== Poule B ===
Club	City
Agneby	Agboville
Espoir	Koumassi, Abidjan
Genesa FC	Abidjan
Mala Sport	Yezimala
RFC Yakro	Yamoussoukro
Santa Cruz	Kossihouen
Selafe FC	Treichville, Abidjan
Sol FC	Abobo, Abidjan
UC Niablé	Niablé
WAC	Grand-Bassam

=== Poule C ===
Club	City
AS Daoukro	Daoukro
AS Divo	Divo
Esperance	Bouaké
Kocoumbo FC	Kocoumbo
N'Zi FC	Dimbokro
Siguilolo FC	Toumodi
Sikensi FC	Sikensi
Sol FC	Abobo, Abidjan
Taabo	Taabo

=== Poule D ===
Club	City
AC Sinfra	Sinfra
Gballet Sport	Buyo
Guerry FC	Gagnoa
JAC	Zuénoula
Man FC	Man
Nicla	Guiglo
Réveil	Daloa
US Diégonéfla	Diégonéfla
Zika FC	Gadouan
