= Vigori Gbe =

Ivorian footballer

Personal information
- Full name: Vigori Jean-Jaurès Gbe
- Date of birth: 20 February 2002 (age 24)
- Place of birth: Man, Ivory Coast
- Height: 1.70 m (5 ft 7 in)
- Position: Right-back

Team information
- Current team: ISCA

Youth career
- –2018: Williamsville

Senior career*
Years	Team	Apps	(Gls)
2018–2021	Williamsville		
2021	Ilves	16	(0)
2021	Ilves/2	1	(0)
2021–2023	FC Haka	1	(0)
2024–	ICSA		

International career
2020–	Ivory Coast U23		
- * Club domestic league appearances and goals as of 19 April 2023

Vigori Jean-Jaurès Gbe (born 20 February 2002) is an Ivorian professional footballer who plays as a right-back for ISCA.

== Club career ==
Gbe started his career playing for Williamsville and featured for them in the 2018 CAF Confederation Cup. In February 2021, he signed for Veikkausliiga club Ilves on a one-year deal, with the option of an additional year. Later that month, he made his debut, coming on as a substitute in a 2–1 loss to Oulu in the Suomen Cup. On 4 January 2022, Gbe joined fellow Veikkausliiga club FC Haka on a one-year deal with an option to extend by a further year.

== International career ==
Gbe has represented Ivory Coast at under-23 level.

== Personal life ==
Gbe was born in Man, Ivory Coast and started playing football at the age of 8. His favorite player is Dani Carvajal.
