= Dia Wah Michael =

Association football player (born 2000)

Personal information
- Date of birth: 7 February 2000 (age 26)
- Place of birth: Dimbokro, Ivory Coast
- Height: 5 ft 8 in (1.73 m)
- Position: Left-back

Youth career
- 2020–2021: Séraphins FC

Senior career*
Years	Team	Apps	(Gls)
2022–2023	Stade d'Abidjan	46	(5)
2023–2024	LYS Sassandra	30	(6)
2024–2026	Al-Merrikh SC	35	(1)
Total		111	(12)

International career
2025–	Chad	5	(0)
- * Club domestic league appearances and goals

Dia Wah Michael (born 7 February 2000) is a professional footballer who last played as a left-back for Sudanese club Al-Merrikh SC. Born in Ivory Coast, he represents the Chad national team.

== Club career ==
Michael began his career at Séraphins FC during the 2020–21 season.

=== Stade d'Abidjan ===
In 2021–22, Michael made his professional debut with Stade d'Abidjan in Ivorian Premier Division.

=== LYS Sassandra ===
On 7 January 2023, Michael joined Ivorian Premier Division club LYS Sassandra on a two-year contract.

=== Al-Merrikh SC ===
On 13 June 2024, he joined Sudanese club Al-Merrikh SC on a one-year contract with an option for another season.

== International career ==
Born in Ivory Coast to Ivorian and Chad parents, Michael switched to the Chad national team. He debuted with the Chad national team in a 1–1 2026 FIFA World Cup qualification tie with Ghana on 4 September 2025.
