= Thierry Kassi =

Ivorian footballer

Personal information
- Full name: Kouakou Thierry Mathias Kassi
- Date of birth: 1 March 2000 (age 26)
- Height: 1.80 m (5 ft 11 in)
- Position: Forward

Team information
- Current team: ASEC Mimosas
- Number: 27

Senior career*
Years	Team	Apps	(Gls)
2016–2017	AFAD Djékanou		
2017–2018	AS Tanda		
2018–2019	SC Gagnoa		
2019–2020	Issia Wazi FC		
2020–2022	Olympique Safi		
2022–	ASEC Mimosas		

International career^{‡}
2017–	Ivory Coast	1	(0)
- * Club domestic league appearances and goals as of 11:44, 1 March 2019 (UTC) ‡ National team caps and goals as of 11:44, 1 March 2019 (UTC)

Kouakou Thierry Mathias Kassi (born 1 March 2000) is an Ivorian professional footballer who plays as a forward for ASEC Mimosas.

== Career statistics ==
=== International ===
National team	Year	Apps	Goals
Ivory Coast	2017	1	0
