= Tiécoura Coulibaly =

Ivorian footballer

Personal information
- Date of birth: May 4, 1988 (age 38)
- Place of birth: Anyama, Ivory Coast
- Height: 1.74 m (5 ft 9 in)
- Position: Defender

Team information
- Current team: SC Gagnoa

Senior career*
Years	Team	Apps	(Gls)
2006	ASEC Mimosas		
2007–2014	Stella Club d'Adjamé		
2014–2017	SC Gagnoa		
2017–2018	AS Tanda		
2018–	SC Gagnoa		

International career
2013	Ivory Coast	2	(1)
- * Club domestic league appearances and goals

Tiécoura Coulibaly (born 4 May 1988) is an Ivorian football defender who currently plays for SC Gagnoa.
