= Aristide Bancé =

Burkinabé footballer (born 1984)

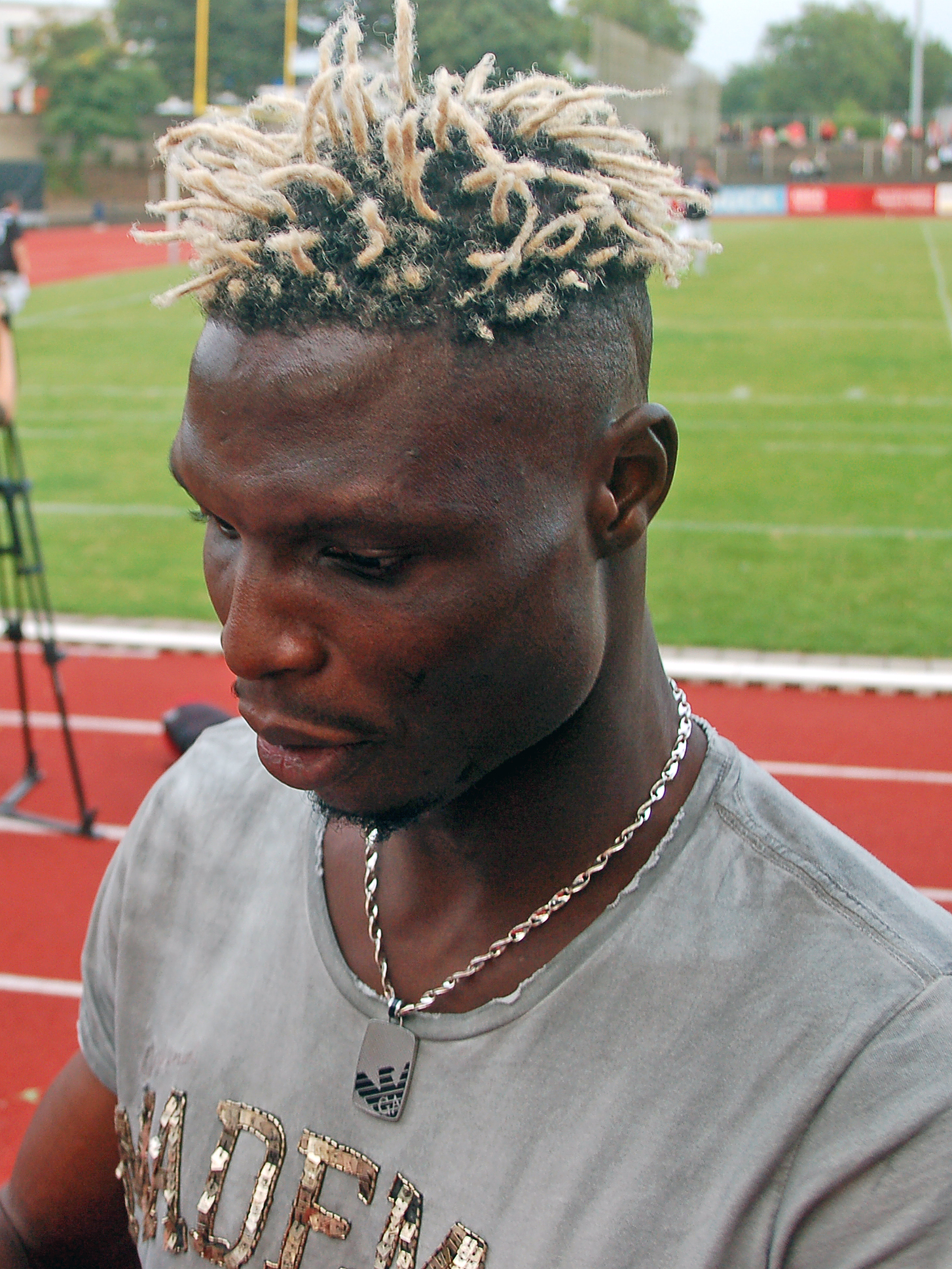
- Bancé in 2013

Personal information
- Full name: Aristide Bancé
- Date of birth: 19 September 1984 (age 42)
- Place of birth: Abidjan, Ivory Coast
- Height: 1.93 m (6 ft 4 in)
- Position: Striker

Youth career
- –2000: Stade d'Abidjan

Senior career*
Years	Team	Apps	(Gls)
2000	Stade d'Abidjan	33	(8)
2001	Athlétic Adjamé	30	(5)
2002	RFC Daoukro	20	(8)
2002–2003	Santos Burkina	16	(9)
2003–2006	Lokeren	77	(27)
2006–2008	Metalurh Donetsk	12	(2)
2007–2008	→ Germinal Beerschot (loan)	9	(0)
2008	→ Kickers Offenbach (loan)	10	(4)
2008–2010	Mainz 05	62	(24)
2010–2012	Al-Ahli Dubai	7	(2)
2011	→ Umm-Salal (loan)	8	(4)
2011	→ Samsunspor (loan)	20	(5)
2012–2014	FC Augsburg	21	(1)
2013–2014	→ Fortuna Düsseldorf (loan)	16	(2)
2014	HJK Helsinki	4	(1)
2015	Irtysh Pavlodar	11	(2)
2015–2016	Chippa United	14	(3)
2016	Riga	8	(1)
2016–2017	ASEC Mimosas	22	(13)
2017–2018	Al-Masry	24	(8)
2019	US des Forces Armées	0	(0)
2019–2020	Horoya AC	11	(5)

International career^{‡}
2003–2019	Burkina Faso	79	(24)
Medal record
Men's Football
Representing Burkina Faso
Africa Cup of Nations
Runner-up	2013 South Africa
Third place	2017 Gabon
- * Club domestic league appearances and goals as of 7 February 2019 ‡ National team caps and goals as of 18:53, 14 November 2021 (UTC)

Aristide Bancé (born 19 September 1984) is a Burkinabé former professional footballer who played as a striker.

He started his European career at Lokeren, scoring 27 goals in 87 Jupiler Pro League games. After a season in Ukraine with Metalurh Donetsk, he moved to German club Mainz 05. In his first season at Mainz he helped the club achieve promotion to the Bundesliga with 14 league goals, as well as the semi-finals of the DFB-Pokal, scoring 4 goals in the latter competition. The next season, under Thomas Tuchel, he helped Mainz staying in the German top tier and achieve 9th place by scoring 10 goals in the 2009–10 Bundesliga.

In 2013, Bancé helped his national team to reach the final of the 2013 Africa Cup of Nations, Burkina Faso's greatest achievement in football to date. He scored both the equaliser and the winning kick in the eventual penalty shootout in the semi-final against Ghana. In the 2017 Africa Cup of Nations, he scored the first goal in Burkina Faso's win over Tunisia in the quarter-finals, and in the semi-final scored a late equaliser against Egypt to take the game to a penalty shootout. Burkina Faso lost the shootout and eventually finished third overall in the cup by defeating Ghana in the third place play-off.

== Club career ==
=== Metalurh Donetsk ===
On 20 June 2006, Bancé signed for Metalurh Donetsk on a four-year contract.

Having failed to secure a first-team place at Metalurh Donetsk, he returned to Belgium in July 2007, signing for Germinal Beerschot on a year-long loan. However, he was loaned out to Kickers Offenbach in January 2008 for the remainder of the season.

=== Mainz 05 ===
Bancé joined Mainz 05 on a four-year contract for an undisclosed fee in summer 2008.

=== Al-Ahli Dubai ===
On 16 August 2010, Bancé signed for Al-Ahli Dubai on a four-year contract, with the transfer agreement between the two clubs remaining undisclosed.

=== FC Augsburg ===
In June 2012, Bancé signed for FC Augsburg on a three-year contract for an undisclosed fee.

In September 2013, he joined Fortuna Düsseldorf on loan until the end of the season.

=== HJK Helsinki ===
In September 2014, Bancé signed with Finnish Veikkausliiga side HJK Helsinki.

=== Irtysh Pavlodar ===
In February 2015, Bancé signed for Kazakhstan Premier League side FC Irtysh Pavlodar, leaving the club in June of the same year.

=== Chippa United ===
In August 2015, Bancé went on trial with Bidvest Wits of the South African Premier Soccer League, eventually signing with Chippa United later in the month. Bancé parted company with Chippa United in May 2016.

=== Riga ===
In August 2016, Bancé signed with Virslīga side Riga FC.

=== ASEC Mimosas ===
In November 2016, Bancé was confirmed as a new signing for Ivorian side ASEC Mimosas. Bancé was voted player of the month for November 2016.

=== Al-Masry ===
In July 2017, Bancé signed a two-year contract with Egyptian Premier League side Al-Masry.

=== US des Forces Armées ===
In February 2019, Bancé returned to Burkina Faso to sign for US des Forces Armées.

=== Horoya AC ===
In May 2019, Bancé signed for Guinean club Horoya AC, his 22nd team. In October 2019 he scored a hate-trick in the Confederation Cup play-offs.

== International career ==
Bancé is a member of the Burkina Faso national football team. He has appeared for Burkina Faso at three Africa Cup of Nations tournaments, scoring both the team's goal and the winning kick in the penalty shootout in Les Étalons' semi-final defeat of Ghana at the 2013 edition to put the nation in the final for first time in its history. Burkina Faso went on to lose the final to Nigeria and finish as runner-up.

At the 2015 Africa Cup of Nations, Bancé scored Burkina Faso's goal in a 2–1 loss to Congo which saw the 2013 runner-up knocked out at the group stage. In 2017, he scored a crucial goal in his team's quarter-final against Tunisia and in the semi-final scored a late equaliser against Egypt to take the game to a penalty shootout. Burkina Faso lost the shootout and eventually finished third overall in the cup, defeating Ghana in the third-place playoff.

In July 2020, Bancé announced his retirement from international football.

== Personal life ==
Bancé was born in Abidjan, Ivory Coast to Burkinabe parents, but moved to Burkina Faso as a child. He is the brother-in-law to professional footballer Aruna Dindane.

== Career statistics ==
=== International ===
As of match played 17 November 2019

Burkina Faso
Year	Apps	Goals
2003	1	0
2004	0	0
2005	2	0
2006	2	0
2007	2	0
2008	1	1
2009	5	1
2010	3	0
2011	5	2
2012	5	1
2013	13	5
2014	6	1
2015	11	6
2016	4	0
2017	11	4
2018	2	1
2019	6	2
Total	79	24

=== International goals ===
Scores and results list Burkina Faso's goal tally first.

No	Date	Venue	Opponent	Score	Result	Competition
1.	12 October 2008	Prince Louis Rwagasore Stadium, Bujumbura, Burundi	Burundi	1–0	3–1	2010 FIFA World Cup qualification
2.	20 June 2009	Stade du 4 Août, Ouagadougou, Burkina Faso	Ivory Coast	2–3	2–3	2010 FIFA World Cup qualification
3.	4 June 2011	Independence Stadium, Windhoek, Namibia	Namibia	2–0	4–1	2012 Africa Cup of Nations qualification
4.	11 November 2011	Stade Municipal, Paris, France	Mali	1–1	1–1	Friendly
5.	14 November 2012	Stade El Abdi, El Jadida, Morocco	DR Congo	1–0	1–0	Friendly
6.	17 January 2013	Mbombela Stadium, Nelspruit, South Africa	Swaziland	1–0	3–0	Friendly
7.	6 February 2013	Mbombela Stadium, Nelspruit, South Africa	Ghana	1–1	1–1	2013 Africa Cup of Nations
8.	23 March 2013	Stade du 4 Août, Ouagadougou, Burkina Faso	Niger	2–0	4–0	2014 FIFA World Cup qualification
9.	15 June 2013	Stade Municipal, Pointe-Noire, Republic of the Congo	Congo	1–0	1–0	2014 FIFA World Cup qualification
10.	12 October 2013	Stade du 4 Août, Ouagadougou, Burkina Faso	Algeria	3–2	3–2	2014 FIFA World Cup qualification
11.	10 October 2014	Estádio 11 de Novembro, Luanda, Angola	Angola	1–0	3–0	2015 Africa Cup of Nations qualification
12.	10 January 2015	Mbombela Stadium, Nelspruit, South Africa	Swaziland	5–1	5–1	Friendly
13.	13 January 2015	Mbombela Stadium, Nelspruit, South Africa	Botswana	2–0	2–0	Friendly
14.	25 January 2015	Estadio de Ebibeyin, Ebibeyin, Equatorial Guinea	Congo	1–1	1–2	2015 Africa Cup of Nations
15.	6 June 2015	Stade Yves-du-Manoir, Paris, France	Cameroon	2–1	2–3	Friendly
16.	13 June 2015	Stade du 4 Août, Ouagadougou, Burkina Faso	Comoros	1–0	2–0	2017 Africa Cup of Nations qualification
17.	19 October 2015	Stade de l'Aube, Troyes, France	Mali	1–2	1–4	Friendly
18.	28 January 2017	Stade d'Angondjé, Libreville, Gabon	Tunisia	1–0	2–0	2017 Africa Cup of Nations
19.	1 February 2017	Stade de l'Amitié, Libreville, Gabon	Egypt	1–1	1–1	2017 Africa Cup of Nations
20.	10 June 2017	Stade du 4 Août, Ouagadougou, Burkina Faso	Angola	1–0	3–1	2019 Africa Cup of Nations qualification
21.	10 June 2017	Stade du 4 Août, Ouagadougou, Burkina Faso	Angola	2–1	3–1	2019 Africa Cup of Nations qualification
22.	22 March 2018	Stade Didier Pironi, Paris, France	Guinea-Bissau	2–0	2–0	Friendly
23.	17 November 2019	Khartoum Stadium, Khartoum, Sudan	South Sudan	1–0	2–1	2021 Africa Cup of Nations qualification
24.	17 November 2019	Khartoum Stadium, Khartoum, Sudan	South Sudan	2–0	2–1	2021 Africa Cup of Nations qualification

== Honours ==
Mainz

- DFB-Pokal semi-finalist: 2008–09
- 2. Bundesliga runner-up: 2008–09

HJK

- Veikkausliiga: 2014
- Finnish Cup: 2014

ASEC Mimosas

- Ligue 1: 2016–17

Al-Masry

- Egypt Cup runner-up: 2016–17
- Egyptian Super Cup runner-up: 2017–18

Al-Ahli

- UAE League Cup: 2011–12

Burkina Faso

- Africa Cup of Nations runner-up: 2013; third-place: 2017

Individual

- Ligue 1 top scorer: 2016–17 (13 goals)
