= Guyan Kanté =

Ivorian footballer

Guyan Joe Kanté
Personal information
- Full name: Joe Souleymane Dit Guyan Kanté
- Date of birth: 5 January 1982 (age 44)
- Place of birth: Ouragahio, Ivory Coast
- Height: 1.83 m (6 ft 0 in)
- Position: Goalkeeper

Team information
- Current team: SOA
- Number: 22

Youth career
- –1999: Académie de Sol Beni

Senior career*
| Years | Team | Apps | (Gls) |
| 2000–2007 | ASEC Mimosas | 57 | (0) |
| 2007–2009 | Issia Wazi | ? | (?) |
| 2009–2010 | AS Denguélé | ? | (?) |
| 2010– | SOA | | |

International career^{‡}
| 2003 | Ivory Coast | 1 | (0) |
- * Club domestic league appearances and goals as of August 17, 2009 ‡ National team caps and goals as of August 17, 2009

Joe Souleymane Dit Guyan Kanté (born 5 January 1982) is an Ivorian former footballer who played as a goalkeeper for SOA.

== Career ==
Kanté began his career in the Académie de Sol Beni, before he was called up for ASEC Mimosas first squad and played with his team in the 2004 MTN Champions League. He left ASEC in January 2007 and moved to league side club Issia Wazi. For the 2009 season, Kanté joined the AS Denguélé. In 2010, Kanté will be playing for SOA.

== International career ==
He was a member of the Ivory Coast national football team.

== Personal life ==
Guyan is the older brother to Adama Kanté, who is also a football goalkeeper. In 2009, both played together for the same team, the AS Denguélé.
