= Toumodi FC =

Ivorian football club

Toumodi F.C.
- Full name: Toumodi Football Club Bassam
- Ground: Stade de Toumodi; Bassam
- Capacity: 5,000

Toumodi F.C. is an Ivorian football club, which is based in Bassam. The club plays in Zone 4 of the Ivory Coast Deuxieme Division, and is part of the Côte d'Ivoire Premier Division.

In 1999, Toumodi were runner-ups of the Ligue 2.
