= Abengourou Airport =

Airport serving Abengourou, Côte d'Ivoire

- IATA: OGO; ICAO: DIAU

Summary
- Airport type: Public
- Serves: Abengourou
- Elevation AMSL: 676 ft / 206 m
- Coordinates: 6°42′56″N 3°28′13″W

Map

Runways
Direction	Length		Surface
Direction	ft	m	Surface
18/36	3,940	1,200	Unpaved
- Source: Google Maps

Abengourou Airport (IATA: OGO, ICAO: DIAU) is an airport serving Abengourou, Côte d'Ivoire.

== See also ==
- Transport in Côte d'Ivoire
