= CO Bouaflé =

Ivorian football club

- Full name: Club Omnisport Bouaflé
- Ground: Stade de Yamoussoukro; Yamoussoukro, Ivory Coast
- Capacity: 6,000
- League: Côte d'Ivoire Premier Division

Club Omnisport Bouaflé (CO Bouaflé) is an Ivorian football club based in Bouaflé. The club is a member of the Ivorian Football Federation Premiere Division. They play at Stade de Yamoussoukro.

== League participations ==
- Ligue 1 (Ivory Coast): 2013–
- Ligue 2 (Ivory Coast): ?-2013

== Honours ==
- Coupe de Côte d'Ivoire de football:2004

== Performance in CAF competitions ==
- 2005 CAF Confederation Cup: Preliminary Round
