= AS Athlétic d'Adjamé =

Ivorian association football club

Association Sportive Athlétic d'Adjamé is an Ivorian association football club based in Adjamé.

The men's football team played in the Ligue 2 until 2018–19, when the club ended last in Pool A and was relegated. The same year, the team reached the third round of the Ivorian Cup.
