= Ivory Coast national under-20 football team =

National under-20 association football team representing Ivory Coast

Ivory Coast
- Nickname(s): Les Petits Éléphants (The Small Elephants)
- Association: Ivorian Football Federation
- Confederation: CAF (Africa)
- Sub-confederation: WAFU (West Africa)
- Head coach: François Zahoui
- Home stadium: Alassane Ouattara Stadium
First colours	Second colours

U-20 Africa Cup of Nations
- Appearances: 11 (first in 1983)
- Best result: Runners-up (1983, 1991, 2003)

FIFA U-20 World Cup
- Appearances: 5 (first in 1977)
- Best result: Round of 16 (2003)

Ivory Coast national under-20 football team, also known as Côte d'Ivoire Under-20s or Ivory Coast U20(s), represents Ivory Coast in association football at an under-20 age level and is controlled by Ivorian Football Federation, the governing body for football in Ivory Coast.

== Players ==
=== Current squad ===
No.	Pos.	Player	Date of birth (age)	Caps	Goals	Club
	GK	Yvann Konan	7 March 2002 (age 24)	1	0	(French Football Federation) Lyon
	GK	Kombo Kouassi	8 April 2004 (age 22)	0	0	(Ivorian Football Federation) FC San Pédro
	DF	Michel Diaz	23 July 2003 (age 23)	1	0	(French Football Federation) Nantes
	DF	Mohamed Ali Yabré	30 October 2004 (age 21)	1	0	(Ivorian Football Federation) SOA
	DF	Eroine Agnikoi		0	0	(Ivorian Football Federation) Stade d'Abidjan
	DF	Souleymane Assane		0	0	(Ivorian Football Federation) FC San Pédro
	DF	Kareen Samassi		0	0	(Ivorian Football Federation) SOA
	DF	Aboubacar Sylla	31 December 2003 (age 22)	0	0	(Royal Belgian Football Association) Oud-Heverlee Leuven
	DF	Luc Zogbe		0	0	(Ivorian Football Federation) LYS Sassandra
	MF	Jean N'Guessan	17 April 2003 (age 23)	1	0	(French Football Federation) Nîmes
	MF	Sidiki Camara	23 August 2002 (age 24)	0	0	(Swiss Football Association) Servette
	MF	Isaaé Cisse		0	0	(Ivorian Football Federation) SOA
	MF	Ibrahim Diabate		0	0	(Ivorian Football Federation) SOL FC
	MF	Arafat Doumbia	16 November 2004 (age 21)	0	0	(Ivorian Football Federation) SOA
	MF	Ibrahim Fofana	2 October 2003 (age 23)	0	0	(French Football Federation) Amiens
	MF	Abdramane Konaté	25 June 2006 (age 20)	0	0	(Ivorian Football Federation) FC San Pédro
	FW	David Datro Fofana	22 December 2002 (age 23)	1	0	(The Football Association) Chelsea
	FW	Fernand Gouré	12 April 2002 (age 24)	0	0	(Hungarian Football Federation) Újpest
	FW	N'Dri Koffi	9 March 2002 (age 24)	0	0	(French Football Federation) Le Mans
	FW	Yaya Sogodogo		0	0	(Ivorian Football Federation) SOA
	FW	Yassine Toure		0	0	(The Football Association) Leicester City

== Competitive record ==
=== FIFA U-20 World Cup record ===
FIFA U-20 World Cup record
Year	Round	GP	W	D^{1}	L	GS	GA
(Tunisia) 1977	Group stage	3	0	2	1	2	5
(Japan) 1979	Did not qualify						
(Australia) 1981	Did not qualify						
(Mexico) 1983	Group stage	3	0	1	2	3	7
(Soviet Union) 1985	Did not qualify						
(Chile) 1987	Did not qualify						
(Saudi Arabia) 1989	Did not qualify						
(Portugal) 1991	Group stage	3	0	1	2	2	8
(Australia) 1993	Did not qualify						
(Qatar) 1995	Did not qualify						
(Malaysia) 1997	Group stage	3	0	1	2	2	5
(Nigeria) 1999	Did not qualify						
(Argentina) 2001	Did not qualify						
(United Arab Emirates) 2003	Round of 16	4	1	2	1	4	5
(Netherlands) 2005	Did not qualify						
(Canada) 2007	Did not qualify						
(Egypt) 2009	Did not qualify						
(Colombia) 2011	Did not qualify						
(Turkey) 2013	Did not qualify						
(New Zealand) 2015	Did not qualify						
(South Korea) 2017	Did not qualify						
(Poland) 2019	Did not qualify						
(Argentina) 2023	Did not qualify						
(Chile) 2025	Did not qualify						
(Azerbaijan) (Uzbekistan) 2027	Did not qualify						
(Armenia) (Georgia (country)) 2029	To be determined						
Total	5/26	16	1	7	8	13	30

== Past squads ==
- 1977 FIFA World Youth Championship squads
- 1983 FIFA World Youth Championship squads
- 1991 FIFA World Youth Championship squads
- 1997 FIFA World Youth Championship squads
- 2003 FIFA World Youth Championship squads
