= Football in Ivory Coast =

Football in the Ivory Coast
- Country: Ivory Coast
- Governing body: Ivorian Football Federation
- National team: Men's · Women's

National competitions
- Coupe de Côte d'Ivoire

Club competitions
- Ligue 1 (Ivory Coast)

International competitions
- Champions League; CAF Confederation Cup; Super Cup; FIFA Club World Cup; FIFA World Cup (National Team); African Cup of Nations (National Team)

Football is the most popular sport in Ivory Coast. 50% of the Ivorian people consider themselves football fan. Algeria, Cameroon, Ghana, Morocco, Senegal and South Africa are the only African countries with an equal or higher percentage.

The national team won the Africa Cup of Nations in Senegal in 1992. In 2006 they participated in the 2006 World Cup in Germany. The youth national teams have also done well in world championships, and the clubs from Ivory Coast have won several continental titles. The Ivory Coast national team won a second African cup of nations in 2015.

Famous players from the country include Kolo Touré, Didier Drogba, Wilfried Bony, Yaya Touré, Gervinho, Seydou Doumbia, and Salomon Kalou.

== National competitions ==
The national championship, organised by the Ivorian Football Federation and sponsored by the company Orange, features 16 clubs in Division 1, 36 in Division 2, 36 in Division 3.

Two national cups, the Coupe de Côte d'Ivoire and the Coupe Houphouët-Boigny, put these clubs to grips every year.

Level	League(s)/Division(s)			
1	Ligue 1; 14 clubs			
2	Ligue 2 Poule A 12 clubs		Ligue 2 Poule B 12 clubs	
3	Championnat D3 Poule A 10 clubs	Championnat D3 Poule B 10 clubs	Championnat D3 Poule C 9 clubs	Championnat D3 Poule D 9 clubs

== International Competitions ==
=== National Teams ===
In 1984 the Ivory Coast organized the African Cup of Nations with matches in Abidjan and Bouaké. To support the National team and because of the popularity of this sport in the country, the government decided to close the schools for the duration of the competition. Although the national team was eliminated in the first round of the event, no course took place for 2 weeks.

The national team won the African Cup of Nations in 1992 and was a finalist in the competition in 2006. In 2006, for the first time in its history, Ivory Coast qualified for the 2006 FIFA World Cup. In 2008, his Olympic team qualified for the 2008 Summer Olympics.

=== Clubs ===
- ASEC Mimosas is based in Abidjan and won the CAF Champions League in the 1998 edition. They also won the 1999 CAF Super Cup over Espérance sportive de Tunis
- Stade Abidjan is based in Abidjan and was the first Ivory Coast club to win a continental competition when they won the 1966 African Cup of Champions Clubs.
- Africa Sports d'Abidjan is based in Abidjan and won the 1992 and 1999 editions of the African Cup Winners' Cup.
- Stella Club d'Adjamé is based in Abidjan the CAF Super Cup in 1993.

Ivory Coast clubs have won 6 continental trophies: two in the African Champions League, three Cup victories and a cup success of the African Football Confederation. It should be added that Ivory Coast has also won several small subregional tournaments (West Africa) in the club or with its national team. In particular the tournaments of the Council of the Agreement those of ECOWAS or those organised by the UFOA, the Union of the West African Football federations.

== Women's football ==
The women's national team qualified for the 2015 FIFA Women's World Cup.

== Support ==
Twitter research from 2015 found that the most popular English Premier League club in Ivory Coast was Chelsea, with 35% of Ivorian Premier League fans following the club, followed by Arsenal (23%) and Manchester United (15%).

== Attendances ==
The average attendance per top-flight football league season and the club with the highest average attendance:

Season	League average	Best club	Best club average
2023-24	374	ASEC Mimosas	1,012

Source: League page on Wikipedia
