= US Koumassi =

U.S. Koumassi
- Full name: Union Sportive Koumassi
- Founded: 1999
- Ground: Stade Union Sportive de Koumassi
- Capacity: 2,000
- Chairman: Faye Oumar; Issa Zongo (vice president); Boudo Mory (vice president)
- Sporting director: Konate Salif
- Coach: Sall Ousmane Oumar
- League: Côte d'Ivoire Ligue 4

Union Sportive Koumassi is an Ivorian football club based in Abidjan.

== History ==
The club was founded in 1999. Being a member of the Ivorian Football Federation Côte d'Ivoire Ligue 2 since 2008, their best result was a first place in 2015.

== Current squad ==
As of January 2019 Note: Flags indicate national team as defined under FIFA eligibility rules; some limited exceptions apply. Players may hold more than one non-FIFA nationality.

No.	Pos.	Nation	Player
—	GK	CIV	OUDOU TRAORE
—	GK	NGA	Kassim Atanda
—	DF	CIV	Lamine Sanogo
—	DF	CIV	Siaka Kone
20	DF	CIV	ATTA BAHI BENI SAMUEL
—	DF	CIV	Ibrahim Kamara
—	DF	CIV	Ibrahim Cisse
—	DF	CIV	Vandou Bamba
—	DF	CIV	Thio Pichionnier
—	DF	CIV	Junior Dago Degri
—	DF	CIV	Mohamed Kaba
—	DF	CIV	Kader Arsene Tiendrebeogo
—	DF	CIV	Mamadou Youssouf Soumahoro
—	MF	CIV	Denis Eugene N'gessan
14	MF	CIV	KOUAKOU KOUASSI JEA JACQUES
—	MF	CIV	Hamed Guindo
—	MF	CIV	Kouakou Didier Yao
—	MF	CIV	Mamadou Be Coulibaly
—	MF	CIV	Abdoul Razack Zeba
—	MF	CIV	Moussa Comara

No.	Pos.	Nation	Player
—	MF	CIV	Viera Ismail
—	MF	CIV	Aboubakar Michael Sangare
10	MF	CIV	BOGNINI JUNIOR
—	MF	CIV	Souleymane Coulibaly
—	MF	CIV	Karamoko Bamba
—	MF	NGA	Olalekan Adeoye
—	FW	GHA	Yao Luckson Manzan
9	FW	CIV	DOUKOURE ABDOULAYE
—	FW	CIV	Jean Michel Kore
—	FW	CIV	Souleymane Ouattara
—	FW	CIV	Siaka Kone
—	FW	CIV	Mamadou Diarrassouba
—	FW	CIV	Yaya Kone
—	FW	CIV	Cheick Nimaga Traore
—	FW	CIV	Nogbou Manouan Markdonald
—	FW	CIV	Ives Marcel Zigani
—	FW	CIV	Yusuf Ali Ouattara
—	FW	CIV	Youssouf Traore
—	FW	CIV	Aboubakar Fofana
