= Yopougon FC =

Football club in Ivory Coast

- Full name: Yopougon Football Club
- Founded: 1987
- Ground: Stade de Anguédédou
- Chairman: Valentin Séry Gnaoré
- Manager: Sery Henry
- League: Côte d'Ivoire Second Division
- 2009: 3rd Place

Yopougon FC is an Ivorian football club based in Yopougon. Currently, the club formerly known as Oryx FC de Yopougon plays in Ivory Coast's second Division Poule Abidjan.

== Current squad ==
As of July 2009 Note: Flags indicate national team as defined under FIFA eligibility rules; some limited exceptions apply. Players may hold more than one non-FIFA nationality.

No.	Pos.	Nation	Player
—	GK	CMR	Armand Kemajou
—	GK	CIV	Souleymane Diaby
—	GK	BEN	Christian Akande
—	DF	CIV	Ismael Amiral Diabaté
—	DF	CIV	Bakary Coulibaly
—	DF	CIV	Kouamé Franck Stéphane Kouadio
—	DF	CIV	Richard Anderson Boua Kouassi
—	DF	CIV	Vadamah Soumahoro
—	DF	CIV	Koffi Aristide Kouakou
—	MF	CIV	Zoumana Fofana
—	MF	CIV	Mohamed Kamagaté
—	MF	CIV	Maxime Boua Bi Tra

No.	Pos.	Nation	Player
—	MF	CIV	Souleymane Koné
—	MF	CIV	Alain Didier Lenohin
—	MF	CIV	Kan Joseph Kouassi
—	MF	CIV	Donatien Séry Koré
—	MF	CIV	Serge Ahmed Beugré
—	FW	CIV	N'Poué Tchimou
—	FW	CIV	Adolphe Kouadio
—	FW	CIV	Namory Kéita
—	FW	CIV	Arsène Koué Bi Tié
—	FW	CIV	Eric Doumbia Siékoua
—	FW	CIV	Shoualio Diarra
