= Coupe de Côte d'Ivoire =

Football tournament in the Ivory Coast

- Founded: 1960
- Region: Ivory Coast
- 2025 Coupe de Côte d'Ivoire

The Coupe de Côte d'Ivoire (lit. 'Ivory Coast Cup') is the top knockout tournament in Ivory Coast. It was created in 1960.

== Winners ==
Previous winners are:

Year	Winner	Score	Finalist
1960	Espoir de Man	6–1	Réveil Club de Daloa
1961	Africa Sports d'Abidjan	2–1	Stade d'Abidjan
1962	Mimosas	4–2	Africa Sports d'Abidjan
1963	Jeunesse Club d'Abidjan	2–1	Union S. Man
1964	Africa Sports d'Abidjan	1–0	AS RAN (Agboville)
1967	Mimosas	2–1 (a.e.t.)	Stella Club d'Adjamé
1968	Mimosas	3–2	Stade d'Abidjan
1969	Mimosas	2–2 (a.e.t.) (2–1 corners)	Africa Sports d'Abidjan
1970	Mimosas	2–2, 0–0, 2–1	Stella Club d'Adjamé
1971	Stade d'Abidjan	4–1	Sporting Club de Gagnoa
1972	Mimosas	2–1	Stade d'Abidjan
1973	Mimosas	2–1	Stella Club d'Adjamé
1974	Stella Club d'Adjamé	2–0	Africa Sports d'Abidjan
1975	Stella Club d'Adjamé	1–1 (a.e.t.) (4–2 pen.)	Sporting Club de Gagnoa
1976	Stade d'Abidjan	3–3 (a.e.t.) (4–2 pen.)	Mimosas
1977	Africa Sports d'Abidjan	1–1 (a.e.t.) (4–3 pen.)	Alliance Bouaké
1978	Africa Sports d'Abidjan	1–1 (a.e.t.) (3–1 pen.)	Sporting Club de Gagnoa
1979	Africa Sports d'Abidjan	6–2	Sporting Club de Gagnoa
1980	Réveil Club de Daloa	2–1	Stella Club d'Adjamé
1981	Africa Sports d'Abidjan	2–1	Stella Club d'Adjamé
1982	Africa Sports d'Abidjan	1–0	ES Senou
1983	Mimosas	2–0	USC Bassam
1984	Stade d'Abidjan	2–0	Sporting Club de Gagnoa
1985	Africa Sports d'Abidjan	3–0	Sporting Club de Gagnoa
1986	Africa Sports d'Abidjan	1–0	Mimosas
1987	ASC Bouaké	2–1	EECI
1988	ASI Abengourou	2–1	Stade d'Abidjan
1989	Africa Sports d'Abidjan	2–1	AS Sotra
1990	Mimosas	2–0	Sporting Club de Gagnoa
1993	Africa Sports d'Abidjan	2–1	ASC Bouaké
1994	Stade d'Abidjan	4–2	Africa Sports d'Abidjan
1995	Mimosas	2–0	Stade d'Abidjan
1996	SOA	0–0 (a.e.t.) (10–9 pen.)	Africa Sports d'Abidjan
1997	Mimosas	4–0	Africa Sports d'Abidjan
1998	Africa Sports d'Abidjan	3–0 (a.e.t.)	Stade d'Abidjan
1999	Mimosas	5–0	Séwé Sports de San Pedro
2000	Stade d'Abidjan	2–1	Mimosas
2001	Alliance Bouaké	2–0	ASC Bouaké
2002	Africa Sports d'Abidjan	2–0	RFC Daoukro
2003	Mimosas	1–1 (a.e.t.) (4–2 pen.)	Africa Sports d'Abidjan
2004	CO Bouaflé	2–1	Stade d'Abidjan
2005	Mimosas	1–0	Séwé Sports de San Pedro
2006	Issia Wazy	1–0	SOA
2007	Mimosas	3–0 (a.e.t.)	Issia Wazy
2008	Mimosas	1–0	Jeunesse Club d'Abidjan
2009	Africa Sports d'Abidjan	2–1	Mimosas
2010	Africa Sports d'Abidjan	2–0	Jeunesse Club d'Abidjan
2011	Mimosas	1–1 (a.e.t.) (5–4 pen.)	ASI Abengourou
2012	Stella Club d'Adjamé	1–0	Séwé Sports de San Pedro
2013	Mimosas	0–0 (a.e.t.) (5–4 pen.)	Stella Club d'Adjamé
2014	Mimosas	2–1 (a.e.t.)	Séwé Sports de San Pedro
2015	Africa Sports d'Abidjan	1–0	CO Bouaflé
2016	Séwé Sports	2–1	Mimosas
2017	Africa Sports d'Abidjan	3–0	Tanda
2018	Mimosas	1–1 (a.e.t.) (5–3 pen.)	Stade d'Abidjan
2019	FC San Pédro	1–0	AFAD Djékanou
2020	Cancelled due to the effects of the COVID-19 pandemic.		
2021–22	Not held		
2023	Mimosas	2–0	AFAD Djékanou
2024	Racing Club Abidjan	1–0	Mimosas
2025	San Pédro	1–1 (a.e.t.) (4–2 pen.)	Racing Club Abidjan
2026	CO Korhogo	1–1 (a.e.t.) (4–3 pen.)	SOA
