= Ligue 2 (Ivory Coast) =

- Country: Ivory Coast
- Confederation: CAF
- Number of clubs: 24
- Level on pyramid: 2
- Promotion to: Ligue 1
- Relegation to: Championnat D3
- Domestic cup: Coupe de Côte d'Ivoire de football
- Website: Fédération Ivoirienne de Football
- Current: 2025-26 Ligue 2 (Côte d'Ivoire)

The Ivory Coast Ligue 2 is the second tier of Ivorian Football. It is divided into two (2) pools, Pool A and Pool B, with each pool having twelve (12) teams.

== Results ==
Season	Champion	Vice-champion
1997	USC Bassam	Alliance Bouaké
1998	RC Daloa	Satellite FC
1999	JC Abidjan	Toumodi FC
2000	RC Daloa	CO Bouaflé
2001	Stella d'Adjamé	Rio Sports
2002	ES Bingerville	SO Armée
2003	Denguelé Sports	Séwé Sports
2004	Issia Wazy	SC Gagnoa
2005	EFYM	Lakota FC
2006	SO Armée	Lagoké Daloa
2007	USC Bassam	ASC Ouragahio
2008	Séwé Sports	EFYM
2009	AFAD Djékanou	Hiré FC
2010	Adzopé FC	ASI Abengourou
2011	ES Bingerville	EFYM
2012	SC Gagnoa	CO Korhogo
2012-13	CO Bouaflé	AS Tanda
2013-14	Bouaké FC	Stade d'Abidjan
2014-15	Yopougon FC	Moossou FC
2015-16	WAC	FC San-Pédro
2016-17	USC Bassam	Bouaké FC
2017-18	LYS Sassandra	RC Abidjan
2018-19	SOL	Issia Wazy
2019-20	Competition abandoned	
2020-21	LYS Sassandra	Korhogo
2021-22	Stade d'Abidjan	Denguélé
