= RC Abidjan =

Ivorian football club

- Full name: Racing Club Abidjan
- Nickname: Lions
- Founded: 2006
- Ground: Stade Robert Champroux
- Capacity: 5,000
- Chairman: Souleymane Cissé
- Manager: Moïse Yeboua
- League: Ligue 2
- 2025–26: Ligue 1, 14 of 16 (relegation)
- Website: www.racingclubabidjan.net
Home colours	Away colours

Racing Club Abidjan, known as RC Abidjan, is a football club based in Abidjan, Ivory Coast. Currently, the club plays in Ivory Coast's Ligue 1.

== History ==
Club was founded in 2006 as Cissé Institoute. In 2014 was bought FC Kokoumbo. Team in 2015/16 season won D3. In 2017 was changed name into Racing Club Abidjan. In 2017/18 season team won in Ligue 2 and was promoted to Top division. In 2018/19 season team was in 4 place.

In 2018, the club signed a partnership with French club OGC Nice.

== Kit evolution ==
- Team plays with blue shirts with white signs. .

Home	Away	Away	Away

== Current squad ==
As of 10 January 2022

Note: Flags indicate national team as defined under FIFA eligibility rules; some limited exceptions apply. Players may hold more than one non-FIFA nationality.

No.	Pos.	Nation	Player
16	GK	CIV	Foungnigue Yeo
22	GK	TOG	Charles Folly Ayayi
3	DF	CIV	Mohamed Ouattara
4	DF	CIV	Thaula Théophile Oura
5	DF	CIV	Mounan Osée Niegbo
13	DF	CIV	Vianey Bregui
23	DF	CIV	Baptistin Goha
25	DF	CIV	Ibrahima Dosso

No.	Pos.	Nation	Player
29	DF	CIV	Zoumana Sidibé
30	DF	CIV	Mamadou Koné
8	MF	CIV	Fousseni Silué
11	MF	CIV	Sidick Aboubacar Camara
20	MF	CIV	Hibrahime Oularé
26	MF	CIV	Abdul Rahmane Konaté
9	FW	MLI	Seydou Traoré
10	FW	CIV	Roland Zan Bi

== Honours ==
=== Domestic ===
- Côte d'Ivoire Premier Division: 1
  - 2019–20
- Côte d'Ivoire Cup: 1
  - 2024
