= FC San Pédro =

Association football club in Ivory Coast

- Full name: Football Club San-Pédro
- Founded: 2004; 22 years ago
- Ground: Stade Laurent Pokou
- Capacity: 20,000
- Chairman: (Tunisia) Hachicha Mohamed Ali
- Manager: (Ivory Coast) Mahamadou Sangaré
- League: Ligue 1
- 2025–26: Ligue 1, 2nd of 14
Home colours	Away colours

Football Club San-Pédro is an Ivorian football club based in San-Pédro.

== History ==
It was founded in 2004 in the city of San Pédro and the nation to compete with Séwé Sports de San Pédro, the most important club in the city that has participated on several occasions in continental tournaments.

In the 2015/16 season, they achieved promotion to the Ivory Coast First Division for the first time in their history after finishing sub-championship in the second division, losing in the final against Williamsville AC.

In their first season in the first division they finished in ninth place 2016/17 season, and in the following season they finished in third place 2017/18 season, with which they managed to qualify for the first time in a continental tournament.

Their first international participation was in the 2018-19 CAF Confederation Cup, where they were eliminated in the playoff round by Nkana FC from Zambia.

== Current squad ==
As of 08 April 2024

Note: Flags indicate national team as defined under FIFA eligibility rules; some limited exceptions apply. Players may hold more than one non-FIFA nationality.

No.	Pos.	Nation	Player
—	GK	CIV	Kombo Kouassi
—	GK	CIV	Edjeno Ezéchiel N’Goran
—	DF	CIV	Franck Yoan
—	DF	CIV	Abdoul Karim Diaby
—	DF	CIV	Sitionan Konaté
—	DF	CIV	Bangaly Fofana
—	MF	GHA	Saaba Gariba
—	MF	CIV	Karim Fofana
—	MF	CIV	Lou Fan Williams
—	MF	TOG	Richard Boro
—	MF	TOG	Moïse Adjahli

No.	Pos.	Nation	Player
—	MF	CIV	Alpha Sidibé
—	MF	CIV	Adama Soumahoro
—	FW	CIV	Adama Keita
—	FW	CIV	Issouf Dosso
—	FW	CIV	Mory Coulibaly
—	FW	CIV	Ladji Lancine Bamba
—	FW	CIV	Alassane Doumbia
—	FW	CIV	Guy Stéphane Bédi
—	FW	CIV	Kouadio Konan
—	FW	CIV	Jean Ariel Koffi
—	FW	CMR	Alphonse Kevin Assiga

=== Out on loan ===
Note: Flags indicate national team as defined under FIFA eligibility rules; some limited exceptions apply. Players may hold more than one non-FIFA nationality.

No.	Pos.	Nation	Player

== Honours ==
- Ligue 1
  - Winners (1): 2024.
- Côte d'Ivoire Cup
  - Winners (2): 2019, 2025.
