= AS Tanda =

Ivorian football club

- Full name: Association Sportive Tanda
- Nickname: Les Étoiles du Zanzan
- Ground: Stade Henri Konan Bédié; Abengourou, Ivory Coast
- Capacity: 3,000
- League: Ligue 2
- 2025–26: Ligue 2, Group A, 10 th of 14
Home colours	Away colours

Association Sportive Tanda, more commonly known as AS Tanda or just Tanda, is an Ivorian football club based in Tanda in the Gontougo Region.

They are a member of the Ivorian Football Federation Premiere Division.

== Stadium ==
Currently the team plays at the 3000-capacity Stade Henri Konan Bédié.

== League participations ==
- Côte d'Ivoire Premier Division: 2013–present
- Ligue 2 (Ivory Coast): ?–2013

== Honours ==
- Côte d'Ivoire Premier Division: 2
  - 2014–15, 2015–16
- Coupe Houphouët-Boigny: 1
  - 2016

== Performance in CAF competitions ==
- CAF Champions League: 0 appearance

- CAF Confederation Cup: 0 appearance

- CAF Super Cup: 0 appearance

== Current squad ==
As of 11 November 2021

Note: Flags indicate national team as defined under FIFA eligibility rules; some limited exceptions apply. Players may hold more than one non-FIFA nationality.

No.	Pos.	Nation	Player
—	GK	CIV	Adama Cissé
—	GK	CIV	Hamed Coulibaly
—	MF	CIV	Oumar Sako
—	DF	CIV	Marcel Kouakou
—	DF	CIV	Marius Gnabouyou
—	MF	CIV	Choumana Coulibaly
—	MF	CIV	Patrick Bini
—	MF	CIV	Martial N'Goran
—	MF	CGO	Oumar Touré
—	DF	CIV	Seydou Touré
—	MF	CIV	Pacôme Kouadio
—	MF	CIV	Roméo Kouamé

No.	Pos.	Nation	Player
—	DF	CIV	Willie Britto
—	FW	CIV	Laurent Sahui
—	DF	CIV	Tiécoura Coulibaly
—	FW	CIV	Guy Kouamé
—	MF	CIV	Essis Aka
—	DF	CIV	Hermann Tiéguéhi
—	MF	CIV	Moyabi Koné
—	FW	CIV	Thierry Kassi
—	FW	CIV	Maixent Zagré
