= USC Bassam =

Ivorian football club

- Full name: Union Sportive des Clubs de Bassam
- Ground: Stade Municipal de Bassam; Abidjan, Ivory Coast
- Capacity: 5,000
- League: Ligue 1
- 2020–21: 5th in B group
Home colours	Away colours

USC Bassam is an Ivorian football club. They play at Stade Municipal de Bassam.

== Honours ==
- Ligue 2
  - Winners (1): 2016-17
- Coupe de la Ligue de Côte d'Ivoire
  - Winners (1): 2020
