= LYS Sassandra =

Ivorian football club

- Full name: Limane Yacouba Sylla Football Club de Sassandra
- Nickname: LYS
- Founded: 2016; 10 years ago
- Ground: Stade Auguste Denise; Robert Champroux
- Capacity: 8,000; 5,000
- Chairman: (Ivory Coast) Ruphin Assié
- Head coach: (Lebanon) Jalal Radwan
- League: Ligue 2
- 2025–26: Ligue 2, Group B, 12th of 16
- Website: lyssassandrafc.com

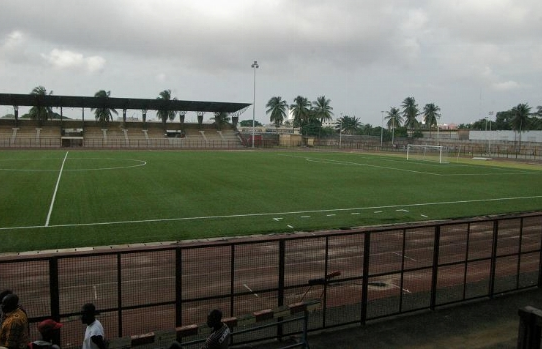
Robert Champroux Stadium

Limane Yacouba Sylla Football Club de Sassandra, commonly known as LYS Sassandra or LYS FC, is an Ivorian professional football club based in Sassandra. The club is a member of the Ivorian Football Federation Premiere Division.

In 2019, the club won the 2017-18 Ligue 2 season and promoted to the first division but finished second to last and was again relegated to the second division. As consolation, they won its first trophy this year, the Coupe de la Ligue de Côte d'Ivoire.

The club won 2020-21 Ligue 2 season and promoted again to the Ivorian Ligue 1 in 2021 and ended its season in sixth place.

In April 2022, the club is the only one to support Didier Drogba in the election for the presidency of the Ivorian Football Federation, even if the former international loses the election, the club gains sympathy throughout the country.

== Competitions ==
- 2016–18: Ligue 2
- 2018–19: Ligue 1
- 2019–21: Ligue 2
- 2021–... : Ligue 1

== Honours ==
- Ligue 2
  - Champions (2): 2017–18, 2020–21
- Coupe de la Ligue
  - Winners (1): 2019

== Squad ==
=== Current roster ===
Note: Flags indicate national team as defined under FIFA eligibility rules; some limited exceptions apply. Players may hold more than one non-FIFA nationality.

No.	Pos.	Nation	Player
1	GK	CIV	Abdoul Karim Cissé
16	GK	TOG	Achirafou Yaya
2	DF	CIV	Ngoran Kouassi Crépin
14	DF	CIV	Sékou Samaké
—	MF	BFA	Bagbéma Barro
—	MF	CIV	Oularé Hibrahime

No.	Pos.	Nation	Player
—	MF	CIV	Jean Marco Koffi
—	MF	CIV	Ibrahim Pooda Dah
—	MF	CIV	Christ Douei
—	FW	CIV	Abdoul Voli Bi
—	FW	FRA	Christopher Attolou

=== Notable players ===
- (Ivory Coast) Abdoul Karim Cissé (2023–...)
- (Ivory Coast) Koffi Dakoi (2020–2024)
- (Ivory Coast) Marius Tresor Doh (2021–2024)
- (Ivory Coast) Ben Hamed Touré (2020–2021)
- (Ivory Coast) Luck Zogbé (2022–2023)
- (Nigeria) Godwin Zaki (2022–2024)
- (Ivory Coast) Patrick Ouotro (2022–2024)

=== Former managers ===
- (Ivory Coast) Basile Aka Kouamé: 2018–19
- (Morocco) Rachid Ghaflaoui: 2023–24
- (Lebanon) Jalal Radwan: 2024–25
