= Williamsville Athletic Club =

Ivorian football club

Williamsville AC
- Full name: Williamsville Athletic Club
- Nickname: Les Guêpes
- Founded: 1995
- Ground: Stade Robert Champroux, Abidjan
- Capacity: 3,000
- Chairman: Abakar Koné
- Manager: Kjetil Zachariassen
- League: Ligue 2
- 2025–26: 6th of 14 in Group A
Home colours

Williamsville Athletic Club, abbreviated as WAC, is an Ivorian football club based in Abidjan.

It was announced in December 2017 that Ivorian footballer Didier Drogba had joined the club as a board member.

== Honours ==
- Côte d'Ivoire Premier Division: 0

Runners-up: 2017

== Performance in CAF competitions ==
- CAF Champions League: 1 appearance

2018 –

== Former managers ==
- Kjetil Zachariassen (2018-2018)
- Rachid Ghaflaoui (2019-2019)
