= ASI Abengourou =

Ivorian football club

Indenié Abengourou
- Full name: AS Indenié Abengourou
- Founded: 1951
- Ground: Stade Henri Konan Bédié, Abengourou
- Capacity: 3,000
- League: Division 1
- 2025–26: Ligue 2, 13th of 14 in A Group
Home colours	Away colours	Third colours

AS Indenié Abengourou or ASI Abengourou is an Ivorian football club from Abengourou founded in 1951. They were promoted to the highest level of football in Ivory Coast. 3,000 capacity Stade Henri Konan Bédié is their home ground.

== Honours ==
- Côte d'Ivoire Cup
  - Winners (1): 1988
  - Runners-up (1): 2011
- Coupe de la Ligue de Côte d'Ivoire
  - Winners (1): 2017

== Notable players ==
- Willie Britto
- Nanan Houssou
- Oumar Konaté
