= Bouaké FC =

Ivorian football club

Bouaké
- Full name: Bouaké Football Club
- Founded: 2007; 19 years ago
- Ground: Stade de la Paix
- Capacity: 35,000
- Chairman: (Ivory Coast) Seydou Traoré
- President: (Ivory Coast) Oumar Kourouma
- Manager: (Ivory Coast) Amadou Ouattara
- League: Ligue 1
- 2025–26: Ligue 1, 10th of 14
Home colours	Away colours

Bouaké FC is an Ivorian football club based in the city of Bouaké. They are currently a member of the top domestic Ligue 1. The club is managed by Amadou Ouattara.

== Stadium ==
Currently the team plays at the 35,000 capacity Stade Bouaké.
