= Abengourou =

- City, sub-prefecture, and commune
- Nickname: Cité royale de la paix (Royal city of peace)
- Location in Ivory Coast
- Coordinates: 6°44′N 3°29′W
- Country: Ivory Coast
- District: Comoé
- Region: Indénié-Djuablin
- Department: Abengourou

Area
  - Total: 757 km^{2} (292 sq mi)

Population (2021 census)
  - Total: 164,424
  - Density: 217/km^{2} (563/sq mi)
  - City: 100,910
- (2014 census)
- Time zone: UTC+0 (GMT)

Abengourou is a city in eastern Ivory Coast. It is the seat of both Comoé District and Indénié-Djuablin Region. It is also a commune and the seat of and a sub-prefecture of Abengourou Department.

Abengourou is primarily populated by the Anyi ethnic group, a branch of the Akan people who migrated to the region from Ghana. In the 2021 census, the population of the sub-prefecture of Abengourou was 164,424. The city is served by Abengourou Airport. There is also the interior's largest hospital. There is an agricultural vocational training institute, along with a research station that specializes in the local crops of cocoa and coffee. These crops are then transported the 151 kilometres (94 mi) to Abidjan for export.

Within the city is the residence of the Anyi paramount chief, who is also the King of Indénié, a kingdom founded in the 18th century. His home was built in 1882 and is decorated with artifacts.

The name "Abengourou" stems from the Akan language expression "n'pé kro", which means "I don't like long discussions".

The city is home to the Roman Catholic Diocese of Abengourou, with its cathedral at the Cathédrale Sainte Thérèse de l'enfant Jésus.

== Notable people ==
- Roger Assalé (born 13 November 1993), international footballer

In 2014, the population of the sub-prefecture of Abengourou was 135,635.

== Villages ==
The seventeen villages of the sub-prefecture of Abengourou and their population in 2014 are:

1. Abengourou (100 910)
2. Adaou (4 011)
3. Adonikro (795)
4. Adou Koffikro (2 373)
5. Akoikro (492)
6. Apoisso (9 373)
7. Apoueba (1 824)
8. Bossematie (872)
9. Comoekro (253)
10. Dramanekro (1 057)
11. Kirifi (2 364)
12. Kodjinan (5 049)
13. Kouame Bouakro (456)
14. Kouassi Beniekro (850)
15. N'dakro (112)
16. Pokoukro (4 299)
17. Touzoukro (545)
