= Ligue 1 (Ivory Coast) =

Ligue 1 LONACI
- Founded: 1960
- Country: Ivory Coast
- Confederation: CAF
- Number of clubs: 16
- Level on pyramid: 1
- Relegation to: Ligue 2
- Domestic cup(s): Coupe de Côte d'Ivoire de football Coupe Houphouët-Boigny
- International cup(s): Champions League; Confederation Cup
- Current champions: ASEC Mimosas (30) (2025–26)
- Most championships: ASEC Mimosas (30)
- Website: ligue1-ci.com
- Current: 2025–26

The Ivory Coast Ligue 1 LONACI is the top division of the Ivorian Football Federation. It was created in 1960.

== 2024−25 Ligue 1 clubs ==
- AF Amadou Diallo
- ASEC Mimosas
- Bouaké FC
- CO Korhogo
- Denguélé
- Mouna
- FC San Pédro
- LYS FC
- RC Abidjan
- SOA FC
- SOL FC
- Stade d'Abidjan
- SC d'Adjamé

== Qualification for CAF competitions ==
=== Association ranking for the 2025–26 CAF club season ===
The association ranking for the 2025–26 CAF Champions League and the 2025–26 CAF Confederation Cup will be based on results from each CAF club competition from 2020–21 to the 2024–25 season.

Legend

- CL: CAF Champions League
- CC: CAF Confederation Cup
- ≥: Associations points might increase on basis of its clubs performance in 2024–25 CAF club competitions
- Associations ranked 1–12 are eligible to enter two teams in each CAF club competition.

Rank			Association	2020–21 (× 1)		2021–22 (× 2)		2022–23 (× 3)		2023–24 (× 4)		2024–25 (× 5)		Total
2025	2024	Mvt	Association	CL	CC	CL	CC	CL	CC	CL	CC	CL	CC	Total
1	1	—	Egypt	8	3	7	4	8	2.5	7	7	10	4	190.5
2	2	—	Morocco	4	6	9	5	8	2	2	4	5	5	142
3	4	+1	South Africa	8	2	5	4	4	3	4	1.5	9	3	131
4	3	-1	Algeria	6	5	7	1	6	5	2	3	5	5	130
5	6	+1	Tanzania	3	0.5	0	2	3	4	6	0	2	4	82.5
6	5	-1	Tunisia	4	3	5	1	4	2	6	1	3	0.5	82.5
7	8	+1	Angola	1	0	5	0	2	0	3	1.5	2	2	55
8	7	-1	DR Congo	4	0	0	3	1	2	4	0	2	0	45
9	9	—	Sudan	3	0	3	0	3	0	2	0	3	0	41
10	11	+1	Ivory Coast	0	0	0	1	0	3	3	0	1	2	38
11	10	-1	Libya	0	0.5	0	5	0	0.5	0	3	0	0	24
12	12	—	Nigeria	0	2	0	0	0	2	0	2	0	1	21

== Champions ==
- 1956: Africa Sports (Before Independence)
- 1960: Onze Frères de Bassam (1)
- 1961: Onze Frères de Bassam (2)
- 1962: Stade d'Abidjan (1)
- 1963: ASEC Mimosas (1)
- 1964: Stade d'Abidjan (2)
- 1965: Stade d'Abidjan (3)
- 1966: Stade d'Abidjan (4)
- 1967: Africa Sports (1)
- 1968: Africa Sports (2)
- 1969: Stade d'Abidjan (5)
- 1970: ASEC Mimosas (2)
- 1971: Africa Sports (3)
- 1972: ASEC Mimosas (3)
- 1973: ASEC Mimosas (4)
- 1974: ASEC Mimosas (5)
- 1975: ASEC Mimosas (6)
- 1976: SC Gagnoa (1)
- 1977: Africa Sports (4)
- 1978: Africa Sports (5)
- 1979: Stella Club d'Adjamé (1)
- 1980: ASEC Mimosas (7)
- 1981: Stella Club d'Adjamé (2)
- 1982: Africa Sports (6)
- 1983: Africa Sports (7)
- 1984: Stella Club d'Adjamé (3)
- 1985: Africa Sports (8)
- 1986: Africa Sports (9)
- 1987: Africa Sports (10)
- 1988: Africa Sports (11)
- 1989: Africa Sports (12)
- 1990: ASEC Mimosas (8)
- 1991: ASEC Mimosas (9)
- 1992: ASEC Mimosas (10)
- 1993: ASEC Mimosas (11)
- 1994: ASEC Mimosas (12)
- 1995: ASEC Mimosas (13)
- 1996: Africa Sports (13)
- 1997: ASEC Mimosas (14)
- 1998: ASEC Mimosas (15)
- 1999: Africa Sports (14)
- 2000: ASEC Mimosas (16)
- 2001: ASEC Mimosas (17)
- 2002: ASEC Mimosas (18)
- 2003: ASEC Mimosas (19)
- 2004: ASEC Mimosas (20)
- 2005: ASEC Mimosas (21)
- 2006: ASEC Mimosas (22)
- 2007: Africa Sports (15)
- 2008: Africa Sports (16)
- 2009: ASEC Mimosas (23)
- 2010: ASEC Mimosas (24)
- 2011: Africa Sports (17)
- 2012: Séwé Sport (1)
- 2012–13: Séwé Sport (2)
- 2013–14: Séwé Sport (3)
- 2014–15: AS Tanda (1)
- 2015–16: AS Tanda (2)
- 2016–17: ASEC Mimosas (25)
- 2017–18: ASEC Mimosas (26)
- 2018–19: SO de l'Armée (1)
- 2019–20: Racing Club Abidjan (1)
- 2020–21: ASEC Mimosas (27)
- 2021–22: ASEC Mimosas (28)
- 2022–23: ASEC Mimosas (29)
- 2023–24: FC San Pédro (1)
- 2024–25: Stade d'Abidjan (6)
- 2025–26: ASEC Mimosas (30)

== Total ==
Club	Titles	Seasons won
ASEC Mimosas	30	1963, 1970, 1972, 1973, 1974, 1975, 1980, 1990, 1991, 1992, 1993, 1994, 1995, 1997, 1998, 2000, 2001, 2002, 2003, 2004, 2005, 2006, 2009, 2010, 2017, 2018, 2021, 2022, 2023, 2026
Africa Sports	18	1956, 1967, 1968, 1971, 1977, 1978, 1982, 1983, 1985, 1986, 1987, 1988, 1989, 1996, 1999, 2007, 2008, 2011
Stade d'Abidjan	6	1962, 1963, 1965, 1966, 1969, 2025
Stella Club d'Adjamé	3	1979, 1981, 1984
Séwé Sport	3	2012, 2013, 2014
Onze Frères de Bassam	2	1960, 1961
AS Tanda	2	2015, 2016
SC Gagnoa	1	1976
SO de l'Armée	1	2019
Racing Club Abidjan	1	2020

== Top goalscorers ==
Year	Top scorers	Club	Goals
1992	(Ivory Coast) Abdoulaye Traoré	ASEC Mimosas	11
1993	(Ivory Coast) Ahmed Ouattara	Africa Sports	13
1994	(Ivory Coast) Abdoulaye Traoré	ASEC Mimosas	9
1995	(Nigeria) John Zaki	ASEC Mimosas	9
1996	(Nigeria) Ibe Johnson	Africa Sports	15
1997	(Ivory Coast) Tchiressoua Guel	ASEC Mimosas	10
1998	(Ivory Coast) Elo Lokpo	SO Armée	12
1999	(Ivory Coast) Aruna Dindane	ASEC Mimosas	13
2000	(Ivory Coast) Habib Tiéhi	Stade d'Abidjan	10
2001	(Ivory Coast) Jean-Marc Benie	Stella Club d'Adjamé	20
2002	(Ivory Coast) Antonin Koutouan	ASEC Mimosas	10
2003			
2004'	(Ivory Coast) Abdramane Diaby	Sabé Sports	13
2005	(Ivory Coast) Seydou Doumbia	AS Denguélé	15
2006	(Ivory Coast) Didier Ya Konan	ASEC Mimosas	11
2007	(Ivory Coast) Lébry Ouraga	ES Bingerville	16
2008	(Ivory Coast) Gohi Bi Zoro Cyriac	ASEC Mimosas	21
2009			
2010	(Ivory Coast) Adama Bakayoko	Sabé Sports	15
2011	(Ivory Coast) Kévin Zougoula	Séwé Sport	11
2012			
2012–13	(Ivory Coast) Kévin Zougoula	Séwé Sport	13
2013–14	(Ivory Coast) Koffi Boua	ASEC Mimosas	13
2014–15	(Ivory Coast) Vakoun Issouf Bayo	Stade d'Abidjan	13
2015–16	(Ivory Coast) Wilfried Yessoh	AS Denguélé	17
2016–17	(Burkina Faso) Aristide Bancé	ASEC Mimosas	13
2017–18	(Ivory Coast) William Togui	SC Gagnoa	23
2018–19	(Ivory Coast) Mohamed Sylla	SC Gagnoa	13
2019–20	(Ivory Coast) Aboubacar Doumbia	SO Armée	10
2020–21	(Mali) Seydou Traoré	RC Abidjan	8
2022–23	(Ivory Coast) Gautier Diby	San Pédro	14
2023–24	Abdoulaye Kanté	Racing Club	15
2023–24	(Ivory Coast) Stéphane Bedi	San Pedro	15

== Records ==
ASEC Mimosas holds the world record for unbeaten games, playing 108 domestic league and cup matches without defeat between 1989 and 1994. This streak ended on 19.June 1994 when ASEC lost 1–2 against SO Armée in an Ivorian League fixture.
