= CO Korhogo =

Association football club in Ivory Coast

- Full name: Club Omnisports de Korhogo
- Short name: COK
- Founded: 1988
- Stadium: Stade Amadou Gon Coulibaly
- Capacity: 20,000
- Chairman: Bakary Ouattara
- Manager: Ignace Nabaloom
- League: Côte d'Ivoire Premier Division
- 2025–26: Côte d'Ivoire Premier Division, 9th
- Website: clubomnisportkorhogo.com
Home colours	Away colours

The Club Omnisports de Korhogo (CO Korhogo) is an Ivorian professional football club based in Korhogo. Currently, the club plays in the Côte d'Ivoire Premier Division.

== Notable former players ==
- Ahmed Fofana
- Christ Tapé
