= SC Gagnoa =

Ivorian football club

- Full name: Sporting Club de Gagnoa
- Nickname: Les Gagnolais
- Founded: 1960
- Ground: Stade Victor Biaka Boda; Gagnoa
- Capacity: 15,000
- President: Yssouf Diabaté
- Manager: Soualiho Haïdara
- League: Ligue 2
- 2025–26: Ligue 2, Group B, 4th of 14
Home colours	Away colours

Sporting Club de Gagnoa, commonly known as SC Gagnoa, is an Ivorian football club. They were promoted to the highest level of football in Ivory Coast. The football club is based in the city of Gagnoa. Stade de Mama is their home stadium. It has a 5,000 capacity.

== Honours ==
- Ivorian Ligue 1
  - Champions (1): 1976
- Coupe de Côte d'Ivoire
  - Runners-up (7): 1971, 1975, 1978, 1979, 1984, 1985, 1990
- Coupe Houphouët-Boigny
  - Champions (2): 1976, 1978

== Performance in CAF competitions ==
- African Cup of Champions Clubs / CAF Champions League: 1 appearance

1977 – Second round

- CAF Confederation Cup: 2 appearances

2016 – First round
2017 – First round

- CAF Cup: 1 appearance

1992 – Quarter-finals

- African Cup Winners' Cup: 3 appearances

1979 – Second round
1986 – First round
1991 – Second round
