= SOA (football) =

Association football club in Ivory Coast

- Full name: Société Omnisport de l'Armée Football
- Nicknames: S.O.A. Les Militaires (The Military people)
- Founded: 1932; 94 years ago
- Ground: Stade Charles Konan Banny
- Capacity: 20,000
- Chairman: Julien N'Dri Kouamé; Philippe Mangou
- Manager: Lanciné Pereira Koné
- League: Ligue 1
- 2025–26: 11th of 16
Home colours	Away colours

Société Omnisports de l'Armée, commonly known as SOA, is an Ivorian professional football club based in Yamoussoukro. The club is a member of the Ivorian Football Federation Premiere Division. They play at the Stade Charles Konan Banny.

== Current squad ==
Note: Flags indicate national team as defined under FIFA eligibility rules; some limited exceptions apply. Players may hold more than one non-FIFA nationality.

No.	Pos.	Nation	Player
1	GK	CIV	Abdoul Mohamed Ouattara
2	MF	CIV	Simon Kangoh
3	DF	RWA	Jean-Baptiste Kaboré
4	MF	CIV	Parfait Konan Kouakou
5	DF	CIV	Youba Koné
6	DF	CIV	Abdoul Coulibaly
7	DF	CIV	Cheick Hibrahim Bokoum
8	MF	CIV	Ibrahim Sylla
9	FW	CIV	Vieron Rémi Gabiem
10	MF	CIV	Alassane Karamoko
11	MF	CIV	Pierre M'Bena
12	FW	CIV	Dosso Gouaméné
13	DF	CIV	Gnagrah Assié
14	FW	CIV	Issouf Sangaré
15	MF	CIV	Magloire Désiré Kouamé
16	GK	CIV	Namory Diomandé

No.	Pos.	Nation	Player
17	MF	CIV	Adama Hamed Diomandé
18	MF	CIV	Malan Richard N'Goran
19	MF	CIV	Yao Mathieu Kouamé
20	MF	RWA	Anselme Gnahoré
21	MF	CIV	Oumar Diallo
22	GK	CIV	Guyan Kanté
23	DF	CIV	Harouna Toe
24	MF	BFA	Djomagan Fofana
25	FW	CIV	Kouassi Auguste Konan
26	DF	CIV	Lamine Diakité
27	DF	CIV	Manfah Soumahoro
28	DF	CIV	Nick Olivier Blékou Yohoré
29	MF	CIV	Aboubakar Sidiki Diaby
30	FW	CIV	Mamadou Koné
—	MF	CIV	Christian Nougbélé

== Honours ==
- Côte d'Ivoire Premier Division
  - Champions: 2018–19
- Côte d'Ivoire Cup
  - Winners: 1996
  - Runners-up: 2006
- Coupe de la Ligue de Côte d'Ivoire
  - Winners: 2014
- Félix Houphouët-Boigny Cup
  - Winners: 1996, 2019

== Performance in CAF competitions ==
- CAF Champions League: 1 appearance

2020 – Preliminary Round

- CAF Confederation Cup: 1 appearance

2009 – First Round

- CAF Cup Winners' Cup: 4 appearances

1997 – quarter-finals

- CAF Super Cup: 0 appearance

== Miscellaneous ==
On 19.June 1994, SO Armee played 2:1 in the Ivorian league against ASEC, thus ending ASEC's world record unbeaten streak of 108 league and domestic cup games between 1989 and 1994.
