= Academie de Foot Amadou Diallo =

Ivorian football club

AFAD
- Full name: Académie de Football Amadou Diallo de Djékanou
- Founded: 27 June 2005 (as Association Sportive Pythagore)
- Ground: Stade Robert Champroux; Abidjan, Ivory Coast
- Capacity: 5,000
- Chairman: Philippe N'Dri
- Manager: Maxime Gouaméné
- League: Ligue 1
- 2025–26: Ligue 1, 3rd
- Website: www.afad.ci
Home colours	Away colours

Academie de Foot Amadou Diallo de Djékanou also known as AFAD Djékanou is an Ivorian professional football club based in Abidjan.

== Honours ==
- Côte d'Ivoire Premier Division
  - Runners-up (2): 2011, 2012
- Coupe de la Ligue de Côte d'Ivoire
  - Winners (1): 2018

== Performance in CAF competitions ==
- CAF Champions League: 2 appearances

2012 – Second Round
2013 – First Round

- CAF Confederation Cup: 1 appearance

2012 – Round of 16
