= 2012–13 Ligue 1 (Ivory Coast) =

Ligue 1
- Season: 2012–13
- Matches: 92
- Top goalscorer: Koelly Kévin Zougoula (9 goals)
- Biggest home win: Denguélé 4-0 ESB; Séwé 4-0 EFYM
- Biggest away win: Africa Sports 1-4 SC Gagnoa; ESB 1-4 Africa Sports
- Highest scoring: ESB 4-2 CO Korhogo; Djékanou 3-3 Denguélé

The 2012-13 Ligue 1 season was the 55th edition and current of the top-tier competition of Côte d'Ivoire football.

The season will start on 2 November 2012 and be in play until 31 July 2013.

The Ivoirian Ligue 1 is back to its 2010 formula, consisting of a single group of fourteen teams, after it followed a revised format for two seasons following political problems in the country.

== Team movement ==
=== Relegated from 2011 Ligue 1 ===
- Issia Wazi FC
- ASC Ouragahio

=== Promoted to 2012-13 Ligue 1 ===
- CO Korhogo
- SC Gagnoa

== Teams ==
Locations of the 2012–13 Ligue 1 teams

Club	Town
Academie de Foot Amadou Diallo	Djékanou
Africa Sports National	Abidjan
AS Indenié	Abengourou
ASEC Mimosas	Abidjan
CO Korhogo	Korhogo
Denguelé Sports d'Odienné	Odienné
EF Yéo Martial	Abidjan
ES Bingerville	Bingerville
Jeunesse Club d'Abidjan	Abidjan
Séwé Sports de San Pedro	San Pédro
Société Omnisports de l'Armée	Yamoussoukro
Sporting Club de Gagnoa	Gagnoa
Stella Club d'Adjamé	Abidjan
USC Bassam	Grand-Bassam

== Table ==
Pos	Team	Pld	W	D	L	GF	GA	GD	Pts	Qualification or relegation
1	Séwé Sport	16	10	2	4	23	10	+13	32	Qualification for 2014 CAF Champions League
2	AFAD Djékanou	16	8	6	2	20	7	+13	30	Qualification for 2014 CAF Champions League
3	AS Denguélé	16	6	8	2	21	14	+7	26	Qualification for 2014 CAF Confederation Cup
4	Sporting Club de Gagnoa	16	7	5	4	21	15	+6	26	
5	ASEC Mimosas	16	7	5	4	21	18	+3	26	
6	Jeunesse Club d'Abidjan	16	6	5	5	19	17	+2	23	
7	Africa Sports	16	6	5	5	19	19	0	23	
8	Stella Club d'Adjamé	16	5	5	6	16	14	+2	20	
9	AS Indenié Abengourou	16	4	7	5	13	16	−3	19	
10	S.O.A.	16	3	8	5	13	15	−2	17	
11	USC Bassam	16	3	7	6	14	19	−5	16	
12	CO Korhogo	16	3	7	6	10	15	−5	16	
13	EF Yéo Martial (R)	16	2	6	8	10	24	−14	12	Relegation to Deuxieme Division
14	ES Bingerville (R)	16	2	5	9	14	31	−17	11	Relegation to Deuxieme Division

Updated to match(es) played on 27 March 2013. Source: Ligue 1 Côte d'Ivoire Soccerway.com
Rules for classification: 1) points; 2) goal difference; 3) number of goals scored.
(R) Relegated

== See also ==
- Ligue 1 (Côte d'Ivoire)
- MTN
