= 2008 Côte d'Ivoire Premier Division =

Côte d'Ivoire Premier Division
- Season: 2008
- Champions: Africa Sports National
- 2009 CAF Champions League: Africa Sports National; ASEC Mimosas
- 2009 CAF Confederation Cup: Société Omnisports de l'Armée; Jeunesse Club d'Abidjan

The 2008 Côte d'Ivoire Premier Division season was the 48th of the competition. The season took place between 24 February and 23 November 2008. The league was composed of fourteen teams, playing a double round-robin tournament with weekly games, except for certain dates reserved by FIFA to allow players to represent their country. Africa Sports National were the defending champions, having won their fifteenth league title during the previous season.

During the season, three games were abandoned, two due to crowd troubles, and one due to forfeit. All three games were ruled as two goal wins for the visiting team, and five goal defeats to the receiving team.

On 23 November 2008, Africa Sports National beat RC Dalona on the final matchday of the season, thus meaning that Africa Sports National retained the trophy, winning the Ivory Coast Ligue 1 for the sixteenth time of their history. On the other hand, RC Dalona and SC Gagona were relegated to the Ivory Coast Ligue 2. The competition's top goalscorer was ASEC Mimosas player Gohi Bi Zoro Cyriac who scored 21 goals.

== Teams ==
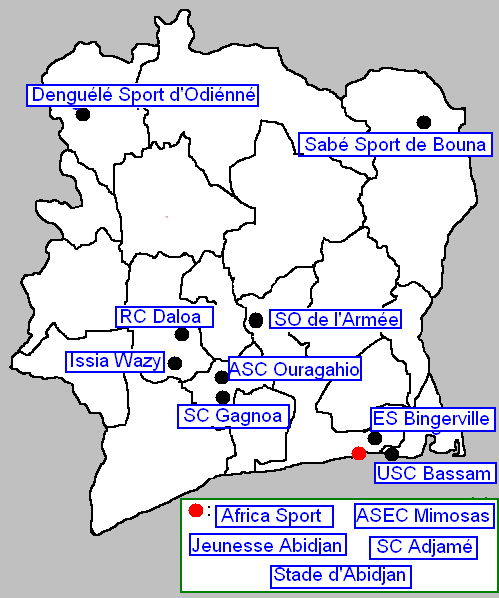

Club	Town
Africa Sports National	Abidjan
ASEC Mimosas	Abidjan
ASC Ouragahio	Ouragahio
Denguelé Sports d'Odienné	Odienné
Entente Sportive de Bingerville	Bingerville
Issia Wazi	Issia
Jeunesse Club d'Abidjan	Abidjan
Société Omnisports de l'Armée	Yamoussoukro
Réveil Club de Daloa	Daloa
Sabé Sports de Bouna	Bouna
Sporting Club de Gagnoa	Gagnoa
Stade d'Abidjan	Abidjan
Stella Club d'Adjamé	Abidjan
USC Bassam	Grand-Bassam

== Table ==
Pos	Team	Pld	W	D	L	GF	GA	GD	Pts	Qualification or relegation
1	Africa Sports National (C)	26	15	7	4	41	19	+22	52	Qualifies for the 2009 CAF Champions League
2	ASEC Mimosas	26	13	12	1	46	17	+29	51	Qualifies for the 2009 CAF Champions League
3	SO Armée	26	12	10	4	31	15	+16	46	Qualifies for the 2009 CAF Confederation Cup
4	USC Bassam	26	11	8	7	31	23	+8	41	
5	Sabé de Bouna	26	10	9	7	26	27	−1	39	
6	Jeunesse Club d'Abidjan	26	11	5	10	24	22	+2	38	Qualifies for the 2009 CAF Confederation Cup
7	Stella Club d'Adjamé	26	9	9	8	28	31	−3	36	
8	Stade d'Abidjan	26	10	4	12	29	31	−2	34	
9	Denguelé Sports d'Odienné	26	9	4	13	38	37	+1	31	
10	Issia Wazi	26	7	10	9	25	25	0	31	
11	Entente Sportive de Bingerville	26	7	8	11	20	31	−11	29	
12	ASC Ouragahio	26	8	5	13	22	39	−17	29	
13	Sporting Club de Gagnoa (R)	26	4	7	15	15	43	−28	19	Relegation to the Deuxieme Division
14	Réveil Club de Daloa (R)	26	3	8	15	19	44	−25	17	Relegation to the Deuxieme Division

Source: rsssf
(C) Champions; (R) Relegated

== Top goalscorer ==
- Zoro Cyriac Gohi Bi (ASEC Mimosas) 21 goals
