= 2010 Côte d'Ivoire Premier Division =

Côte d'Ivoire Premier Division
- Season: 2010
- Champions: ASEC Mimosas
- Relegated: Sabé Sports de Bouna; FC Hiré
- 2011 CAF Champions League: ASEC Mimosas; Jeunesse Club d'Abidjan
- 2011 CAF Confederation Cup: Séwé Sports de San Pedro; Africa Sports National (cup winner)

The 2010 Côte d'Ivoire Premier Division season was the 50th edition and current of the top-tier competition of Côte d'Ivoire football. The season began on 17 January 2010 and concluded on 5 November 2010. ASEC Mimosas successfully defended their title and captured their 2nd consecutive championship.

== Team movement ==
=== Relegated from 2009 Côte d'Ivoire Premier Division ===
- Ecole de Football Yéo Martial
- Entente Sportive de Bingerville

=== Promoted to 2010 Côte d'Ivoire Premier Division ===
- FC Hiré
- Academie de Football Amadou Diallo

== Teams ==
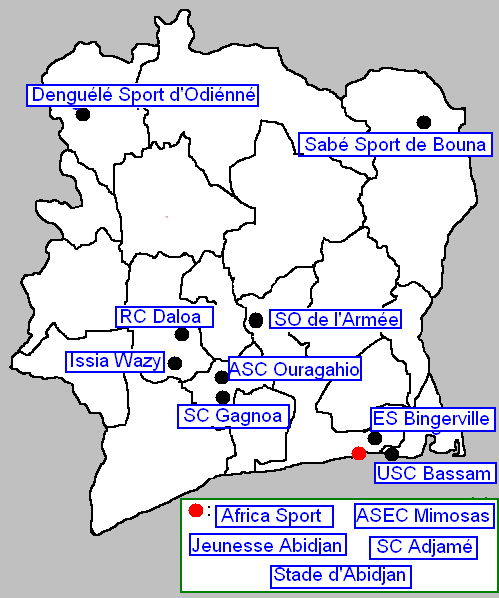

| Club | Town |
|---|---|
| AFAD | Amadou |
| Africa Sports National | Abidjan |
| ASEC Mimosas | Abidjan |
| ASC Ouragahio | Ouragahio |
| Denguelé Sports d'Odienné | Odienné |
| FC Hiré | Hiré |
| Issia Wazi | Issia |
| Jeunesse Club d'Abidjan | Abidjan |
| Société Omnisports de l'Armée | Yamoussoukro |
| Sabé Sports de Bouna | Bouna |
| Séwé Sports de San Pedro | San Pedro |
| Stade d'Abidjan | Abidjan |
| Stella Club d'Adjamé | Abidjan |
| USC Bassam | Grand-Bassam |

== Table ==
| Pos | Team | Pld | W | D | L | GF | GA | GD | Pts | Qualification or relegation |
|---|---|---|---|---|---|---|---|---|---|---|
| 1 | ASEC Mimosas (C) | 26 | 13 | 9 | 4 | 41 | 14 | +27 | 48 | Qualification for 2011 CAF Champions League |
| 2 | Jeunesse Club d'Abidjan | 26 | 11 | 8 | 7 | 30 | 20 | +10 | 41 | Qualification for 2011 CAF Champions League |
| 3 | Séwé Sports de San Pedro | 26 | 11 | 7 | 8 | 27 | 20 | +7 | 40 | Qualification for 2011 CAF Confederation Cup |
| 4 | Société Omnisports de l'Armée | 26 | 10 | 8 | 8 | 29 | 24 | +5 | 38 | |
| 5 | Stella Club d'Adjamé | 26 | 10 | 8 | 8 | 26 | 25 | +1 | 38 | |
| 6 | Academie de Football Amadou Diallo | 26 | 8 | 12 | 6 | 21 | 18 | +3 | 36 | |
| 7 | Issia Wazi | 26 | 9 | 9 | 8 | 27 | 31 | −4 | 36 | |
| 8 | Africa Sports National | 26 | 9 | 8 | 9 | 16 | 17 | −1 | 35 | Qualification for 2011 CAF Confederation Cup |
| 9 | USC Bassam | 26 | 10 | 4 | 12 | 24 | 30 | −6 | 34 | |
| 10 | Denguelé Sports d'Odienné | 26 | 9 | 6 | 11 | 28 | 24 | +4 | 33 | |
| 11 | ASC Ouragahio | 26 | 8 | 9 | 9 | 30 | 32 | −2 | 33 | |
| 12 | Stade d'Abidjan | 26 | 9 | 5 | 12 | 20 | 32 | −12 | 32 | |
| 13 | Sabé Sports de Bouna (R) | 26 | 8 | 5 | 13 | 29 | 38 | −9 | 29 | Relegation to Deuxieme Division |
| 14 | FC Hiré (R) | 26 | 4 | 7 | 15 | 26 | 49 | −23 | 19 | Relegation to Deuxieme Division |

Updated to match(es) played on 9 November 2010. Source: Soccerway.com
Rules for classification: 1) points; 2) goal difference; 3) number of goals scored.
(C) Champions; (R) Relegated
