= 2009 Côte d'Ivoire Premier Division =

Côte d'Ivoire Premier Division
- Season: 2009
- Champions: Africa Sports National
- Relegated: Ecole de Football Yéo Martial; Entente Sportive de Bingerville
- 2010 CAF Champions League: ASEC Mimosas; Africa Sports National
- 2010 CAF Confederation Cup: Séwé Sports de San Pedro; Issia Wazi

The 2009 Côte d'Ivoire Premier Division season was the 49th edition of the top-tier competition of Côte d'Ivoire football. The season concluded on the 1 November 2009. ASEC Mimosas were crowned as the Champions for 22nd time in their history.

== Teams ==
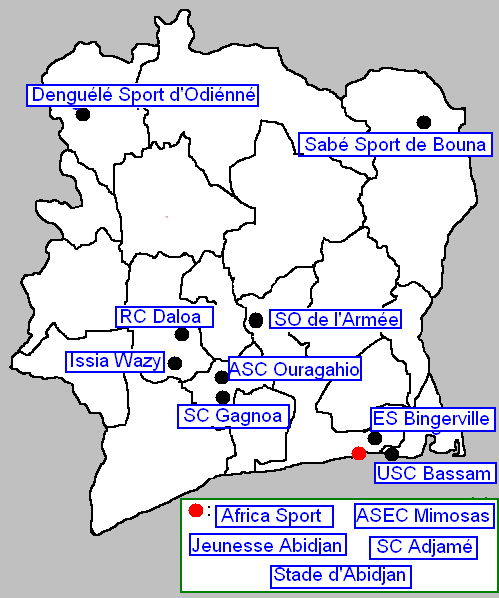

Club	Town
Africa Sports National	Abidjan
ASEC Mimosas	Abidjan
ASC Ouragahio	Ouragahio
Denguelé Sports d'Odienné	Odienné
Ecole de Football Yéo Martial	Abidjan
Entente Sportive de Bingerville	Bingerville
Issia Wazi	Issia
Jeunesse Club d'Abidjan	Abidjan
Société Omnisports de l'Armée	Yamoussoukro
Sabé Sports de Bouna	Bouna
Séwé Sports de San Pedro	San Pedro
Stade d'Abidjan	Abidjan
Stella Club d'Adjamé	Abidjan
USC Bassam	Grand-Bassam

== Table ==
Pos	Team	Pld	W	D	L	GF	GA	GD	Pts	Qualification or relegation
1	ASEC Mimosas (C)	26	16	8	2	40	10	+30	56	Qualification for 2010 CAF Champions League
2	Africa Sports National	26	14	6	6	39	18	+21	48	Qualification for 2010 CAF Champions League
3	Séwé Sports de San Pedro	26	14	5	7	30	19	+11	47	Qualification for 2010 CAF Confederation Cup
4	Issia Wazi	26	12	7	7	25	23	+2	43	Qualification for 2010 CAF Confederation Cup
5	Jeunesse Club d'Abidjan	26	9	12	5	25	15	+10	39	
6	Stella Club d'Adjamé	26	11	6	9	27	27	0	39	
7	Stade d'Abidjan	26	9	10	7	23	19	+4	37	
8	ASC Ouragahio	26	8	6	12	17	26	−9	30	
9	USC Bassam	26	4	15	7	24	23	+1	27	
10	Société Omnisports de l'Armée	26	6	9	11	23	30	−7	27	
11	Sabé Sports de Bouna	26	6	8	12	26	34	−8	26	
12	Denguelé Sports d'Odienné	26	5	11	10	12	25	−13	26	
13	Ecole de Football Yéo Martial (R)	26	6	7	13	21	41	−20	25	Relegation to Deuxieme Division
14	Entente Sportive de Bingerville (R)	26	2	10	14	17	39	−22	16	Relegation to Deuxieme Division

Source: Soccerway.com
Rules for classification: 1) points; 2) goal difference; 3) number of goals scored.
(C) Champions; (R) Relegated
