= List of football stadiums in Ivory Coast =

This is a list of football (soccer) stadiums in Ivory Coast, ranked in descending order of capacity with at least 5,000 seating capacity. Some stadiums in the country are football-specific while others are multi-purpose stadiums.

== Current stadiums ==
| # | Images | Stadium | City | Capacity | Home team(s) |
|---|---|---|---|---|---|
| 1 | | Alassane Ouattara Stadium | Abidjan | 60,000 | National team |
| 2 | | Stade de la Paix | Bouaké | 40,000 | Bouaké FC |
| 3 | | Felix Houphouet Boigny Stadium | Abidjan | 33,000 | ASEC Mimosas |
| 4 | | Charles Konan Banny Stadium | Yamoussoukro | 20,000 | SO de l'Armée |
| 5 | | Laurent Pokou Stadium | San-Pédro | 20,000 | FC San Pédro |
| 6 | | Amadou Gon Coulibaly Stadium | Korhogo | 20,000 | National team |
| 7 | | Stade Municipal d'Abidjan | Abidjan | 10,000 | Stade d'Abidjan |
| 8 | | Stade Municipal Bouna | Bouna | 10,000 | Sabé Sports de Bouna |
| 9 | | Robert Champroux Stadium | Marcory | 10,000 | Jeunesse Club d'Abidjan; Stella Club d'Adjamé |
| 10 | | Stade Auguste Denise (Stade Municipal) | San Pédro | 8,000 | Séwé; San Pédro |

== See also ==
- List of association football stadiums by capacity
- List of African stadiums by capacity
- Lists of stadiums
