= 2024–25 Ligue 1 (Ivory Coast) =

75th season of Ivory Coast Ligue 1

Ligue 1
- Season: 2024–25
- Goals: 234

The 2024–25 Ligue 1 is the 75th season of the top-flight football league in Ivory Coast.

== Teams ==
=== Locations and stadia ===
Locations of the 2024–25 Ligue 1 teams

Team	Location	Stadium	Capacity
AFAD	Abidjan	Stade Municipal d'Abidjan	20,000
Bouaké	Bouaké	Stade de la Paix	40,000
Denguélé	Odienné	Stade El-Hadj-Mamadou-Coulibaly	3,000
Korhogo	Korhogo	Amadou Gon Coulibaly Stadium	20,000
LYS Sassandra	Abidjan	Robert Champroux Stadium	10,000
Mimosas	Abidjan	Robert Champroux Stadium	10,000
Mouna	Akoupé		
RC Abidjan	Abidjan	Robert Champroux Stadium	10,000
San Pédro	San Pédro	Stade Laurent Pokou	20,000
SOA	Yamoussoukro	Charles Konan Banny Stadium	20,000
SOL	Abidjan	Robert Champroux Stadium	10,000
Stade d'Abidjan	Abidjan	Robert Champroux Stadium	10,000
Stella	Abidjan	Robert Champroux Stadium	10,000

== League table ==
Pos	Team	Pld	W	D	L	GF	GA	GD	Pts	Qualification or relegation
1	Stade d'Abidjan (C)	30	19	5	6	47	26	+21	62	Qualification for the CAF Champions League
2	Mimosas	30	17	8	5	46	21	+25	59	Qualification for the CAF Champions League
3	AFAD	30	16	7	7	38	24	+14	55	Qualification for the CAF Confederation Cup
4	San Pédro	30	14	3	13	49	33	+16	45	
5	Stella Club	30	10	12	8	25	24	+1	42	
6	SOA	30	10	10	10	28	28	0	40	
7	Bouaké	30	9	12	9	23	25	−2	39	
8	Mouna	30	9	11	10	35	36	−1	38	
9	Zoman	30	8	13	9	34	38	−4	37	
10	Korhogo	30	8	12	10	32	38	−6	36	
11	ISCA	30	9	9	12	23	31	−8	36	
12	RC Abidjan	30	9	9	12	29	38	−9	36	
13	SOL	30	9	8	13	34	41	−7	35	
14	OSA	30	7	12	11	26	36	−10	33	
15	LYS Sassandra (R)	30	6	10	14	20	34	−14	28	Relegation to Ligue 2
16	Denguélé (R)	30	6	7	17	24	40	−16	25	Relegation to Ligue 2

Source: Soccerway
Rules for classification: 1) points; 2) goal difference; 3) number of goals scored.
(C) Champions; (R) Relegated

== Results ==
Home \ Away	AFA	BOU	DEN	ISC	KOR	LYS	MIM	MOU	OSA	RCA	SAN	SOA	SOL	STA	STE	ZOM
AFAD	—	3–2	2–0		1–0	0–0	2–0	0–1	0–0	0–1	2–1		2–3	1–3		
Bouaké	0–0	—	1–0	1–1	0–0	2–0	0–0	0–1		0–0	0–6	1–3		0–1	1–0	
Denguélé		0–0	—	0–1	1–0	2–0			0–1	4–1	0–1	3–1	1–1	1–0		1–2
ISCA	2–1			—	1–1	2–0		2–1	0–1	1–0	0–2	0–1	1–2	0–3		1–1
Korhogo	0–1	0–0	3–1		—	0–0	1–1	1–1	1–1		0–5	0–2	1–1	2–2	1–4	
LYS Sassandra		1–0	1–0	0–1		—		1–1		0–1	1–2	0–0	0–1	1–4	1–1	1–1
Mimosas	1–2		2–0	1–1	3–1	2–0	—	1–1	1–0			3–1	3–1	0–1	1–0	3–1
Mouna	0–2	1–1	1–1	1–1		1–2		—	2–0	2–0	2–1	0–1			0–1	1–2
OSA	1–1	0–0	3–1	1–2	0–2	0–0	0–5		—					2–3	0–1	1–1
RC Abidjan	1–2			0–1	1–0		1–2		0–0	—	0–3	0–0	1–5	0–1	3–0	1–1
San Pédro	2–3			0–0	1–3	1–2	0–1	0–1	2–1		—	4–1		4–0		
SOA	0–2	1–1	0–1	2–0				1–2	0–0	1–1		—	3–0	0–2	1–2	1–1
SOL		0–2			0–1	1–0	1–1	1–2	2–2		0–1		—	1–4	1–1	1–0
Stade d'Abidjan		0–2	1–0					1–1	2–1	1–2	1–0	0–1	1–0	—	0–0	3–2
Stella Club	0–1		1–1	2–1		0–0	0–0	1–1	0–2	1–1	1–0		1–1		—	0–1
Zoman		1–0			1–2	0–3	1–0		1–1	2–1	4–1		1–1		1–1	—

Updated to match(es) played on 17 April 2025. Source: Soccerway
Legend: Blue = home team win; Yellow = draw; Red = away team win.
For upcoming matches, an "a" indicates there is an article about the rivalry between the two participants.
