= Kévin Zougoula =

Ivorian footballer

Personal information
- Full name: Koelly Kévin Zougoula
- Date of birth: 20 April 1988 (age 38)
- Place of birth: Gouifla, Vavoua, Ivory Coast
- Height: 1.66 m (5 ft 5 in)
- Position: Forward

Team information
- Current team: Séwé Sports

Youth career
- 2004: Sylla et Frères
- 2004–2007: Sabé Sports
- 2007–2008: AS AGIR

Senior career*
| Years | Team | Apps | (Gls) |
| 2008–2010 | AS AGIR | | |
| 2010–2011 | Ouragahio | | (14) |
| 2011–2013 | Séwé Sports | | (39) |
| 2013 | Dinamo București | 5 | (0) |
| 2014– | Séwé Sports | 177 | (87) |

International career
| 2013 | Ivory Coast | 2 | (2) |
- * Club domestic league appearances and goals as of 19 August 2015

Koelly Kévin Zougoula commonly known as Kévin Zougoula (born 20 April 1988) is an Ivorian professional football player. Zougoula was the top scorer of the Côte d'Ivoire Ligue 1 in consecutive seasons in 2011 and 2012.

== Career ==
=== Early career ===
Zougoula first club was Centre de formation Sylla et Frères of Adjamé. He then joined Sabé Sports de Bouna, which was at the Côte d'Ivoire first division at the time. In 2007, he was signed for lower league side AS AGIR of Guibéroua.

=== Guibéroua ===
At this club Zougoula won the competition and became topscorer of Ligue 2 twice.

=== Ouragahio ===
In 2010, Ouragahio signed him and he netted 14 goals with the club and finished 2nd Division topscorer.

=== Séwé Sports ===
A year later in 2011, he was called to Séwé Sports de San Pédro by Séwé Sports president Eugène-Marie Diomande to play for the club. With the club he netted 11 goals with his first season with the club, and became topscorer that year also, he also won the first Ligue 1 title in history for Séwé Sports de San Pédro.

On 16 July 2011, Zougoula scored his first goal against Société Omnisports de l'Armée in a 1–1 draw on the seventh matchday of the 2010 Ligue 1 season at Stade de Yamoussoukro in Yamoussoukro. On 12 March 2012, during the sixteenth matchday of Ligue 1 scored the first goal of a 2–0 win against ASEC Mimosas at Robert Champroux de Marcory Stadium. On 27 July 2012, during Séwé's 2012 Coupe de Côte d'Ivoire de football semi-final with Société Omnisports de l'Armée, Zougoula scored Séwé's last in a 3–1 win to send them to the final against Stella Club d'Adjamé. At that final they lost against Stella Club d'Adjamé 1–0. On 31 October 2012, Zougoula scored Séwé's third in a 4–0 win against Stella Club d'Adjamé to win their first Ivorian Super Cup. On 19 August 2012, on the seventh matchday, he scored the only goal against AFAD by using his head to blast it through AFAD keeper Clovis Tahourou's net.

In October 2012, after the 2012 Ligue 1 season he netted 13 goals and also became the topscorer of Ligue 1. That year he also won the Ballon d'Or of Ivoirian Football and Ligue 1 best forward. On 16 March 2013, Zougoula scored the third goal against Al-Hilal in the first qualifying round of the CAF Champions League.

=== Dinamo București ===
On 28 August 2013 Dinamo București confirmed the arrival of Ivorian Zougoula from Séwé Sport on a 3-year contract.

On 7 September 2013, Zougoula made his debut for Dinamo in a friendly against Shakhtar Donetsk. On 9 September 2013, Zougoula made another appearance for Dinamo in another friendly against Concordia Chiajna and scored in a 3–2 win.

His first official game for Dinamo was played in Cupa României, against Sănătatea Cluj. Zougoula scored twice in that game.

He made his debut in Liga I on 20 October 2013, when he appeared as a substitute in a game against Astra Giurgiu.

At the end of 2013, he ended mutually his contract with Dinamo.

In 2012 for Sewe Sports Zougoula scored 12 goals in 20 games. He also scored 5 in the African Champions League in 4 games. He has been widely regarded as one of the best ivorian strikers and still the stats are still not known he has scored many goals.

== International career ==
In February 2011, played for Ivory Coast A' or the Ivory Coast B team at the 2011 African Nations Championship in Sudan. Ivory Coast B were eliminated in the group stage of the tournament and Zougoula did not get on the scoresheet.

=== International goals ===
Scores and results list Ivory Coast's goal tally first.

| No | Date | Venue | Opponent | Score | Result | Competition |
|---|---|---|---|---|---|---|
| 1. | 27 July 2013 | Stade Robert Champroux, Abidjan, Ivory Coast | Nigeria | 1–0 | 2–0 | 2014 African Nations Championship qualification |
| 2. | 27 July 2013 | Stade Robert Champroux, Abidjan, Ivory Coast | Nigeria | 2–0 | 2–0 | 2014 African Nations Championship qualification |

== Personal life ==
Zougoula stated that Olympique de Marseille of France has been always been his favourite club and that he hopes to play at the club one day.

== Honours ==
=== Club Honours ===
Séwé Sports

- Ligue 1: (3)

2012, 2013, 2014

- Coupe Houphouët-Boigny: (1)

2012

=== Individual honours ===
Ouragahio

- Ligue 2 Meilleur buteur: (1)

2010

Séwé Sports

- Ligue 1 Meilleur buteur: (3)

2011, 2012, 2013

- Ivorian Football Federation Ballon D'Or: (1)

2012
