= Didier Tayou =

Cameroonian footballer

Personal information
- Date of birth: 31 December 1988 (age 37)
- Place of birth: Douala, Cameroon
- Height: 1.75 m (5 ft 9 in)
- Position: Forward

Youth career
- 1995–2000: Podium Douala
- 2001–2002: Kakadel Defale

Senior career*
Years	Team	Apps	(Gls)
2002–2004	Mogas 90 Cotonou		
2005–2006	Energie Cotonou		
2007	AS Denguélé		
2007	Stade d'Abidjan		
2008	Stella Club d'Adjamé		
2008–2011	Olympique du Kef		
2011	→ Najran SC (loan)		
2012–2013	Sloboda Užice	2	(0)
2013–2014	Mqabba		
2014	AC Oulu	6	(1)
2015	Victoria Hotspurs	1	(0)
- * Club domestic league appearances and goals as of 1 January 2015

Didier Tayou (born 31 December 1988) is a Cameroonian former professional footballer who played as a forward.

== Career ==
Born in Douala, he began his career with Podium Douala in 1995. In 2001, he moved to Togo, where he joined Kakadel de Defale. In 2002, he moved to Benin, where he joined Mogas 90 FC, and became the Benin Premier League vice-champion, winning the Benin Cup in 2003. He played with Mogas in the CAF Confederation Cup 2004, where they were eliminated in the first round. He joined another Beninese club, Energie Cotonou, having played with them in the 2005–06 season. In 2007, he moved to the Ivory Coast, where he played with AS Denguélé during the first half of 2007, and then with Stade d'Abidjan during the second half. At the end of 2007, he moved to his third Côte d'Ivoire Premier Division club, Stella Club d'Adjamé, playing with them the first half of the 2008 season.

In the summer of 2008, he moved to Tunisia and signed with Olympique du Kef. The club was playing in the Tunisian second tier, but this ended up playing in Tayou's favour; he immediately made an impact and became the club's best scorer with 10 goals in the 2008–09 season and, in the following one, he became the second best top scorer of the 2009–10 Tunisian Ligue Professionnelle 2 with 12 goals. This good exhibition made him join Najran SC on loan, and he played in the Saudi Premier League between summer and winter 2011. In December 2011, he moved to Europe for the first time, joining Sloboda Užice, a mid-table Serbian SuperLiga side. On 20 September 2013, he signed with Mqabba playing in the Maltese First Division.

In the summer of 2014, he joined Finnish Ykkönen side AC Oulu. Then, in January 2015, he moved to Malta and joined Victoria Hotspurs.

== External sources ==
- Didier Tayou at Srbijafudbal
