= Jean-Jacques Bougouhi =

Ivorian footballer

Personal information
- Date of birth: 12 June 1992 (age 34)
- Place of birth: Bingerville, Ivory Coast
- Height: 1.77 m (5 ft 10 in)
- Position: Forward

Senior career*
Years	Team	Apps	(Gls)
2008–2012	ASEC Mimosas		
2013–2014	SOA		
2014–2015	Shirak	26	(21)
2015–2016	Torpedo Armavir	21	(6)
2016–2017	Ural Yekaterinburg	2	(0)
2017	HJK	5	(0)
2017–2018	İstanbulspor	15	(2)
2018–2019	Shirak	10	(1)
2019–2020	Ararat-Armenia	7	(3)
2020	Al-Mina'a	0	(0)
- * Club domestic league appearances and goals

Jean-Jacques Bougouhi (born 12 June 1992) is an Ivorian former professional football player who played as a forward.

== Career ==
Bougouhi was born in Bingerville. He made his professional debut in the Russian Football National League for FC Torpedo Armavir on 10 August 2015 in a game against FC Volga Nizhny Novgorod.

In June 2016, Bougouhi signed a long-term contract with Russian Premier League side Ural Yekaterinburg. He made his debut for Ural on 21 September 2016 in a Russian Cup game against FC Chelyabinsk. He made his Russian Premier League debut for Ural on 20 November 2016 in a game against FC Krasnodar.

On 10 July 2017, Bougouhi signed for HJK on a contract until the end of the 2017 season, with an option for an additional season.

In September 2018, Bougouhi returned to Shirak SC.

On 11 January 2019, Bougouhi left Shirak, joining Ararat-Armenia on 17 January 2019.

== Career statistics ==
As of match played 15 April 2019

Appearances and goals by club, season and competition
Club	Season	League			National Cup		Continental		Other		Total	
Club	Season	Division	Apps	Goals	Apps	Goals	Apps	Goals	Apps	Goals	Apps	Goals
Shirak	2014–15	Armenian Premier League	25	20	1	0	1	0	–		27	20
Shirak	2015–16	Armenian Premier League	1	1	0	0	4	3	–		5	4
Shirak	Total		26	21	1	0	5	3	0	0	32	24
Torpedo Armavir	2015–16	Russian National League	21	6	2	1	–		–		23	7
Ural Yekaterinburg	2016–17	Russian Premier League	2	0	1	0	–		–		3	0
HJK	2017	Veikkausliiga	2	0	0	0	0	0	–		2	0
İstanbulspor	2017–18	TFF First League	15	2	5	1	–		–		20	3
Shirak	2018–19	Armenian Premier League	10	1	2	0	–		–		12	1
Ararat-Armenia	2018–19	Armenian Premier League	7	3	0	0	–		–		7	3
Ararat-Armenia	2019–20	Armenian Premier League	0	0	0	0	0	0	0	0	0	0
Ararat-Armenia	Total		7	3	0	0	0	0	0	0	7	3
Career total			83	33	11	2	5	3	0	0	99	38

== Honours ==
ASEC Mimosas

- Ligue 1: 2009, 2010

Shirak

- Armenian Premier League top scorer: 2014–15 (21 goals)
