= Stephen Keshi =

Nigerian footballer and manager

- Keshi in 2005

Personal information
- Full name: Stephen Okechukwu Keshi
- Date of birth: 23 January 1962
- Place of birth: Azare, Bauchi State, Nigeria
- Date of death: 7 June 2016 (aged 54)
- Place of death: Benin City, Edo State, Nigeria
- Height: 1.85 m (6 ft 1 in)
- Position: Defender

Senior career*
Years	Team	Apps	(Gls)
1979	ACB Lagos	10	(1)
1980–1984	New Nigeria Bank	42	(4)
1985	Stade d'Abidjan	13	(2)
1986	Africa Sports	22	(2)
1986–1987	Lokeren	28	(6)
1987–1991	Anderlecht	99	(18)
1991–1993	Strasbourg	62	(9)
1993–1994	RWDM	40	(1)
1995	CCV Hydra	20	(1)
1996	Sacramento Scorpions	16	(3)
1997–1998	Perlis FA	34	(4)
Total		386	(51)

International career
1981–1995	Nigeria	64	(9)

Managerial career
- 2004–2006: Togo
- 2007–2008: Togo
- 2008–2010: Mali
- 2011: Togo
- 2011–2014: Nigeria
- 2015: Nigeria
Medal record
Men's football
Representing Nigeria (as player)
Africa Cup of Nations
Winner	1994
Representing Nigeria (as manager)
Winner	2013
- * Club domestic league appearances and goals

Stephen Okechukwu Keshi CON (23 January 1962 – 7 June 2016) was a Nigerian football player and manager.

During his playing career, Keshi played as a defender and earned 60 caps for the Nigeria national team, making him the nation's second-most capped player at the time of his retirement. He represented the country at the 1994 FIFA World Cup and the 1994 Africa Cup of Nations, captaining the Super Eagles to victory in the latter. He also played club football in five countries, most notably Belgium, where he won the Belgian league championship with R.S.C. Anderlecht in 1991.

As a manager, Keshi achieved success by qualifying Togo for the only FIFA World Cup appearance in its history in 2006. However, he left the position prior to the 2006 tournament and was replaced by Otto Pfister. He later coached his native Nigeria, becoming one of only two people, along with Egypt's Mahmoud El-Gohary, to have won the Africa Cup of Nations as both a player and a coach.

== Playing career ==
Keshi started with ACB Lagos in 1979, and joined New Nigerian Bank a year later, where over the course of four years he won 2 WAFU cups. However, in 1984, he was banned by the Nigeria Football Federation (NFF) from all football activities in Nigeria, so he left for Ivorian Stade d'Abidjan. It was the signing of the contract with Stade d'Abidjan that drew the ire of the NFF in banning Keshi. After helping Stade win two Coupe Houphouët-Boigny trophies in a year, he left for rivals Africa Sports, where he won the domestic double of the league and the cup. After a playing career mostly with Belgian clubs, where he won the Belgian league championship with R.S.C. Anderlecht in 1991. Keshi went to the United States to be educated in coaching.

== Coaching career ==
In 1996, he was joined by Augustine Eguavoen, who once coached the Nigerian national team. They played together in California as the backbone of the defence for the short-lived Sacramento Scorpions. Keshi has been a part of the coaching staff for the Nigerian national team, most notably as head coach for the Junior Eagles at the 2001 African Youth Championship which also served as qualification for the 2001 FIFA World Youth Championship, without success.

Between 2004 and 2006 Keshi coached the Togo national team, surprisingly bringing them to their first World Cup tournament, Germany 2006. Having secured Togo's unlikely qualification, he was promptly replaced by German coach Otto Pfister prior to the World Cup finals, after Togo showed a dismal performance and failed to advance to the knock-out stage in 2006 Africa Cup of Nations in Egypt. However, Pfister did not last beyond a controversial World Cup campaign that nearly resulted in a player's strike over pay and Togo remained without a manager until February 2007 when they re-engaged Keshi in time for a friendly against Cameroon.

He worked as manager of the Mali national team, after being appointed in April 2008 on a two-year deal. Keshi was sacked in January 2010, after Mali's early exit in the group stages of the 2010 Africa Cup of Nations.

=== Nigeria national team ===
Keshi became coach of the Nigeria national team in 2011. He led Nigeria to qualification for the 2013 Africa Cup of Nations, which they went on to win, defeating Burkina Faso 1–0 in the final. The following day Keshi handed in his resignation, only to reverse his decision the day after. Keshi led Nigeria to the 2013 Confederations Cup, defeated Tahiti 6–1, and lost 2–1 to Uruguay in the second game, and also lost 3–0 to World Cup winners, Spain in their final group game.

On 16 November 2013, Keshi's Nigeria secured qualification to the 2014 World Cup by beating Ethiopia 4–1 on aggregate in a play-off. Keshi set a record in African football by being the first African coach to qualify two African nations (Nigeria and Togo) for the World Cup Finals in 2005 and in 2013 earning him the CAF Coach of the Year on both occasions. He also helped Nigeria to achieve an African Cup of Nations trophy and World Cup qualification, both in 2013 like in 1994.

Nigeria progressed to the knockout stage of 2014 World Cup. They started the tournament with a 0–0 draw against Iran, followed by a controversial 1–0 win over Bosnia and Herzegovina. They lost the final group stage match 3–2 against Argentina, but progressed to the knockout stage, courtesy of a 3–1 win by Bosnia and Herzegovina over Iran. The Super Eagles lost to France in the first knock-out round. After the match, Keshi announced his resignation as Super Eagles coach but later reversed the decision after the Nigerian Football Federation renewed his contract.

His team failed to win a single game in the Morocco 2015 African Cup of Nations qualifying series and he announced he would move to another job if pressure continues to mount because of certain people, whom he refused to name, were trying to "sabotage" him. However, he stated that he will continue to coach the Super Eagles because he loves the team and he loves his country.

In July 2014, following Nigeria's exit from the World Cup, Keshi's contract with the Nigeria Football Federation (NFF) expired and was not renewed. A statement by the NFF Executive Committee said the decision was made, having thoroughly reviewed the reports/findings of the NFF Disciplinary Committee and NFF Technical and Development Committee, as well as having reviewed the actions and inaction of Stephen Keshi, in the performance of his duties as Super Eagles' Head Coach, which NFF found to lack the required commitment to achieve the Federation's objectives as set out in the Coach's employment contract.

== Personal life ==
Keshi was born on 23 January 1962 in Azare, Bauchi State. He hailed from Illah in Oshimili North Local Government Area of Delta State and was of Igbo descent. Keshi had his early education at Saint Paul's Catholic Nursery and Primary School, Apapa Road, Lagos State. He proceeded to Saint Finbarrs’ College, Akoka, Lagos in 1976. Keshi was married to Kate (née Aburime) for 30 years. She died on 10 December 2015, after battling cancer for three years. They had four children. Their oldest son Kos Keshi played football professionally.

Keshi had a heart attack and died en route to hospital on 7 June 2016 in Benin City, aged 54. His wife had died the previous December.

== Legacy ==
Keshi was honoured by Google with a doodle on what would have been his 56th birthday.

== Honours ==
=== Player ===
New Nigeria Bank

- West African Club Championship: 1983, 1984

Stade d'Abidjan

- Coupe Houphoet Boigny: 1985

Africa Sports

- Côte d'Ivoire Premier Division: 1986
- Côte d'Ivoire Coupe: 1986
- West African Club Championship: 1986
- Coupe Houphoet Boigny: 1986

Anderlecht

- Belgian First Division: 1986–87, 1990–91
- Belgian Cup: 1988–89, 1989–90
- Belgian Supercup: 1987
- European Cup Winners' Cup: 1989-90 (runners-up)
- Bruges Matins: 1988

Nigeria

- Africa Cup of Nations: 1994

=== Manager ===
Nigeria

- Africa Cup of Nations: 2013
- Confederations of African Football – African Coach of the Year 2013.

=== Individual ===
Orders

- Commander of the Order of the Niger
