= 2014–15 Shirak FC season =

Shirak
2014-15 season
- Chairman: Arman Sahakyan
- Manager: Vardan Bichakhchyan
- Stadium: Gyumri City Stadium
- Premier League: 3rd
- Armenian Cup: Quarterfinal vs Pyunik
- UEFA Europa League: First qualifying round vs Shakhter Karagandy
- Top goalscorer: League: Jean-Jacques Bougouhi (21); All: Jean-Jacques Bougouhi (21)
- Highest home attendance: 2,500 vs Shakhter Karagandy (3 July 2014)
- Lowest home attendance: 0 vs Mika (14 August 2014); 0 vs Banants (27 August 2014)
- Average home league attendance: 610 (24 May 2015)

The 2014–15 season was Shirak's 24th consecutive season in the Armenian Premier League and covers the period from 1 July 2014 to 30 June 2015.

== Squad ==
As of match played 30 May 2015

No.	Name	Nationality	Position	Date of birth (age)	Signed from	Signed in	Contract ends	Apps.	Goals
Goalkeepers
1	Norayr Abrahamyan	(Armenia)	GK	30 October 1985 (aged 29)	Academy	2009			
13	Gor Elyazyan	(Armenia)	GK	1 June 1991 (aged 23)	Mika	2014		26	0
Defenders
3	Artyom Mikaelyan	(Armenia)	DF	12 July 1991 (aged 23)	Youth team	2010		28	0
17	Davit Marikyan	(Armenia)	DF	8 May 1993 (aged 22)	Bötzingen	2013		59	3
20	Miloš Stamenković	(Serbia)	DF	1 June 1990 (aged 24)	Ararat Yerevan	2014		25	3
21	Gevorg Hovhannisyan	(Armenia)	DF	16 June 1983 (aged 31)	Youth team	2003			
23	Robert Darbinyan	(Armenia)	DF	1 June 1990 (aged 24)	loan from Krylia Sovetov	2014		23	1
25	Aghvan Davoyan	(Armenia)	DF	21 March 1990 (aged 25)	Youth team	2010			
32	Arman Tadevosyan	(Armenia)	DF	26 September 1994 (aged 20)	Youth team	2013		1	0
	Rudolf Rafaelyan	(Armenia)	DF	27 February 1995 (aged 20)	Youth team	2014		0	0
Midfielders
5	Tigran Davtyan	(Armenia)	MF	10 June 1978 (aged 36)	Ulisses	2009			
8	Gor Malakyan	(Armenia)	MF	12 June 1994 (aged 20)	Alashkert	2015		12	3
10	Davit Hakobyan	(Armenia)	MF	21 March 1993 (aged 22)	Youth team	2010			
12	Andranik Barikyan	(Armenia)	MF	11 September 1980 (aged 34)	Youth team	1998			
15	Karen Aleksanyan	(Armenia)	MF	17 June 1980 (aged 34)	Ulisses	2011			
16	Shahen Shahinyan	(Armenia)	MF	12 February 1995 (aged 20)	Youth team	2013		0	0
22	Edgar Malakyan	(Armenia)	MF	22 September 1990 (aged 24)	Alashkert	2015		13	1
22	Ousseynou Diop	(Senegal)	MF	22 July 1994 (aged 20)	Stallion Laguna	2015		6	0
41	Arman Aslanyan	(Armenia)	MF	30 January 1994 (aged 21)	Youth team	2013		0	0
Forwards
7	Viulen Ayvazyan	(Armenia)	FW	1 January 1995 (aged 20)	Pyunik	2015		12	2
9	Jean-Jacques Bougouhi	(Ivory Coast)	FW	12 June 1992 (aged 22)	SO de l'Armée	2014		27	20
11	Edvard Panosyan	(Armenia)	FW	11 October 1992 (aged 22)	Youth team	2013		17	1
18	Aram Muradyan	(Armenia)	FW	14 April 1995 (aged 20)	Academy	2013		24	2
27	Aram Tosunyan	(Armenia)	FW	29 May 1993 (aged 22)	Youth team	2011			
36	Drissa Diarrassouba	(Ivory Coast)	FW	15 November 1994 (aged 20)	loan from Ivoire Academie	2014	2015	30	2
Players out on loan
Players who left during the season
2	Steve Anoma	(Ivory Coast)	DF	21 January 1995 (aged 20)	Ivoire Academie	2014		11	0
8	Serges Déblé	(Ivory Coast)	FW	1 October 1989 (aged 25)	Khimki	2013		31	17
13	Arsen Beglaryan	(Armenia)	GK	18 February 1993 (aged 22)	Gandzasar Kapan	2014		1	0
14	Edward Kpodo	(Ghana)	DF	14 January 1990 (aged 25)	Shinnik Yaroslavl	2014		2	0
19	Karen Muradyan	(Armenia)	MF	1 November 1992 (aged 22)	Youth team	2011			
20	Yoro Lamine Ly	(Senegal)	FW	27 August 1988 (aged 26)	Bnei Yehuda	2014		77	24
22	Vsevolod Yermakov	(Russia)	GK	6 January 1996 (aged 19)	loan from Krasnodar	2014		1	0
29	Dame Diop	(Senegal)	FW	15 February 1993 (aged 22)	Khimki	2013		64	19
45	Emmanuel Gyamfi	(Ghana)	MF	1 December 1996 (aged 18)	Wa All Stars	2014		11	1
46	Andrei Gamalyan	(Armenia)	DF	27 January 1996 (aged 19)	loan from Krasnodar	2014		1	0
55	Serob Grigoryan	(Armenia)	DF	4 February 1995 (aged 20)	loan from Krylia Sovetov	2014		14	0

== Transfers ==
=== In ===
Date	Position	Nationality	Name	From	Fee	Ref.
1 July 2014	GK	(Armenia)	Arsen Beglaryan	Gandzasar Kapan	Undisclosed	
1 July 2014	DF	(Ghana)	Edward Kpodo	Shinnik Yaroslavl	Undisclosed	
1 July 2014	DF	(Ivory Coast)	Steve Anoma	Ivoire Academie	Undisclosed	
1 July 2014	FW	(Ivory Coast)	Jean-Jacques Bougouhi	SO de l'Armée	Undisclosed	
23 July 2014	GK	(Armenia)	Gor Elyazyan	Mika	Undisclosed	
28 July 2014	MF	(Ghana)	Emmanuel Gyamfi	Wa All Stars	Undisclosed	
25 August 2014	DF	(Serbia)	Miloš Stamenković	Ararat Yerevan	Undisclosed	
27 January 2015	MF	(Armenia)	Gor Malakyan	Alashkert	Undisclosed	
25 February 2015	FW	(Armenia)	Viulen Ayvazyan		Free	
28 February 2015	MF	(Senegal)	Ousseynou Diop	Stallion Laguna	Undisclosed	

=== Loan in ===
Start date	Position	Nationality	Name	From	End date	Ref.
19 June 2014	GK	(Russia)	Vsevolod Yermakov	Krasnodar	29 July 2014	
19 June 2014	DF	(Armenia)	Andrei Gamalyan	Krasnodar	31 December 2014	
1 July 2014	DF	(Armenia)	Robert Darbinyan	Krylia Sovetov	End of Season	
1 July 2014	DF	(Armenia)	Serob Grigoryan	Krylia Sovetov	31 December 2014	
1 July 2014	FW	(Ghana)	Drissa Diarrassouba	Ivoire Academie	End of Season	

=== Out ===
Date	Position	Nationality	Name	From	Fee	Ref.
1 July 2014	MF	(Ivory Coast)	Eboue Kouassi	Krasnodar	Undisclosed	
23 July 2014	GK	(Armenia)	Arsen Beglaryan	Ulisses	Undisclosed	
26 July 2014	DF	(Ghana)	Edward Kpodo	Ulisses	Undisclosed	
3 August 2014	FW	(Senegal)	Yoro Lamine Ly	Boavista	Undisclosed	
22 August 2014	FW	(Ivory Coast)	Serges Déblé	Viborg	Undisclosed	
13 February 2015	MF	(Armenia)	Karen Muradyan	Alashkert	Undisclosed	

=== Released ===
Date	Position	Nationality	Name	Joined	Date
1 August 2014	FW	(Senegal)	Dame Diop	Slavia Prague	1 August 2014
18 December 2014	MF	(Ghana)	Emmanuel Gyamfi	Asante Kotoko	1 July 2016
31 December 2014	DF	(Ivory Coast)	Steve Anoma	Cape Town	17 April 2015
30 June 2015	DF	(Armenia)	Davit Marikyan	SV Elversberg	1 January 2017
30 June 2015	MF	(Senegal)	Ousseynou Diop		

== Competitions ==
=== Premier League ===
==== Results summary ====
Overall								Home						Away					
Pld	W	D	L	GF	GA	GD	Pts	W	D	L	GF	GA	GD	W	D	L	GF	GA	GD
28	14	7	7	51	32	+19	49	8	3	3	21	11	+10	6	4	4	30	21	+9

Last updated: 30 May 2015.
Source: See Results

==== Results ====
9 August 2014 2	Ararat Yerevan	0 – 2	Shirak	Yerevan
19:00 (UTC+4)		Report	Bougouhi 83', 90'	Stadium: Hrazdan Stadium; Attendance: 100; Referee: Manuk Fahradyan

14 August 2014 3	Shirak	1 – 0	Mika	Gyumri
17:00 (UTC+4)	Aleksanyan (yellow card) 39'; Bougouhi 53'	Report	Alex (yellow card) 45'; V.Movsisyan (yellow card) 79'	Stadium: Gyumri City Stadium; Attendance: 0 Referee: Suren Baliyan

24 August 2014 4	Pyunik	1 – 0	Shirak	Yerevan
19:00 (UTC+4)	G.Hovhannisyan (yellow card) 3'; G.Poghosyan (yellow card) 8'; Romero 60'; Haroyan (red card) 70'	Report	K.Muradyan (yellow card) 72'; A.Davoyan (yellow card) 86'; A.Barikyan (red card) 90'	Stadium: Yerevan Football Academy Stadium; Attendance: 500; Referee: Gevorg Eghoyan

27 August 2014 1	Shirak	2 – 0	Banants	Gyumri
17:00 (UTC+4)	Bougouhi 3'; E.Gyamfi (yellow card) 31' (goal) 52'; S.Anoma (yellow card) 72'	Report	A.Shakhnazaryan (yellow card) 65'	Stadium: Gyumri City Stadium; Attendance: 0 Referee: Manuk Fahradyan

13 September 2014 6	Alashkert	2 – 0	Shirak	Yerevan
16:10 (UTC+4)	Minasyan (yellow card) 47'; Malakyan 77'; N.Davtyan 80' (yellow card) 81'	Report	Stamenković (yellow card) 40'	Stadium: Alashkert Stadium; Attendance: 200; Referee: Zaven Hovhannisyan

20 September 2014 7	Shirak	1 – 2	Ulisses	Gyumri
16:10 (UTC+4)	Hakobyan (yellow card) 15'; S.Anoma (yellow card) 50'; Stamenković (yellow card) 65'; Darbinyan (yellow card) 70'; Lalić 75' (o.g.)	Report	Z.Janashia 12'; G.Khubua 20' (yellow card) 86'; Kpodo (yellow card) 42'; Khurtsidze (yellow card) 80'	Stadium: Gyumri City Stadium; Attendance: 1,000; Referee: Suren Baliyan

28 September 2014 8	Banants	1 – 1	Shirak	Yerevan
14:40 (UTC+4)	V.Ayvazyan 25'; Karapetyan (yellow card) 66'; G.Nranyan (yellow card) 86'	Report	Diarrassouba 55'; Darbinyan (yellow card) 56'; K.Muradyan (yellow card) 67'	Stadium: Banants Stadium; Attendance: 500; Referee: Artur Safaryan

4 October 2014 9	Shirak	3 – 2	Ararat Yerevan	Gyumri
14:40 (UTC+4)	D.Marikyan 25' (yellow card) 71'; A.Barikyan 34' (pen.); Diarrassouba 44'; S.Grigoryan (yellow card) 63'	Report	R.Di Lauro (yellow card) 32' (goal) 57'; Tomčić 59'; Z.Bulut (yellow card) 69'	Stadium: Gyumri City Stadium; Attendance: 800; Referee: Artur Simonyan

19 October 2014 10	Mika	3 – 1	Shirak	Yerevan
14:40 (UTC+4)	A.Voskanyan 3' (yellow card) 37'; D.Grigoryan 35'; Barseghyan 72'	Report	K.Muradyan (yellow card) 12'; Davtyan (yellow card) 23'; Diarrassouba 60'; D.Marikyan (yellow card) 71'	Stadium: Mika Stadium; Attendance: 500; Referee: Manuk Fahradyan

26 October 2014 11	Shirak	0 – 0	Pyunik	Gyumri
14:40 (UTC+4)	Aleksanyan (yellow card) 58'; D.Marikyan (yellow card) 59'	Report	Romero (yellow card) 30'	Stadium: Gyumri City Stadium; Attendance: 700; Referee: Karen Nalbandyan

1 November 2014 12	Gandzasar Kapan	0 – 3	Shirak	Kapan
14:40 (UTC+4)		Report	Bougouhi 7', 56', 67' (yellow card) 37'; K.Muradyan (yellow card) 33'; Aleksanyan (yellow card) 78'	Stadium: Gandzasar Stadium; Attendance: 700; Referee: Manuk Fahradyan

9 November 2014 13	Shirak	1 – 1	Alashkert	Gyumri
14:40 (UTC+4)	Bougouhi 45' (pen.); K.Muradyan (yellow card) 89'	Report	Malakyan 30' (pen.); Ghazaryan (red card) 41'; A.Bareghamyan (yellow card) 81'; M.Manasyan (red card) 90+3'	Stadium: Gyumri City Stadium; Attendance: 800; Referee: Zaven Hovhannisyan

18 November 2014 5	Shirak	1 – 0	Gandzasar Kapan	Gyumri
14:40 (UTC+4)	Hakobyan 29' (yellow card) 86'; D.Marikyan (yellow card) 40'; G. Hovhannisyan (yellow card) 45'; A.Barikyan (yellow card) 83'; Darbinyan (yellow card) 90+1'	Report	A.Grigoryan (yellow card) 16'	Stadium: Gyumri City Stadium; Attendance: 650; Referee: Suren Baliyan

22 November 2014 14	Ulisses	1 – 2	Shirak	Yerevan
16:10 (UTC+4)	Aleksanyan (yellow card) 31'; Goharyan (yellow card) 57'; Khurtsidze 68' (yellow card) 86'; Dugalić (red card) 88'	Report	A.Davoyan (yellow card) 5'; Hakobyan 7'; Diarrassouba 52'	Stadium: Vazgen Sargsyan Republican Stadium; Attendance: 180; Referee: Manuk Fahradyan

30 November 2014 15	Shirak	2 – 2	Banants	Gyumri
14:40 (UTC+4)	Bougouhi 50' (yellow card) 54'; Darbinyan (yellow card) 52'; Hakobyan 59'; Hovhannisyan (yellow card) 73'	Report	D.Marikyan 11' (o.g.); N.Minasyan (yellow card) 25'; A.Loretsyan (yellow card) 41'; K.Harutyunyan (yellow card) 45'; Karapetyan 88'	Stadium: Gyumri City Stadium; Attendance: 500; Referee: Manuk Fahradyan

1 March 2015 16	Ararat Yerevan	2 – 4	Shirak	Yerevan
16:00 (UTC+4)	D.G.Grigoryan (yellow card) 41'; Volchkov (yellow card) 53'; Proesmans (yellow card) 62'; A.Azatyan 83'; Rakić 88'	Report	G.Malakyan 28'; Bougouhi 53' (pen.), 57' (pen.); Ayvazyan 66'; Darbinyan (red card) 73'	Stadium: Hrazdan Stadium; Attendance: 200; Referee: Manuk Fahradyan

8 March 2015 17	Shirak	2 – 0	Mika	Gyumri
14:00 (UTC+4)	Bougouhi 19', 75'; G.Malakyan (yellow card) 33'	Report	Alex (yellow card) 12'; Barseghyan (yellow card) 59'	Stadium: Gyumri City Stadium; Attendance: 200; Referee: Artak Simonyan

15 March 2015 18	Pyunik	2 – 1	Shirak	Yerevan
16:00 (UTC+4)	K.Hovhannisyan 34'; Badoyan 56'	Report	A.Davoyan (yellow card) 17'; Bougouhi 22' (yellow card) 59'	Stadium: Yerevan Football Academy Stadium; Attendance: 500; Referee: Zaven Hovhannisyan

21 March 2015 19	Shirak	2 – 0	Gandzasar Kapan	Gyumri
14:40 (UTC+4)	Hakobyan 5', 45'; E.Malakyan (yellow card) 22'; Darbinyan (yellow card) 44'; Aleksanyan (yellow card) 44'; G.Malakyan (yellow card) 61'; Stamenković (yellow card) 68'	Report	A.Petrosyan (yellow card) 4'; Beglaryan (yellow card) 61'	Stadium: Gyumri City Stadium; Attendance: 110; Referee: Artur Safaryan

5 April 2015 20	Alashkert	1 – 1	Shirak	Yerevan
14:40 (UTC+4)	M.Manasyan (yellow card) 10'; A.Bareghamyan 24'; Gnedko (yellow card) 51'	Report	E.Malakyan (yellow card) 56'; Stamenković 90'; G.Elyazyan (yellow card) 90'	Stadium: Alashkert Stadium; Attendance: 200; Referee: Suren Baliyan

11 April 2015 21	Shirak	2 – 0	Ulisses	Gyumri
16:00 (UTC+4)	A.Barikyan 21' (yellow card) 45'; Hakobyan 24' (yellow card) 67'; Darbinyan (yellow card) 68'; D.Marikyan (yellow card) 87'; Aleksanyan (yellow card) 90+2'	Report	Beglaryan (yellow card) 45'; Piliyev (yellow card) 78'; Gatagov (yellow card) 90+2'	Stadium: Gyumri City Stadium; Attendance: 500; Referee: Zaven Hovhannisyan

19 April 2015 22	Banants	3 – 6	Shirak	Yerevan
16:00 (UTC+4)	Poghosyan (yellow card) 15'; Avetisyan 50'; López 73'; Manucharyan (yellow card) 79'; Hovhannisyan 89' (o.g.)	Report	E.Malakyan 31'; A.Barikyan 40'; Bougouhi 51', 58', 60', 66'	Stadium: Banants Stadium; Attendance: 100; Referee: Suren Baliyan

25 April 2015 23	Shirak	4 – 0	Ararat Yerevan	Gyumri
17:00 (UTC+4)	Bougouhi 24', 72'; G.Malakyan 39'; Stamenković 51'	Report	Rakić (yellow card) 57'; V.Martirosyan (red card) 71' de la Fuente (yellow card) 76'	Stadium: Gyumri City Stadium; Attendance: 500; Referee: Edgar Sahakyan

3 May 2015 24	Mika	2 – 2	Shirak	Yerevan
14:40 (UTC+4)	Karapetyan 53'; V.Satumyan 77'	Report	Diarrassouba 36'; D.Marikyan 54'; O.Diop (yellow card) 76'	Stadium: Mika Stadium; Attendance: 1,000; Referee: Suren Baliyan

10 May 2015 25	Shirak	0 – 2	Pyunik	Gyumri
14:40 (UTC+4)	Aleksanyan (yellow card) 67'; D.Marikyan (yellow card) 73'	Report	G.Poghosyan (yellow card) 31'; Badoyan 59'; Aslanyan 81'	Stadium: Gyumri City Stadium; Attendance: 500; Referee: Suren Baliyan

16 May 2016 26	Gandzasar Kapan	3 – 3	Shirak	Kapan
17:00 (UTC+4)	Beglaryan 32', 47' (yellow card) 74'; A.Khachatryan 34' (pen.)	Report	Bougouhi 10'; Stamenković (yellow card) 24' (goal) 85'; A.Davoyan (yellow card) 33'; A.Muradyan 69' (red card) 89'; A.Barikyan (yellow card) 87'	Stadium: Gandzasar Stadium; Attendance: 1,000; Referee: Suren Baliyan

24 May 2015 27	Shirak	0 – 2	Alashkert	Gyumri
17:00 (UTC+4)	Bougouhi (yellow card) 89'	Report	Minasyan 51'; M.Manasyan 90'	Stadium: Gyumri City Stadium; Attendance: 800; Referee: Zaven Hovhannisyan

30 May 2015 28	Ulisses	0 – 4	Shirak	Yerevan
17:35 (UTC+4)	Morozov (yellow card) 79'	Report	Diarrassouba 29'; A.Barikyan (yellow card) 36' (goal) 42'; G.Malakyan (yellow card) 64'; Ayvazyan 65'; Darbinyan 85'	Stadium: Vazgen Sargsyan Republican Stadium; Attendance: 300; Referee: Artak Simonyan

==== Table ====
Pos	Team	Pld	W	D	L	GF	GA	GD	Pts	Qualification
1	Pyunik (C)	28	19	4	5	58	26	+32	61	Qualification for the Champions League first qualifying round
2	Ulisses	28	15	5	8	43	32	+11	50	Qualification for the Europa League first qualifying round
3	Shirak	28	14	7	7	51	32	+19	49	Qualification for the Europa League first qualifying round
4	Alashkert	28	10	8	10	32	35	−3	38	Qualification for the Europa League first qualifying round
5	Mika	28	9	10	9	33	34	−1	37	

Source: uefa.com
Rules for classification: 1) points; 2) goal difference; 3) number of goals scored
(C) Champions

=== Armenian Cup ===
17 September 2014 Quarterfinal 1st leg	Pyunik	3 – 0	Shirak	Yerevan
19:00 (UTC+4)	Romero (yellow card) 10' (goal) 21', 57'; Yuspashyan (yellow card) 25'; Haroyan 90'	Report	K.Muradyan (yellow card) 30'; S.Anoma (yellow card) 33'; D.Marikyan (yellow card) 90'	Stadium: Yerevan Football Academy Stadium; Attendance: 700; Referee: Suren Baliyan

5 November 2014 Quarterfinal 2nd leg	Shirak	0 – 1 (0 – 4 agg.)	Pyunik	Gyumri
15:00 (UTC+4)	A.Barikyan (yellow card) 70'; Davtyan (yellow card) 72'; S.Anoma (red card) 75'	Report	Ga.Poghosyan 24'; Ra.Hakobyan (yellow card) 45'; Voskanyan (yellow card) 72'	Stadium: Gyumri City Stadium; Attendance: 200; Referee: Manuk Fahradyan

=== UEFA Europa League ===
==== Qualifying rounds ====
3 July 2014 First qualifying round 1st leg	Shirak (Armenia)	1 – 2	(Kazakhstan) Shakhter Karagandy	Gyumri, Armenia
18:00 (UTC+4)	D.Marikyan (yellow card) 75'; Déblé 85' (pen.)	Report	Simčević (yellow card) 13'; Vičius (yellow card) 57'; Topcagić 71'; Finonchenko (yellow card) 77'; Malyi 83'	Stadium: Gyumri City Stadium; Attendance: 2,500; Referee: Yuriy Mozharovskyy (Ukraine)

10 July 2014 First qualifying round 2nd leg	Shakhter Karagandy (Kazakhstan)	4 – 0 (6 – 1 agg.)	(Armenia) Shirak	Karaganda, Kazakhstan
16:30 (UTC+6)	Kpodo 12' (o.g.); Konysbayev 29'; Pokrivač 45+1'; Finonchenko 49'; Simčević (yellow card) 77'	Report	Muradyan (yellow card) 30'; Kpodo (yellow card) 39'; Hakobyan (yellow card) 90+1'	Stadium: Shakhter Stadium; Attendance: 11,200; Referee: Eitan Shemeulevitch (Israel)

== Statistics ==
As of match played 30 May 2015

=== Appearances and goals ===
No.	Pos	Nat	Player	Total		Premier League		Armenian Cup		UEFA Europa League	
No.	Pos	Nat	Player	Apps	Goals	Apps	Goals	Apps	Goals	Apps	Goals
1	GK	(Armenia) ARM	Norayr Abrahamyan	4	0	2	0	2	0	0	0
3	DF	(Armenia) ARM	Artyom Mikaelyan	5	0	5	0	0	0	0	0
5	MF	(Armenia) ARM	Tigran Davtyan	29	0	18+7	0	1+1	0	1+1	0
7	FW	(Armenia) ARM	Viulen Ayvazyan	12	2	1+11	2	0	0	0	0
8	MF	(Armenia) ARM	Gor Malakyan	12	3	12	3	0	0	0	0
9	FW	(Ivory Coast) CIV	Jean-Jacques Bougouhi	27	20	24+1	20	1	0	1	0
10	MF	(Armenia) ARM	Davit Hakobyan	31	6	26+1	6	2	0	2	0
11	FW	(Armenia) ARM	Edvard Panosyan	2	0	0+2	0	0	0	0	0
12	MF	(Armenia) ARM	Andranik Barikyan	24	4	9+12	4	1	0	0+2	0
13	GK	(Armenia) ARM	Gor Elyazyan	26	0	26	0	0	0	0	0
15	MF	(Armenia) ARM	Karen Aleksanyan	27	0	17+7	0	1	0	2	0
17	DF	(Armenia) ARM	Davit Marikyan	24	2	16+4	2	2	0	2	0
18	FW	(Armenia) ARM	Aram Muradyan	11	1	2+7	1	1	0	0+1	0
20	DF	(Serbia) SRB	Miloš Stamenković	25	3	24	3	1	0	0	0
21	DF	(Armenia) ARM	Gevorg Hovhannisyan	21	0	17+1	0	1	0	2	0
22	MF	(Armenia) ARM	Edgar Malakyan	13	1	13	1	0	0	0	0
23	DF	(Armenia) ARM	Robert Darbinyan	23	1	15+6	1	0+1	0	0+1	0
25	DF	(Armenia) ARM	Aghvan Davoyan	27	0	25+1	0	1	0	0	0
27	FW	(Armenia) ARM	Aram Tosunyan	2	0	0+1	0	0+1	0	0	0
32	DF	(Armenia) ARM	Arman Tadevosyan	1	0	1	0	0	0	0	0
36	FW	(Ivory Coast) CIV	Drissa Diarrassouba	30	2	22+5	2	1+1	0	0+1	0
42	MF	(Senegal) SEN	Ousseynou Diop	6	0	1+5	0	0	0	0	0
Players away on loan:
Players who left Shirak during the season:
2	DF	(Ivory Coast) CIV	Steve Anoma	11	0	9	0	2	0	0	0
8	FW	(Ivory Coast) CIV	Serges Déblé	2	1	0	0	0	0	2	1
13	GK	(Armenia) ARM	Arsen Beglaryan	1	0	0	0	0	0	1	0
14	DF	(Ghana) GHA	Edward Kpodo	2	0	0	0	0	0	2	0
19	MF	(Armenia) ARM	Karen Muradyan	17	0	12+1	0	1+1	0	2	0
20	FW	(Senegal) SEN	Yoro Lamine Ly	2	0	0	0	0	0	2	0
22	GK	(Russia) RUS	Vsevolod Yermakov	1	0	0	0	0	0	1	0
29	FW	(Senegal) SEN	Dame Diop	2	0	0	0	0	0	2	0
45	MF	(Ghana) GHA	Emmanuel Gyamfi	11	1	5+4	1	2	0	0	0
46	DF	(Armenia) ARM	Andrei Gamalyan	1	0	0	0	1	0	0	0
55	DF	(Armenia) ARM	Serob Grigoryan	14	0	6+6	0	1+1	0	0	0

=== Goal scorers ===
Place	Position	Nation	Number	Name	Premier League	Armenian Cup	UEFA Europa League	Total
1	FW	(Ivory Coast)	9	Jean-Jacques Bougouhi	21	0	0	21
2	MF	(Armenia)	10	Davit Hakobyan	6	0	0	6
2	FW	(Ivory Coast)	36	Drissa Diarrassouba	6	0	0	6
4	MF	(Armenia)	12	Andranik Barikyan	4	0	0	4
5	DF	(Serbia)	20	Miloš Stamenković	3	0	0	3
6	MF	(Armenia)	8	Gor Malakyan	2	0	0	2
6	DF	(Armenia)	17	Davit Marikyan	2	0	0	2
6	FW	(Armenia)	7	Viulen Ayvazyan	2	0	0	2
9	DF	(Armenia)	23	Robert Darbinyan	1	0	0	1
9	MF	(Armenia)	22	Edgar Malakyan	1	0	0	1
9	FW	(Armenia)	18	Aram Muradyan	1	0	0	1
9	MF	(Ghana)	45	Emmanuel Gyamfi	1	0	0	1
9	FW	(Ivory Coast)	8	Serges Déblé	0	0	1	1
9				Own goal	1	0	0	1
				TOTALS	51	0	1	52

=== Clean sheets ===
Place	Position	Nation	Number	Name	Premier League	Armenian Cup	UEFA Europa League	Total
1	GK	(Armenia)	13	Gor Elyazyan	11	0	0	11
				TOTALS	11	0	0	11

=== Disciplinary record ===
Number	Nation	Position	Name	Premier League		Armenian Cup		UEFA Europa League		Total	
Number	Nation	Position	Name	Booked	Sent off (straight red)	Booked	Sent off (straight red)	Booked	Sent off (straight red)	Booked	Sent off (straight red)
5	(Armenia)	MF	Tigran Davtyan	1	0	1	0	0	0	2	0
8	(Armenia)	MF	Gor Malakyan	3	0	0	0	0	0	3	0
9	(Ivory Coast)	FW	Jean-Jacques Bougouhi	4	0	0	0	0	0	4	0
10	(Armenia)	MF	Davit Hakobyan	3	0	0	0	1	0	4	0
12	(Armenia)	MF	Andranik Barikyan	5	0	1	0	0	0	6	0
13	(Armenia)	GK	Gor Elyazyan	1	0	0	0	0	0	1	0
15	(Armenia)	MF	Karen Aleksanyan	6	0	0	0	0	0	6	0
17	(Armenia)	DF	Davit Marikyan	6	0	1	0	1	0	8	0
18	(Armenia)	FW	Aram Muradyan	1	0	0	0	0	0	1	0
20	(Serbia)	DF	Miloš Stamenković	4	0	0	0	0	0	4	0
21	(Armenia)	DF	Gevorg Hovhannisyan	2	0	0	0	0	0	2	0
22	(Armenia)	DF	Edgar Malakyan	2	0	0	0	0	0	2	0
23	(Armenia)	DF	Robert Darbinyan	6	1	0	0	0	0	6	1
25	(Armenia)	MF	Aghvan Davoyan	4	0	0	0	0	0	4	0
42	(Senegal)	DF	Ousseynou Diop	1	0	0	0	0	0	1	0
Players away on loan:
Players who left Shirak during the season:
2	(Ivory Coast)	DF	Steve Anoma	2	0	1	1	0	0	3	1
14	(Ghana)	DF	Edward Kpodo	0	0	0	0	1	0	1	0
19	(Armenia)	MF	Karen Muradyan	4	0	1	0	1	0	6	0
45	(Ghana)	MF	Emmanuel Gyamfi	1	0	0	0	0	0	1	0
55	(Armenia)	DF	Serob Grigoryan	1	0	0	0	0	0	1	0
			TOTALS	0	0	5	1	4	0	9	1
