= Aristide Zogbo =

Ivorian footballer (born 1981)

Personal information
- Full name: Aristide Benoît Zogbo
- Date of birth: 30 December 1981 (age 44)
- Place of birth: Abidjan, Ivory Coast
- Height: 1.84 m (6 ft 0 in)
- Position: Goalkeeper

Youth career
- –2004: Issia Wazi

Senior career*
| Years | Team | Apps | (Gls) |
| 2003–2007 | Issia Wazi | 55 | |
| 2007–2009 | Ittihad El Shorta | 45 | |
| 2009–2010 | Maccabi Netanya | 24 | (0) |
| 2012–2013 | ES Bingerville | | |
| Total | | 124 | (0) |

International career
| 2008–2010 | Ivory Coast | 3 | (0) |
- * Club domestic league appearances and goals

Aristide Benoît Zogbo (born 30 December 1981) is an Ivorian former professional footballer who played as a goalkeeper. He made three appearances for the Ivory Coast national team and was part of the squads at the 2010 Africa Cup of Nations and the 2010 FIFA World Cup.

== Club career ==
Zogbo was born in Abidjan, Ivory Coast.

He was signed on 1 July 2007 by Ittihad El Shorta in Egypt, joining from Issia Wazi.

Zogbo played for Ittihad El-Shorta until 3 September 2009, and signed then a one-year contract with Israeli club Maccabi Netanya.

== International career ==
His debut for the Les Éléphants was on 20 August 2008 against Guinea in Paris, in a friendly game.

== Career statistics ==
=== International ===
Ivory Coast national team
| Year | Apps | Goals |
| 2008 | 1 | 0 |
| 2009 | 2 | 0 |
| 2010 | 0 | 0 |
| Total | 3 | 0 |

== Honours ==
Issia Wazi

- Ivory Coast Cup: 2006; runner-up: 2007
