= Tiémoko Konaté =

Ivorian footballer (born 1990)

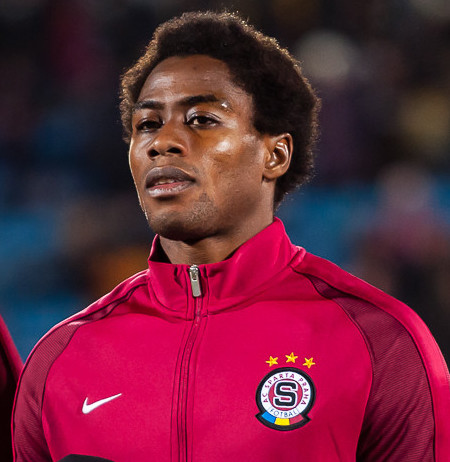
- Konaté with Sparta in 2017

Personal information
- Full name: Tiémoko Konaté
- Date of birth: 3 March 1990 (age 36)
- Place of birth: Abidjan, Ivory Coast
- Height: 1.74 m (5 ft 9 in)
- Position: Winger

Youth career
- –2009: EFYM

Senior career*
Years	Team	Apps	(Gls)
2009–2011	EFYM	0	(0)
2011–2012	Africa Sports	37	(9)
2012–2013	→ Sparta Prague U21 (loan)	31	(16)
2013–2018	Sparta Prague	71	(6)
2018–2019	Mladá Boleslav	26	(2)
2019–2023	Vendsyssel	131	(21)

International career
2012–	Ivory Coast	2	(0)
- * Club domestic league appearances and goals as of 17 June 2023

Tiémoko Konaté (born 3 March 1990) is an Ivorian professional footballer who plays as a winger.

Konaté started out his career in his native Ivory Coast before a prolific period at Czech club Sparta Prague where he would play for six years, winning the Czech First League championship and the Czech Cup in 2014.

A dynamic winger, he is known for his agility and strong technique.

== Career ==
=== Early career ===
A winger, Konaté began his career in his native Ivory Coast at EFYM in Abidjan. During the 2011 season, the club advanced from the Ivorian second tier to the MTN Ligue 1 with Konaté being voted the Ligue 2 Player of the Year for his performances during the season. After the season ended, he joined Africa Sports who had won the championship the year before. In February 2012, he made his first appearance in the preliminary round of the CAF Champions League, as well as in the Coupe Houphouët-Boigny, the Ivorian Super Cup. The latter was a matchup against ASEC Mimosas, which Africa Sports lost 1–2.

=== Sparta Prague ===
In September 2012, Konaté joined Czech side Sparta Prague on a one-year loan deal after a successful 14-day trial at the club. During his trial, he had scored three goals in two matches in the Czech Reserve League, one in a 1–2 loss to Hradec Králové and a brace in a 4–1 win overDukla Prague. As part of the loan deal, Sparta had the option to sign Konaté on a permanent contract.

After spending most of the 2012–13 season as part of the reserve team, Konaté made his first-team debut for Sparta Prague on 1 June 2013 in a match against Dukla Prague, as a 88th-minute substitute for Marek Matějovský. Sparta won 3–0. Before the start of the 2013–14 season, Sparta exercised the buy-out clause in his contract and made him a permanent part of the club.

Konaté scored his first league goal on 31 August 2013 in a 4–1 home win over Baník Ostrava, closing the score in the 90th minute. He mostly appeared as a substitute during a season which culminated with Sparta Prague lifting the Czech First League trophy as early as 4 May 2014, several rounds before the end of the competition. On 17 May, he won the double with Sparta as they beat Viktoria Plzeň 8–7 in a penalty shoot-out to claim the Czech Cup.

In the first half of the 2014–15 season, Konaté emerged as a starter in the Sparta lineup due to some good performances as a winger. He made his first European appearance on 22 July 2014 in a Champions League-qualifier against Estonian side FCI Levadia which ended in a 1–1 draw as Sparta advanced to the next round 8–1 on aggregate. In the following round, however, Sparta lost on aggregate to Swedish club Malmö FF but qualified for the group stage of the Europa League. In the group stage match against Slovan Bratislava on 23 October, Konaté made his first European goal and provided an assist as Sparta won 3–0 away at Tehelné pole. However, after having only scored only one goal in competition during the season, Sparta-coach Zdeněk Ščasný criticised Konaté for being too inefficient in front of goal. In order to secure the funds for Ondřej Zahustel, Sparta was keen on selling Konaté to league rivals Fastav Zlín during the transfer window – Konaté refused. After the transfer fell through, Konaté stated that he would work on performing better.

Konaté appeared mostly as a substitute the following season, but a strong performance in the third qualifying-round of the Champions League against Romanian side FCSB resulted in a €1 million offer from the Bucharest-based club, which Sparta refused according to FCSB owner Gigi Becali. Konaté was then omitted from the Sparta Prague squad, as he refused to practice to force through a move to FCSB. As a result, he was demoted to reserves for the season. During the winter break, however, he was reassigned to the first team squad to prepare for the last six months of the 2016–17 season. On 17 February 2017, Konaté was selected in Sparta's starting line-up for the Europa League round of 32 matchup against Russian club Rostov, receiving his second yellow card after only 32 minutes causing Sparta to collapse and suffer a stunning 4–0 loss; the largest defeat for the club in Europe since a 1981–82 UEFA Cup match against Neuchâtel Xamax. This, together with the earlier failed FCSB transfer incident, meant that he became hugely unpopular among Sparta fans who would whistle and curse him during the spring. Konaté would make his final appearance for the Sparta first team on 12 May 2017.

The arrival of new head coach Andrea Stramaccioni meant that Konaté was once again demoted to the reserve team ahead of the 2017–18 season.

=== Mladá Boleslav ===
On 14 February 2018, Konaté was signed by league rivals Mladá Boleslav, after the club had expressed their interest in him two years prior to the transfer. He signed a one-and-a-half-year contract with Mladá. On 24 February, Konaté made his debut for the club as a starter in a 1–0 away loss at Stadion u Nisy to Slovan Liberec. He made 14 appearances during his first six months, scoring one goal.

Konaté would go on to make 14 more appearances the following season before ending his tenure with Mladá Boleslav in January 2019.

=== Vendsyssel ===
On 29 January 2019, Konaté signed a one-year contract with Danish Superliga club Vendsyssel FF. In the wake of the completed transfer, general manager Ole Nielsen stated that Konaté possessed the agility and technique which Vendsyssel had been searching for. After the season ended, and the club had relegated to the Danish second tier, Konaté signed a three-year contract extension. Konaté left Vendsyssel at the end of the 2022–23 season.

== Career statistics ==
=== Club ===
As of match played 19 February 2017

Club	Season	League			National Cup		Continental		Other		Total	
Club	Season	Division	Apps	Goals	Apps	Goals	Apps	Goals	Apps	Goals	Apps	Goals
Sparta Prague	2012–13	Czech First League	1	0	0	0	–		–		1	0
Sparta Prague	2013–14	Czech First League	12	1	5	1	–		–		17	2
Sparta Prague	2014–15	Czech First League	25	1	3	1	7	1	0	0	35	3
Sparta Prague	2015–16	Czech First League	20	3	5	1	13	0	–		38	4
Sparta Prague	2016–17	Czech First League	3	1	0	0	3	0	–		6	1
Sparta Prague	Total		61	6	13	3	23	3	0	0	97	12
Career total			61	6	13	3	23	3	0	0	97	12

=== International ===
Ivory Coast national team
Year	Apps	Goals
2012	1	0
2013	0	0
2014	0	0
2015	0	0
2016	1	0
Total	2	0

Statistics accurate as of match played 20 May 2016

== Honours ==
Sparta Prague

- Czech First League: 2013–14
- Czech Cup: 2013–14
- Czech Supercup: 2014
