= Kassi Akesse Mathias =

Ivorian footballer

Kassi Mathias
Personal information
- Full name: Kassi Akesse Mathias
- Date of birth: 21 November 1985 (age 40)
- Place of birth: Abidjan, Ivory Coast
- Height: 1.83 m (6 ft 0 in)
- Positions: Centre back; full back

Team information
- Current team: Ittihad Tanger

Senior career*
Years	Team	Apps	(Gls)
2004–2005	Ecole Autonome		
2005–2006	CO Bouaflé		
2006–2007	Requin F.C.		
2007–2008	Denguelé		
2008–2012	JC Abidjan		
2012–2013	Séwé Sports		
2013–2018	OC Safi	95	(4)
2018–2019	OC Khouribga	31	(1)
2020–	IR Tanger		
- * Club domestic league appearances and goals as of 17:55, 17 January 2020 (UTC)

Kassi Mathias (born 21 November 1986 in Abidjan) is an Ivorian footballer. He plays as a defender for Moroccan side Ittihad Tanger.

== Club career ==
He played for many big clubs in Ivory Coast and Benin and has great performance records. In the 2008–09 season, Kassi was named the best defender in all Ivory-Coast League. This performance attracted notice from clubs at home and abroad. He also participated in CAF competition in 2007 for Denguelé. On 31 December 2009, Kassi joined El-Entag El-Harby and was offered a contract after a successful 2-week trial. El-Entag El-Harby and Jeunesse Club d'Abidjan did not agree on transfer fees of $50,000. Therefore, Kassi returned to Jeunesse Club d'Abidjan on 31 January 2010.
