= Arthur Kocou =

Ivorian footballer (born 1983)

Personal information
- Full name: Valéry Pierre Arthur Kocou
- Date of birth: 21 December 1983 (age 42)
- Place of birth: Ivory Coast
- Height: 1.71 m (5 ft 7 in)
- Position: Midfielder

Team information
- Current team: Stade Tunisien
- Number: 13

Youth career
- –2002: Stella Club d'Adjamé

Senior career*
Years	Team	Apps	(Gls)
2002–2004	Stella Club d'Adjamé		
2004–2008	ASEC Mimosas		
2009–	Stade Tunisien		
- * Club domestic league appearances and goals as of 22 January 2009

Valéry Arthur Kocou (born 21 December 1983) is an Ivorian footballer, who plays as a midfielder for Stade Tunisien.

== Career ==
Kocou began his career with Stella Club d'Adjamé and joined ASEC Mimosas in January 2004. He played a role in ASEC's success in the 2006, 2007 and 2008 CAF Champions League. On 18 January 2009, Kocou left the team and joined Stade Tunisien, where he signed a contract that runs until 30 June 2012.
