= Angban =

Angban is a surname. Notable people with the surname include:

- Victorien Angban (born 1996), Ivorian footballer
- Vincent Angban (born 1985), Ivorian footballer
