= Stade Municipal (Bingerville) =

Multi-use stadium in Bingerville, Côte d'Ivoire

Coordinates: 5.359306°N 3.889643°W

Stade Municipal is a multi-use stadium in Bingerville, Côte d'Ivoire. It is currently used mostly for football matches. It serves as a home ground of Entente Sportive de Bingerville. The stadium holds 4,000 people.
