= 1983 WAFU Club Championship =

Tournament details
- Teams: 12 (from 1 confederation)

Final positions
- Champions: (Nigeria) New Nigerian Bank FC (1st title)
- Runners-up: (Ghana) Sekondi Hassaacas

Tournament statistics
- Matches played: 22
- Goals scored: 38 (1.73 per match)

The 1983 WAFU Club Championship was the seventh football club tournament season that took place for the runners-up of each West African country's domestic league, the West African Club Championship. It was won by New Nigerian Bank in the first of two finals matches against Ghana's Sekondi Hasaacas FC. It featured 12 clubs and 22 matches, four shorter than last season. As the military team ASFA Nouakchott forfeited and Ghana's Great Olympics headed to the quarterfinals, the match totals shortened to 20. A total of 38 goals were scored fewer than last season.

Not a single club from the Gambia, Liberia and Niger participated in the edition.

== Preliminary round ==
Team 1	Agg.	Team 2	1st leg	2nd leg
Great Olympics (Ghana)	—	(Mauritania) ASFA Nouakchott (forfeited)	—	—
Requins de l'Atlantique FC (Benin)	6–0	(Guinea-Bissau) UD Internacional	5–0	0–1
USC Bassam (Ivory Coast)	2–1	(Mali) AS Biton	1–0	1–1
Olympique Kakandé (Guinea)	1–5	(Nigeria) New Nigerian Bank FC	0–2	3–1

== Intermediary Round ==
Team 1	Agg.	Team 2	1st leg	2nd leg
Real Republicans (Sierra Leone)	2–1	(Benin) Requins de l'Atlantique FC	2–0	1–0
New Nigerian Bank FC (Nigeria)	2–0	(Togo) ASFOSA Lomé	1–0	0–1
USC Bassam (Ivory Coast)	2–2 (a)	(Ghana) Sekondi Hasaacas	2–1	1–0
SEIB Djourbel (Senegal)	1–4	(Ghana) Great Olympics	1–3	0-1

== Semifinals ==
Team 1	Agg.	Team 2	1st leg	2nd leg
Requins de l'Atlantique FC	1–5	(Nigeria) New Nigerian Bank FC	1–1	4–0
Sekondi Hasaacas FC (Ghana)	1–0	(Ghana) Great Olympics	0–0	0–1

== Finals ==
Team 1	Agg.	Team 2	1st leg	2nd leg
New Nigerian Bank FC (Nigeria)	2–0	(Ghana) Sekondi Hasaacas	2–0	0–0

== Winners ==
1983 WAFU Club Championship
(Nigeria)
New Nigerian Bank FC
First title

== See also ==
- 1983 African Cup of Champions Clubs
- 1983 CAF Cup Winners' Cup
