= Vincent Angban =

Ivorian footballer (born 1985)

Personal information
- Full name: Vincent Atchouailou de Paul Angban
- Date of birth: 2 February 1985 (age 41)
- Place of birth: Yamoussoukro, Ivory Coast
- Height: 1.84 m (6 ft 0 in)
- Position: Goalkeeper

Youth career
- –2004: Sylla Frères

Senior career*
| Years | Team | Apps | (Gls) |
| 2004–2006 | Rio Sports | | |
| 2006–2007 | Sabé Sports | | |
| 2007–2011 | ASEC Mimosas | | |
| 2011–2013 | Jeunesse | | |
| 2013–2014 | AFAD Djékanou | | |
| 2014–2015 | Africa Sports | | |
| 2015–2017 | Simba SC | | |

International career^{‡}
| 2005 | Ivory Coast U-20 | | |
| 2008 | Ivory Coast U-23 | | |
| 2008 | Ivory Coast | 2 | (0) |
- * Club domestic league appearances and goals as of 31 August 2007 ‡ National team caps and goals as of 15 January 2010

Vincent Atchouailou de Paul Angban (born 2 February 1985) is an Ivorian footballer who played as a goalkeeper.

== Club career ==
=== Rio Sports and Sabé Sports ===
Angban began his career in Rio Sport d'Anyama and was promoted to the first team in 2005. He left after two years in Anyama. Angban joined Sabé Sports for the 2006–07 season.

=== ASEC Mimosas ===
In 2007, Angban joined ASEC Mimosas. There, he was the first-choice goalkeeper until the beginning of the 2009 season, when Daniel Yeboah replaced him due to an injury. Yeboah convinced the manager of his qualities and stayed on the pitch when Angban was fit again. At the end of his contract with ASEC, Angban had trials with Africa Sports, Séwé Sports, Montreal Impact and Jeunesse, before signing permanently for Jeunesse.

=== Jeunesse Club d'Abidjan ===
Angban signed for Jeunesse, ASEC's rivals, after a successful trial at the end of his ASEC spell.

=== Later career ===
Angban played later for AFAD Djékanou, Africa Sports d'Abidjan and Simba Sports Club.

== International career ==
Angban formerly played with the Ivory Coast at African U-20 Championship 2005 in Benin. He represented his country at the 2008 Olympic Games.

== Early and personal life ==
Angban was born on 2 January 1985, in Yamoussoukro. His younger brother, Victorien, is also a footballer. He plays as a midfielder for Ligue 1 club FC Metz.
