= Christophe Aïfimi =

Beninese footballer

Personal information
- Full name: Adelhbola Christophe Aïfimi
- Date of birth: 21 August 1989 (age 37)
- Place of birth: Benin
- Height: 1.85 m (6 ft 1 in)
- Position: Goalkeeper

Team information
- Current team: Stella Club

Senior career*
Years	Team	Apps	(Gls)
2008–2014	Stella Club		
2014–2016	Tanda		
2017	Durban FC		
2017–2018	Black Leopards	16	(0)
2019	Gagnoa		
2020	Futuro Kings		
2020-2023	Stella Club		
- * Club domestic league appearances and goals as of 14:42, 17 April 2026 (UTC)

Adelhbola Christophe Aïfimi (born 21 August 1989), known as Christophe Aïfimi, is a Beninese footballer who played as a goalkeeper for several African teams. He most recently played for Stella Club until his retirement in 2023.

He is a native of Sakété.
