= Drissa Diarrassouba =

Ivorian footballer (born 1994)

Personal information
- Date of birth: 15 November 1994 (age 31)
- Place of birth: Abidjan, Ivory Coast
- Height: 1.74 m (5 ft 9 in)
- Position: Forward

Team information
- Current team: Eding Sport

Youth career
- 2009–2011: Ivoire Academie
- 2011–2013: Stoke City
- 2014: BK Häcken
- 2014–2015: Ivoire Academie

Senior career*
Years	Team	Apps	(Gls)
2014–2015	→ Shirak Gyumri (loan)	27	(6)
2016	Shirak Gyumri	11	(5)
2016–2017	Padideh	17	(2)
2018	Pyunik	12	(5)
2018	Gandzasar Kapan	12	(2)
2021–2022	Stade d'Abidjan		
2022	Bahla Club		
2023–	Eding Sport		

International career
2011	Ivory Coast U17	8	(4)
- * Club domestic league appearances and goals

Drissa Diarrassouba (born 15 November 1994) is an Ivorian professional footballer who plays as a forward, and is a former Ivory Coast national youth player.

== Club career ==
Diarrassouba was born in Abidjan, Ivory Coast.

=== FC Shirak ===
Diarrassouba joined the Armenian Premier League side FC Shirak in 2014.

In January 2016, Diarrassouba signed a three-year contract with Shirak.

=== Padideh ===
Drissa joined the Persian Gulf Pro League side Padideh on 29 July 2016 with a one-year contract.

=== Pyunik ===
Diarrassouba left FC Pyunik on 3 August 2018.

=== Gandzasar Kapan ===
In August 2018, Diarrassouba joined Gandzasar Kapan.
