= Stade d'Issia =

Multi-use stadium in Ivory Coast

Coordinates: 6°29′25″N 6°35′30″W

Stade d'Issia is a multi-use stadium in Issia, Côte d'Ivoire. It is currently used mostly for football matches and it also has facilities for athletics and was Côte d'Ivoire Premier Division, also was part of CAF Confederation Cup 2008. The stadium is the home place from Issia Wazi.
