= Eloka =

- Village
- Location in Ivory Coast
- Coordinates: 5°18′N 3°45′W
- Country: Ivory Coast
- District: Abidjan
- Sub-prefecture: Bingerville
- Time zone: UTC+0 (GMT)

Eloka is a village in south-eastern Ivory Coast. It is in the sub-prefecture of Bingerville in the Autonomous District of Abidjan. Prior to 2011, it was in the Abidjan Department, Lagunes Region.

Eloka was a commune until March 2012, when it became one of 1,126 communes nationwide to be abolished.

Eloka is famous for a French Council of State judgement of 1921 (when Ivory Coast was part of French West Africa), known as the "Le Bac d'Eloka" ("The Eloka boat"), which determined the public liability of government institutions for torts committed by public service concessionaires.
