= Cyriac =

Ivorian footballer (born 1990)

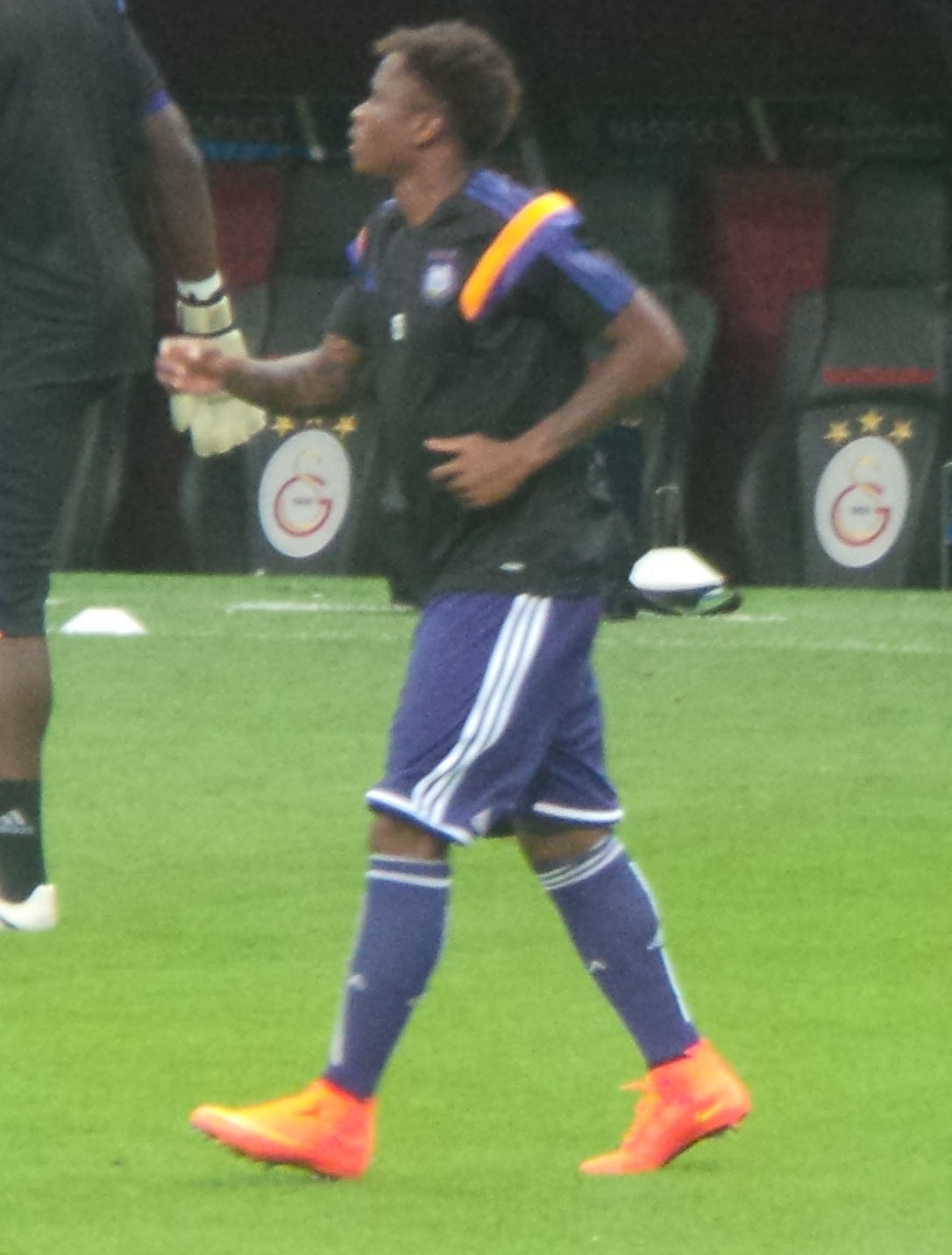

Personal information
- Full name: Gohi Bi Zoro Cyriac Sede
- Date of birth: 15 August 1990 (age 36)
- Place of birth: Daloa, Ivory Coast
- Height: 1.72 m (5 ft 8 in)
- Position: Forward

Youth career
- 2004–2007: ASEC Mimosas

Senior career*
Years	Team	Apps	(Gls)
2007–2008	ASEC Mimosas	24	(8)
2008–2009	Charlton Athletic	0	(0)
2009–2012	Standard Liège	48	(16)
2012–2015	Anderlecht	50	(8)
2015–2017	Oostende	54	(18)
2017	→ Fulham (loan)	9	(1)
2017–2019	Sivasspor	25	(2)
2019	→ Giresunspor (loan)	3	(0)
2021–2022	URSL Visé	0	(0)

International career^{‡}
2013–2017	Ivory Coast	9	(2)
- * Club domestic league appearances and goals as of 07:08, 20 December 2021 (UTC) ‡ National team caps and goals as of 4 April 2017

Gohi Bi Zoro Cyriac Sede (born 15 August 1990), known mononymously as Cyriac, is an Ivorian professional footballer who plays as a forward.

== Club career ==
In March 2004, Cyriac joined ASEC Mimosas. He was a topscorer of Côte d'Ivoire Premier Division in 2008 season. He moved to Charlton Athletic in 2008 as part of a partnership with ASEC, but was unable to obtain a work permit, and on 31 January 2009, he moved to Standard Liège signing a five-year contract with Belgian champions. On 2 July 2012, he signed a four-year contract with RSC Anderlecht.

Having joined Oostende in 2015, Cyriac left for Fulham on 31 January 2017 for the rest of the 2016–17 season. He scored his only goal for Fulham in a 2–2 draw with Blackburn Rovers on 14 March 2017.

In July 2021, Cyriac signed with URSL Visé competing in the third-tier Belgian National Division 1. He left the club in January 2022.

== International career ==
Cyriac made his debut for Ivory Coast in a friendly against Mexico in August 2013. His first goal for his country came in November 2015, in a World Cup qualifying win over Liberia.

== Career statistics ==
Scores and results list Ivory Coast's goal tally first, score column indicates score after each Cyriac goal.

List of international goals scored by Cyriac
No.	Date	Venue	Opponent	Score	Result	Competition	Ref.
1	13 November 2015	Antoinette Tubman Stadium, Monrovia, Liberia	Liberia	1–0	1–0	2018 FIFA World Cup qualification	
2	27 March 2017	Stade Sébastien Charléty, Paris, France	Senegal	1–1	1–1	Friendly	

== Honours ==
Standard Liège

- Belgian Super Cup: 2009

Anderlecht

- Belgian Pro League: 2012–13, 2013–14
- Belgian Super Cup: 2012, 2013, 2014

Individual

- Côte d'Ivoire Premier Division top scorer: 2008
