= Wilfred Agbonavbare =

Nigerian footballer (1966–2015)

Personal information
- Full name: Wilfred Agbonavbare
- Date of birth: 5 October 1966
- Place of birth: Lagos, Nigeria
- Date of death: 27 January 2015 (aged 48)
- Place of death: Alcalá de Henares, Spain
- Height: 1.90 m (6 ft 3 in)
- Position: Goalkeeper

Senior career*
Years	Team	Apps	(Gls)
1983–1989	New Nigerian Bank		
1990	BCC Lions		
1990–1996	Rayo Vallecano	177	(0)
1996–1997	Écija	23	(0)

International career
1983–1994	Nigeria	15	(0)
- * Club domestic league appearances and goals

Wilfred Agbonavbare (5 October 1966 – 27 January 2015) was a Nigerian professional footballer who played as a goalkeeper.

He spent the better part of his career with Spanish club Rayo Vallecano, appearing in 189 competitive matches over six seasons (three in La Liga).

Agbonavbare was part of the Nigeria squad at the 1994 World Cup.

== Club career ==
In his country, Lagos-born Agbonavbare played for New Nigerian Bank and BCC Lions. In 1990, he moved to Spain where he would spend the rest of his career, starting with Rayo Vallecano in the Segunda División.

In his second season with the Madrid outskirts club, Agbonavbare appeared in all 38 league games (3,332 minutes of action, 27 goals conceded, second-best in the competition) as the team finished second and returned to La Liga after two years of absence. He continued to be first-choice in the following years, contributing 31 matches to another top-flight promotion in 1995.

Agbonavbare lost his starting position to Spanish international Abel Resino in 1995–96. In the following summer, he signed for second tier side Écija, being the most used player in his position but suffering relegation.

After one year in his country training to remain fit, Agbonavbare retired due to lack of offers at only 31.

== International career ==
Agbonavbare appeared with the Nigerian under-20s at the 1983 FIFA World Youth Championship in Mexico. He played for more than one decade with the full side, being selected for the 1994 African Cup of Nations and that year's FIFA World Cup, backing up Peter Rufai on both occasions.

== Personal life ==
Agbonavbare settled in the Community of Madrid after retiring, working as a delivery man, porter at the Madrid–Barajas Airport and goalkeeper coach of amateurs Coslada. In late January 2015, it was revealed that he was suffering from cancer, and he subsequently underwent treatment at the Hospital Universitario Príncipe de Asturias in Alcalá de Henares.

Both Agonavbare's former team Rayo Vallecano and opponents Atlético Madrid displayed a banner during their league match at the Vicente Calderón Stadium on 24 January that read "Fuerza Wilfred" (Come on Wilfred). He succumbed to the disease three days later, aged 48.

=== Racist abuse ===
In the 1992–93 season, Agbonavbare was the target of racist abuse from Real Madrid fans, who chanted Negro cabrón, recoge el algodón! (loosely translated "Motherfucking coon, go pick cotton!"). A middle-aged man was caught saying on live television that "that lousy damn nigger" and referee Juan Andújar Oliver were to blame for Real's defeat, much to the amusement of teenage supporters who shouted "Ku Klux Klan". One of them, a 13-year-old, angrily grabbed the interviewer's microphone and verbally threatened the player by saying: "Sunday, we'll go beat that son-of-a-bitch nigger up in Vallecas"; Rayo drew that match 1–1 at the Santiago Bernabéu Stadium, having previously won 2–0 in the reverse fixture.

When asked to comment about the events in the dressing room, Agbonavbare stated: "That's normal, I am dark-skinned and, having made many saves, I expected people to shout at me. But I am a footballer and this is nothing, I am very focused on [playing] my match". Rayo Vallecano dedicated a mosaic at the Vallecas Stadium to him, with the inscription "For your defence of the Sash and your fight against racism, we will never forget you".
