= New Nigerian Bank F.C. =

Nigerian football club

New Nigerian Bank F.C
- Full name: New Nigerian Bank Football Club
- Founded: 1970
- Dissolved: 1990

New Nigerian Bank Football Club was a Nigerian football team that played in Benin City. Originally known as Ethiope FC and based in Sapele, it was handed over by the Bendel State government to New Nigeria Bank and moved to Benin City in 1973. It would disappear from the map after its corporate owners started having liquidity problems when the first wave of financial houses crashes happened in the 1980s. The team was relegated in 1989 and disbanded soon afterwards.

== Achievements ==
- Nigeria Premier League: 1

1985

- West African Football Union (WAFU Cup): 2

1983, 1984

== Performance in CAF competitions ==
- African Cup of Champions Clubs: 1 appearance

1986: Second Round

== Former players ==
- Wilfred Agbonavbare
- Stephen Keshi
- Henry Nwosu
- Humphrey Edobor
- Augustine Igbinabaro
- Celestine Cliff (Midfield Maestro)
- Tijani Babangida
- Joseph Dosu
- Emmanuel Enemaro
- Edema Fuludu
- Eche Joshua
