= Coupe Houphouët-Boigny =

Côte d'Ivoire football competition

The Coupe Houphouët-Boigny is a match competition in Côte d'Ivoire football, played between the Côte d'Ivoire Premier Division champions and the Côte d'Ivoire Cup winners.

The competition is traditionally played on December 6. The official name of the trophy is Coupe Houphouët-Boigny. Starting from the 2004–05 edition, the trophy is disputed between the top 3 of the previous season and the cup winners.

From the 2010–11 edition the trophy is played in the next season.

== Finals ==
Are:

- 1975 : Mimosas
- 1976 : Sporting Club de Gagnoa
- 1977 : Stella Club d'Adjamé
- 1978 : Sporting Club de Gagnoa
- 1979 : Africa Sports
- 1980 : Mimosas
- 1981 : Africa Sports 1–0 Stella Club d'Adjamé
- 1982 : Africa Sports
- 1983 : Mimosas
- 1984 : Stella Club d'Adjamé
- 1985 : Stade d'Abidjan
- 1986 : Africa Sports
- 1987 : Africa Sports
- 1988 : Africa Sports
- 1989 : Africa Sports
- 1990 : Mimosas
- 1991 : Africa Sports
- 1992 not played
- 1993 : Africa Sports
- 1994 : Mimosas 4–2 Stade d'Abidjan (a.e.t.)
- 1995 : Mimosas 4–4 Stade d'Abidjan (3–2 pen.)
- 1996 : SOA
- 1997 : Mimosas 3–0 Africa Sports
- 1998 : Mimosas 2–0 Africa Sports
- 1999 : Mimosas 2–1 Africa Sports
- 2000–02 not played
- 2003 : Africa Sports 1–1 Stella Club d'Adjamé (4–2 pen.)
- 2004 : Mimosas 2–1 Stella Club d'Adjamé
- 2005 : Séwé Sport 4–1 Jeunesse Club d'Abidjan
- 2006 : Mimosas 1–0 Denguélé Sport
- 2007 : Mimosas 3–0 Issia Wazi
- 2008 : Mimosas
- 2009 : Mimosas
- 2010 : Jeunesse Club d'Abidjan 1–1 Mimosas (4–3 pen.)
- 2011 : Mimosas 2–1 Africa Sports
- 2012 : Séwé Sport 4–0 Stella Club d'Adjamé
- 2013 : Séwé Sport 1–0 Mimosas
- 2014 : Séwé Sport 2–0 Mimosas
- 2015 : Africa Sports 1–0 Tanda
- 2016 : Tanda 2–1 Séwé Sport
- 2017 : Mimosas 1–0 Africa Sports
- 2018 : Stade d'Abidjan 2–1 SC Gagnoa
- 2019 : SOA 3–0 San Pédro
- 2020–22 not played
- 2023 : Mimosas 1–0 AFAD Djékanou
- 2024 :
- 2025 : San Pédro 1–0 Stade d'Abidjan
- 2026 : Mimosas 2–0 CO Korhogo
