= Stade El-Hadj-Mamadou-Coulibaly =

Stadium in Côte d'Ivoire

Coordinates: 9°30′11″N 7°34′31″W

Stade El-Hadj-Mamadou-Coulibaly is a multi-use stadium in Odienné, Côte d'Ivoire. The stadium was built in 1972 when Odienné hosted Côte d'Ivoire's Independence Day celebrations. It is currently used mostly for football matches - it is the home ground of AS Denguélé - and political rallies. The stadium holds 3,000 people.
