= Gevorg Karapetyan =

Armenian footballer (born 1990)

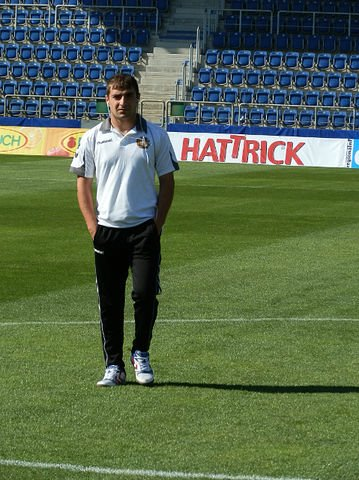
- Karapetyan with Banants in 2011

Personal information
- Full name: Gevorg Gagiki Karapetyan
- Date of birth: 10 June 1990 (age 36)
- Place of birth: Vedi, Armenia
- Height: 1.70 m (5 ft 7 in)
- Position: Forward

Senior career*
Years	Team	Apps	(Gls)
2007–2008	Ararat Yerevan-2	37	(10)
2009–2011	Ararat Yerevan	57	(22)
2012–2015	Banants	70	(12)
2015	Mika	12	(7)
2015	Mika-2	1	(0)
2015	Alashkert	0	(0)
2016	Orange County Blues	11	(1)
Total		188	(52)

International career
2011–2012	Armenia U21	6	(0)
- * Club domestic league appearances and goals

Gevorg Gagiki Karapetyan (Armenian: Գևորգ Գագիկի Կարապետյան; born 10 June 1990) is an Armenian former footballer who played as a forward.

== Club career ==
=== Youth ===
From 2007 to 2008, Karapetyan competed in the Armenian First League as part of the reserve squad of FC Ararat. He scored 10 league goals in 37 matches and appeared in three additional Armenian Independence Cup over that time.

=== Senior ===
For the 2009 season, Karapetyan was promoted to the first team squad at FC Ararat and stayed with the club until 2011. In total, he scored 22 goals in 22 matches as Ararat split time between the Armenian First League and Armenian Premier League. In 2012, he moved to FC Banants, also of the Premier League. He stayed with the club until 2015, scoring 28 goals in 70 league matches. He also appeared in several matches for the club in 2014–15 UEFA Champions League qualification. The following season, he played for fellow Premier League club FC Mika, making 12 appearances and scoring 9 and (2 for cup )goals. After his brief spell with Mika, Karapetyan signed with Alashkert FC. Although he never made a Premier League appearance for the club, he made several appearances for the club in 2015–16 UEFA Europa League.

In March 2016 it was announced that Karapetyan had signed for Orange County Blues FC of the United Soccer League, the third tier of the United States soccer league system ahead of the 2016 USL season. He started for the team against Vancouver Whitecaps FC 2 in the first match of the season but was substituted during the first half because of an injury. He originally impressed the club at an invitational camp held by the club in January 2016.

== International career ==
Between 2011 and 2012 Karapetyan represented Armenia at the under-21 level as part of the squad that participated in 2013 European Under-21 Championship qualification. He appeared in six of the side's matches. In 2010, Karapetyan took part in the preliminary round of the 2011 UEFA Regions' Cup, scoring 2 goals in 3 matches while representing Malatya.

== Honours ==
Ararat Yerevan

- Armenian First League: 2010

Banants

- Armenian Premier League: 2013–2014
- Armenian Supercup: 2014
- Armenia Cup runner-up: 2014–2015
