= Stade Municipal d'Abidjan =

Multi-use stadium in Abidjan, Côte d'Ivoire

Coordinates: 5°20′31″N 4°01′08″W

- Stade Municipal d'Abidjan
- Interactive map of Stade Municipal d'Abidjan
- Full name: Stade Municipal d'Abidjan
- Location: Abidjan, Côte d'Ivoire
- Capacity: 1,100

Tenant
- Stade d'Abidjan

Stade Municipal d'Abidjan is a multi-use stadium in Abidjan, Côte d'Ivoire. It is currently used mostly for football matches and is the home ground of Stade d'Abidjan of the Côte d'Ivoire Premier Division, the Ivorian top division. The stadium has a capacity of 1,100 spectators.
