= École de Football Yéo Martial =

Ivorian football club

EFYM
- Full name: École de Football Yéo Martial
- Nickname: Jaune et Bleu
- Founded: September 7, 1997; 28 years ago
- Ground: Nouveau Camp Militaire d'Akouédo, Abidjan, Ivory Coast
- Capacity: 5,000
- President: Ervé Siaba
- Head coach: Yao Kouamé
- League: Ivorian Ligue 2
- 2014–2015: Ivorian Ligue 2, 9th
- Website: http://www.efym.ci/
Home colors	Away colors

École de Football Yéo Martial, also known as EFYM, is an Ivorian football team in Abidjan, Ivory Coast. They were promoted to the highest level of football in Ivory Coast, and play their games at 4,000 capacity Parc des Sports de Treichville.
