= ASC Ouragahio =

Ivorian football club

- Full name: ASC Ouragahio
- Founded: 23 April 2003
- Ground: Stade de Yamoussoukro; Yamoussoukro, Ivory Coast
- Capacity: 6,000
- League: Côte d'Ivoire Premier Division

ASC Ouragahio is an Ivorian football club. They play their home games at 6,000 capacity Stade de Yamoussoukro.

The club was founded on 23 April 2003.
