= ES Bingerville =

- Full name: Entente Sportive de Bingerville
- Founded: 1995 as A.S. Transporteurs
- Ground: Stade Municipal; Bingerville
- Capacity: 4,000
- Chairman: Bachir Diabaté
- Manager: Ibrahim Camara
- League: Côte d'Ivoire Ligue 2
Home colours

Entente Sportive de Bingerville (ES Bingerville or ESB) is an Ivorian football club based in Bingerville, they are a member of the Ivorian Football Federation Premiere Division.

== History ==
The club was founded in 1995 as A.S. Transporteurs Bingerville and renamed to Entente Sportive de Bingerville in the year of 1998. They play at the Stade Municipal. The club colours are white, red and yellow.

== Performance in CAF competitions ==
- CAF Confederation Cup: 1 appearance

2008 – First Round

== Current squad ==
Note: Flags indicate national team as defined under FIFA eligibility rules; some limited exceptions apply. Players may hold more than one non-FIFA nationality.

No.	Pos.	Nation	Player
—	GK	(Ivory Coast) CIV	Harouna Balboné
—	GK	(Ivory Coast) CIV	Adama Koné
—	GK	(Ivory Coast) CIV	Maurice Kouassi
—	DF	(Ivory Coast) CIV	Aboubakari Diallo
—	DF	(Ivory Coast) CIV	Yacouba Dao
—	DF	(Ivory Coast) CIV	Rouxel Dérou
—	DF	(Ivory Coast) CIV	Tiémoko Diomandé
—	DF	(Ivory Coast) CIV	Lia Aimé Kobéi
—	DF	(Ivory Coast) CIV	Alain Gbê
—	DF	(Ivory Coast) CIV	Ange Michael Pooda
—	DF	(Ivory Coast) CIV	Daouda Diarrassouba
—	DF	(Ivory Coast) CIV	Jeby Landry Koutchan
—	DF	(Ivory Coast) CIV	Aubin Angaman
—	MF	(Ivory Coast) CIV	Vincent Bléhou Méa
—	MF	(Ivory Coast) CIV	Acihélou Krécoumou

No.	Pos.	Nation	Player
—	MF	(Ivory Coast) CIV	Ange Pacôme Koffi Kouassi
—	MF	(Ivory Coast) CIV	Serges Kouakou
—	MF	(Ivory Coast) CIV	Elvis Daly Gbalé
—	MF	(Ivory Coast) CIV	Fiacre Tohoua
—	MF	(Ivory Coast) CIV	Vassindou Méité
—	MF	(Ivory Coast) CIV	Adama Coulibaly
—	MF	(Ivory Coast) CIV	N'dri Kouassi
—	FW	(Ivory Coast) CIV	Moïse Zegbé
—	FW	(Ivory Coast) CIV	Corbin Franck Guédegbé
—	FW	(Ivory Coast) CIV	Joël Zézé
—	FW	(Ivory Coast) CIV	Bossé Kévin Beugré
—	FW	(Ivory Coast) CIV	Karim Dindane
—	FW	(Ivory Coast) CIV	Drissa Koné
—	FW	(Nigeria) NGA	Azeez Adelanwa
—	FW	(Ivory Coast) CIV	Jean Franck Bomoi
