= JC d'Abidjan =

Ivorian football club

JC Abidjan
- Full name: Jeunesse Club d'Abidjan
- Founded: 1932
- Ground: Stade Robert Champroux; Abidjan
- Capacity: 10,000
- League: Côte d'Ivoire Premier Division
- 2010: 2nd
Home colours

Jeunesse Club d'Abidjan (JC Abidjan) is an Ivorian football club based in Abidjan.

== History ==
It was founded in 1932. They play at the Stade Robert Champroux. The club is current member of the Côte d'Ivoire Premier Division.

== Current squad ==
Note: Flags indicate national team as defined under FIFA eligibility rules; some limited exceptions apply. Players may hold more than one non-FIFA nationality.

No.	Pos.	Nation	Player
1	GK	CIV	Yao Agouman
2	DF	CIV	Oscar Kuyo
3	DF	CIV	Baha Kéïta
4	DF	CIV	Mathias Kassi
5	MF	CIV	Franck Dérou
6	MF	CIV	Jean-Eric Saboa
7	MF	CIV	Liofra Yéo
8	MF	CIV	Hevra Kouassi
9	FW	CIV	Aboubacar Camara
10	MF	NGA	Michael Ogundina
11	DF	CIV	Elie Stéphane Dohon
12	FW	CIV	Tchétché Kipré
13	FW	CIV	Drissa Touré
14	FW	CIV	Jean-Joël Koué Koué
15	DF	CIV	Aymard Kouhon
16	GK	CIV	Thomas N'Guettia

No.	Pos.	Nation	Player
17	FW	CIV	Guédé Doh
18	FW	CIV	Armand Boly
19	MF	CIV	Césaire Melan Wodje
20	MF	RWA	Duddy Birory
21	FW	CIV	Wadja Ehouman
22	GK	BEN	Jacob Dote
23	GK	CIV	Zikhai Dodoz
24	MF	CIV	Jean Orlin Goré
25	DF	NGA	Kassimu Aremu
26	FW	CIV	Aloukou Damine Digbenou
27	FW	CIV	Guy Eric Dano
28	FW	CIV	Konan Joël Yoboué
29	DF	GNB	Vincent Benvindo
30	DF	CIV	Germain Piot-Dho
40	GK	CIV	Vincent Angban

== Achievements ==
- Côte d'Ivoire Cup: 1

1963.

Final: 2008, 2010.

- Coupe Houphouët-Boigny: 1

2010.

== Performance in CAF competitions ==
- CAF Champions League: 1 appearance

2011 - withdrew in First Round

- CAF Confederation Cup: 2 appearances

2006 - First Round
2009 - First Round of 16

- CAF Cup: 1 appearance

2003 - Second Round
