= Odienné =

- Town, sub-prefecture, and commune
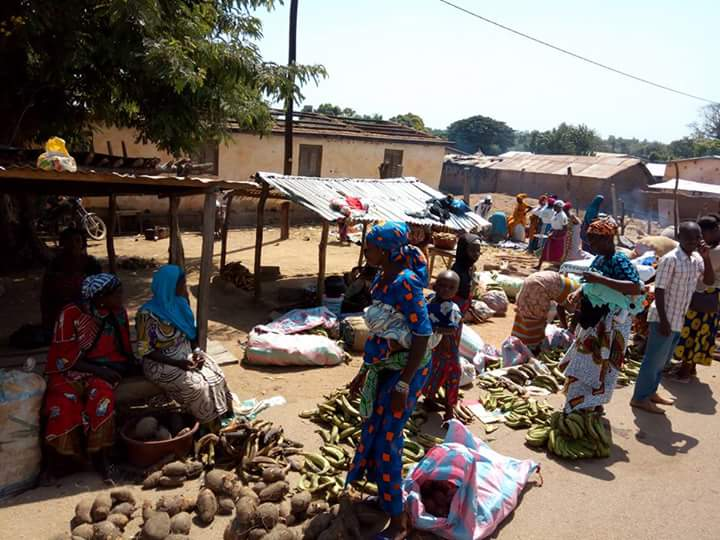
- Odienné market

- Location in Ivory Coast
- Coordinates: 9°30′N 7°34′W
- Country: Ivory Coast
- District: Denguélé
- Region: Kabadougou
- Department: Odienné Department

Area
  - Total: 1,630 km^{2} (630 sq mi)
- Elevation: 437 m (1,434 ft)

Population (2021 census)
  - Total: 86,279
  - Density: 52.9/km^{2} (137/sq mi)
  - Town: 42,173
- (2014 census)
- Time zone: UTC+0 (GMT)

Odienné (French pronunciation: [ɔdjɛne]) is a town in the northwestern part of Ivory Coast. It is the seat of both Denguélé District and Kabadougou Region. It is also a commune and the seat of and a sub-prefecture of Odienné Department.

The town of Odienné was founded by Malinké people under Vakaba Touré. Later, Samory Touré founded a support base in the town. Features of Odienné include a large mosque, nearby gold mines, and Vakaba Touré's tomb located in Odienné.

The town is served by Odienné Airport. The Stade Municipal is a multi-purpose stadium in the town. St. Augustine Cathedral serves as the cathedral and headquarters for the Roman Catholic Diocese of Odienné, of which Antoine Koné is the bishop.

== History ==
It is thought that the area surrounding Odienné was first settled by the Senufo people and the Mandinka people. The founding of the town is credited to Vakaba Touré (1800–1858), who also founded the Kabadougou Kingdom, of which Odienné was the capital. The French explorer René Caillié visited Odienné in 1827. In 1898, during the French occupation of Cote d'Ivoire, a military post was established south of Odienné. During the First Ivorian Civil War, Odienné was a stronghold for Forces Nouvelles de Côte d'Ivoire. Its remote location meant that the town was somewhat peaceful during the war compared to other Ivorian towns.

== Economy ==
Odienné relies on agriculture as its main industry. Fruits, cashews, yams, and cotton is grown in fields located in the Massif du Dienguélé valley. The town houses a rice-processing plant and manganese is also produced in the area.

== Sports ==
Stade Municipal is the primary stadium in Odienné, and is the home of AS Denguélé, the main football club, which currently plays in the Ligue 1 division.

== Climate ==
Climate data for Odienné (1961-1990 normals, extremes 1973-present)
Month	Jan	Feb	Mar	Apr	May	Jun	Jul	Aug	Sep	Oct	Nov	Dec	Year
Record high °C (°F)	49.5 (121.1)	41.8 (107.2)	42.4 (108.3)	47.0 (116.6)	39.4 (102.9)	38.8 (101.8)	39.0 (102.2)	43.0 (109.4)	39.0 (102.2)	42.0 (107.6)	40.0 (104.0)	41.0 (105.8)	49.5 (121.1)
Mean daily maximum °C (°F)	33.4 (92.1)	35.6 (96.1)	35.3 (95.5)	34.9 (94.8)	33.2 (91.8)	31.3 (88.3)	29.8 (85.6)	29.5 (85.1)	30.2 (86.4)	29.9 (85.8)	32.6 (90.7)	32.3 (90.1)	32.3 (90.1)
Daily mean °C (°F)	24.0 (75.2)	27.1 (80.8)	28.5 (83.3)	28.4 (83.1)	27.3 (81.1)	25.8 (78.4)	24.8 (76.6)	24.5 (76.1)	24.7 (76.5)	25.3 (77.5)	25.1 (77.2)	23.3 (73.9)	25.7 (78.3)
Mean daily minimum °C (°F)	14.7 (58.5)	18.4 (65.1)	21.3 (70.3)	22.3 (72.1)	21.9 (71.4)	20.9 (69.6)	20.5 (68.9)	20.3 (68.5)	20.4 (68.7)	19.8 (67.6)	18.2 (64.8)	14.8 (58.6)	19.5 (67.1)
Record low °C (°F)	9.8 (49.6)	10.7 (51.3)	10.0 (50.0)	12.0 (53.6)	18.0 (64.4)	15.0 (59.0)	12.1 (53.8)	17.5 (63.5)	12.6 (54.7)	10.5 (50.9)	9.0 (48.2)	8.0 (46.4)	8.0 (46.4)
Average precipitation mm (inches)	5.1 (0.20)	11.0 (0.43)	27.4 (1.08)	71.4 (2.81)	111.0 (4.37)	154.8 (6.09)	252.0 (9.92)	322.3 (12.69)	234.8 (9.24)	125.8 (4.95)	24.9 (0.98)	4.0 (0.16)	1,344.5 (52.92)
Average precipitation days (≥ 0.1 mm)	0.5	0.9	3.1	7.4	9.3	12.5	16.9	21.3	18.5	13.6	3.3	0.5	107.8
Mean monthly sunshine hours	242.0	220.2	217.3	214.7	248.8	221.8	183.5	174.5	185.4	235.8	252.0	242.6	2,638.6
Percentage possible sunshine	68	67	59	59	65	59	47	46	51	65	73	68	60
Source 1: NOAA
Source 2: WMO (precipitation 1981-2010)

== Villages ==
The 17 villages of the sub-prefecture of Odienné and their population in 2014 are:

1. Logbanasso (235)
2. Odienné (42 173)
3. Baradjan (357)
4. Bassékodougou (204)
5. Gbanhanla (967)
6. Gbèrèdougou (509)
7. Massadougou (201)
8. Kodougou (219)
9. Kouroukro-Mafélé (835)
10. Néguéla (406)
11. Niamasso (392)
12. Samesso (314)
13. Sirana (1 250)
14. Touroni (479)
15. Odienné-Sienso (809)
16. Samankoungolo (166)
17. Ziéwasso (990)

In 2014, the total population of the sub-prefecture of Odienné was 50,506.
