= Bingerville =

Town in south-eastern Ivory Coast

- Town, sub-prefecture, and commune
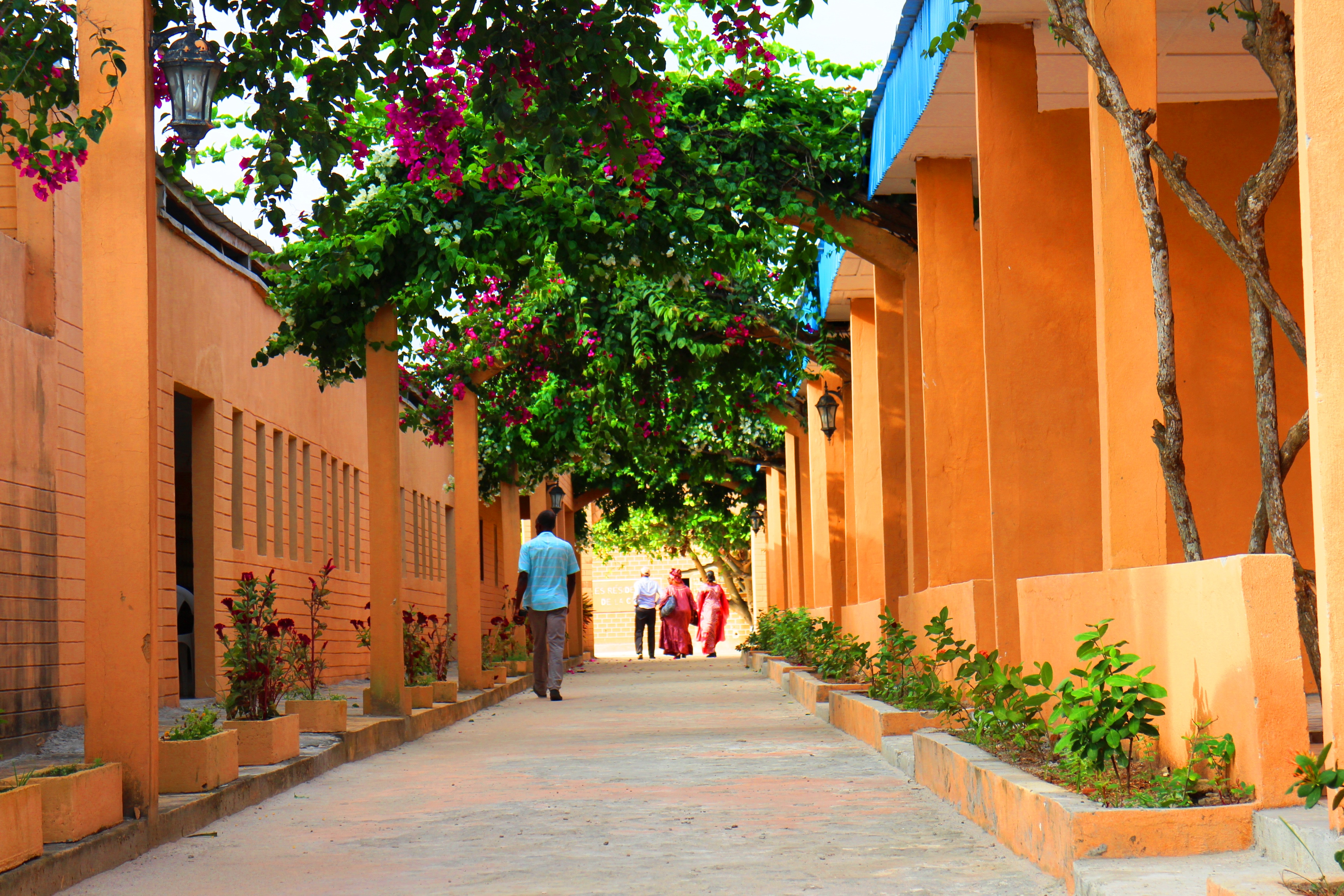

- Location in Ivory Coast
- Coordinates: 5°21′N 3°54′W
- Country: Ivory Coast
- District: Abidjan

Area
  - Total: 305 km^{2} (118 sq mi)

Population (2021 census)
  - Total: 204,656
  - Density: 671/km^{2} (1,740/sq mi)
  - Town: 64,015
- (2014 census)
- Time zone: UTC+0 (GMT)

Bingerville is a town in south-eastern Ivory Coast. It is a suburb of Abidjan city and one of four sub-prefectures of Abidjan Autonomous District. Bingerville is also a commune. The town is located about 10 kilometres east of Abidjan and lies on the Ébrié Lagoon. Villages in the sub-prefecture include Eloka.

Bingerville is home to École militaire préparatoire technique (EMPT), a military academy.

== History ==
Bingerville (13,000 BP) and Iwo-Eleru (11,000 BP) are the most early microlithic industries in West Africa.

Originally a market town, Bingerville grew as the capital of the French colony from 1909 until 1934. It is named after Louis-Gustave Binger, a former French colonial governor. Many colonial buildings survive in the town, which is also known for its botanical gardens.

Prior to the 2011 reorganisation of the subdivisions of Ivory Coast, Bingerville was part of the Lagunes Region.

== Notable people ==
- Mamadou Koné, footballer
- Wilfried Bony, footballer
- Eric Bailly, footballer
- Didier Drogba, footballer
- Badra Ali Sangaré, footballer
