= Sabé Sports de Bouna =

Ivorian football club

Sabé Sports
- Full name: Sabé Sports de Bouna
- Ground: Stade Municipal; Bouna, Ivory Coast
- Capacity: 1,200
- Chairman: Nicaise Kouamé
- Manager: Lucien Kassi-Kouadio
- League: Ligue 2 MTN
- 2010: 12, Ligue 1 MTN
Home colours

Sabé Sports de Bouna is an Ivorian football club based in Bouna.

== History ==
They club was a member of the Ivorian Football Federation Premiere Division and was 2010 relegated to the Championnat National de 2ème Division. They play at the Stade Municipal.

== Current squad ==
Note: Flags indicate national team as defined under FIFA eligibility rules; some limited exceptions apply. Players may hold more than one non-FIFA nationality.

No.	Pos.	Nation	Player
1	GK	CIV	Mohamed Gbané
2	MF	CIV	Elysée Zakpa
3	MF	CIV	Modibo Koné
6	DF	CIV	Youssouf Doumbia
7	MF	CIV	Crispin Junior Mé Kouakou
8	FW	CIV	Auscence Guy
9	FW	CIV	Bazoumana Diabaté
10	MF	CIV	Sidibe Toumani
11	MF	NGA	Ezerka Emou
12	FW	CIV	Koffi Adjoumani Blaise Dongo
13	FW	CIV	Mamadou Bamba
15	DF	CIV	Aimé Fidèle Opé
16	GK	CIV	Moussa Traoré
17	DF	CIV	Ibrahim Ouattara

No.	Pos.	Nation	Player
18	FW	CIV	Boniface Bamba
19	DF	CIV	Salimé Fofana
20	MF	CIV	Ousmane Diabaté
21	FW	CIV	Hamadou Diabaté
22	GK	CIV	Abou Ouattara
23	FW	CIV	Arsène Fabrice Djéhi Djokoua
24	MF	CIV	Arnaud Lasme
25	DF	CIV	Lanciné Sylla
26	MF	CIV	Koffi Aboutou
27	DF	CIV	Amadou Sanogo
28	FW	CIV	Molo Hilaire Assalé
29	FW	CIV	Assangoua Mobou
30	GK	CIV	Anzoumana Ouattara
31	FW	KEN	Guevara Alopo
