= Séwé FC =

Ivorian football club

- Full name: Séwé FC
- Nickname: Séwéké
- Founded: 1977; 49 years ago
- Ground: Stade Robert Champroux, Ivory Coast
- Capacity: 3,000
- Manager: Njoya Mesack Mauril
- League: Ligue 2
- 2025–26: 9th, Ligue 2 Group A
Home colours	Away colours	Third colours

Séwé Football Club (formerly Séwé Sport de San-Pédro, commonly referred to as Séwé Sport) is an Ivorian professional football club based in San-Pédro. They are a member of the Ivorian Football Federation Premiere Division. They play at the Stade Municipal.

The club rebranded as Séwé FC in March 2017.

== Current squad ==
Note: Flags indicate national team as defined under FIFA eligibility rules; some limited exceptions apply. Players may hold more than one non-FIFA nationality.

No.	Pos.	Nation	Player
—	GK	CIV	Akre Jean Vincent Ahouchi
—	DF	CIV	Honnadji Gboze
—	DF	CIV	Anebil Kodjo
—	DF	CIV	Ibrahim Koné
—	DF	CIV	Kouadio Jules Cesar Yoboue
—	MF	CIV	Hévra Kouassi

No.	Pos.	Nation	Player
—	DF	CIV	Mehoue Traoré
—	MF	CIV	Harouna Ouanni
—	MF	CIV	Souleymane Binaté
—	MF	CIV	Souleymane Dembélé
—	FW	CIV	Wawa Zadi
—	FW	CIV	Yao Koffi

== Honours ==
- Côte d'Ivoire Premier Division
  - Champions (3): 2011–12, 2012–13, 2013–14
- Côte d'Ivoire Cup
  - Champions: 2016
- Coupe Houphouët-Boigny
  - Champions (4): 2005, 2012, 2013, 2014

== Performance in CAF competitions ==
- CAF Champions League: 3 appearances

2007 – First Round
2013 – Group stage (Top 8)
2014 – Second Round
2015 – Preliminary Round

- CAF Confederation Cup: 4 appearances

2006 – First Round
2010 – First Round
2011 – Preliminary Round
2012 – Preliminary Round
2014 – Runner-Up
2017 –
