= Issia Wazy =

Ivorian football club

- Full name: Issia Wazy
- Ground: Stade d'Issia
- Capacity: 2,000
- League: Ligue 2
- 2025–26: 11th of 14 (Group B)
Home colours	Away colours

Issia Wazy is an Ivorian football club based in Issia, which competes in the Ligue 2, the second division of Ivorian football.

They used to play in the Ligue 1 until their relegation in 2020.

== Honours ==
- Coupe de Côte d'Ivoire: 1
  - Winner: 2005–06
  - Runner-up: 2006–07

== Performance in CAF competitions ==
- CAF Confederation Cup: 3 appearances
  - 2007 – First Round
  - 2008 – First Round
  - 2010 – Preliminary Round

== Notable players ==
- (Ivory Coast) Wilfried Bony
- (Ivory Coast) Cédric Gogoua
