= Stade d'Abidjan =

- Full name: Stade d'Abidjan
- Nickname: les Yéyés
- Founded: 1936; 90 years ago, as ASFI Abidjan
- Ground: Stade Robert Champroux; Abidjan, Ivory Coast
- Capacity: 5,000
- Chairman: Philippe Ndrakou
- Manager: Mathieu Kouassi
- League: Ligue 1
- 2025–26: 6th of 16
Home colours	Away colours

Stade d'Abidjan is an Ivorian football club based in Abidjan.

== History ==
It was founded in 1936 as ASFI Abidjan after fusion with PIC and OC Abidjan and called U.S.F. Abidjan, before was renamed in Olympique Club Abidjan, since 1959 played as Stade d'Abidjan. They play at the Stade Municipal d'Abidjan.

== Honours ==
- Côte d'Ivoire Premier Division: 6

1962, 1963, 1965, 1966, 1969, 2025

- Côte d'Ivoire Cup: 5

1971, 1976, 1984, 1994, 2000.

- Coupe Houphouët-Boigny: 2

1985, 2018.

- African Cup of Champions Clubs: 1

1966.

- West African Club Championship (UFOA Cup): 1

1977.

== Performance in CAF competitions ==
- African Cup of Champions Clubs: 3 appearances

1966: Champion
1967: Quarter-finals
1970: Quarter-finals

- CAF Confederation Cup: 2 appearances

2004 – Second Round
2005 – Second Round

- CAF Cup Winners' Cup: 5 appearances

1985 – First Round
1995 – Second Round
1996 – Second Round
1997 – First Round
2001 – Second Round

- CAF Cup: 1 appearance

2000 – Semi-finals

== Current squad ==
As of 9 November 2021

Note: Flags indicate national team as defined under FIFA eligibility rules; some limited exceptions apply. Players may hold more than one non-FIFA nationality.

No.	Pos.	Nation	Player
—	GK	CIV	Melagne Marcelin Wilfried Lepri
—	DF	CIV	Mohesso Duverne Dohi Anicet
—	DF	CIV	Kassoum Ouattara
—	DF	CIV	Jean Noël Sahié Groyou
—	DF	CIV	Brou Wilfred Freddy Sosthène
—	MF	CIV	Moussa Comara
—	MF	CIV	Ballet Felix Demisere Kiple

No.	Pos.	Nation	Player
—	MF	CIV	Lucien Yao
—	MF	CIV	Alou Diarra
—	FW	CIV	Kouame Luc Elie Tanoh
—	FW	CIV	Yves Auguste Kasso
—	FW	CIV	Ben Bangaly Koné
—	FW	CIV	Elie Dohon
—	FW	CIV	Aboudramane Diaby
—	FW	CIV	Wilfried Yessoh

== Managers ==
- (Ghana) Sir Cecil Jones Attuquayefio (1989–90)
