= AS Denguélé =

Ivorian football club

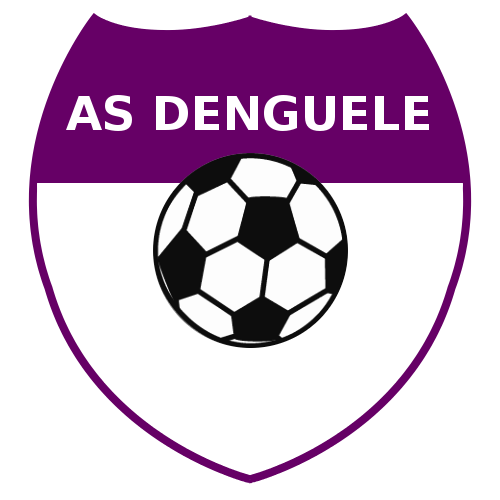
- Full name: Association Sportive Denguélé
- Nicknames: Odiennéka; les Nordistes
- Founded: 1972; 54 years ago
- Ground: Stade El Hadj Mamadou Coulibaly
- Capacity: 3,000
- Chairman: Abdoulaye Koné
- Manager: ?
- League: Ligue 2
- 2025–26: 12th th in Ligue 2, Group B
Home colours	Away colours

The Association Sportive Denguélé is an Ivorian football club based in Odienné. Being a member of the Ivorian Football Federation Premiere Division since 2003, their best result was a third place in 2006. Thereby, the club was allowed to participate in the CAF Confederation Cup, but failed to defeat the Gambian side Banjul Hawks FC in the preliminary round.

== Managers ==
- Sékou Fofana
- (Ivory Coast) Ben Sanou (2008–??)
- (Ivory Coast) Vassiriki Savané

== Performance in CAF competitions ==
- CAF Confederation Cup: 1 appearance

2007 – Preliminary round
