= Stella Club d'Adjamé =

Association football club

Stella Club
- Full name: Stella Club d'Adjamé
- Nickname: Les Magnans
- Founded: 1953; 73 years ago
- Ground: Stade Robert Champroux; Abidjan, Ivory Coast
- Capacity: 5,000
- Chairman: Guy Kouakou
- Manager: Dieudonné N'Goran
- League: Ligue 1
- 2025–26: Ligue 1, 7th of 14
Home colours	Away colours

Stella Club d'Adjamé is an Ivorian football club based in Abidjan.

== History ==
It was founded in 1953 in a fusion between Red Star, Etoile d'Adjamé and US Bella. They play at the Stade Robert Champroux.

== Notable players ==
- (Ivory Coast) Kouame Desré Kouakou
- (Ivory Coast) N'guessan Serges
- (Ivory Coast) Maguy Serges
- (Ivory Coast) Jean-Marc Benie
- (Ivory Coast) Kanga Gauthier Akalé
- (Ivory Coast) Franck Kessié
- (Ivory Coast) Gadji-Celi
- (Burkina Faso) Moumouni Dagano
- (Ivory Coast) Kandia Traoré
- (Ivory Coast) Jean-Jacques Gosso
- (Ivory Coast) Lézou Dogba
- (Ivory Coast) N'zi Laurent Thoscani
- (Ivory Coast) Evariste Kouadio
- (Ivory Coast) Ibrahima Fanny
- (Ivory Coast) Jean Louis Bozon
- (Ivory Coast) Penan Bruno
- (Ivory Coast) Abou Diomandé
- (Ivory Coast) Kouamé Binger
- (Ivory Coast) Koffi Konan Bébé
- (Ivory Coast) N'Zi Appolinaire
- (Ivory Coast) Kassi Jean Baptiste
- (Ivory Coast) Seydou Ouattara
- (Ivory Coast) Djiké Honoré
- (Ivory Coast) Tony Kouassi
- (Ivory Coast) Koffi N'Guessan Akpi
- (Ivory Coast) Aoulou Blaise
- (Ivory Coast) Bohé Norbert
- (Ivory Coast) Beugré Inago
- (Ivory Coast) Moshé Inago
- (Ivory Coast) Lorougnon Clément
- (Ivory Coast) Onébo Maxime
- (Ivory Coast) Youzan
- (Ivory Coast) Beugré Boli
- (Ivory Coast) Akoupo N'Cho Jonas
- (Ivory Coast) Abdoulaye Traoré Ben Badi
- (Ivory Coast) Konaté Losseni
- (Ivory Coast) Dié Foneyé
- (Ivory Coast) Gbizié Léon
- (Ivory Coast) Biady Nestor
- (Ivory Coast) Goro Sara Jules
- (Ivory Coast) Affly Dassé
- (Benin) Christophe Aïfimi

== Achievements ==
- Côte d'Ivoire Premier Division: 3

1979, 1981, 1984.

- Côte d'Ivoire Cup: 3

1974, 1975, 2012.

- Coupe de la Ligue de Côte d'Ivoire: 1

2015.

- Coupe Houphouët-Boigny: 2

1977, 1984.

- African Cup Winners' Cup: 0

Runners-up - 1975.

- CAF Cup: 1

1993.

- West African Club Championship (UFOA Cup): 1

1981.

== Performance in CAF competitions ==
- African Cup of Champions Clubs: 3 appearances

1980: Second Round
1982: Second Round
1985: First Round

- CAF Cup: 1 appearance

1993 – Champion

- CAF Cup Winners' Cup: 3 appearances

1975 – Finalist
1976 – Quarter-Finals
1977 – Quarter-Finals
