= 2023–24 CAF Champions League qualifying rounds =

- Dates: 18 August – 2 October 2023

Tournament statistics
- Matches played: 72
- Goals scored: 164 (2.28 per match)

The 2023–24 CAF Champions League qualifying rounds began on 18 August and ended on 2 October 2023. A total of 54 teams competed in the qualifying rounds to decide the 16 places in the group stage of the 2023–24 CAF Champions League.

All times are local.

== Draw ==
The draw for the qualifying rounds was held on 25 July 2023, 11:00 GMT (14:00 local time, UTC+3), at the CAF headquarters in Cairo, Egypt.

The entry round of the 54 teams entered into the draw was determined by their performances in the CAF competitions for the previous five seasons (CAF 5-Year Ranking points shown in parentheses).

Entry round	Second round (10 teams)	First round (44 teams)
Teams	(Egypt) Al Ahly (83 pts); (Morocco) Wydad AC (74 pts); (Tunisia) Espérance de Tunis (56 pts); (South Africa) Mamelodi Sundowns (51 pts); (Algeria) CR Belouizdad (36 pts); (Egypt) Pyramids (35 pts); (Tanzania) Simba (35 pts); (Angola) Petro de Luanda (33.5 pts); (Democratic Republic of the Congo) TP Mazembe (30.5 pts); (Guinea) Horoya (29 pts)	(South Africa) Orlando Pirates (24 pts); (Sudan) Al Hilal (23 pts); (Ivory Coast) ASEC Mimosas (20 pts); (Tanzania) Young Africans (20 pts); (Tunisia) Étoile du Sahel (20 pts); (Cameroon) Coton Sport (16 pts); (Democratic Republic of the Congo) AS Vita Club (14 pts); (Libya) Al Ahli Tripoli (12 pts); (Sudan) Al Merrikh (12 pts); (Morocco) ASFAR (10 pts); (Nigeria) Enyimba (10 pts); (Mali) Real Bamako (5 pts); (Togo) ASKO Kara (5 pts); (Uganda) Vipers (5 pts); (Republic of the Congo) AS Otohô (4.5 pts); (Angola) Primeiro de Agosto (4 pts); (Botswana) Jwaneng Galaxy (4 pts); (Algeria) CS Constantine (3 pts); (Niger) AS GNN (2 pts); (Libya) Al Ahly Benghazi (1.5 pts); (Mauritania) FC Nouadhibou (1 pt); (Benin) Coton FC; AS Douanes Burkina Faso; (Burundi) Bumamuru; (Comoros) Djabal; Djibouti Telecom; (Gabon) Centre Sportif de Bendje; (Ghana) Medeama; (Guinea) Hafia; (Equatorial Guinea) Dragón; (Eswatini) Green Mamba; (Ethiopia) Saint George; (Liberia) LISCR; (Malawi) Nyasa Big Bullets; (Mozambique) UD Songo; (Namibia) African Stars; (Nigeria) Remo Stars; (Rwanda) APR; (Senegal) Génération Foot; (Sierra Leone) Bo Rangers; (Somalia) Gaadiidka; (South Sudan) Salaam FC Bor; (Zambia) Power Dynamos; (Zanzibar) KMKM

== Format ==
In the qualifying rounds, each tie was played on a home-and-away two-legged basis. If the aggregate score was tied after the second leg, the away goals rule was applied, and if still tied, extra time was not played, and a penalty shoot-out was used to determine the winner (Regulations III. 13 & 14).

== Schedule ==
The schedule of the competition was as follows.

Schedule for the 2023–24 CAF Champions League qualifying rounds
Round	Draw date	First leg	Second leg
First round	25 July 2023	18–20 August 2023	25–27 August 2023
Second round	25 July 2023	15–17 September 2023	29 September – 1 October 2023

== Bracket ==
The bracket of the draw was announced by the CAF on 25 July 2023. The 16 winners of the second round advanced to the group stage.

First round					Second round
1	(Guinea) Hafia (a)	0	2	2
4	(Senegal) Génération Foot	0	2	2
4	(Senegal) Génération Foot	0	2	2	(Guinea) Hafia	1	0	1
					(Morocco) Wydad AC	1	3	4

First round					Second round
1	(Niger) AS GNN	—	—
4	AS Douanes Burkina Faso	—	—	w/o
4	AS Douanes Burkina Faso	—	—	w/o	AS Douanes Burkina Faso	0	0	0
					(Tunisia) Espérance de Tunis	1	0	1

First round					Second round
1	(Sierra Leone) Bo Rangers	1	1	2
4	(Liberia) LISCR	1	0	1
4	(Liberia) LISCR	1	0	1	(Sierra Leone) Bo Rangers	1	1	2
					(Algeria) CR Belouizdad	3	3	6

First round					Second round
1	(Ghana) Medeama (p)	1	0	1 (3)
4	(Nigeria) Remo Stars	0	1	1 (2)
4	(Nigeria) Remo Stars	0	1	1 (2)	(Ghana) Medeama	3	1	4
					(Guinea) Horoya	1	2	3

First round					Second round
1	(Zanzibar) KMKM	1	1	2
4	(Ethiopia) Saint George	2	3	5
4	(Ethiopia) Saint George	2	3	5	(Ethiopia) Saint George	0	0	0
					(Egypt) Al Ahly	3	4	7

First round					Second round
1	(Rwanda) APR	1	2	3
4	(Somalia) Gaadiidka	1	0	1
4	(Somalia) Gaadiidka	1	0	1	(Rwanda) APR	0	1	1
					(Egypt) Pyramids	0	6	6

First round					Second round
1	(Gabon) Centre Sportif de Bendje	1	1	2
4	(Burundi) Bumamuru	1	5	6
4	(Burundi) Bumamuru	1	5	6	(Burundi) Bumamuru	0	0	0
					(South Africa) Mamelodi Sundowns	4	2	6

First round					Second round
1	(Namibia) African Stars	2	0	2
4	(Zambia) Power Dynamos (a)	1	1	2
4	(Zambia) Power Dynamos (a)	1	1	2	(Zambia) Power Dynamos	2	1	3
					(Tanzania) Simba (a)	2	1	3

First round					Second round
1	(Mozambique) UD Songo	1	1	2
4	(Eswatini) Green Mamba	0	1	1
4	(Eswatini) Green Mamba	0	1	1	(Mozambique) UD Songo	1	1	2
					(Angola) Petro de Luanda	2	3	5

First round					Second round
1	(Equatorial Guinea) Dragón	0	0	0
4	(Malawi) Nyasa Big Bullets	2	1	3
4	(Malawi) Nyasa Big Bullets	2	1	3	(Malawi) Nyasa Big Bullets	0	0	0
					(Democratic Republic of the Congo) TP Mazembe	1	4	5

First round
1	(Libya) Al Ahly Benghazi	4	0	4
4	(Nigeria) Enyimba	3	0	3
3	(Benin) Coton FC	0	0	0
2	(Ivory Coast) ASEC Mimosas	0	2	2

Second round
(Libya) Al Ahly Benghazi	0	1	1
(Ivory Coast) ASEC Mimosas	0	2	2

First round
1	(Algeria) CS Constantine	0	0	0
4	(Tunisia) Étoile du Sahel	2	1	3
3	(Togo) ASKO Kara	0	0	0
2	(Morocco) ASFAR	1	7	8

Second round
(Tunisia) Étoile du Sahel	1	2	3
(Morocco) ASFAR	0	1	1

First round
1	(Mali) Real Bamako	0	2	2
4	(Cameroon) Coton Sport	0	0	0
3	(Mauritania) FC Nouadhibou	2	0	2
2	(Libya) Al Ahli Tripoli	0	1	1

Second round
(Mali) Real Bamako	0	1	1
(Mauritania) FC Nouadhibou	3	1	4

First round
1	(Angola) Primeiro de Agosto	1	1	2
4	(Democratic Republic of the Congo) AS Vita Club	0	1	1
3	(South Sudan) Salaam FC Bor	—	—
2	(Sudan) Al Hilal	—	—	w/o

Second round
(Angola) Primeiro de Agosto	0	1	1
(Sudan) Al Hilal	0	2	2

First round
1	(Republic of the Congo) AS Otohô	1	0	1
4	(Sudan) Al Merrikh (a)	1	0	1
3	Djibouti Telecom	0	1	1
2	(Tanzania) Young Africans	2	5	7

Second round
(Sudan) Al Merrikh	0	0	0
(Tanzania) Young Africans	2	1	3

First round
1	(Botswana) Jwaneng Galaxy	2	1	3
4	(Uganda) Vipers	0	2	2
3	(Comoros) Djabal	0	0	0
2	(South Africa) Orlando Pirates	1	3	4

Second round
(Botswana) Jwaneng Galaxy (p)	1	0	1 (5)
(South Africa) Orlando Pirates	0	1	1 (4)

== First round ==
The first round, also called the first preliminary round, included the 44 teams that did not receive byes to the second round.

Team 1	Agg.	Team 2	1st leg	2nd leg
Hafia (Guinea)	2–2 (a)	(Senegal) Génération Foot	0–0	2–2
AS GNN (Niger)	w/o (Note: AS Douanes Burkina Faso won on a walkover after Niger clubs withdrew from 2023–24 CAF interclub competitions due to the 2023 Nigerien coup d'état.)	AS Douanes Burkina Faso	—	—
Bo Rangers (Sierra Leone)	2–1	(Liberia) LISCR	1–1	1–0
Medeama (Ghana)	1–1 (3–2 p)	(Nigeria) Remo Stars	1–0	0–1
KMKM (Zanzibar)	2–5	(Ethiopia) Saint George	1–2	1–3
APR (Rwanda)	3–1	(Somalia) Gaadiidka	1–1	2–0
Centre Sportif de Bendje (Gabon)	2–6	(Burundi) Bumamuru	1–1	1–5
African Stars (Namibia)	2–2 (a)	(Zambia) Power Dynamos	2–1	0–1
UD Songo (Mozambique)	2–1	(Eswatini) Green Mamba	1–0	1–1
Dragón (Equatorial Guinea)	0–3	(Malawi) Nyasa Big Bullets	0–2	0–1
Al Ahly Benghazi (Libya)	4–3	(Nigeria) Enyimba	4–3	0–0
Coton FC (Benin)	0–2	(Ivory Coast) ASEC Mimosas	0–0	0–2
CS Constantine (Algeria)	0–3	(Tunisia) Étoile du Sahel	0–2	0–1
ASKO Kara (Togo)	0–8	(Morocco) ASFAR	0–1	0–7
Real Bamako (Mali)	2–0	(Cameroon) Coton Sport	0–0	2–0
FC Nouadhibou (Mauritania)	2–1	(Libya) Al Ahli Tripoli	2–0	0–1
Primeiro de Agosto (Angola)	2–1	(Democratic Republic of the Congo) AS Vita Club	1–0	1–1
Salaam FC Bor (South Sudan)	w/o (Note: Al Hilal won on a walkover after Salaam FC Bor failed to travel to Morocco.)	(Sudan) Al Hilal	—	—
AS Otohô (Republic of the Congo)	1–1 (a)	(Sudan) Al Merrikh	1–1	0–0
Djibouti Telecom	1–7	(Tanzania) Young Africans	0–2	1–5
Jwaneng Galaxy (Botswana)	3–2	(Uganda) Vipers	2–0	1–2
Djabal (Comoros)	0–4	(South Africa) Orlando Pirates	0–1	0–3

Notes:

20 August 2023
16:00 UTC+0

Hafia (Guinea)	0–0	(Senegal) Génération Foot
	Report

General Lansana Conté Stadium, Conakry
Referee: Alhasan Baboucarr Bass (Gambia)
27 August 2023
19:00 UTC+0

Génération Foot (Senegal)	2–2	(Guinea) Hafia
Al. Sy 47'; Gueye 62'	Report	M. Bangoura 15'; Andoulo 85'

Stade Lat-Dior, Thiès
Referee: Karim Sabry (Morocco)

2–2 on aggregate. Hafia won on away goals.

19 August 2023
16:00 UTC+0

Bo Rangers (Sierra Leone)	1–1	(Liberia) LISCR
Kabba 2'	Report	Jackson 35'

Southern Arena Stadium, Bo
Referee: Nurudeen Abubakar (Nigeria)
27 August 2023
15:30 UTC+0

LISCR (Liberia)	0–1	(Sierra Leone) Bo Rangers
	Report	Kalokoh 4'

SKD Stadium, Monrovia
Referee: Adaari Abdul-Latif (Ghana)

Bo Rangers won 2–1 on aggregate.

20 August 2023
15:00 UTC+0

Medeama (Ghana)	1–0	(Nigeria) Remo Stars
Sowah 22'	Report

Cape Coast Sports Stadium, Cape Coast
Referee: Vincent Kabore (Burkina Faso)
27 August 2023
16:00 UTC+1

Remo Stars (Nigeria)	1–0	(Ghana) Medeama
Alade 73'	Report
Penalties
	2–3

Remo Stars Stadium, Sagamu
Referee: Kouassi Frederic Francois Biro (Ivory Coast)

1–1 on aggregate. Medeama won 3–2 on penalties.

18 August 2023
16:00 UTC+3

KMKM (Zanzibar)	1–2	(Ethiopia) Saint George
Shukuru 74' (pen.)	Report	Demte 39'; Zeleke 51'

Azam Complex Stadium, Dar es Salaam (Tanzania)
Referee: Philip Brooke (Kenya)
27 August 2023
16:00 UTC+3

Saint George (Ethiopia)	3–1	(Zanzibar) KMKM
Tefera 49' (pen.); Zeleke 65'; Yalew 79'	Report	Shukuru 24'

Abebe Bikila Stadium, Addis Ababa
Referee: Andre Kolissala Mbangui (Central African Republic)

Saint George won 5–2 on aggregate.

19 August 2023
15:00 UTC+2

APR (Rwanda)	1–1	(Somalia) Gaadiidka
Mbaoma 48'	Report	Kagaba 33'

Kigali Pelé Stadium, Kigali
Referee: Dedjinnanchi Tanisla Ahomlanto (Benin)
24 August 2023
15:00 UTC+2

Gaadiidka (Somalia)	0–2	(Rwanda) APR
	Report	Apam 55'; Mugisha 89'

Kigali Pelé Stadium, Kigali (Rwanda)
Referee: Idris Mohammed Osman (Eritrea)

APR won 3–1 on aggregate.

19 August 2023
15:30 UTC+1

Centre Sportif de Bendje (Gabon)	1–1	(Burundi) Bumamuru
Ndwangou 2'	Report	Eldinho 1'

Stade de Franceville, Franceville
Referee: Jose Asangono (Equatorial Guinea)
25 August 2023
15:00 UTC+3

Bumamuru (Burundi)	5–1	(Gabon) Centre Sportif de Bendje
Eldinho 2', 6'; Shabani Valentin 49', 65', 75'	Report	Obibayi 4'

Azam Complex Stadium, Dar es Salaam (Tanzania)
Referee: Souleiman Ahmed Djama (Djibouti)

Bumamuru won 6–2 on aggregate.

19 August 2023
15:00 UTC+2

African Stars (Namibia)	2–1	(Zambia) Power Dynamos
Adiwo 25'; Kambanda 61'	Report	Boyeli 45'

Dobsonville Stadium, Johannesburg (South Africa)
Referee: Cregue Fleury Moukagni (Gabon)
26 August 2023
15:00 UTC+2

Power Dynamos (Zambia)	1–0	(Namibia) African Stars
Boyeli 30' (pen.)	Report

Levy Mwanawasa Stadium, Ndola
Referee: Luxolo Badi (South Africa)

2–2 on aggregate. Power Dynamos won on away goals.

20 August 2023
15:00 UTC+2

UD Songo (Mozambique)	1–0	(Eswatini) Green Mamba
Banda 6'	Report

Estádio do Zimpeto, Maputo
Referee: Fabricio Duarte (Cape Verde)
26 August 2023
15:00 UTC+2

Green Mamba (Eswatini)	1–1	(Mozambique) UD Songo
Danito 73' (o.g.)	Report	Mandiranga 46'

Estádio do Zimpeto, Maputo (Mozambique)
Referee: Noris Aaron Godfrey Arissol (Seychelles)

UD Songo won 2–1 on aggregate.

20 August 2023
16:00 UTC+1

Dragón (Equatorial Guinea)	0–2	(Malawi) Nyasa Big Bullets
	Report	Phodo 8', 35'

Estadio de Malabo, Malabo
Referee: Fitial Charel Just Kokolo (Congo)
27 August 2023
15:00 UTC+2

Nyasa Big Bullets (Malawi)	1–0	(Equatorial Guinea) Dragón
Nkene 67' (o.g.)	Report

Bingu National Stadium, Lilongwe
Referee: Wilhem Letukwafa Haitembu (Namibia)

Nyasa Big Bullets won 3–0 on aggregate.

20 August 2023
19:00 UTC+2

Al Ahly Benghazi (Libya)	4–3	(Nigeria) Enyimba
Taqtaq 8'; Obot 42' (o.g.); Salama 75'; Ali 90+5'	Report	Chijioke 3'; Owen 59'; Ndukwu 86'

Benina Martyrs Stadium, Benghazi
Referee: Nabil Boukhalfa (Algeria)
27 August 2023
15:00 UTC+1

Enyimba (Nigeria)	0–0	(Libya) Al Ahly Benghazi
	Report

Enyimba International Stadium, Aba
Referee: Messie Nkounkou (Congo)

Al Ahly Benghazi won 4–3 on aggregate.

20 August 2023
17:00 UTC+1

Coton FC (Benin)	0–0	(Ivory Coast) ASEC Mimosas
	Report

Stade de l'Amitié, Cotonou
Referee: Naim Hosni (Tunisia)
27 August 2023
16:00 UTC+0

ASEC Mimosas (Ivory Coast)	2–0	(Benin) Coton FC
Pokou 38', 72'	Report

Charles Konan Banny Stadium, Yamoussoukro
Referee: Rulisa Patience Fidele (Rwanda)

ASEC Mimosas won 2–0 on aggregate.

18 August 2023
20:00 UTC+1

CS Constantine (Algeria)	0–2	(Tunisia) Étoile du Sahel
	Report	Sidibe 71'; Jelassi 90+7' (pen.)

Chahid Hamlaoui Stadium, Constantine
Referee: Ibrahim Nour El Din (Egypt)
26 August 2023
16:00 UTC+1

Étoile du Sahel (Tunisia)	1–0	(Algeria) CS Constantine
Abdelli 11'	Report

Stade Olympique de Sousse, Sousse
Referee: Abdulwahid Huraywidah (Libya)

Étoile du Sahel won 3–0 on aggregate.

20 August 2023
15:00 UTC+0

ASKO Kara (Togo)	0–1	(Morocco) ASFAR
	Report	Diakite 18'

Stade de Kégué, Lomé
Referee: David Daouda Guèye (Senegal)
26 August 2023
20:00 UTC+1

ASFAR (Morocco)	7–0	(Togo) ASKO Kara
Aït Ouarkhane 14'; Ouro-Agoro 33'; Hammoudan 45+2', 45+4'; Diakite 50'; Tarkhatt 77' (pen.), 90+1'	Report

Stade de Marrakech, Marrakesh
Referee: Ahmed El Ghandour (Egypt)

ASFAR won 8–0 on aggregate.

19 August 2023
16:00 UTC+0

Real Bamako (Mali)	0–0	(Cameroon) Coton Sport
	Report

Stade du 26 Mars, Bamako
Referee: Younoussa Tawel Camara (Guinea)
27 August 2023
15:00 UTC+1

Coton Sport (Cameroon)	0–2	(Mali) Real Bamako
	Report	Nouhou Cissé 28'; R. Cissé 71'

Roumdé Adjia Stadium, Garoua
Referee: Yannick Malala Kabanga (DR Congo)

Real Bamako won 2–0 on aggregate.

20 August 2023
16:00 UTC+0

FC Nouadhibou (Mauritania)	2–0	(Libya) Al Ahli Tripoli
Faye 76', 90+1'	Report

Stade Cheikha Ould Boïdiya, Nouadhibou
Referee: Ousmane Diakate (Mali)
27 August 2023
18:00 UTC+3

Al Ahli Tripoli (Libya)	1–0	(Mauritania) FC Nouadhibou
Manzi 90'	Report

Cairo International Stadium, Cairo (Egypt)
Referee: Mahmood Ismail (Sudan)

FC Nouadhibou won 2–1 on aggregate.

20 August 2023
15:00 UTC+1

Primeiro de Agosto (Angola)	1–0	(Democratic Republic of the Congo) AS Vita Club
Tshibamba 71'	Report

Estádio Nacional da Tundavala, Lubango
Referee: Andofetra Rakotojaona (Madagascar)
27 August 2023
15:00 UTC+1

AS Vita Club (Democratic Republic of the Congo)	1–1	(Angola) Primeiro de Agosto
Imana 25'	Report	Mayamba 52'

Stade des Martyrs, Kinshasa
Referee: Alhadi Allaou Mahamat (Chad)

Primeiro de Agosto won 2–1 on aggregate.

20 August 2023
15:30 UTC+1

AS Otohô (Republic of the Congo)	1–1	(Sudan) Al Merrikh
Bidimbou 31'	Report	Angulo 2'

Stade Alphonse Massemba-Débat, Brazzaville
Referee: Patrice Milazare (Mauritius)
25 August 2023
15:00 UTC+2

Al Merrikh (Sudan)	0–0	(Republic of the Congo) AS Otohô
	Report

Stade Huye, Butare (Rwanda)
Referee: Jean Claude Ishimwe (Rwanda)

1–1 on aggregate. Al Merrikh won on away goals.

20 August 2023
17:00 UTC+3

Djibouti Telecom	0–2	(Tanzania) Young Africans
	Report	Aziz Ki 22'; Musonda 53'

Azam Complex Stadium, Dar es Salaam (Tanzania)
Referee: Tsegay Mogos Teklu (Eritrea)
26 August 2023
17:00 UTC+3

Young Africans (Tanzania)	5–1	Djibouti Telecom
Nzengeli 7', 90'; Konkoni 44'; Zouzoua 51'; Mzize 68'	Report	Mayor 84' (pen.)

Azam Complex Stadium, Dar es Salaam
Referee: Mathews Moonje Hamalila (Zambia)

Young Africans won 7–1 on aggregate.

20 August 2023
15:00 UTC+2

Jwaneng Galaxy (Botswana)	2–0	(Uganda) Vipers
Sesinyi 15', 77'	Report

Lobatse Stadium, Lobatse
Referee: Retselisitsoe David Molise (Lesotho)
26 August 2023
20:00 UTC+3

Vipers (Uganda)	2–1	(Botswana) Jwaneng Galaxy
Y. Sentamu 31', 45'	Report	Baruti 88'

St. Mary's Stadium-Kitende, Entebbe
Referee: Georges Gatogato (Burundi)

Jwaneng Galaxy won 3–2 on aggregate.

19 August 2023
15:30 UTC+3

Djabal (Comoros)	0–1	(South Africa) Orlando Pirates
	Report	Lepasa 89'

Stade de Moroni, Moroni
Referee: Easter Zimba (Malawi)
25 August 2023
19:30 UTC+2

Orlando Pirates (South Africa)	3–0	(Comoros) Djabal
Lepasa 25', 63'; Maswanganyi 58'	Report

Orlando Stadium, Johannesburg
Referee: Keren Yocette (Seychelles)

Orlando Pirates won 4–0 on aggregate.

== Second round ==
The second round, also called the second preliminary round, included 32 teams: the 10 teams that received byes to this round, and the 22 winners of the first round.

Team 1	Agg.	Team 2	1st leg	2nd leg
Hafia (Guinea)	1–4	(Morocco) Wydad AC	1–1	0–3
AS Douanes Burkina Faso	0–1	(Tunisia) Espérance de Tunis	0–1	0–0
Bo Rangers (Sierra Leone)	2–6	(Algeria) CR Belouizdad	1–3	1–3
Medeama (Ghana)	4–3	(Guinea) Horoya	3–1	1–2
Saint George (Ethiopia)	0–7	(Egypt) Al Ahly	0–3	0–4
APR (Rwanda)	1–6	(Egypt) Pyramids	0–0	1–6
Bumamuru (Burundi)	0–6	(South Africa) Mamelodi Sundowns	0–4	0–2
Power Dynamos (Zambia)	3–3 (a)	(Tanzania) Simba	2–2	1–1
UD Songo (Mozambique)	2–5	(Angola) Petro de Luanda	1–2	1–3
Nyasa Big Bullets (Malawi)	0–5	(Democratic Republic of the Congo) TP Mazembe	0–1	0–4
Al Ahly Benghazi (Libya)	1–2	(Ivory Coast) ASEC Mimosas	0–0	1–2
Étoile du Sahel (Tunisia)	3–1	(Morocco) ASFAR	1–0	2–1
Real Bamako (Mali)	1–4	(Mauritania) FC Nouadhibou	0–3	1–1
Primeiro de Agosto (Angola)	1–2	(Sudan) Al Hilal	0–0	1–2
Al Merrikh (Sudan)	0–3	(Tanzania) Young Africans	0–2	0–1
Jwaneng Galaxy (Botswana)	1–1 (5–4 p)	(South Africa) Orlando Pirates	1–0	0–1

17 September 2023
16:00 UTC+0

Hafia (Guinea)	1–1	(Morocco) Wydad AC
Damaro 45'	Report	Sambou 10'

General Lansana Conté Stadium, Conakry
Referee: Patrick Tanguy Vlei (Ivory Coast)
30 September 2023
20:00 UTC+1

Wydad AC (Morocco)	3–0	(Guinea) Hafia
Attiyat Allah 8'; Elhouni 24'; El Amloud 57'	Report

Stade Mohammed V, Casablanca
Referee: Djindo Louis Houngnandande (Benin)

Wydad AC won 4–1 on aggregate.

17 September 2023
16:00 UTC+0

AS Douanes Burkina Faso	0–1	(Tunisia) Espérance de Tunis
	Report	Tougai 27' (pen.)

Charles Konan Banny Stadium, Yamoussoukro (Ivory Coast)
Referee: Georges Gatogato (Burundi)
30 September 2023
17:00 UTC+1

Espérance de Tunis (Tunisia)	0–0	AS Douanes Burkina Faso
	Report

Stade Hammadi Agrebi, Tunis
Referee: Bamlak Tessema Weyesa (Ethiopia)

Espérance de Tunis won 1–0 on aggregate.

17 September 2023
16:00 UTC+0

Bo Rangers (Sierra Leone)	1–3	(Algeria) CR Belouizdad
Musa 12'	Report	Meziane 42'; Darfalou 47', 78'

Southern Arena Stadium, Bo
Referee: Joseph Odey Ogabor (Nigeria)
2 October 2023
18:00 UTC+1

CR Belouizdad (Algeria)	3–1	(Sierra Leone) Bo Rangers
Wamba 78' (pen.), 79', 90'	Report	Turay 9'

Miloud Hadefi Stadium, Oran
Referee: Mohamad Ali Moussa (Niger)

CR Belouizdad won 6–2 on aggregate.

17 September 2023
15:00 UTC+0

Medeama (Ghana)	3–1	(Guinea) Horoya
Babil 50'; Abdulai 66'; Asmah 69'	Report	Fofana 88'

Cape Coast Sports Stadium, Cape Coast
Referee: Mustapha Kechaf (Morocco)
30 September 2023
16:00 UTC+0

Horoya (Guinea)	2–1	(Ghana) Medeama
Mandela 27'; Keita 70'	Report	Sowah 24' (pen.)

General Lansana Conté Stadium, Conakry
Referee: Nabil Boukhalfa (Algeria)

Medeama won 4–3 on aggregate.

24 September 2023 (Note: The Saint George v Al Ahly match, originally scheduled to be played between 15 or 17 September 2023, was rescheduled to 24 September 2023 due to Al Ahly participation in the 2023 CAF Super Cup on 15 September 2023.)
20:00 UTC+3

Saint George (Ethiopia)	0–3	(Egypt) Al Ahly
	Report	El Shahat 29', 58'; Abdel Kader 90+3'

Cairo International Stadium, Cairo (Egypt)
Referee: Pousri Armi Alfred (Chad)
29 September 2023
19:00 UTC+3

Al Ahly (Egypt)	4–0	(Ethiopia) Saint George
Afsha 10', 39'; Kahraba 34' (pen.), 63'	Report

Cairo International Stadium, Cairo
Referee: Boubou Traoré (Mali)

Al Ahly won 7–0 on aggregate.

17 September 2023
15:00 UTC+2

APR (Rwanda)	0–0	(Egypt) Pyramids
	Report

Kigali Pelé Stadium, Kigali
Referee: Jean Ouattara (Burkina Faso)
29 September 2023
18:00 UTC+3

Pyramids (Egypt)	6–1	(Rwanda) APR
Fathi 16', 56', 61', 81'; El Karti 21'; Chibi 69'	Report	Mbaoma 86' (pen.)

30 June Stadium, Cairo
Referee: Abdel Aziz Mohamed Bouh (Mauritania)

Pyramids won 6–1 on aggregate.

15 September 2023
16:00 UTC+3

Bumamuru (Burundi)	0–4	(South Africa) Mamelodi Sundowns
	Report	Costa 11' (pen.), 36'; Nku 40'; Shalulile 79'

Azam Complex Stadium, Dar es Salaam (Tanzania)
Referee: Godfrey Nkhakananga (Malawi)
30 September 2023
18:00 UTC+2

Mamelodi Sundowns (South Africa)	2–0	(Burundi) Bumamuru
Mvala 11'; Mokoena 50'	Report

Lucas Moripe Stadium, Pretoria
Referee: Antoine Max Depadoux Effa Essouma (Cameroon)

Mamelodi Sundowns won 6–0 on aggregate.

16 September 2023
15:00 UTC+2

Power Dynamos (Zambia)	2–2	(Tanzania) Simba
Lakred 28' (o.g.); Mulombwa 74'	Report	Chama 59', 90+3'

Levy Mwanawasa Stadium, Ndola
Referee: Karim Sabry (Morocco)
1 October 2023
16:00 UTC+3

Simba (Tanzania)	1–1	(Zambia) Power Dynamos
Bocco 69'	Report	Boyeli 17'

Azam Complex Stadium, Dar es Salaam
Referee: Mutaz Ibrahim (Libya}

3–3 on aggregate. Simba won on away goals.

17 September 2023
15:00 UTC+2

UD Songo (Mozambique)	1–2	(Angola) Petro de Luanda
Reginaldo 83'	Report	Kinito 78', 86'

Estádio do Zimpeto, Maputo
Referee: Masixole Bambiso (South Africa)
30 September 2023
15:00 UTC+1

Petro de Luanda (Angola)	3–1	(Mozambique) UD Songo
Azulão 4'; Afonso 80'; Guedes 90'	Report	Banda 87'

Estádio Nacional da Tundavala, Lubango
Referee: Patrice Milazare (Mauritius)

Petro de Luanda won 5–2 on aggregate.

17 September 2023
15:00 UTC+2

Nyasa Big Bullets (Malawi)	0–1	(Democratic Republic of the Congo) TP Mazembe
	Report	Fofana 7'

Bingu National Stadium, Lilongwe
Referee: Mohamed Diraneh Guedi (Djibouti)
30 September 2023
14:00 UTC+2

TP Mazembe (Democratic Republic of the Congo)	4–0	(Malawi) Nyasa Big Bullets
Mondeko 5'; Likonza 12'; Fofana 20'; Ngimbi 39'	Report

Stade TP Mazembe, Lubumbashi
Referee: Mahmoud Nagy (Egypt)

TP Mazembe won 5–0 on aggregate.

18 September 2023 (Note: The Al Ahly Benghazi v ASEC Mimosas match, originally scheduled to be played on 17 September 2023 at Benina Martyrs Stadium, Benghazi, was rescheduled to 18 September 2023 at Stade Olympique de Sousse, Sousse (Tunisia) due to the Storm Daniel.)
15:00 UTC+1

Al Ahly Benghazi (Libya)	0–0	(Ivory Coast) ASEC Mimosas
	Report

Stade Olympique de Sousse, Sousse (Tunisia)
Referee: Mitiku Tewodros (Ethiopia)
1 October 2023
16:00 UTC+0

ASEC Mimosas (Ivory Coast)	2–1	(Libya) Al Ahly Benghazi
Karidoula 11', 39'	Report	Baleid 18'

Stade de la Paix, Bouaké
Referee: Pierre Atcho (Gabon)

ASEC Mimosas won 2–1 on aggregate.

16 September 2023
16:00 UTC+1

Étoile du Sahel (Tunisia)	1–0	(Morocco) ASFAR
Jelassi 67'	Report

Stade Olympique de Sousse, Sousse
Referee: Mohamed Adel (Egypt)
30 September 2023
19:30 UTC+1

ASFAR (Morocco)	1–2	(Tunisia) Étoile du Sahel
Zouhzouh 90+4'	Report	Naouali 20'; Aouani 64'

Stade de Marrakech, Marrakesh
Referee: Pacifique Ndabihawenimana (Burundi}

Étoile du Sahel won 3–1 on aggregate.

16 September 2023
16:00 UTC+0

Real Bamako (Mali)	0–3	(Mauritania) FC Nouadhibou
	Report	Mangane 35'; Amar 72', 88'

Stade du 26 Mars, Bamako
1 October 2023
17:00 UTC+0

FC Nouadhibou (Mauritania)	1–1	(Mali) Real Bamako
M. Koné 90' (o.g.)	Report	C. Keita 81'

Stade Cheikha Ould Boïdiya, Nouadhibou
Referee: Omar Abdulkadir Artan (Somalia)

FC Nouadhibou won 4–1 on aggregate.

17 September 2023
17:00 UTC+1

Primeiro de Agosto (Angola)	0–0	(Sudan) Al Hilal
	Report

Estádio Nacional da Tundavala, Lubango
Referee: Messie Nkounkou (Congo)
1 October 2023
19:00 UTC+1

Al Hilal (Sudan)	2–1	(Angola) Primeiro de Agosto
Muzmel 5'; Abdelrahman 35'	Report	Matias 85'

Ben M'Hamed El Abdi Stadium, El Jadida (Morocco)
Referee: Jean Jacques Ndala Ngambo (DR Congo)

Al Hilal won 2–1 on aggregate.

16 September 2023
15:00 UTC+2

Al Merrikh (Sudan)	0–2	(Tanzania) Young Africans
	Report	Musonda 61'; Mzize 78'

Kigali Pelé Stadium, Kigali (Rwanda)
Referee: Andofetra Rakotojaona (Madagascar)
30 September 2023
19:00 UTC+3

Young Africans (Tanzania)	1–0	(Sudan) Al Merrikh
Mzize 66'	Report

Azam Complex Stadium, Dar es Salaam
Referee: Tanguy Patrice Mebiame (Gabon)

Young Africans won 3–0 on aggregate.

17 September 2023
15:00 UTC+2

Jwaneng Galaxy (Botswana)	1–0	(South Africa) Orlando Pirates
Msendami 21'	Report

Botswana National Stadium, Gaborone
Referee: Rulisa Patience Fidele (Rwanda)
29 September 2023
19:30 UTC+2

Orlando Pirates (South Africa)	1–0	(Botswana) Jwaneng Galaxy
Makgopa 66'	Report
Penalties
	4–5

Orlando Stadium, Johannesburg
Referee: Celso Armindo Alvação (Mozambique)

1–1 on aggregate. Jwaneng Galaxy won 5–4 on penalties.

== See also ==
- 2023–24 CAF Confederation Cup qualifying rounds
