= 2023–24 CAF Champions League group stage =

International football competition

- Dates: 24 November 2023 – 2 March 2024

Tournament statistics
- Matches played: 48
- Goals scored: 82 (1.71 per match)

The 2023–24 CAF Champions League group stage began on 24 November 2023 and ended on 2 March 2024. A total of 16 teams competed in the group stage to decide the eight places in the knockout stage of the 2023–24 CAF Champions League.

== Draw ==
The draw for the group stage was held on 6 October 2023, 13:00 GMT (15:00 local time, UTC+2), in Johannesburg, South Africa. The 16 winners of the second round of qualifying rounds were drawn into four groups of four.

The teams were seeded by their performances in the CAF competitions for the previous five seasons (CAF 5-year ranking points shown next to every team). Each group contained one team from each of Pot 1, Pot 2, Pot 3, and Pot 4, and each team was allocated to the positions in their group according to their pot.

Pot 1
Team	Pts
(Egypt) Al Ahly	83
(Morocco) Wydad AC	74
(Tunisia) Espérance de Tunis	56
(South Africa) Mamelodi Sundowns	51

Pot 2
Team	Pts
(Algeria) CR Belouizdad	36
(Egypt) Pyramids	35
(Tanzania) Simba	35
(Angola) Petro de Luanda	33.5

Pot 3
Team	Pts
(Democratic Republic of the Congo) TP Mazembe	30.5
(Sudan) Al Hilal	23
(Ivory Coast) ASEC Mimosas	20
(Tanzania) Young Africans	20

Pot 4
Team	Pts
(Tunisia) Étoile du Sahel	20
(Botswana) Jwaneng Galaxy	4
(Mauritania) FC Nouadhibou	1
(Ghana) Medeama	—

== Format ==
In the group stage, each group was played on a home-and-away round-robin basis. The winners and runners-up of each group advanced to the quarter-finals of the knockout stage.

=== Tiebreakers ===
The teams were ranked according to points (3 points for a win, 1 point for a draw, 0 points for a loss). If tied on points, tiebreakers were applied in the following order (Regulations III. 20 & 21):

1. Points in head-to-head matches among tied teams;
2. Goal difference in head-to-head matches among tied teams;
3. Goals scored in head-to-head matches among tied teams;
4. Away goals scored in head-to-head matches among tied teams;
5. If more than two teams were tied, and after applying all head-to-head criteria above, a subset of teams were still tied, all head-to-head criteria above were reapplied exclusively to this subset of teams;
6. Goal difference in all group matches;
7. Goals scored in all group matches;
8. Away goals scored in all group matches;
9. Drawing of lots.

== Schedule ==
The schedule of each matchday was as follows.

Matchday	Dates	Matches
Matchday 1	24–25 November 2023	Team 1 vs. Team 4, Team 2 vs. Team 3
Matchday 2	1–2 December 2023	Team 3 vs. Team 1, Team 4 vs. Team 2
Matchday 3	8–9 December 2023	Team 4 vs. Team 3, Team 1 vs. Team 2
Matchday 4	19 December 2023	Team 3 vs. Team 4, Team 2 vs. Team 1
Matchday 5	23–24 February 2024	Team 4 vs. Team 1, Team 3 vs. Team 2
Matchday 6	1–2 March 2024	Team 1 vs. Team 3, Team 2 vs. Team 4

== Groups ==
All times are local.

=== Group A ===
Pos	Team	Pld	W	D	L	GF	GA	GD	Pts	Qualification	SUN	TPM	NDB	PYR
1	(South Africa) Mamelodi Sundowns	6	4	1	1	7	1	+6	13	Advance to knockout stage	—	1–0	3–0	0–0
2	(Democratic Republic of the Congo) TP Mazembe	6	3	1	2	6	2	+4	10	Advance to knockout stage	1–0	—	2–0	3–0
3	(Mauritania) FC Nouadhibou	6	1	2	3	4	9	−5	5 (Note: Ranked on head-to-head points: FC Nouadhibou 4, Pyramids 1.)		0–2	0–0	—	2–0
4	(Egypt) Pyramids	6	1	2	3	3	8	−5	5		0–1	1–0	2–2	—

Source: CAF
Rules for classification: Group stage tiebreakers
Notes:
24 November 2023
18:00 UTC+2

Pyramids (Egypt)	1–0	(Democratic Republic of the Congo) TP Mazembe
Lakay 54'	Report

30 June Stadium, Cairo
Referee: Peter Waweru (Kenya)
26 November 2023
15:00 UTC+2

Mamelodi Sundowns (South Africa)	3–0	(Mauritania) FC Nouadhibou
Costa 22'; Shalulile 28'; Sirino 74'	Report

Loftus Versfeld Stadium, Pretoria
Referee: Youcef Gamouh (Algeria)

2 December 2023
15:00 UTC+2

TP Mazembe (Democratic Republic of the Congo)	1–0	(South Africa) Mamelodi Sundowns
Likonza 60'	Report

Stade TP Mazembe, Lubumbashi
Referee: Redouane Jiyed (Morocco)
2 December 2023
16:00 UTC+0

FC Nouadhibou (Mauritania)	2–0	(Egypt) Pyramids
Amar 4'; Oubeid 90+4'	Report

Stade Cheikha Ould Boïdiya, Nouakchott
Referee: Bamlak Tessema Weyesa (Ethiopia)

9 December 2023
16:00 UTC+0

FC Nouadhibou (Mauritania)	0–0	(Democratic Republic of the Congo) TP Mazembe
	Report

Stade Cheikha Ould Boïdiya, Nouakchott
Referee: Mahmood Ismail (Sudan)
10 December 2023
15:00 UTC+2

Mamelodi Sundowns (South Africa)	0–0	(Egypt) Pyramids
	Report

Loftus Versfeld Stadium, Pretoria
Referee: Pierre Atcho (Gabon)

19 December 2023
15:00 UTC+2

TP Mazembe (Democratic Republic of the Congo)	2–0	(Mauritania) FC Nouadhibou
Fofana 80', 90+4'	Report

Stade TP Mazembe, Lubumbashi
Referee: Djindo Louis Houngnandande (Benin)
19 December 2023
18:00 UTC+2

Pyramids (Egypt)	0–1	(South Africa) Mamelodi Sundowns
	Report	Mokoena 17'

30 June Stadium, Cairo
Referee: Alhadi Allaou Mahamat (Chad)

24 February 2024
15:00 UTC+2

TP Mazembe (Democratic Republic of the Congo)	3–0	(Egypt) Pyramids
Beya 32'; Likonza 45+1'; Mwamba 90+2'	Report

Stade TP Mazembe, Lubumbashi
Referee: Daniel Nii Laryea (Ghana)
24 February 2024
16:00 UTC+0

FC Nouadhibou (Mauritania)	0–2	(South Africa) Mamelodi Sundowns
	Report	Kekana 21'; Lorch 90+1'

Stade Cheikha Ould Boïdiya, Nouakchott
Referee: Pacifique Ndabihawenimana (Burundi)

2 March 2024
15:00 UTC+2

Mamelodi Sundowns (South Africa)	1–0	(Democratic Republic of the Congo) TP Mazembe
Shalulile 38' (pen.)	Report

Lucas Moripe Stadium, Pretoria
Referee: Jalal Jayed (Morocco)
2 March 2024
15:00 UTC+2

Pyramids (Egypt)	2–2	(Mauritania) FC Nouadhibou
Mayele 73', 90+1'	Report	Bessam 64'; M'bareck 82'

30 June Stadium, Cairo
Referee: Jelly Alfred Chavani (South Africa)

=== Group B ===
Pos	Team	Pld	W	D	L	GF	GA	GD	Pts	Qualification	ASE	SIM	WAC	JWA
1	(Ivory Coast) ASEC Mimosas	6	3	2	1	7	2	+5	11	Advance to knockout stage	—	0–0	1–0	3–0
2	(Tanzania) Simba	6	2	3	1	9	2	+7	9 (Note: Ranked on head-to-head goal difference: Simba +1, Wydad AC –1.)	Advance to knockout stage	1–1	—	2–0	6–0
3	(Morocco) Wydad AC	6	3	0	3	3	4	−1	9		1–0	1–0	—	0–1
4	(Botswana) Jwaneng Galaxy	6	1	1	4	1	12	−11	4		0–2	0–0	0–1	—

Source: CAF
Rules for classification: Group stage tiebreakers
Notes:
25 November 2023
16:00 UTC+3

Simba (Tanzania)	1–1	(Ivory Coast) ASEC Mimosas
Ntibazonkiza 44' (pen.)	Report	Pokou 77'

Benjamin Mkapa Stadium, Dar es Salaam
Referee: Mohamed Maarouf Eid Mansour (Egypt)
25 November 2023
20:00 UTC+1

Wydad AC (Morocco)	0–1	(Botswana) Jwaneng Galaxy
	Report	Sesinyi 33'

Stade de Marrakech, Marrakesh
Referee: Omar Artan (Somalia)

2 December 2023
15:00 UTC+2

Jwaneng Galaxy (Botswana)	0–0	(Tanzania) Simba
	Report

Obed Itani Chilume Stadium, Francistown
Referee: Mustapha Ghorbal (Algeria)
2 December 2023
19:00 UTC+0

ASEC Mimosas (Ivory Coast)	1–0	(Morocco) Wydad AC
Karamoko 72'	Report

Felix Houphouet Boigny Stadium, Abidjan
Referee: Tanguy Mebiame (Gabon)

9 December 2023
15:00 UTC+2

Jwaneng Galaxy (Botswana)	0–2	(Ivory Coast) ASEC Mimosas
	Report	Karamoko 57', 79'

Obed Itani Chilume Stadium, Francistown
Referee: Mohamed Adel (Egypt)
9 December 2023
20:00 UTC+1

Wydad AC (Morocco)	1–0	(Tanzania) Simba
Draoui 90+5'	Report

Stade de Marrakech, Marrakesh
Referee: Abongile Tom (South Africa)

19 December 2023
16:00 UTC+3

Simba (Tanzania)	2–0	(Morocco) Wydad AC
Onana 36', 38'	Report

Benjamin Mkapa Stadium, Dar es Salaam
Referee: Pierre Atcho (Gabon)
19 December 2023
16:00 UTC+0

ASEC Mimosas (Ivory Coast)	3–0	(Botswana) Jwaneng Galaxy
Leibé 11'; Aka 80'; Karamoko 90+1'	Report

Felix Houphouet Boigny Stadium, Abidjan
Referee: Amin Omar (Egypt)

23 February 2024
19:00 UTC+0

ASEC Mimosas (Ivory Coast)	0–0	(Tanzania) Simba
	Report

Felix Houphouet Boigny Stadium, Abidjan
Referee: Lahlou Benbraham (Algeria)
24 February 2024
15:00 UTC+2

Jwaneng Galaxy (Botswana)	0–1	(Morocco) Wydad AC
	Report	Gaddarine 45+2'

Obed Itani Chilume Stadium, Francistown
Referee: Peter Waweru (Kenya)

2 March 2024
17:00 UTC+1

Wydad AC (Morocco)	1–0	(Ivory Coast) ASEC Mimosas
Lahtimi 18'	Report

Stade de Marrakech, Marrakesh
Referee: Abdel Aziz Mohamed Bouh (Mauritania)
2 March 2024
19:00 UTC+3

Simba (Tanzania)	6–0	(Botswana) Jwaneng Galaxy
Ntibazonkiza 8'; Jobe 14'; Denis 22'; Chama 76'; Chasambi 86'; Ngoma 89'	Report

Benjamin Mkapa Stadium, Dar es Salaam
Referee: Daniel Nii Laryea (Ghana)

=== Group C ===
Pos	Team	Pld	W	D	L	GF	GA	GD	Pts	Qualification	APL	EST	HIL	ESS
1	(Angola) Petro de Luanda	6	3	3	0	5	0	+5	12	Advance to knockout stage	—	0–0	1–0	2–0
2	(Tunisia) Espérance de Tunis	6	3	2	1	6	3	+3	11	Advance to knockout stage	0–0	—	1–0	2–0
3	(Sudan) Al Hilal	6	1	2	3	4	5	−1	5		0–0	3–1	—	1–1
4	(Tunisia) Étoile du Sahel	6	1	1	4	2	9	−7	4		0–2	0–2	1–0	—

Source: CAF
Rules for classification: Group stage tiebreakers
25 November 2023
17:00 UTC+1

Espérance de Tunis (Tunisia)	2–0	(Tunisia) Étoile du Sahel
Sasse 60'; Meriah 64' (pen.)	Report

Stade Hammadi Agrebi, Tunis
Referee: Mohamed Adel (Egypt)
25 November 2023
17:00 UTC+1

Petro de Luanda (Angola)	1–0	(Sudan) Al Hilal
Miguel 37'	Report

Estádio 11 de Novembro, Luanda
Referee: Samir Guezzaz (Morocco)

1 December 2023
19:00 UTC+3

Al Hilal (Sudan)	3–1	(Tunisia) Espérance de Tunis
Meriah 8' (o.g.); Abdelrahman 15' (pen.); N'Diaye 78'	Report	Sowe 59'

Benjamin Mkapa Stadium, Dar es Salaam (Tanzania) (Note: Al Hilal played their group stage home matches at Benjamin Mkapa Stadium, Dar es Salaam (Tanzania) and Benina Martyrs Stadium, Benghazi (Libya), instead of their regular home stadium Al Hilal Stadium, Omdurman, due to the 2023 Sudanese War.)
Referee: Issa Sy (Senegal)
2 December 2023
20:00 UTC+1

Étoile du Sahel (Tunisia)	0–2	(Angola) Petro de Luanda
	Report	Guedes 45+4', 67'

Stade Hammadi Agrebi, Tunis
Referee: Samuel Uwikunda (Rwanda)

8 December 2023
20:00 UTC+1

Étoile du Sahel (Tunisia)	1–0	(Sudan) Al Hilal
Mbé 88'	Report

Stade Hammadi Agrebi, Tunis
Referee: Daniel Nii Laryea (Ghana)
9 December 2023
20:00 UTC+1

Espérance de Tunis (Tunisia)	0–0	(Angola) Petro de Luanda
	Report

Stade Hammadi Agrebi, Tunis
Referee: Alhadi Allaou Mahamat (Chad)

19 December 2023
17:00 UTC+1

Petro de Luanda (Angola)	0–0	(Tunisia) Espérance de Tunis
	Report

Estádio 11 de Novembro, Luanda
Referee: Dahane Beida (Mauritania)
19 December 2023
22:00 UTC+3

Al Hilal (Sudan)	1–1	(Tunisia) Étoile du Sahel
N'Diaye 45+3'	Report	Barhoumi 90+2'

Benjamin Mkapa Stadium, Dar es Salaam (Tanzania)
Referee: Ahmad Imtehaz Heeralall (Mauritius)

23 February 2024
18:00 UTC+2

Al Hilal (Sudan)	0–0	(Angola) Petro de Luanda
	Report

Benina Martyrs Stadium, Benghazi (Libya)
Referee: Ibrahim Kalilou Traoré (Ivory Coast)
24 February 2024
20:00 UTC+1

Étoile du Sahel (Tunisia)	0–2	(Tunisia) Espérance de Tunis
	Report	Sasse 26'; El Ayeb 41'

Stade Hammadi Agrebi, Tunis
Referee: Samir Guezzaz (Morocco)

2 March 2024
20:00 UTC+1

Espérance de Tunis (Tunisia)	1–0	(Sudan) Al Hilal
Meriah 22'	Report

Stade Hammadi Agrebi, Tunis
Referee: Patrice Tanguy Mebiame (Gabon)
2 March 2024
20:00 UTC+1

Petro de Luanda (Angola)	2–0	(Tunisia) Étoile du Sahel
Toro 38'; Julinho 71'	Report

Estádio 11 de Novembro, Luanda
Referee: Peter Waweru (Kenya)

=== Group D ===
Pos	Team	Pld	W	D	L	GF	GA	GD	Pts	Qualification	AHL	YNG	CRB	MED
1	(Egypt) Al Ahly	6	3	3	0	6	1	+5	12	Advance to knockout stage	—	1–0	0–0	3–0
2	(Tanzania) Young Africans	6	2	2	2	9	6	+3	8 (Note: Ranked on head-to-head goal difference: Young Africans +1, CR Belouizdad –1.)	Advance to knockout stage	1–1	—	4–0	3–0
3	(Algeria) CR Belouizdad	6	2	2	2	7	6	+1	8		0–0	3–0	—	3–0
4	(Ghana) Medeama	6	1	1	4	3	12	−9	4		0–1	1–1	2–1	—

Source: CAF
Rules for classification: Group stage tiebreakers
Notes:
24 November 2023
20:00 UTC+1

CR Belouizdad (Algeria)	3–0	(Tanzania) Young Africans
Benguit 10'; Meziane 45+2'; Jallow 90+4'	Report

Stade du 5 Juillet, Algiers
Referee: Alhadi Allaou Mahamat (Chad)
25 November 2023
21:00 UTC+2

Al Ahly (Egypt)	3–0	(Ghana) Medeama
Kahraba 66'; El Shahat 75'; Mohsen 88'	Report

Al Salam Stadium, Cairo
Referee: Boubou Traoré (Mali)

1 December 2023
16:00 UTC+0

Medeama (Ghana)	2–1	(Algeria) CR Belouizdad
Lomotey 45'; Kamaradin 90+4'	Report	Benguit 39' (pen.)

Baba Yara Stadium, Kumasi
Referee: Lamin Jammeh (Gambia)
2 December 2023
19:00 UTC+3

Young Africans (Tanzania)	1–1	(Egypt) Al Ahly
Zouzoua 90+1'	Report	Tau 86'

Benjamin Mkapa Stadium, Dar es Salaam
Referee: Abdel Aziz Mohamed Bouh (Mauritania)

8 December 2023
16:00 UTC+0

Medeama (Ghana)	1–1	(Tanzania) Young Africans
Sowah 27' (pen.)	Report	Zouzoua 36'

Baba Yara Stadium, Kumasi
Referee: Mutaz Ibrahim (Libya)
8 December 2023
18:00 UTC+2

Al Ahly (Egypt)	0–0	(Algeria) CR Belouizdad
	Report

Borg El Arab Stadium, Alexandria
Referee: Peter Waweru (Kenya)

20 December 2023
16:00 UTC+3

Young Africans (Tanzania)	3–0	(Ghana) Medeama
Zouzoua 33'; Mwamnyeto 61'; Yahya 66'	Report

Benjamin Mkapa Stadium, Dar es Salaam
Referee: Redouane Jiyed (Morocco)
16 February 2024 (Note: The CR Belouizdad v Al Ahly match, originally scheduled to be played on 19 December 2023, was rescheduled to 16 February 2024 due to Al Ahly's participation in the 2023 FIFA Club World Cup in Saudi Arabia between 12 and 22 December 2023.)
20:00 UTC+1

CR Belouizdad (Algeria)	0–0	(Egypt) Al Ahly
	Report

Stade du 5 Juillet, Algiers
Referee: Samuel Uwikunda (Rwanda)

23 February 2024
16:00 UTC+0

Medeama (Ghana)	0–1	(Egypt) Al Ahly
	Report	El Shahat 48'

Baba Yara Stadium, Kumasi
Referee: Patrice Tanguy Mebiame (Gabon)
24 February 2024
19:00 UTC+3

Young Africans (Tanzania)	4–0	(Algeria) CR Belouizdad
Yahya 43'; Aziz Ki 46'; Musonda 48'; Gnadou 84'	Report

Benjamin Mkapa Stadium, Dar es Salaam
Referee: Boubou Traoré (Mali)

1 March 2024
18:00 UTC+2

Al Ahly (Egypt)	1–0	(Tanzania) Young Africans
El Shahat 46'	Report

Cairo International Stadium, Cairo
Referee: Djindo Louis Houngnandande (Benin)
1 March 2024
17:00 UTC+1

CR Belouizdad (Algeria)	3–0	(Ghana) Medeama
Benguit 27'; Wamba 42'; Jallow 84'	Report

Stade du 5 Juillet, Algiers
Referee: Bamlak Tessema Weyesa (Ethiopia)

== See also ==
- 2023–24 CAF Confederation Cup group stage
