= 2023–24 CAF Confederation Cup qualifying rounds =

International football competition in Africa

- Dates: 18 August – 1 October 2023

Tournament statistics
- Matches played: 64
- Goals scored: 150 (2.34 per match)

The 2023–24 CAF Confederation Cup qualifying rounds began on 18 August and ended on 1 October 2023. A total of 52 football teams competed in the qualifying rounds to decide the 16 places in the group stage of the 2023–24 CAF Confederation Cup.

All times are local.

== Draw ==
The draw for the qualifying rounds was held on 25 July 2023, 11:00 GMT (14:00 local time, UTC+3), at the CAF headquarters in Cairo, Egypt.

The entry round of the 52 teams entered into the draw was determined by their performances in the CAF competitions for the previous five seasons (CAF 5-Year Ranking points shown in parentheses).

Entry round	Second round (12 teams)	First round (40 teams)
Teams	(Egypt) Zamalek (39 pts); (Morocco) RS Berkane (37 pts); (Algeria) USM Alger (27 pts); (Nigeria) Rivers United (10 pts); (Republic of the Congo) Diables Noirs (5 pts); (Democratic Republic of the Congo) Saint-Éloi Lupopo (5 pts); (Angola) Sagrada Esperança (4 pts); (Egypt) Modern Future (2.5 pts); (Tunisia) Club Africain (2 pts); (Rwanda) Rayon Sports; (South Africa) SuperSport United; (Uganda) Kampala City	(Algeria) ASO Chlef; (Angola) Académica do Lobito; (Benin) Loto-Popo FC; (Botswana) Gaborone United; (Burkina Faso) EF Ouagadougou; (Burundi) Aigle Noir; (Comoros) Belle Lumière; (Djibouti) Arta Solar; (Equatorial Guinea) Cano Sport; (Eswatini) Young Buffaloes; (Ethiopia) Bahir Dar Kenema; (Ghana) Dreams FC; (Guinea) Académie SOAR; (Guinea) Milo FC; (Ivory Coast) AFAD Djékanou; (Kenya) Kakamega Homeboyz; (Liberia) Watanga; (Libya) Abu Salim; (Libya) Al Hilal Benghazi; (Madagascar) Elgeco Plus; (Mali) Stade Malien; AS Douanes Mauritania; (Morocco) FUS Rabat; (Mozambique) Ferroviário de Maputo; AS Douanes Niger; (Nigeria) Bendel Insurance; (Senegal) Casa Sports; (Seychelles) La Passe; (Sierra Leone) Kallon; (Somalia) Horseed; (South Africa) Sekhukhune United; (South Sudan) Al Merreikh Juba; (Sudan) Haidoub; (Sudan) Hay Al Arab; (Tanzania) Azam; (Tanzania) Singida Fountain Gate; (Togo) ASC Kara; (Tunisia) Olympique Béja; (Zambia) Maestro United; (Zanzibar) JKU

== Format ==
In the qualifying rounds, each tie was played on a home-and-away two-legged basis. If the aggregate score was tied after the second leg, the away goals rule was applied, and if still tied, extra time was not played, and the penalty shoot-out was used to determine the winner (Regulations III. 13 & 14).

== Schedule ==
The schedule of the competition was as follows.

Schedule for the 2023–24 CAF Confederation Cup qualifying rounds
Round	Draw date	First leg	Second leg
First round	25 July 2023	18–20 August 2023	25–27 August 2023
Second round	25 July 2023	15–17 September 2023	29 September – 1 October 2023

== Bracket ==
The bracket of the draw was announced by the CAF on 25 July 2023. The 16 winners of the second round advanced to the group stage.

First round					Second round
1	(Nigeria) Bendel Insurance (p)	1	0	1 (4)
4	(Algeria) ASO Chlef	0	1	1 (3)
4	(Algeria) ASO Chlef	0	1	1 (3)	(Nigeria) Bendel Insurance	2	0	2
					(Morocco) RS Berkane	2	1	3

First round					Second round
1	(Morocco) FUS Rabat	3	2	5
4	(Benin) Loto-Popo FC	0	0	0
4	(Benin) Loto-Popo FC	0	0	0	(Morocco) FUS Rabat	1	0	1
					(Algeria) USM Alger (a)	1	0	1

First round					Second round
1	(Senegal) Casa Sports	1	0	1
4	(Burkina Faso) EF Ouagadougou (a)	1	0	1
4	(Burkina Faso) EF Ouagadougou (a)	1	0	1	(Burkina Faso) EF Ouagadougou	0	0	0
					(Nigeria) Rivers United	0	2	2

First round					Second round
1	(Djibouti) Arta Solar	3	3	6
4	(Somalia) Horseed	0	0	0
4	(Somalia) Horseed	0	0	0	(Djibouti) Arta Solar	2	1	3
					(Egypt) Zamalek	0	4	4

First round					Second round
1	(Tanzania) Singida Fountain Gate	4	0	4
4	(Zanzibar) JKU	1	2	3
4	(Zanzibar) JKU	1	2	3	(Tanzania) Singida Fountain Gate	1	1	2
					(Egypt) Modern Future	0	4	4

First round					Second round
1	(Ethiopia) Bahir Dar Kenema (p)	2	1	3 (4)
4	(Tanzania) Azam	1	2	3 (3)
4	(Tanzania) Azam	1	2	3 (3)	(Ethiopia) Bahir Dar Kenema	2	0	2
					(Tunisia) Club Africain	0	3	3

First round					Second round
1	(Tunisia) Olympique Béja	0	0	0
4	(Libya) Abu Salim	1	0	1
4	(Libya) Abu Salim	1	0	1	(Libya) Abu Salim	3	2	5
					(Uganda) Kampala City	1	3	4

First round					Second round
1	(Kenya) Kakamega Homeboyz	0	1	1
4	(Libya) Al Hilal Benghazi	0	4	4
4	(Libya) Al Hilal Benghazi	0	4	4	(Libya) Al Hilal Benghazi (p)	1	1	2 (4)
					(Rwanda) Rayon Sports	1	1	2 (2)

First round					Second round
1	(South Africa) Sekhukhune United	—	—	w/o
4	(Eswatini) Young Buffaloes	—	—
4	(Eswatini) Young Buffaloes	—	—		(South Africa) Sekhukhune United	3	1	4
					(Democratic Republic of the Congo) Saint-Éloi Lupopo	1	1	2

First round					Second round
1	(Equatorial Guinea) Cano Sport	1	0	1
4	(Zambia) Maestro United	1	3	4
4	(Zambia) Maestro United	1	3	4	(Zambia) Maestro United	1	0	1
					(Republic of the Congo) Diables Noirs	2	2	4

First round					Second round
1	(Mozambique) Ferroviário de Maputo	—	—	w/o
4	(Comoros) Belle Lumière	—	—
4	(Comoros) Belle Lumière	—	—		(Mozambique) Ferroviário de Maputo	1	0	1 (3)
					(Angola) Sagrada Esperança (p)	0	1	1 (5)

First round					Second round
1	(Botswana) Gaborone United	0	3	3
4	(Madagascar) Elgeco Plus	1	1	2
4	(Madagascar) Elgeco Plus	1	1	2	(Botswana) Gaborone United	1	0	1
					(South Africa) SuperSport United	1	3	4

First round
1	AS Douanes Mauritania	2	0	2
4	(Guinea) Académie SOAR (a)	2	0	2
3	(Togo) ASC Kara	0	1	1
2	(Ivory Coast) AFAD Djékanou	0	2	2

Second round
(Guinea) Académie SOAR	1	2	3
(Ivory Coast) AFAD Djékanou	2	0	2

First round
1	(Guinea) Milo FC	1	1	2
4	(Ghana) Dreams FC	1	2	3
3	AS Douanes Niger	—	—
2	(Sierra Leone) Kallon	—	—	w/o

Second round
(Ghana) Dreams FC	2	1	3
(Sierra Leone) Kallon	1	1	2

First round
1	(Liberia) Watanga	1	1	2
4	(Mali) Stade Malien	3	4	7
3	(Sudan) Hay Al Arab	—	—
2	(Burundi) Aigle Noir	—	—	w/o

Second round
(Mali) Stade Malien (a)	2	1	3
(Burundi) Aigle Noir	0	3	3

First round
1	(Sudan) Haidoub	0	0	0
4	(South Sudan) Al Merreikh Juba	1	0	1
3	(Angola) Académica do Lobito	2	2	4
2	(Seychelles) La Passe	1	2	3

Second round
(South Sudan) Al Merreikh Juba	0	0	0
(Angola) Académica do Lobito	0	3	3

== First round ==
The first round, also called the first preliminary round, included the 40 teams that did not receive byes to the second round.

Team 1	Agg.	Team 2	1st leg	2nd leg
Bendel Insurance (Nigeria)	1–1 (4–3 p)	(Algeria) ASO Chlef	1–0	0–1
FUS Rabat (Morocco)	5–0	(Benin) Loto-Popo FC	3–0	2–0
Casa Sports (Senegal)	1–1 (a)	(Burkina Faso) EF Ouagadougou	1–1	0–0
Arta Solar (Djibouti)	6–0	(Somalia) Horseed	3–0	3–0
Singida Fountain Gate (Tanzania)	4–3	(Zanzibar) JKU	4–1	0–2
Bahir Dar Kenema (Ethiopia)	3–3 (4–3 p)	(Tanzania) Azam	2–1	1–2
Olympique Béja (Tunisia)	0–1	(Libya) Abu Salim	0–1	0–0
Kakamega Homeboyz (Kenya)	1–4	(Libya) Al Hilal Benghazi	0–0	1–4
Sekhukhune United (South Africa)	w/o (Note: Sekhukhune United won on a walkover after Young Buffaloes withdrew due to financial problems.)	(Eswatini) Young Buffaloes	—	—
Cano Sport (Equatorial Guinea)	1–4	(Zambia) Maestro United	1–1	0–3
Ferroviário de Maputo (Mozambique)	w/o (Note: Ferroviário de Maputo won on a walkover after Belle Lumière withdrew due to financial problems.)	(Comoros) Belle Lumière	—	—
Gaborone United (Botswana)	3–2	(Madagascar) Elgeco Plus	0–1	3–1
AS Douanes Mauritania	2–2 (a)	(Guinea) Académie SOAR	2–2	0–0
ASC Kara (Togo)	1–2	(Ivory Coast) AFAD Djékanou	0–0	1–2
Milo FC (Guinea)	2–3	(Ghana) Dreams FC	1–1	1–2
AS Douanes Niger	w/o (Note: Kallon won on a walkover after Niger clubs withdrew from 2023–24 CAF interclub competitions due to the 2023 Nigerien coup d'état.)	(Sierra Leone) Kallon	—	—
Watanga (Liberia)	2–7	(Mali) Stade Malien	1–3	1–4
Hay Al Arab (Sudan)	w/o (Note: Aigle Noir won on a walkover after Hay Al Arab withdrew from the competition due to the 2023 Sudan conflict.)	(Burundi) Aigle Noir	—	—
Haidoub (Sudan)	0–1	(South Sudan) Al Merreikh Juba	0–1	0–0
Académica do Lobito (Angola)	4–3	(Seychelles) La Passe	2–1	2–2

Notes:

19 August 2023
16:00 UTC+1

Bendel Insurance (Nigeria)	1–0	(Algeria) ASO Chlef
Osarenkhoe 42'	Report

Samuel Ogbemudia Stadium, Benin City
Referee: Aklesso Gnama (Togo)
26 August 2023
20:30 UTC+1

ASO Chlef (Algeria)	1–0	(Nigeria) Bendel Insurance
Aguieb 43'	Report
Penalties
	3–4

Salem Mabrouki Stadium, Algiers
Referee: Abdulbasit Shuboub (Libya)

1–1 on aggregate. Bendel Insurance won 4–3 on penalties.

20 August 2023
21:00 UTC+1

FUS Rabat (Morocco)	3–0	(Benin) Loto-Popo FC
Ibrahim 8' (o.g.); Nanah 28'; El Maftoul 90+2'	Report

Moulay Hassan Stadium, Rabat
Referee: Yosri Bouali (Tunisia)
27 August 2023
14:00 UTC+1

Loto-Popo FC (Benin)	0–2	(Morocco) FUS Rabat
	Report	Elaz 25'; Bach 86'

Stade de l'Amitié, Cotonou
Referee: Benoit Bado (Burkina Faso)

FUS Rabat won 5–0 on aggregate.

20 August 2023
17:00 UTC+0

Casa Sports (Senegal)	1–1	(Burkina Faso) EF Ouagadougou
Gomis 5'	Report	Sana 71'

Stade Lat-Dior, Thiès
Referee: Naby Laye Toure (Guinea)
27 August 2023
16:00 UTC+0

EF Ouagadougou (Burkina Faso)	0–0	(Senegal) Casa Sports
	Report

Stade de la Paix, Bouaké (Ivory Coast)
Referee: Hugues Modeste Richard Kokora (Ivory Coast)

1–1 on aggregate. EF Ouagadougou won on away goals.

19 August 2023
16:00 UTC+3

Arta Solar (Djibouti)	3–0	(Somalia) Horseed
Al. Ahmed 4' (o.g.); Traoré 41', 64'	Report

Azam Complex Stadium, Dar es Salaam (Tanzania)
Referee: Anthony Kiri Emmanuel Daudfourth (South Sudan)
24 August 2023
16:00 UTC+3

Horseed (Somalia)	0–3	(Djibouti) Arta Solar
	Report	Dadzie 1', 20'; Hussein 22' (o.g.)

Azam Complex Stadium, Dar es Salaam (Tanzania)
Referee: Elly Sasii (Tanzania)

Arta Solar won 6–0 on aggregate.

18 August 2023
17:30 UTC+3

Singida Fountain Gate (Tanzania)	4–1	(Zanzibar) JKU
Tchakei 5' (pen.), 40' (pen.); Chukwu 44'; Abuya 47'	Report	Abdull 63' (pen.)

Benjamin Mkapa Stadium, Dar es Salaam
Referee: Rodrigue Bigirimana (Burundi)
27 August 2023
19:30 UTC+3

JKU (Zanzibar)	2–0	(Tanzania) Singida Fountain Gate
N. Juma 6'; Matiko 42'	Report

Azam Complex Stadium, Dar es Salaam (Tanzania)
Referee: Mitiku Tewodros (Ethiopia)

Singida United won 4–3 on aggregate.

20 August 2023
15:30 UTC+3

Bahir Dar Kenema (Ethiopia)	2–1	(Tanzania) Azam
Gebre 20', 61'	Report	Mbombo 72'

Abebe Bikila Stadium, Addis Ababa
Referee: Ahmed Hassan Hussein (Somalia)
25 August 2023
19:00 UTC+3

Azam (Tanzania)	2–1	(Ethiopia) Bahir Dar Kenema
Selemani Ally 1'; Dube 10'	Report	Tadesse 17'
Penalties
	3–4

Azam Complex Stadium, Dar es Salaam
Referee: Hillary Hambaba (Zambia)

3–3 on aggregate. Bahir Dar Kenema won 4–3 on penalties.

20 August 2023
16:00 UTC+1

Olympique Béja (Tunisia)	0–1	(Libya) Abu Salim
	Report	Aleiyan 48' (pen.)

Stade Hammadi Agrebi, Tunis
Referee: Mustapha Kechaf (Morocco)
27 August 2023
17:00 UTC+3

Abu Salim (Libya)	0–0	(Tunisia) Olympique Béja
	Report

Al Salam Stadium, Cairo (Egypt)
Referee: Mahmoud Nagy (Egypt)

Abu Salim won 1–0 on aggregate.

19 August 2023
15:00 UTC+3

Kakamega Homeboyz (Kenya)	0–0	(Libya) Al Hilal Benghazi
	Report

Nyayo National Stadium, Nairobi
Referee: William Oloya (Uganda)
27 August 2023
20:00 UTC+2

Al Hilal Benghazi (Libya)	4–1	(Kenya) Kakamega Homeboyz
E. Kelvin 14', 32'; Al Shareef 27'; A. Kelvin 84'	Report	Nangila 45'

Benina Martyrs Stadium, Benghazi
Referee: Houssam Benyahia (Algeria)

Al Hilal Benghazi won 4–1 on aggregate.

19 August 2023
16:00 UTC+1

Cano Sport (Equatorial Guinea)	1–1	(Zambia) Maestro United
Chokki 31'	Report	Mpasela 63'

Estadio de Malabo, Malabo
Referee: Ledoux Dimonya Florent (Cameroon)
27 August 2023
17:00 UTC+2

Maestro United (Zambia)	3–0	(Equatorial Guinea) Cano Sport
Mhango 17'; Phiri 51' (pen.); Angwenga 62'	Report

National Heroes Stadium, Lusaka
Referee: Godfrey Nkhakananga (Malawi)

Maestro United won 4–1 on aggregate.

19 August 2023
16:00 UTC+2

Gaborone United (Botswana)	0–1	(Madagascar) Elgeco Plus
	Report	Razafimaro 25'

Botswana National Stadium, Gaborone
Referee: Paulo Moreira Sergio (Angola)
27 August 2023
21:30 UTC+3

Elgeco Plus (Madagascar)	1–3	(Botswana) Gaborone United
Razafimaro 72'	Report	Kgamanyane 2', 78'; Kgaswane 57'

Mahamasina Municipal Stadium, Antananarivo
Referee: Attoumani Elfachad (Comoros)

Gaborone United won 3–2 on aggregate.

19 August 2023
17:00 UTC+0

AS Douanes Mauritania	2–2	(Guinea) Académie SOAR
Y. El Id 53'; Lekweiry 56'	Report	I. Sylla 36'; Abdoul. Camara 38'

Stade Cheikha Ould Boïdiya, Nouakchott
Referee: Mohamed Ali Moussa (Niger)
26 August 2023
16:00 UTC+0

Académie SOAR (Guinea)	0–0	AS Douanes Mauritania
	Report

General Lansana Conté Stadium, Conakry
Referee: El Hadji Amadou Sy (Senegal)

2–2 on aggregate. Académie SOAR won on away goals.

19 August 2023
16:00 UTC+0

ASC Kara (Togo)	0–0	(Ivory Coast) AFAD Djékanou
	Report

Stade de Kégué, Lomé
Referee: Julian Nii Akwa Nunoo (Ghana)
26 August 2023
16:00 UTC+0

AFAD Djékanou (Ivory Coast)	2–1	(Togo) ASC Kara
Amani 45', 47'	Report	Coulibaly 44'

Charles Konan Banny Stadium, Yamoussoukro
Referee: Grema Mohammed (Nigeria)

AFAD Djékanou won 2–1 on aggregate.

19 August 2023
16:00 UTC+0

Milo FC (Guinea)	1–1	(Ghana) Dreams FC
Bamba 83'	Report	Avocevou 21'

General Lansana Conté Stadium, Conakry
Referee: Moussa Diou (Mauritania)
27 August 2023
15:00 UTC+0

Dreams FC (Ghana)	2–1	(Guinea) Milo FC
A. Boateng 83' (pen.); Antwi 86'	Report	S. Bangoura 13'

Accra Sports Stadium, Accra
Referee: Daniel Luc Kassa (Benin)

Dreams FC won 3–2 on aggregate.

20 August 2023
16:00 UTC+0

Watanga (Liberia)	1–3	(Mali) Stade Malien
Logan 28' (pen.)	Report	Kouma 15'; Djiguiba 73'; Dembélé 89'

SKD Stadium, Monrovia
Referee: Mustapha Bojang (Gambia)
26 August 2023
16:30 UTC+0

Stade Malien (Mali)	4–1	(Liberia) Watanga
D. Coulibaly 34', 39'; I. Traoré 45'; M. Traoré 68'	Report	Sando 85'

Stade du 26 Mars, Bamako
Referee: Pousri Armi Alfred (Chad)

Stade Malien won 7–2 on aggregate.

19 August 2023
15:30 UTC+3

Haidoub (Sudan)	0–1	(South Sudan) Al Merreikh Juba
	Report	Michael 26'

Abebe Bikila Stadium, Addis Ababa (Ethiopia)
Referee: Mohamed Koroma (Sierra Leone)
26 August 2023
15:00 UTC+2

Al Merreikh Juba (South Sudan)	0–0	(Sudan) Haidoub
	Report

Abebe Bikila Stadium, Addis Ababa (Ethiopia)
Referee: Mohamed Athoumani (Comoros)

Al Merreikh Juba won 1–0 on aggregate.

20 August 2023
19:00 UTC+1

Académica do Lobito (Angola)	2–1	(Seychelles) La Passe
Lucamba 6'; Tchyonga 13' (pen.)	Report	Ratianaridimby 9'

Estádio Nacional da Tundavala, Lubango
Referee: Thulani Sibandze (Eswatini)
26 August 2023
15:30 UTC+4

La Passe (Seychelles)	2–2	(Angola) Académica do Lobito
Ratianaridimby 72'; M. Rose 90'	Report	Bicho 34'; Jepson 80'

National Sports Complex Pitch 1, Saint Pierre (Mauritius)
Referee: Masixole Bambiso (South Africa)

Académica do Lobito won 4–3 on aggregate.

== Second round ==
The second round, also called the second preliminary round, included 32 teams: the 12 teams that received byes to this round, and the 20 winners of the first round.

Team 1	Agg.	Team 2	1st leg	2nd leg
Bendel Insurance (Nigeria)	2–3	(Morocco) RS Berkane	2–2	0–1
FUS Rabat (Morocco)	1–1 (a)	(Algeria) USM Alger	1–1	0–0
EF Ouagadougou (Burkina Faso)	0–2	(Nigeria) Rivers United	0–0	0–2
Arta Solar (Djibouti)	3–4	(Egypt) Zamalek	2–0	1–4
Singida Fountain Gate (Tanzania)	2–4	(Egypt) Modern Future	1–0	1–4
Bahir Dar Kenema (Ethiopia)	2–3	(Tunisia) Club Africain	2–0	0–3
Abu Salim (Libya)	5–4	(Uganda) Kampala City	3–1	2–3
Al Hilal Benghazi (Libya)	2–2 (4–2 p)	(Rwanda) Rayon Sports	1–1	1–1
Sekhukhune United (South Africa)	4–2	(Democratic Republic of the Congo) Saint-Éloi Lupopo	3–1	1–1
Maestro United (Zambia)	1–4	(Republic of the Congo) Diables Noirs	1–2	0–2
Ferroviário de Maputo (Mozambique)	1–1 (3–5 p)	(Angola) Sagrada Esperança	1–0	0–1
Gaborone United (Botswana)	1–4	(South Africa) SuperSport United	1–1	0–3
Académie SOAR (Guinea)	3–2	(Ivory Coast) AFAD Djékanou	1–2	2–0
Dreams FC (Ghana)	3–2	(Sierra Leone) Kallon	2–1	1–1
Stade Malien (Mali)	3–3 (a)	(Burundi) Aigle Noir	2–0	1–3
Al Merreikh Juba (South Sudan)	0–3	(Angola) Académica do Lobito	0–0	0–3

16 September 2023
16:00 UTC+1

Bendel Insurance (Nigeria)	2–2	(Morocco) RS Berkane
Osarenkhoe 28'; Augustus 60'	Report	Lamlaoui 37'; El Mourabit 77'

Samuel Ogbemudia Stadium, Benin City
Referee: Lamin Jammeh (Gambia)
29 September 2023
21:00 UTC+1

RS Berkane (Morocco)	1–0	(Nigeria) Bendel Insurance
Lamlaoui 43'	Report

Stade Municipal de Berkane, Berkane
Referee: Alhadi Allaou Mahamat (Chad)

RS Berkane won 3–2 on aggregate.

23 September 2023 (Note: The FUS Rabat v USM Alger match, originally scheduled to be played between 15 or 17 September 2023, was rescheduled to 23 September 2023 due to USM Alger participation in the 2023 CAF Super Cup on 15 September 2023.)
20:30 UTC+1

FUS Rabat (Morocco)	1–1	(Algeria) USM Alger
Ajako 83'	Report	Belaïd 45'

Moulay Hassan Stadium, Rabat
Referee: Elmabrouk Muhammad (Libya)
1 October 2023
20:00 UTC+1

USM Alger (Algeria)	0–0	(Morocco) FUS Rabat
	Report

Miloud Hadefi Stadium, Oran
Referee: Sadok Selmi (Tunisia)

1–1 on aggregate. USM Alger won on away goals.

17 September 2023
19:00 UTC+0

EF Ouagadougou (Burkina Faso)	0–0	(Nigeria) Rivers United
	Report

Charles Konan Banny Stadium, Yamoussoukro (Ivory Coast)
Referee: Naby Laye Toure (Guinea)
1 October 2023
16:00 UTC+1

Rivers United (Nigeria)	2–0	(Burkina Faso) EF Ouagadougou
Oyowah 89', 90+9'	Report

Adokiye Amiesimaka Stadium, Port Harcourt
Referee: Youcef Gamouh (Algeria)

Rivers United won 2–0 on aggregate.

16 September 2023
16:00 UTC+3

Arta Solar (Djibouti)	2–0	(Egypt) Zamalek
Dadzie 47'; Elabeh 59'	Report

Azam Complex Stadium, Dar es Salaam (Tanzania)
Referee: Mohamed Athoumani (Comoros)
30 September 2023
19:00 UTC+3

Zamalek (Egypt)	4–1	(Djibouti) Arta Solar
Obama 49'; Shikabala 52'; Zizo 74'; Mathlouthi 90'	Report	Hassan 16'

Cairo International Stadium, Cairo
Referee: Daniel Nii Laryea (Ghana)

Zamalek won 4–3 on aggregate.

17 September 2023
16:00 UTC+3

Singida Fountain Gate (Tanzania)	1–0	(Egypt) Modern Future
Rupia 53'	Report

Azam Complex Stadium, Dar es Salaam
Referee: Jelly Chavani (South Africa)
1 October 2023
18:00 UTC+3

Modern Future (Egypt)	4–1	(Tanzania) Singida Fountain Gate
Atef 5'; Refaat 53' (pen.); Kamal 68'; Maher 90+7'	Report	Tchakei 28'

Al Salam Stadium, Cairo
Referee: Dahane Beida (Mauritania)

Modern Future won 4–2 on aggregate.

17 September 2023
15:30 UTC+3

Bahir Dar Kenema (Ethiopia)	2–0	(Tunisia) Club Africain
Tadesse 45', 89'	Report

Abebe Bikila Stadium, Addis Ababa
Referee: Tuoniféré Soro (Ivory Coast)
1 October 2023
16:00 UTC+1

Club Africain (Tunisia)	3–0	(Ethiopia) Bahir Dar Kenema
Srarfi 14'; Eduwo 31'; H. Labidi 44'	Report

Stade Hammadi Agrebi, Tunis
Referee: Ousmane Diakate (Mali)

Club Africain won 3–2 on aggregate.

17 September 2023
16:00 UTC+1

Abu Salim (Libya)	3–1	(Uganda) Kampala City
Abushnaf 26'; Aleiyan 35' (pen.); Alabani 55'	Report	A. Mayanja 72'

Stade Hammadi Agrebi, Tunis (Tunisia)
Referee: Hamidou Diero (Burkina Faso)
30 September 2023
16:00 UTC+3

Kampala City (Uganda)	3–2	(Libya) Abu Salim
Shaban 20'; Usama 84', 90'	Report	Aleiyan 72' (pen.); Nworah 86'

St. Mary's Stadium-Kitende, Entebbe
Referee: Fitial Charel Just Kokolo (Congo)

Abu Salim won 5–4 on aggregate.

24 September 2023 (Note: The Al Hilal Benghazi v Rayon Sports match, originally scheduled to be played on 15 September 2023 at Benina Martyrs Stadium, Benghazi, was rescheduled to 24 September 2023 at Kigali Pelé Stadium, Kigali (Rwanda) due to the Storm Daniel.)
20:00 UTC+2

Al Hilal Benghazi (Libya)	1–1	(Rwanda) Rayon Sports
Maryami 84'	Report	Luvumbu 54' (pen.)

Kigali Pelé Stadium, Kigali (Rwanda)
Referee: Younoussa Tawel Camara (Guinea)
30 September 2023
18:00 UTC+2

Rayon Sports (Rwanda)	1–1	(Libya) Al Hilal Benghazi
Ojera 38'	Report	Maryami 1'
Penalties
	2–4

Kigali Pelé Stadium, Kigali
Referee: Adalbert Diouf (Senegal)

2–2 on aggregate. Al Hilal Benghazi won 4–2 on penalties.

16 September 2023
17:00 UTC+2

Sekhukhune United (South Africa)	3–1	(Democratic Republic of the Congo) Saint-Éloi Lupopo
Ohizu 12'; Webber 39'; Yamba 55'	Report	Katumbwe 15'

Peter Mokaba Stadium, Polokwane
Referee: Ahmed Ally Arijiga (Tanzania)
1 October 2023
15:30 UTC+1

Saint-Éloi Lupopo (Democratic Republic of the Congo)	1–1	(South Africa) Sekhukhune United
Bola 20'	Report	Thutlwa 59'

Stade des Martyrs, Kinshasa
Referee: Chelanget Sabila (Uganda)

Sekhukhune United won 4–2 on aggregate.

17 September 2023
15:00 UTC+2

Maestro United (Zambia)	1–2	(Republic of the Congo) Diables Noirs
Phiri 88' (pen.)	Report	Fataki 14'; Niamathé 79'

National Heroes Stadium, Lusaka
Referee: Sabri Mohamed Fadul (Sudan)
1 October 2023
15:30 UTC+1

Diables Noirs (Republic of the Congo)	2–0	(Zambia) Maestro United
Opimbat 67'; Onguele 85'	Report

Stade Alphonse Massemba-Débat, Brazzaville
Referee: Daouda Gueye (Senegal)

Diables Noirs won 4–1 on aggregate.

16 September 2023
15:00 UTC+2

Ferroviário de Maputo (Mozambique)	1–0	(Angola) Sagrada Esperança
Mário 88'	Report

Estádio do Zimpeto, Maputo
Referee: Keren Yocette (Seychelles)
30 September 2023
19:00 UTC+1

Sagrada Esperança (Angola)	1–0	(Mozambique) Ferroviário de Maputo
Walter 90'	Report
Penalties
	5–3

Estádio Nacional da Tundavala, Lubango
Referee: Retselisitsoe David Molise (Lesotho)

1–1 on aggregate. Sagrada Esperança won 5–3 on penalties.

16 September 2023
19:00 UTC+2

Gaborone United (Botswana)	1–1	(South Africa) SuperSport United
Sesay 90+5'	Report	Bezuidenhout 48'

Botswana National Stadium, Gaborone
Referee: Kabanga Yannick Malala (DR Congo)
29 September 2023
19:00 UTC+2

SuperSport United (South Africa)	3–0	(Botswana) Gaborone United
Ighodaro 56', 72'; Grobler 90'	Report

Peter Mokaba Stadium, Polokwane
Referee: Abdoul Karim Twagiramukiza (Rwanda)

SuperSport United won 4–1 on aggregate.

15 September 2023
16:00 UTC+0

Académie SOAR (Guinea)	1–2	(Ivory Coast) AFAD Djékanou
M. Camara 69'	Report	Amani 47'; Bonheur 57'

General Lansana Conté Stadium, Conakry
Referee: Jose Asangono (Equatorial Guinea)
30 September 2023
16:00 UTC+0

AFAD Djékanou (Ivory Coast)	0–2	(Guinea) Académie SOAR
	Report	Sango 43' (o.g.); D. Sylla 45'

Charles Konan Banny Stadium, Yamoussoukro
Referee: Yosri Bouali (Tunisia)

Académie SOAR won 3–2 on aggregate.

15 September 2023
16:00 UTC+0

Dreams FC (Ghana)	2–1	(Sierra Leone) Kallon
Atuahene 11'; Antwi 56'	Report	Karim 45'

Accra Sports Stadium, Accra
Referee: Fabricio Duarte (Cape Verde)
30 September 2023
16:00 UTC+0

Kallon (Sierra Leone)	1–1	(Ghana) Dreams FC
M. Fofanah 90'	Report	A. Boateng 5'

SKD Stadium, Monrovia (Liberia)
Referee: Aklesso Gnama (Togo)

Dreams FC won 3–2 on aggregate.

17 September 2023
16:30 UTC+0

Stade Malien (Mali)	2–0	(Burundi) Aigle Noir
I. Traoré 51' (pen.); D. Coulibaly 66' (pen.)	Report

Stade du 26 Mars, Bamako
Referee: Emmanuel Mensah (Liberia)
29 September 2023
16:00 UTC+3

Aigle Noir (Burundi)	3–1	(Mali) Stade Malien
Ineza 39', 54', 83'	Report	I. Traoré 33'

Azam Complex Stadium, Dar es Salaam (Tanzania)
Referee: Andre Kolissala Mbangui (Central African Republic)

3–3 on aggregate. Stade Malien won on away goals.

17 September 2023
14:00 UTC+3

Al Merreikh Juba (South Sudan)	0–0	(Angola) Académica do Lobito
	Report

Nyayo National Stadium, Nairobi (Kenya)
Referee: Tsegay Mogos Teklu (Eritrea)
1 October 2023
16:00 UTC+1

Académica do Lobito (Angola)	3–0	(South Sudan) Al Merreikh Juba
Caprego 31'; Maria Pia 59'; Jepson 82'	Report

Estádio Nacional da Tundavala, Lubango
Referee: Souleiman Ahmed Djama (Djibouti)

Académica do Lobito won 3–0 on aggregate.

== See also ==
- 2023–24 CAF Champions League qualifying rounds
