= 2023 Champions League =

2023 Champions League may refer to:

== Football ==
- 2022–23 UEFA Champions League
- 2023–24 UEFA Champions League
- 2023–24 AFC Champions League
- 2022–23 CAF Champions League
- 2023–24 CAF Champions League
