= Feleke =

Feleke is a surname. Notable people with the surname include:

- Bashay Feleke (1917–2008), Ethiopian long-distance runner
- Getu Feleke (born 1986), Ethiopian long-distance runner
- Sisaye Feleke (born 1947), Ethiopian sprinter

== See also ==
- Zeleke
