= 2023–24 CAF Champions League knockout stage =

- Dates: 29 March – 25 May 2024

Tournament statistics
- Matches played: 14
- Goals scored: 12 (0.86 per match)

The 2023–24 CAF Champions League knockout stage started on 29 March with the quarter-finals and ended on 25 May 2024 with the second leg of final to decide the champions of the 2023–24 CAF Champions League. A total of eight teams competed in the knockout stage.

Times are local.

== Round and draw dates ==
The schedule was as follows.

Round	Draw date	First leg	Second leg
Quarter-finals	12 March 2024	29–30 March 2024	5–6 April 2024
Semi-finals	12 March 2024	20 April 2024	26 April 2024
Final	12 March 2024	18 May 2024	25 May 2024

== Format ==
Each tie in the knockout phase was played over two legs, with each team playing one leg at home. The team that scored more goals on aggregate over the two legs advanced to the next round. If the aggregate score was level, the away goals rule was applied, i.e. the team that scored more goals away from home over the two legs advanced. If away goals were also equal, then extra time was not played and the winners were decided by a penalty shoot-out (Regulations III. 26 & 27). The mechanism of the draws for each round was as follows:

- In the draw for the quarter-finals, the four group winners were seeded, and the four group runners-up were unseeded. The seeded teams were drawn against the unseeded teams, with the seeded teams hosting the second leg. Teams from the same group could not be drawn against each other, while teams from the same association could be drawn against each other.
- In the draws for semi-finals, there were no seedings, and teams from the same group or the same association could be drawn against each other. As the draws for the quarter-finals and semi-finals were held together before the quarter-finals were played, the identity of the quarter-final winners was not known at the time of the semi-final draw.

== Qualified teams ==
The knockout stage involved the 8 teams which qualified as winners and runners-up of each of the four groups in the group stage.

Group	Winners	Runners-up
A	(South African Football Association) Mamelodi Sundowns	(Congolese Association Football Federation) TP Mazembe
B	(Ivorian Football Federation) ASEC Mimosas	(Tanzania Football Federation) Simba
C	(Angolan Football Federation) Petro de Luanda	(Tunisian Football Federation) Espérance de Tunis
D	(Egyptian Football Association) Al Ahly	(Tanzania Football Federation) Young Africans

== Bracket ==
The bracket of the knockout stage was determined as follows:

Round	Matchups
Quarter-finals	(Group winners hosted second leg, matchups decided by draw, teams from same group cannot play each other): QF1; QF2; QF3; QF4
Semi-finals	(Matchups and order of legs decided by draw, between winners QF1, QF2, QF3, QF4): SF1; SF2
Final	Winners SF1 and SF2 faced each other in two legs to decide the champions

The bracket was decided after the draw for the knockout stage which was held on 12 March 2024.

Quarter-finals
(Tunisian Football Federation) Espérance de Tunis (p)	0	0	0 (4)
(Ivorian Football Federation) ASEC Mimosas	0	0	0 (2)
(Tanzania Football Federation) Young Africans	0	0	0 (2)
(South African Football Association) Mamelodi Sundowns (p)	0	0	0 (3)
(Congolese Association Football Federation) TP Mazembe	0	2	2
(Angolan Football Federation) Petro de Luanda	0	1	1
(Tanzania Football Federation) Simba	0	0	0
(Egyptian Football Association) Al Ahly	1	2	3

Semi-finals
(Tunisian Football Federation) Espérance de Tunis	1	1	2
(South African Football Association) Mamelodi Sundowns	0	0	0
(Congolese Association Football Federation) TP Mazembe	0	0	0
(Egyptian Football Association) Al Ahly	0	3	3

Final
(Tunisian Football Federation) Espérance de Tunis	0	0	0
(Egyptian Football Association) Al Ahly	0	1	1

== Quarter-finals ==
The draw for the quarter-finals was held on 12 March 2024.

=== Summary ===
The first legs were played on 29 and 30 March, and the second legs were played on 5 and 6 April 2024.

Team 1	Agg.	Team 2	1st leg	2nd leg
Simba (Tanzania)	0–3	(Egypt) Al Ahly	0–1	0–2
TP Mazembe (Democratic Republic of the Congo)	2–1	(Angola) Petro de Luanda	0–0	2–1
Espérance de Tunis (Tunisia)	0–0 (4–2 p)	(Ivory Coast) ASEC Mimosas	0–0	0–0
Young Africans (Tanzania)	0–0 (2–3 p)	(South Africa) Mamelodi Sundowns	0–0	0–0

=== Matches ===
29 March 2024
21:00 UTC+3

Simba (Tanzania Football Federation)	0–1	(Egyptian Football Association) Al Ahly
	Report	Koka 4'

Benjamin Mkapa Stadium, Dar es Salaam
Referee: Abongile Tom (South Africa)
5 April 2024
22:00 UTC+2

Al Ahly (Egyptian Football Association)	2–0	(Tanzania Football Federation) Simba
El Solia 47'; Kahraba 90+9' (pen.)	Report

Cairo International Stadium, Cairo
Referee: Alhadi Allaou Mahamat (Chad)

Al Ahly won 3–0 on aggregate.

30 March 2024
15:00 UTC+2

TP Mazembe (Congolese Association Football Federation)	0–0	(Angolan Football Federation) Petro de Luanda
	Report

Stade TP Mazembe, Lubumbashi
Referee: Mutaz Ibrahim (Libya)
6 April 2024
17:00 UTC+1

Petro de Luanda (Angolan Football Federation)	1–2	(Congolese Association Football Federation) TP Mazembe
Toro 29'	Report	Kinzumbi 82'; Beya 90+6'

Estádio 11 de Novembro, Luanda
Referee: Issa Sy (Senegal)

TP Mazembe won 2–1 on aggregate.

30 March 2024
22:00 UTC+1

Espérance de Tunis (Tunisian Football Federation)	0–0	(Ivorian Football Federation) ASEC Mimosas
	Report

Stade Hammadi Agrebi, Tunis
Referee: Peter Waweru (Kenya)
6 April 2024
20:00 UTC+0

ASEC Mimosas (Ivorian Football Federation)	0–0	(Tunisian Football Federation) Espérance de Tunis
	Report
Penalties
Karidioula (penalty scored); Koffi (penalty missed); Diarrassouba (penalty missed); Pokou (penalty scored)	2–4	(penalty scored) Meriah; (penalty scored) Bouchniba; (penalty scored) Tka; (penalty scored) Tougai

Felix Houphouet Boigny Stadium, Abidjan
Referee: Jean-Jacques Ndala Ngambo (DR Congo)

0–0 on aggregate. Espérance de Tunis won 4–2 on penalties.

30 March 2024
21:00 UTC+3

Young Africans (Tanzania Football Federation)	0–0	(South African Football Association) Mamelodi Sundowns
	Report

Benjamin Mkapa Stadium, Dar es Salaam
Referee: Amin Omar (Egypt)
5 April 2024
20:00 UTC+2

Mamelodi Sundowns (South African Football Association)	0–0	(Tanzania Football Federation) Young Africans
	Report
Penalties
Allende (penalty scored); Sirino (penalty missed); Costa (penalty scored); Maema (penalty scored)	3–2	(penalty missed) Aziz Ki; (penalty scored) Okrah; (penalty missed) Job; (penalty scored) Gnadou; (penalty missed) Hamad

Loftus Versfeld Stadium, Pretoria
Referee: Dahane Beida (Mauritania)

0–0 on aggregate. Mamelodi Sundowns won 3–2 on penalties.

== Semi-finals ==
The draw for the semi-finals was held on 12 March 2024 (after the quarter-finals draw).

=== Summary ===
The first legs were played on 20 April, and the second legs were played on 26 April 2024.

Team 1	Agg.	Team 2	1st leg	2nd leg
Espérance de Tunis (Tunisia)	2–0	(South Africa) Mamelodi Sundowns	1–0	1–0
TP Mazembe (Democratic Republic of the Congo)	0–3	(Egypt) Al Ahly	0–0	0–3

=== Matches ===
20 April 2024
20:00 UTC+1

Espérance de Tunis (Tunisian Football Federation)	1–0	(South African Football Association) Mamelodi Sundowns
Sasse 41'	Report

Stade Hammadi Agrebi, Tunis
Referee: Omar Artan (Somalia)
26 April 2024
20:00 UTC+2

Mamelodi Sundowns (South African Football Association)	0–1	(Tunisian Football Federation) Espérance de Tunis
	Report	Bouchniba 57'

Loftus Versfeld Stadium, Pretoria
Referee: Issa Sy (Senegal)

Espérance de Tunis won 2–0 on aggregate.

20 April 2024
15:00 UTC+2

TP Mazembe (Congolese Association Football Federation)	0–0	(Egyptian Football Association) Al Ahly
	Report

Stade TP Mazembe, Lubumbashi
Referee: Pacifique Ndabihawenimana (Burundi)
26 April 2024
22:00 UTC+3

Al Ahly (Egyptian Football Association)	3–0	(Congolese Association Football Federation) TP Mazembe
Abdelmonem 68'; Abou Ali 83'; Tawfik 90+12'	Report

Cairo International Stadium, Cairo
Referee: Peter Waweru (Kenya)

Al Ahly won 3–0 on aggregate.

== Final ==
The first leg was played on 18 May, and the second leg was played on 25 May 2024.

Team 1	Agg.	Team 2	1st leg	2nd leg
Espérance de Tunis (Tunisia)	0–1	(Egypt) Al Ahly	0–0	0–1

18 May 2024
20:00 UTC+1

Espérance de Tunis (Tunisia)	0–0	(Egypt) Al Ahly
	Report

Stade Hammadi Agrebi, Tunis
Attendance: 35,000
Referee: Mustapha Ghorbal (Algeria)
25 May 2024
20:00 UTC+3

Al Ahly (Egypt)	1–0	(Tunisia) Espérance de Tunis
Aholou 4' (o.g.)	Report

Cairo International Stadium, Cairo
Attendance: 52,000
Referee: Jean-Jacques Ndala Ngambo (DR Congo)

Al Ahly won 1–0 on aggregate.

== See also ==
- 2023–24 CAF Confederation Cup knockout stage
