= Zeleke =

Zeleke is a surname. Notable people with the surname include:

- Belay Zeleke (1912–1945), Ethiopian leader of the patriots in Gojjam and Wällo, who participated in the resistance against the Italians during the occupation
- Natnael Zeleke, Ethiopian footballer
- Yared Zeleke, Ethiopian film director
