= 2022–23 Malian Première Division =

Malian Première Division
- Season: 2022–23
- Dates: 15 October 2022 – 10 July 2023
- Champions: AS Real Bamako (7th title)
- Relegated: Yeelen Olympique; Lafia Club de Bamako
- CAF Champions League: AS Real Bamako
- CAF Confederation Cup: Stade Malien
- All statistics correct as of 10 July 2023.

The 2022–23 Malian Première Division was the 56th season of the highest level of professional football in Mali. The championship was contested by 16 teams, starting in October 2022 and finishing in July 2023. Djoliba AC were the holders going into the season following their 23rd title in the 2021–22 season, but lost the title to AS Real Bamako, who won their 7th title.

== Overview ==
Following the reduction of the Première Division from 20 clubs to 18 clubs in the 2021–22 season, there was a further reduction of two teams ahead of the 2022–23 season meaning that 16 clubs contested the championship. Binga FC and US Bougouni were promoted from the second tier, replacing the four relegated teams from the season before - CS Duguwolofila, US Bougouba, AS Olympique de Messira and AS Douanes de Sikasso. Teams played in a home-and-away round robin format.

The title race was largely contested by Djoliba AC and AS Real Bamako, who were tied at the top at the halfway point. The two pulled away further in the second half of the season, with AS Real finishing three points ahead of Djoliba after 30 games to claim the title. At the other end of the table, USC Kita survived a poor start that put them in the bottom two after the first 15 games, finishing 12th. Lafia Club de Bamako instead dropped into the relegation zone, joining Yeelen Olympique who only managed 12 points and ended 18 points away from safety. They will be replaced by US Bougouba and ATS Koro who won their respective Tournoi de Montée pools.

Joint-record champions Stade Malien had a poor league campaign, finishing in 9th place and 21 points behind AS Real Bamako. However, they managed to go all the way in the Malian Cup, beating Simbo AC, CASS, USFAS Bamako and Binga FC on the way to the final. There they beat Onze Créateurs de Niaréla 1–0, thus qualifying for the 2023–24 CAF Confederation Cup.

== League table ==
Pos	Team	Pld	W	D	L	GF	GA	GD	Pts	Qualification or relegation
1	AS Real Bamako (C, Q)	30	18	8	4	45	17	+28	62	Qualification for 2023–24 CAF Champions League
2	Djoliba AC	30	16	11	3	39	12	+27	59	
3	USFAS Bamako	30	12	13	5	32	22	+10	49	
4	AS Bakaridjan	30	13	8	9	29	23	+6	47	
5	Onze Créateurs de Niaréla	30	12	9	9	34	28	+6	45	
6	Afrique Football Élite	30	12	8	10	30	21	+9	44	
7	Binga FC	30	10	13	7	24	19	+5	43	
8	US Bougouni	30	11	10	9	39	35	+4	43	
9	Stade Malien	30	9	14	7	21	16	+5	41	Qualification for the 2023–24 CAF Confederation Cup (Note: Stade Malien qualified for the CAF Confederation Cup as the 2022-23 Malian Cup winner)
10	AS Korofina	30	8	14	8	25	26	−1	38	
11	AS Police de Bamako	30	9	10	11	23	29	−6	37	
12	USC Kita	30	7	12	11	23	28	−5	33	
13	AS Black Stars de Badalabougou	30	6	13	11	30	38	−8	31	
14	Cercle Olympique de Bamako	30	7	9	14	22	43	−21	30	
15	Lafia Club de Bamako (R)	30	3	13	14	17	36	−19	22	Relegation
16	Yeelen Olympique (R)	30	3	3	24	21	61	−40	12	Relegation

Updated to match(es) played on 10 July 2023. Source: Soccerway
Rules for classification: 1) Points; 2) Goal Difference
(C) Champions; (Q) Qualified for the phase indicated; (R) Relegated
