= Ayman Mohamed Hussein =

Somali footballer (born 2000)

Personal information
- Date of birth: 12 December 2000 (age 25)
- Position: Defender

Senior career*
Years	Team	Apps	(Gls)
2019–	Midnimo		

International career^{‡}
2019–	Somalia	3	(0)
- * Club domestic league appearances and goals as of 20:00, 14 September 2019 (UTC) ‡ National team caps and goals as of 20:00, 14 September 2019 (UTC)

Ayman Mohamed Hussein (Somali: Ayman Maxamed Xussen; born 12 December 2000) is a Somali footballer who plays as a defender for Midnimo.

== Club career ==
As of 2019, Hussein plays for Somali First Division club Midnimo.

== International career ==
On 27 July 2019, Hussein made his debut for Somalia in a 3–1 loss against Uganda during the 2020 African Nations Championship qualification.
