= Sankara Karamoko =

Ivorian footballer (born 2003)

Personal information
- Full name: Sankara William Karamoko
- Date of birth: 9 November 2003 (age 23)
- Place of birth: Abidjan, Ivory Coast
- Height: 1.75 m (5 ft 9 in)
- Position: Forward

Team information
- Current team: Wolfsberger AC
- Number: 49

Youth career
- ASEC Mimosas

Senior career*
Years	Team	Apps	(Gls)
2021–2024	ASEC Mimosas		
2024–	Wolfsberger AC	15	(0)
2024–2025	→ Wolfsberger AC II	23	(11)
2025–2026	→ IMT (loan)	31	(8)

International career^{‡}
2022–2023	Ivory Coast	5	(1)
- * Club domestic league appearances and goals as of 24 May 2026 ‡ National team caps and goals as of 27 January 2023

Sankara William Karamoko (born 9 November 2003) is an Ivorian professional footballer who plays as a forward for Austrian club Wolfsberger AC.

== Club career ==
Karamoko began his senior career with the Ivory Coast Ligue 1 club ASEC Mimosas in 2021, and helped them win two leagues and cups. He was the 2023–24 CAF Champions League top scorer. On 31 January 2024, he transferred to the Austrian Football Bundesliga club Wolfsberger AC on a contract until 2027. Karamoko joined the Serbian club IMT on loan on 25 July 2025.

== International career ==
Karamoko was called up to the Ivory Coast for the 2022 African Nations Championship.

== Honours ==
ASEC Mimosas

- Ivory Coast Ligue 1: 2021–22, 2022–23
- Coupe de Côte d'Ivoire: 2023
- Coupe Houphouët-Boigny: 2023

Wolfsberger AC

- Austrian Cup: 2024–25

Individual

- 2023–24 CAF Champions League Top Scorer
