= Freeman Niamathé =

Central African Republic footballer

Personal information
- Full name: Steve Freeman Niamathé
- Date of birth: 12 March 1999 (age 27)
- Place of birth: Bangui, Central African Republic
- Height: 1.85 m (6 ft 1 in)
- Position: Centre-back

Team information
- Current team: Red Star Bangui

Senior career*
Years	Team	Apps	(Gls)
2019–	Red Star Bangui		

International career^{‡}
2019–	Central African Republic	3	(0)
- * Club domestic league appearances and goals as of 22:37, 1 September 2021 (UTC) ‡ National team caps and goals as of 22:37, 1 September 2021 (UTC)

Steve Freeman Niamathé (born 12 March 1999) is a Central African footballer who plays as a centre-back for Red Star Bangui and the Central African Republic national team.

== Club career ==
Ndobé debuted with the Central African Republic national team in a 4–1 2020 African Nations Championship qualification loss to DR Congo on 20 October 2019.
