= 2023–24 CAF Champions League =

2023–24 TotalEnergies CAF Champions League
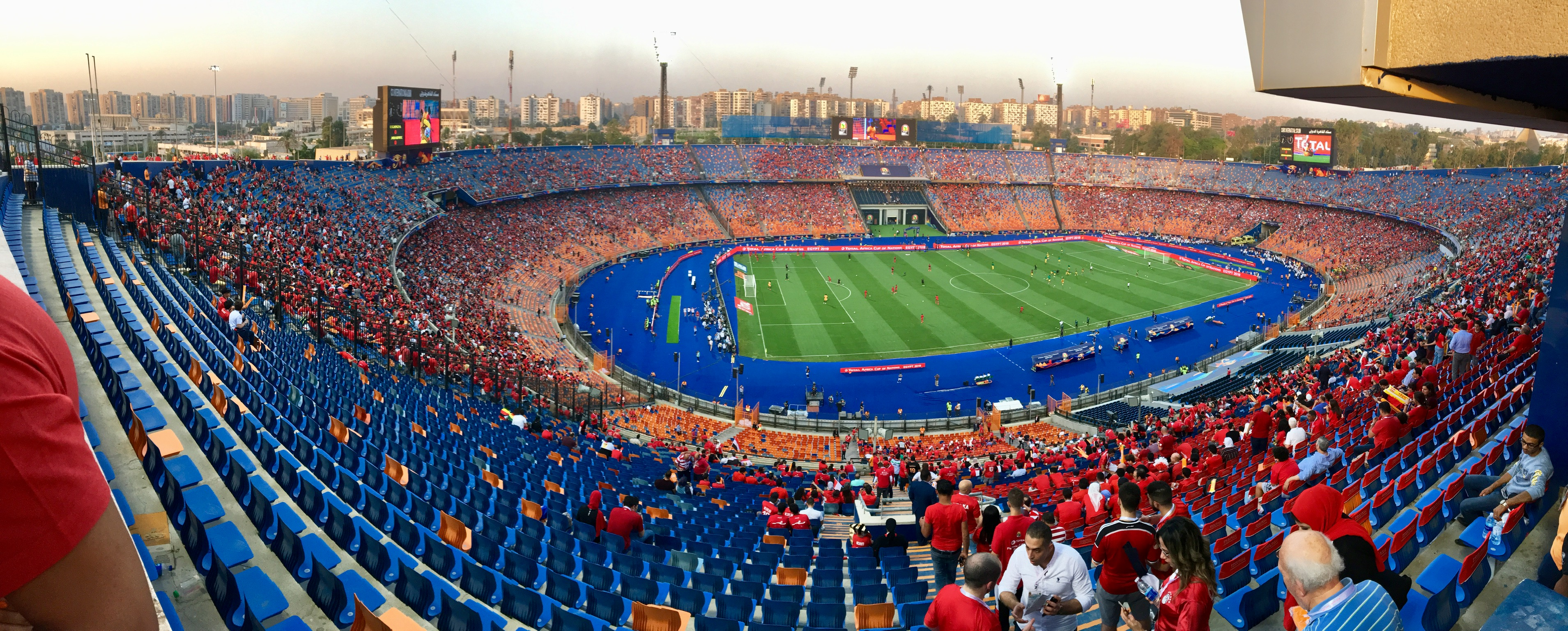
- Cairo International Stadium in Cairo hosted the podium where Al Ahly lifted the trophy

Tournament details
- Dates: Qualifying: 18 August – 2 October 2023; Competition proper: 24 November 2023 – 25 May 2024
- Teams: 54 (from 42 associations)

Final positions
- Champions: (Egypt) Al Ahly (12th title)
- Runners-up: (Tunisia) Espérance de Tunis

Tournament statistics
- Matches played: 62
- Goals scored: 94 (1.52 per match)
- Top scorer: (Ivory Coast) Sankara Karamoko (4 goals)
- (Note: All statistics do not include qualifying play-offs)

The 2023–24 CAF Champions League (officially the 2023–24 TotalEnergies CAF Champions League for sponsorship reasons) was the 60th edition of Africa's premier club football tournament organized by the Confederation of African Football (CAF), and the 28th edition under the current CAF Champions League title.

The winners, Al Ahly, for their second consecutive and a record-extending 12th title, automatically qualified for the 2024–25 CAF Champions League and earned the right to play against the winners of the 2023–24 CAF Confederation Cup in the 2024 CAF Super Cup. They also qualified for the brand new 2024 FIFA Intercontinental Cup and the expanded 2025 FIFA Club World Cup in the United States.

The qualifying rounds for the CAF Champions League may have been pushed back to August and September, and the group stage pushed forward to start in November. No official explanation was given, though the press claims that the reason was the introduction of CAF's newest competition, the African Football League, which began on 20 October 2023.

== Association team allocation ==
All 54 CAF member associations may enter the CAF Champions League, with the 12 highest ranked associations according to their CAF 5-year ranking eligible to enter two teams in the competition. As a result, theoretically a maximum of 68 teams could enter the tournament – although this level has never been reached.

For the 2023–24 CAF Champions League, the CAF used the 2019–2023 CAF 5-year ranking, which calculates points for each entrant association based on their clubs’ performance over those 5 years in the CAF Champions League and CAF Confederation Cup. The criteria for points were the following:

	CAF Champions League	CAF Confederation Cup
Winners	6 points	5 points
Runners-up	5 points	4 points
Losing semi-finalists	4 points	3 points
Losing quarter-finalists	3 points	2 points
3rd place in groups	2 points	1 point
4th place in groups	1 point	0.5 point

The points were multiplied by a coefficient according to the year as follows:

- 2022–23: × 5
- 2021–22: × 4
- 2020–21: × 3
- 2019–20: × 2
- 2018–19: × 1

== Teams ==
The following 54 teams from 42 associations entered the competition. Teams in:

- Bold received a bye to the second round.
- The other teams entered the first round.

Associations are shown according to their 2018–2023 CAF 5-year Ranking – those with a ranking score have their rank and score (in parentheses) indicated.

Associations eligible to enter two teams (Top 12 associations)
Association	Rank (Pts)	Team	Qualifying method
Morocco	1 (180)	AS FAR	2022–23 Botola champions
Morocco	1 (180)	Wydad AC	2022–23 Botola runners-up
Egypt	2 (172.5)	Al Ahly	Title holders (2022–23 CAF Champions League winners) and 2022–23 Egyptian Premier League winners
Egypt	2 (172.5)	Pyramids	2022–23 Egyptian Premier League runners-up
Algeria	3 (134)	CR Belouizdad	2022–23 Algerian Ligue Professionnelle 1 champions
Algeria	3 (134)	CS Constantine	2022–23 Algerian Ligue Professionnelle 1 runners-up
South Africa	4 (114)	Mamelodi Sundowns	2022–23 South African Premier Division champions
South Africa	4 (114)	Orlando Pirates	2022–23 South African Premier Division runners-up
Tunisia	5 (101)	Étoile du Sahel	2022–23 Tunisian Ligue Professionnelle 1 champions
Tunisia	5 (101)	Espérance de Tunis	2022–23 Tunisian Ligue Professionnelle 1 runners-up
Tanzania	6 (56.5)	Young Africans	2022-23 Tanzanian Premier League champions
Tanzania	6 (56.5)	Simba	2022-23 Tanzanian Premier League runners-up
DR Congo	7 (54)	TP Mazembe	2022–23 Linafoot (Cancelled) First on FECOFA rankings
DR Congo	7 (54)	AS Vita Club	2022–23 Linafoot (Cancelled) Second on FECOFA rankings
Angola	8 (41.5)	Petro de Luanda	2022–23 Girabola champions
Angola	8 (41.5)	Primeiro de Agosto	2022–23 Girabola runners-up
Sudan	9 (39)	Al Hilal	2022–23 Sudan Premier League champions
Sudan	9 (39)	Al Merrikh	2022–23 Sudan Premier League runners-up
Guinea	10 (29)	Hafia	2022–23 Guinée Championnat National champions
Guinea	10 (29)	Horoya	2022–23 Guinée Championnat National runners-up
Libya	11 (28)	Al Ahli Tripoli	2022–23 Libyan Premier League champions
Libya	11 (28)	Al Ahly Benghazi	2022–23 Libyan Premier League runners-up
Nigeria	12 (25)	Enyimba	2022–23 Nigeria Professional Football League champions
Nigeria	12 (25)	Remo Stars	2022–23 Nigeria Professional Football League runners-up

Associations eligible to enter one team
Association	Rank (Pts)	Team	Qualifying method
Ivory Coast	13 (21)	ASEC Mimosas	2022–23 Côte d'Ivoire Ligue 1 champions
Cameroon	14 (16)	Coton Sport	2022–23 Elite One champions
Zambia	15 (15)	Power Dynamos	2022–23 Zambian Super League champions
Congo	16 (9.5)	AS Otohô	2022–23 Congo Ligue 1 champions
Senegal	17 (9)	Génération Foot	2022–23 Senegal Ligue 1 champions
Mali	18 (7)	Real Bamako	2022–23 Malian Première Division champions
Togo	19 (5)	ASKO Kara	2022–23 Togolese Championnat National champions
Uganda	19 (5)	Vipers	2022–23 Uganda Premier League champions
Botswana	21 (4)	Jwaneng Galaxy	2022–23 Botswana Premier League champions
Burkina Faso	23 (2)	AS Douanes Ouagadougou	2022–23 Burkinabé Premier League champions
Eswatini	23 (2)	Green Mamba	2022–23 Eswatini Premier League champions
Niger	23 (2)	AS GNN	2022–23 Niger Premier League champions
Benin	27 (1)	Coton FC	2022–23 Benin Premier League champions
Ghana	27 (1)	Medeama	2022–23 Ghana Premier League champions
Mauritania	27 (1)	FC Nouadhibou	2022–23 Ligue 1 Mauritania champions
Burundi	—	Bumamuru	2022–23 Burundi Ligue A champions
Comoros	—	Djabal	2023 Comoros Premier League champions
Djibouti	—	Djibouti Telecom	2022–23 Djibouti Premier League champions
Equatorial Guinea	—	Dragón	2022–23 Equatoguinean Primera División champions
Ethiopia	—	Saint George	2022–23 Ethiopian Premier League champions
Gabon	—	Centre Sportif de Bendje	2022–23 Gabon Championnat National D1 champions
Liberia	—	LISCR	2022–23 Liberian First Division champions
Malawi	—	Nyasa Big Bullets	2022 Super League of Malawi champions
Mozambique	—	UD Songo	2022 Moçambola champions
Namibia	—	African Stars	2022-23 Namibia Premier Football League champions
Rwanda	—	APR	2022–23 Rwanda Premier League champions
Sierra Leone	—	Bo Rangers	2023 Sierra Leone National Premier League champions
Somalia	—	Gaadiidka	2022–23 Somali First Division champions
South Sudan	—	Salaam FC Bor	2023 South Sudan Football Championship champions
Zanzibar	—	KMKM	2022–23 Zanzibar Premier League champions

Associations which did not enter a team

- Cape Verde
- Central African Republic
- Chad
- Eritrea
- Gambia
- Guinea-Bissau
- Kenya
- Lesotho
- Madagascar
- Mauritius
- Réunion
- São Tomé and Príncipe
- Seychelles
- Zimbabwe

== Schedule ==
Schedule for 2023–24 CAF Champions League
Phase	Round	Draw date	First leg	Second leg
Qualifying rounds	First round	25 July 2023	18–20 August 2023	25–27 August 2023
Qualifying rounds	Second round	25 July 2023	15–17 September 2023	29 September – 1 October 2023
Group stage	Matchday 1	6 October 2023	24–25 November 2023	
Group stage	Matchday 2	6 October 2023	1–2 December 2023	
Group stage	Matchday 3	6 October 2023	8–9 December 2023	
Group stage	Matchday 4	6 October 2023	19 December 2023	
Group stage	Matchday 5	6 October 2023	23–24 February 2024	
Group stage	Matchday 6	6 October 2023	1–2 March 2024	
Knockout stage	Quarter-finals	12 March 2024	29–30 March 2024	5–6 April 2024
Knockout stage	Semi-finals	12 March 2024	20 April 2024	26 April 2024
Knockout stage	Final	12 March 2024	18 May 2024	25 May 2024

== Qualifying rounds ==
The draw for the qualifying rounds was held on 25 July 2023, 11:00 GMT (14:00 local time, UTC+3), at the CAF headquarters in Cairo, Egypt. In the qualifying rounds, each tie was played on a home-and-away two-legged basis. If the aggregate score was tied after the second leg, the away goals rule was applied, and if still tied, extra time was not played, and a penalty shoot-out was used to determine the winner (Regulations III. 13 & 14).

=== First round ===
Team 1	Agg.	Team 2	1st leg	2nd leg
Hafia (Guinea)	2–2 (a)	(Senegal) Génération Foot	0–0	2–2
AS GNN (Niger)	w/o (Note: AS Douanes Burkina Faso won on a walkover after Niger clubs withdrew from 2023–24 CAF interclub competitions due to the 2023 Nigerien coup d'état.)	AS Douanes Burkina Faso	—	—
Bo Rangers (Sierra Leone)	2–1	(Liberia) LISCR	1–1	1–0
Medeama (Ghana)	1–1 (3–2 p)	(Nigeria) Remo Stars	1–0	0–1
KMKM (Zanzibar)	2–5	(Ethiopia) Saint George	1–2	1–3
APR (Rwanda)	3–1	(Somalia) Gaadiidka	1–1	2–0
Centre Sportif de Bendje (Gabon)	2–6	(Burundi) Bumamuru	1–1	1–5
African Stars (Namibia)	2–2 (a)	(Zambia) Power Dynamos	2–1	0–1
UD Songo (Mozambique)	2–1	(Eswatini) Green Mamba	1–0	1–1
Dragón (Equatorial Guinea)	0–3	(Malawi) Nyasa Big Bullets	0–2	0–1
Al Ahly Benghazi (Libya)	4–3	(Nigeria) Enyimba	4–3	0–0
Coton FC (Benin)	0–2	(Ivory Coast) ASEC Mimosas	0–0	0–2
CS Constantine (Algeria)	0–3	(Tunisia) Étoile du Sahel	0–2	0–1
ASKO Kara (Togo)	0–8	(Morocco) ASFAR	0–1	0–7
Real Bamako (Mali)	2–0	(Cameroon) Coton Sport	0–0	2–0
FC Nouadhibou (Mauritania)	2–1	(Libya) Al Ahli Tripoli	2–0	0–1
Primeiro de Agosto (Angola)	2–1	(Democratic Republic of the Congo) AS Vita Club	1–0	1–1
Salaam FC Bor (South Sudan)	w/o (Note: Al Hilal won on a walkover after Salaam FC Bor failed to travel to Morocco.)	(Sudan) Al Hilal	—	—
AS Otohô (Republic of the Congo)	1–1 (a)	(Sudan) Al Merrikh	1–1	0–0
Djibouti Telecom	1–7	(Tanzania) Young Africans	0–2	1–5
Jwaneng Galaxy (Botswana)	3–2	(Uganda) Vipers	2–0	1–2
Djabal (Comoros)	0–4	(South Africa) Orlando Pirates	0–1	0–3

=== Second round ===
The 16 winners of the second round advanced to the group stage.

Team 1	Agg.	Team 2	1st leg	2nd leg
Hafia (Guinea)	1–4	(Morocco) Wydad AC	1–1	0–3
AS Douanes Burkina Faso	0–1	(Tunisia) Espérance de Tunis	0–1	0–0
Bo Rangers (Sierra Leone)	2–6	(Algeria) CR Belouizdad	1–3	1–3
Medeama (Ghana)	4–3	(Guinea) Horoya	3–1	1–2
Saint George (Ethiopia)	0–7	(Egypt) Al Ahly	0–3	0–4
APR (Rwanda)	1–6	(Egypt) Pyramids	0–0	1–6
Bumamuru (Burundi)	0–6	(South Africa) Mamelodi Sundowns	0–4	0–2
Power Dynamos (Zambia)	3–3 (a)	(Tanzania) Simba	2–2	1–1
UD Songo (Mozambique)	2–5	(Angola) Petro de Luanda	1–2	1–3
Nyasa Big Bullets (Malawi)	0–5	(Democratic Republic of the Congo) TP Mazembe	0–1	0–4
Al Ahly Benghazi (Libya)	1–2	(Ivory Coast) ASEC Mimosas	0–0	1–2
Étoile du Sahel (Tunisia)	3–1	(Morocco) ASFAR	1–0	2–1
Real Bamako (Mali)	1–4	(Mauritania) FC Nouadhibou	0–3	1–1
Primeiro de Agosto (Angola)	1–2	(Sudan) Al Hilal	0–0	1–2
Al Merrikh (Sudan)	0–3	(Tanzania) Young Africans	0–2	0–1
Jwaneng Galaxy (Botswana)	1–1 (5–4 p)	(South Africa) Orlando Pirates	1–0	0–1

== Group stage ==
The draw for the group stage was held on 6 October 2023, 13:00 GMT (15:00 local time, UTC+2), in Johannesburg, South Africa. The 16 winners of the second round of qualifying rounds were drawn into four groups of four.

The teams were seeded by their performances in the CAF competitions for the previous five seasons (CAF 5-year ranking points shown next to every team). Each group contained one team from each of Pot 1, Pot 2, Pot 3, and Pot 4, and each team was allocated to the positions in their group according to their pot.

Pot 1
Team	Pts
(Egypt) Al Ahly	83
(Morocco) Wydad AC	74
(Tunisia) Espérance de Tunis	56
(South Africa) Mamelodi Sundowns	51

Pot 2
Team	Pts
(Algeria) CR Belouizdad	36
(Egypt) Pyramids	35
(Tanzania) Simba	35
(Angola) Petro de Luanda	33.5

Pot 3
Team	Pts
(Democratic Republic of the Congo) TP Mazembe	30.5
(Sudan) Al Hilal	23
(Ivory Coast) ASEC Mimosas	20
(Tanzania) Young Africans	20

Pot 4
Team	Pts
(Tunisia) Étoile du Sahel	20
(Botswana) Jwaneng Galaxy	4
(Mauritania) FC Nouadhibou	1
(Ghana) Medeama	—

In the group stage, each group was played on a home-and-away round-robin basis. The winners and runners-up of each group advanced to the quarter-finals of the knockout stage.

=== Tiebreakers ===
The teams were ranked according to points (3 points for a win, 1 point for a draw, 0 points for a loss). If tied on points, tiebreakers were applied in the following order (Regulations III. 20 & 21):

1. Points in head-to-head matches among tied teams;
2. Goal difference in head-to-head matches among tied teams;
3. Goals scored in head-to-head matches among tied teams;
4. Away goals scored in head-to-head matches among tied teams;
5. If more than two teams were tied, and after applying all head-to-head criteria above, a subset of teams were still tied, all head-to-head criteria above were reapplied exclusively to this subset of teams;
6. Goal difference in all group matches;
7. Goals scored in all group matches;
8. Away goals scored in all group matches;
9. Drawing of lots.

Tiebreakers
The teams were ranked according to points (3 points for a win, 1 point for a draw, 0 points for a loss). If tied on points, tiebreakers were applied in the following order (Regulations III. 20 & 21):
1. Points in head-to-head matches among tied teams;
2. Goal difference in head-to-head matches among tied teams;
3. Goals scored in head-to-head matches among tied teams;
4. Away goals scored in head-to-head matches among tied teams;
5. If more than two teams were tied, and after applying all head-to-head criteria above, a subset of teams were still tied, all head-to-head criteria above were reapplied exclusively to this subset of teams;
6. Goal difference in all group matches;
7. Goals scored in all group matches;
8. Away goals scored in all group matches;
9. Drawing of lots.

=== Group A ===
Pos	Team	Pld	W	D	L	GF	GA	GD	Pts	Qualification	SUN	TPM	NDB	PYR
1	(South Africa) Mamelodi Sundowns	6	4	1	1	7	1	+6	13	Advance to knockout stage	—	1–0	3–0	0–0
2	(Democratic Republic of the Congo) TP Mazembe	6	3	1	2	6	2	+4	10	Advance to knockout stage	1–0	—	2–0	3–0
3	(Mauritania) FC Nouadhibou	6	1	2	3	4	9	−5	5 (Note: Ranked on head-to-head points: FC Nouadhibou 4, Pyramids 1.)		0–2	0–0	—	2–0
4	(Egypt) Pyramids	6	1	2	3	3	8	−5	5		0–1	1–0	2–2	—

Source: CAF

=== Group B ===
Pos	Team	Pld	W	D	L	GF	GA	GD	Pts	Qualification	ASE	SIM	WAC	JWA
1	(Ivory Coast) ASEC Mimosas	6	3	2	1	7	2	+5	11	Advance to knockout stage	—	0–0	1–0	3–0
2	(Tanzania) Simba	6	2	3	1	9	2	+7	9 (Note: Ranked on head-to-head goal difference: Simba +1, Wydad AC –1.)	Advance to knockout stage	1–1	—	2–0	6–0
3	(Morocco) Wydad AC	6	3	0	3	3	4	−1	9		1–0	1–0	—	0–1
4	(Botswana) Jwaneng Galaxy	6	1	1	4	1	12	−11	4		0–2	0–0	0–1	—

Source: CAF

=== Group C ===
Pos	Team	Pld	W	D	L	GF	GA	GD	Pts	Qualification	APL	EST	HIL	ESS
1	(Angola) Petro de Luanda	6	3	3	0	5	0	+5	12	Advance to knockout stage	—	0–0	1–0	2–0
2	(Tunisia) Espérance de Tunis	6	3	2	1	6	3	+3	11	Advance to knockout stage	0–0	—	1–0	2–0
3	(Sudan) Al Hilal	6	1	2	3	4	5	−1	5		0–0	3–1	—	1–1
4	(Tunisia) Étoile du Sahel	6	1	1	4	2	9	−7	4		0–2	0–2	1–0	—

Source: CAF

=== Group D ===
Pos	Team	Pld	W	D	L	GF	GA	GD	Pts	Qualification	AHL	YNG	CRB	MED
1	(Egypt) Al Ahly	6	3	3	0	6	1	+5	12	Advance to knockout stage	—	1–0	0–0	3–0
2	(Tanzania) Young Africans	6	2	2	2	9	6	+3	8 (Note: Ranked on head-to-head goal difference: Young Africans +1, CR Belouizdad –1.)	Advance to knockout stage	1–1	—	4–0	3–0
3	(Algeria) CR Belouizdad	6	2	2	2	7	6	+1	8		0–0	3–0	—	3–0
4	(Ghana) Medeama	6	1	1	4	3	12	−9	4		0–1	1–1	2–1	—

Source: CAF

== Knockout stage ==
The mechanism of the draws for each round was as follows:

- In the draw for the quarter-finals, the four group winners were seeded, and the four group runners-up were unseeded. The seeded teams were drawn against the unseeded teams, with the seeded teams hosting the second leg. Teams from the same group could not be drawn against each other, while teams from the same association could be drawn against each other.
- In the draws for semi-finals, there were no seedings, and teams from the same group or the same association could be drawn against each other. As the draws for the quarter-finals and semi-finals were held together before the quarter-finals were played, the identity of the quarter-final winners was not known at the time of the semi-final draw.

Group	Winners	Runners-up
A	(South African Football Association) Mamelodi Sundowns	(Congolese Association Football Federation) TP Mazembe
B	(Ivorian Football Federation) ASEC Mimosas	(Tanzania Football Federation) Simba
C	(Angolan Football Federation) Petro de Luanda	(Tunisian Football Federation) Espérance de Tunis
D	(Egyptian Football Association) Al Ahly	(Tanzania Football Federation) Young Africans

=== Bracket ===
The bracket was decided after the draw for the knockout stage which was held on 12 March 2024.

Quarter-finals
(Tunisian Football Federation) Espérance de Tunis (p)	0	0	0 (4)
(Ivorian Football Federation) ASEC Mimosas	0	0	0 (2)
(Tanzania Football Federation) Young Africans	0	0	0 (2)
(South African Football Association) Mamelodi Sundowns (p)	0	0	0 (3)
(Congolese Association Football Federation) TP Mazembe	0	2	2
(Angolan Football Federation) Petro de Luanda	0	1	1
(Tanzania Football Federation) Simba	0	0	0
(Egyptian Football Association) Al Ahly	1	2	3

Semi-finals
(Tunisian Football Federation) Espérance de Tunis	1	1	2
(South African Football Association) Mamelodi Sundowns	0	0	0
(Congolese Association Football Federation) TP Mazembe	0	0	0
(Egyptian Football Association) Al Ahly	0	3	3

Final
(Tunisian Football Federation) Espérance de Tunis	0	0	0
(Egyptian Football Association) Al Ahly	0	1	1

=== Quarter-finals ===
Team 1	Agg.	Team 2	1st leg	2nd leg
Simba (Tanzania)	0–3	(Egypt) Al Ahly	0–1	0–2
TP Mazembe (Democratic Republic of the Congo)	2–1	(Angola) Petro de Luanda	0–0	2–1
Espérance de Tunis (Tunisia)	0–0 (4–2 p)	(Ivory Coast) ASEC Mimosas	0–0	0–0
Young Africans (Tanzania)	0–0 (2–3 p)	(South Africa) Mamelodi Sundowns	0–0	0–0

=== Semi-finals ===
Team 1	Agg.	Team 2	1st leg	2nd leg
Espérance de Tunis (Tunisia)	2–0	(South Africa) Mamelodi Sundowns	1–0	1–0
TP Mazembe (Democratic Republic of the Congo)	0–3	(Egypt) Al Ahly	0–0	0–3

=== Final ===
The first leg was played on 18 May, and the second leg was played on 25 May 2024.

Team 1	Agg.	Team 2	1st leg	2nd leg
Espérance de Tunis (Tunisia)	0–1	(Egypt) Al Ahly	0–0	0–1

18 May 2024
20:00 UTC+1

Espérance de Tunis (Tunisia)	0–0	(Egypt) Al Ahly
	Report

Stade Hammadi Agrebi, Tunis
Attendance: 35,000
Referee: Mustapha Ghorbal (Algeria)
25 May 2024
20:00 UTC+3

Al Ahly (Egypt)	1–0	(Tunisia) Espérance de Tunis
Aholou 4' (o.g.)	Report

Cairo International Stadium, Cairo
Attendance: 52,000
Referee: Jean-Jacques Ndala (DR Congo)

Al Ahly won 1–0 on aggregate.

== Top goalscorers ==
Team eliminated / inactive for this round.

Rank	Player	Team	MD1	MD2	MD3	MD4	MD5	MD6	QF1	QF2	SF1	SF2	F1	F2	Total
1	(Ivory Coast) Sankara Karamoko	(Ivory Coast) ASEC Mimosas		1	2	1									4
2	(Algeria) Abdelraouf Benguit	(Algeria) CR Belouizdad	1	1				1							3
2	(Egypt) Hussein El Shahat	(Egypt) Al Ahly	1				1	1							3
2	(Brazil) Yan Sasse	(Tunisia) Espérance de Tunis	1				1				1				3
2	(Ivory Coast) Pacôme Zouzoua	(Tanzania) Young Africans		1	1	1									3

== See also ==
- 2023–24 CAF Confederation Cup
- 2023 African Football League
- 2023 CAF Women's Champions League
- 2024 CAF Super Cup
