= Nana Kofi Babil =

Ghanaian footballer

Personal information
- Full name: Nana Kofi Babil
- Date of birth: January 4, 2002 (age 24)
- Place of birth: Ghana
- Height: 1.79 m (5 ft 10 in)
- Position: Left winger

Team information
- Current team: Medeama
- Number: 20

Youth career
- Charity FC

Senior career*
Years	Team	Apps	(Gls)
2019–2021	Medeama	12	(4)
2020–2021	→ SCR Altach (loan)	2	(0)
2021–2022	Aluminij	1	(0)
2023–	Medeama	8	(0)
- * Club domestic league appearances and goals as of October 25, 2023

Nana Kofi Babil (born January 4, 2002) is a Ghanaian footballer who plays as a winger for Medeama.

== Playing career ==
Babil joined Medeama SC from a lower division side called Charity FC in December 2019 ahead of the 2019–20 Ghana Premier League season. He signed a three-year contract. He featured prominently for the club in their Ghana Premier League campaign which was cancelled due to the COVID-19 pandemic. He scored 4 goals for Medeama before the league was called off. He made his debut on December 29, 2019, coming on in the 69th minute for Ebenezer Ackahbi. Babil registered his first goal in the Ghanaian top-flight division when he netted a 90th-minute goal for Medeama in their 3–1 win over Cape Coast Ebusua Dwarfs on December 29, 2019. He enhanced his scoring credentials when he climbed off the bench to score the third goal for his side against Accra Hearts of Oak in a 3–0 win in early January 2020. His other goals in the Ghana Premier League came against Liberty Professionals on January 11, 2020 and International Allies on February 19, 2020. In January 2020, Babil was named in the Ghana Premier League Team of the Week by Ghanaian football web portal 442 Ghana. On March 16, 2020, the Ghana Football Association's disciplinary committee deducted points from Medeama for fielding Nana Babil in a league game against Accra Great Olympics because he was deemed unqualified to have featured in the game.

In July 2020, Babil joined Austrian side SCR Altach on a season-long loan.

In August 2021, Babil signed a two-year contract with Slovenian PrvaLiga side Aluminij.
