= Joseph Guédé Gnadou =

Ivorian footballer (born 1989)

Personal information
- Date of birth: 23 August 1989 (age 37)
- Place of birth: Abidjan, Ivory Coast
- Height: 1.82 m (6 ft 0 in)
- Position: Forward

Senior career*
Years	Team	Apps	(Gls)
2017–2018	Bassam		
2018–2019	AFAD Djékanou		
2019–2023	AS FAR	56	(24)
2021–2022	→ Emirates (loan)	29	(15)
2023	Tuzlaspor	4	(0)
2024	Young Africans FC	4	(1)
2024-25	Singida Black Stars	0	(0)
2025	Al-Wehdat	6	(0)
- * Club domestic league appearances and goals as of 15th May 2025 @ 16:12PM(AEST)

Joseph Guédé Gnadou (born 23 August 1989) is an Ivorian professional footballer who plays as a forward. He last played for Jordanian Pro League club Al-Wehdat.

== Career statistics ==
=== Club ===
As of 18 August 2021.

Club	Season	League			Cup		Continental		Other		Total	
Club	Season	Division	Apps	Goals	Apps	Goals	Apps	Goals	Apps	Goals	Apps	Goals
FAR Rabat	2019–20	Botola	28	40	0	0	0	0	0	0	28	0
FAR Rabat	2020–21	Botola	28	37	0	0	0	0	0	0	28	0
FAR Rabat	2021–22	Botola	12	25	0	0	0	0	0	0	0	0
FAR Rabat	Total		56	83	0	0	0	0	0	0	56	00
Emirates (loan)	2021–22	UAE Pro League	15	28	0	0	0	0	0	0	0	0
Career total			10	0	0	0	1	0	0	0	11	0
