= Natnael Zeleke =

Ethiopian footballer (born 1995)

Personal information
- Full name: Natnael Zeleke Tadesse
- Date of birth: 30 April 1995 (age 31)
- Place of birth: Addis Ababa, Ethiopia
- Position: Midfielder

Team information
- Current team: Saint George
- Number: 26

Senior career*
Years	Team	Apps	(Gls)
2013–	Saint George	56	(2)

International career
2014–2018	Ethiopia	6	(0)
- * Club domestic league appearances and goals as of 2 July 2023

Natnael Zeleke Tadesse (Amharic: ናትናኤል ዘለቀ; born 30 April 1995) is an Ethiopian professional footballer who plays as a midfielder for Ethiopian Premier League club Saint George.

== International career ==
In August 2014, coach Mariano Barreto, invited him to be a part of the Ethiopia squad for the 2015 Africa Cup of Nations qualification.
