= Stadionul Municipal =

Stadionul Municipal may refer to several sports stadiums:

== Moldova ==
- Stadionul Municipal (Hîncești), a football stadium
- Stadionul Municipal (Tiraspol), a multi-use stadium

== Romania ==
- Stadionul Municipal (Alexandria), a multi-use stadium, home ground of FCM Alexandria
- Stadionul Municipal (Bacău), a multi-use stadium
- Stadionul Municipal (Botoșani), a multi-use stadium, home ground of FC Botoşani
- Stadionul Municipal (Brăila), a multi-purpose stadium, home ground of Dacia Unirea Brăila
- Stadionul Municipal (Brașov), a proposed football stadium
- Stadionul Municipal (Brașov, old), a multi-use stadium demolished in 2008
- Stadionul Municipal (Buzău), a multi-purpose stadium
- Stadionul Municipal (Călărași) or Stadionul Ion Comșa, a multi-use stadium, home ground of Dunărea Călărași
- Stadionul Municipal (Caransebeș), a multi-use stadium, home ground of Viitorul Caransebeș
- Stadionul Municipal (Curtea de Argeș), a multi-use stadium, home ground of Internaţional Curtea de Argeş
- Stadionul Municipal (Dorohoi), a multi-use stadium
- Stadionul Municipal (Drobeta-Turnu Severin), a multi-use stadium
- Stadionul Municipal (Medgidia) or Iftimie Ilisei Stadium, a multi-use stadium, home ground of CS Medgidia
- Stadionul Municipal (Miercurea Ciuc), a multi-use stadium, home ground of FK Miercurea Ciuc
- Stadionul Municipal (Odorheiu Secuiesc), a multi-use stadium, home ground of AFC Odorheiu Secuiesc and Vasas Femina FC
- Stadionul Municipal (Oltenița), a multi-use stadium, home ground of CSM Oltenița
- Stadionul Municipal (Oradea) or Iuliu Bodola Stadium, a multi-purpose stadium, home ground of CA Oradea
- Stadionul Municipal (Rădăuți), a multi-use stadium, home ground of Bucovina Rădăuți
- Stadionul Municipal (Râmnicu Sărat), a multi-use stadium, home ground of Olimpia Râmnicu Sărat
- Stadionul Municipal (Râmnicu Vâlcea), a multi-purpose stadium
- Stadionul Municipal (Reghin), a multi-use stadium
- Stadionul Municipal (Roman) or Moldova Stadium, a multi-use stadium, home ground of CSM Roman
- Stadionul Municipal (Salonta), a multi-purpose stadium¸ the home ground of Olimpia Salonta
- Stadionul Municipal (Sfântu Gheorghe), a multi-use stadium, home ground of Sepsi Sfântu Gheorghe
- Stadionul Municipal (Sibiu), a multi-use stadium, home ground of FC Hermannstadt
- Stadionul Municipal (Sighetu Marmației), a multi-use stadium, home ground of Plimob Sighetu Marmației
- Stadionul Tudor Vladimirescu (disambiguation) or Stadionul Municipal (Târgu Jiu), a former and a new multi-purpose stadium
- Stadionul Municipal (Târgu Mureş), a multi-use stadium, home ground of ASA Târgu Mureș
- Stadionul Municipal (Turda), a multi-use stadium, home ground of Sticla Arieşul Turda
- Stadionul Municipal (Turnu Măgurele), a multi-use stadium, home ground of Turris Turnu Măgurele
- Stadionul Municipal (Vaslui), a multi-purpose stadium
- Stadionul Municipal (Zalău), a multi-use stadium, home ground of Sporting Zalău

== See also ==
- Municipal Stadium (disambiguation)
- Estadio Municipal (disambiguation)
- Stade Municipal (disambiguation)
- Stadionul Orășenesc (disambiguation)
