= Stadio Comunale =

Stadio Comunale is Italian for "municipal stadium", and may refer to a main stadium in many towns in Italy and Italian Switzerland. In particular:

== Italy ==
- Stadio Tommaso Fattori, L'Aquila
- Stadio Città di Arezzo, Arezzo
- Stadio Renato Dall'Ara, Bologna
- Stadio Sant'Elia, Cagliari
- Stadio Comunale (Chiavari)
- Stadio Artemio Franchi (Florence)
- Stadio Luigi Ferraris, Genoa
- Stadio Olimpico Comunale, Grosseto
- Nuovo Stadio Comunale (Lumezzane)
- Stadio Comunale Giovanni Celeste, Messina
- Stadio Marcello Melani, Pistoia
- Stadio Comunale (Pizzighettone)
- Stadio Comunale Mario Battaglini, Rovigo
- Stadio Comunale (Teramo)
- Stadio Olimpico Grande Torino, Turin
- Stadio Comunale di Monigo, Treviso
- Stadio Comunale, Mogliano Veneto

== Switzerland ==
- Stadio Comunale Bellinzona
- Stadio Comunale (Chiasso)
- Stadio del Lido, Locarno

== See also ==
- Category:Sports venues in Italy
- Municipal Stadium (disambiguation)
- Stade Municipal (disambiguation)
- Estadio Municipal (disambiguation)
