= Stade Municipal =

Stade Municipal (literally 'municipal stadium') is a generic name for municipally owned, constructed, or operated sport stadia in French-speaking countries.

== Benin ==
- Stade Municipale (Porto-Novo), in Porto-Novo

== Burkina Faso ==
- Stade Municipal (Ouagadougou), in Ouagadougou
- Stade Municipal (Bobo Dioulasso), in Bobo Dioulasso

== Cameroon ==
- Stade Municipal (Bafang), in Bafang
- Stade Municipal de Bamendzi, in Bafoussam
- Stade Municipal de Guider, in Guider
- Stade Municipal (Akonolinga), in Akonolinga
- Stade Municipal (Dschang), in Dschang
- Stade Municipal (Foumban), in Foumban
- Stade Municipal (Maroua), in Maroua
- Stade Municipal (Yaoundé), in Yaounde

== Canada ==
- Stade Canac, formerly Stade Municipal, Quebec City
- Stade Quillorama, formerly Stade Municipal, Trois-Rivières

== Democratic Republic of Congo ==
- Stade Municipal de Lubumbashi, in Lubumbashi
- Stade Municipal de Vita Kabasha, in Vita Kabasha

== Republic of the Congo ==
- Stade Municipal (Pointe-Noire), in Pointe-Noire

== Côte d'Ivoire ==
- Stade Municipal d'Abidjan, Abidjan
- Stade Municipal (Bingerville), in Bingerville
- Stade Municipal (Bouna), in Bouna
- Stade Municipal (Daloa), in Daloa
- Stade Municipal (Odienné), in Odienne
- Stade Municipal (San-Pédro), in San Pédro

== France ==
- Stade Municipal d'Albi
- Stade Municipal de Balma
- Stade Municipal du Ray, in Nice
- Stade Municipal Georges Lefèvre, in Saint-Germain-en-Laye
- Stade Municipal La Reole
- Stade Municipal (Saint-Estève)
- Stade Municipal Saint-Symphorien, in Metz
- Stadium Municipal, in Toulouse

== French Guiana ==
- Stade Municipal (Macouria), in Macouria
- Stade Municipal (Matoury), in Matoury
- Stade Municipal (Sinnamary), in Sinnamary

== Luxembourg ==
- Stade Municipal de la Ville de Differdange, in Differdange
- Stade Municipal (Oberkorn), in Oberkorn
- Stade Municipal, Pétange, in Pétange
- Stade Municipal, Rumelange, in Rumelange
- Stade Municipal, Schifflange, in Schifflange
- Stade Josy Barthel, was called Stade Municipale until 1993

== Madagascar ==
- Stade Municipal de Mahamasina, in Antananarivo

== Mali ==
- Stade Municipal de Commune II, in Bamako
- Stade Municipal de Koulikoro, in Koulikoro
- Stade Municipal de USFAS, in Bamako

== Morocco ==
- Stade Municipal (Kenitra), in Kenitra

== Senegal ==
- Stade Municipal de Djourbel, in Djourbel
- Stade Municipal de Mbour, in Mbour
- Stade Municipal de Richard Toll, in Richard Toll

== Switzerland ==
- Stade Municipal (Yverdon), in Yverdon-les-Bains

== Togo ==
- Stade Municipal (Anié)
- Stade Municipal (Kara)
- Stade Municipal (Kpalimé)
- Stade Municipal (Lavié)
- Stade Municipal (Lomé)
- Stade Municipal (Niamtougou), in Niamtougou
- Stade Municipal (Notsé)
- Stade Municipal (Sansanne Mango)
- Stade Municipal (Sokodé)
- Stade Municipal (Womé)

== Tunisia ==
- Stade Municipal de Gabès, in Gabès

== See also ==
- Municipal Stadium (disambiguation)
- Estadio Municipal (disambiguation)
