= Stadionul Orășenesc =

Stadionul Orășenesc (English: City Stadium) can refer to:

Stadiums in Romania:

- Stadionul Orășenesc (Buftea)
- Stadionul Orășenesc (Mioveni)
- Stadionul Orășenesc (Ovidiu)

Stadiums in Moldova:

- Stadionul Orășenesc (Bălți)
- Stadionul Orășenesc (Hîncești)
- Stadionul Orășenesc (Rîbnița)
- Stadionul Orășenesc (Tiraspol)

== See also ==
- Stadionul Municipal (disambiguation)
