= Ousmane Viera =

Ivorian footballer

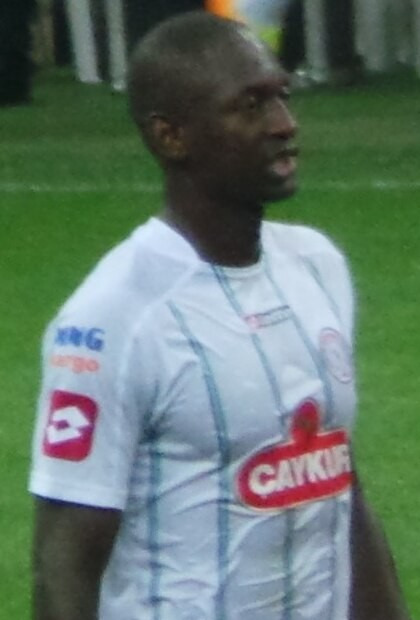
- Viera with Rizespor in 2013

Personal information
- Full name: Ousmane Viera Diarrassouba
- Date of birth: 21 December 1986 (age 39)
- Place of birth: Daloa, Ivory Coast
- Height: 1.86 m (6 ft 1 in)
- Position: Centre-back

Youth career
- –2003: Daloa

Senior career*
Years	Team	Apps	(Gls)
2003–2007	Daloa	83	(3)
2008–2010	CFR Cluj	12	(0)
2009–2010	→ Curtea de Argeș (loan)	30	(0)
2010–2013	Pandurii Târgu Jiu	91	(7)
2013–2016	Rizespor	83	(3)
2016–2017	Adanaspor	15	(0)
2018–2019	Sepsi OSK	46	(1)
2019–2021	Hermannstadt	56	(3)
Total		416	(17)

International career
2008	Ivory Coast Olympic	4	(0)
2012–2016	Ivory Coast	19	(1)
Medal record
Representing Ivory Coast
Men's football
Africa Cup of Nations
Winner	2015 Guinea
- * Club domestic league appearances and goals

Ousmane Viera Diarrassouba (born 21 December 1986) is an Ivorian former professional footballer who played as a centre-back. After beginning his career in Ivory Coast, he played for several clubs in Romania and Turkey, winning the Cupa României with CFR Cluj.

He represented the Ivory Coast national football team from 2012 to 2016, making 19 appearances and scoring one goal. He also participated in the 2014 FIFA World Cup and the 2015 Africa Cup of Nations, winning the latter tournament.

== Club career ==
=== RC Daloa ===
Viera was born on 21 December 1986 in Daloa, Ivory Coast. He began playing senior-level football at local club RC Daloa in 2003. Over the course of five seasons, he played 83 matches, scoring three goals in the Ivorian league.

=== CFR Cluj and Internațional Curtea de Argeș ===
In January 2008, Viera, along with compatriots Lacina Traoré, Emmanuel Koné and Lamine Camara, moved to Romania to join CFR Cluj. Viera made his Liga I debut on 1 March 2009 under coach Aleš Jindra in a 1–0 victory against Otopeni. At the end of the season, the team won the Cupa României, but coach Toni Conceição did not use Viera in the 3–0 win over Politehnica Timișoara in the final.

For the 2009–10 season, Viera and Emmanuel Koné were sent on loan by CFR to Internațional Curtea de Argeș.

=== Pandurii Târgu Jiu ===
In the summer of 2010, Viera joined Pandurii Târgu Jiu. He scored his first Liga I goal on 12 September 2011 in a 5–1 win over Mioveni. During the 2012–13 season, he netted a career-best four goals to help Pandurii finish in second place.

=== Rizespor and Adanaspor ===
In June 2013, Viera joined Turkish side Rizespor. He made his Süper Lig debut on 17 August under coach Rıza Çalımbay in a 1–0 win against Gençlerbirliği. On 20 April 2014, he scored his first goal in the competition in a 3–1 victory over Konyaspor. He played regularly for Rizespor during his three-season stint.

In the summer of 2016, Viera signed for Adanaspor, who had been promoted to the Turkish top flight. He spent one season with them, but could not avoid the team's relegation to the second league. His last appearance in the Turkish league took place on 3 June 2017 in Adanaspor's 3–1 loss to Fenerbahçe, bringing his total to 98 matches in the competition.

=== Sepsi OSK and Hermannstadt ===
After his spell in Turkey, Viera returned to Romania in January 2018 and joined Sepsi OSK. In June 2019, he moved to Hermannstadt. There, he made his last Liga I appearance on 19 May 2021 in a 1–0 win over Argeș Pitești, totaling 235 matches with 11 goals in the competition.

== International career ==
Viera was selected by coach Gérard Gili to be part of Ivory Coast's under-23 team during the 2008 Summer Olympics in Beijing. There, he played in four matches, as his side reached the quarter-finals, where they were defeated by Nigeria.

Viera made his debut for Ivory Coast on 7 September 2013 under coach Sabri Lamouchi in a 1–1 draw against Morocco during the successful 2014 World Cup qualifiers. He was named in Lamouchi's 23-man squad for the 2014 World Cup final tournament, but he did not play in a single match there. Subsequently, Viera played four games during the 2015 Africa Cup of Nations qualifiers, helping his side qualify to the final tournament. There, he played under coach Hervé Renard in the group-stage 1–0 win against Cameroon and later in the semi-final 3–1 victory over DR Congo. Ivory Coast ultimately won the tournament, though Viera did not feature in the final against Ghana.

When Kolo Touré retired from international football, he referred to Viera as the "new Minister of Defence." Viera scored his only international goal in a 2–0 friendly win against Angola. He went on to play three matches in the 2017 Africa Cup of Nations qualifiers and two during the 2018 World Cup qualifiers. Viera made his last appearance for the national team on 4 June 2016 in a 2–1 friendly victory over Gabon, totaling 19 matches with one goal for The Elephants.

== Career statistics ==
=== International ===
Appearances and goals by national team and year
National team	Year	Apps	Goals
Ivory Coast	2012	0	0
Ivory Coast	2013	1	0
Ivory Coast	2014	4	0
Ivory Coast	2015	11	1
Ivory Coast	2016	3	0
Total		19	1

Scores and results list Ivory Coast's goal tally first, score column indicates score after each Viera goal.

List of international goals scored by Ousmane Viera
#	Date	Venue	Opponent	Score	Result	Competition
1	26 March 2011	Stade Félix Houphouët-Boigny, Abidjan, Ivory Coast	Angola	1–0	2–0	Friendly

== Honours ==
CFR Cluj

- Cupa României: 2008–09

Ivory Coast

- Africa Cup of Nations: 2015
