= Fédéral Sporting FC du Noun =

Fédéral Noun
- Full name: Fédéral Sporting Football Club du Noun
- Ground: Stade Municipal; Foumban, Cameroon
- Capacity: 5,000
- League: Mezam Division III
- 2013/2014: 3rd

Fédéral Sporting Football Club du Noun is a Cameroonian football club based in Foumban. They are a member of the Cameroonian Football Federation.

== History ==
The club won 2005 the Cameroon Second Division and was promoted to the Elite One. Fédéral played two years in the Cameroon Premiere Division, before the club was relegated in 2007 to the Elite Two. Noun was after one season relegated to the Mezam Division III.

=== Stadium ===
The club played his home matches in the Foumban based Stade Municipal.
