= Gradski stadion =

Gradski Stadion (English: 'City Stadium') may refer to:

== Bosnia and Herzegovina ==
- Gradski stadion Banja Luka
- Gradski stadion (Bijeljina)
- Gradski stadion (Bileća), the stadium of FK Hercegovac
- Gradski stadion (Gradiška)
- Gradski stadion (Konjic), the stadium of FK Igman Konjic
- Gradski Stadion (Krupa na Vrbasu)
- Gradski stadion (Laktaši)
- Gradski stadion (Orašje)
- Gradski stadion (Prijedor)
- Gradski Stadion (Vitez)
- Gradski stadion (Žepče)
- Gradski stadion (Zvornik), the stadium of FK Drina Zvornik
- Gradski stadion Luke (Mrkonjić Grad)
- Gradski stadion Tušanj, Tuzla, Bosnia and Herzegovina

== Bulgaria ==
- Gradski stadion (Lovech), Lovech, Bulgaria
- Gradski stadion (Ruse), Ruse, Bulgaria

== Croatia ==
- Gradski stadion (Crikvenica)
- Gradski stadion (Koprivnica)
- Gradski stadion (Kutina)
- Gradski Vrt Stadium (Osijek), football stadium
- Gradski stadion (Osijek), former speedway stadium, adjacent to the football stadium
- Gradski stadion (Sinj)
- Gradski stadion (Sisak)
- Gradski stadion (Vrbovec), the stadium of NK Vrbovec
- Stadion Varteks, sometimes referred to as Gradski stadion (Varaždin) during international football matches

== Montenegro ==
- Gradski stadion (Berane)
- Gradski stadion (Bijelo Polje)
- Gradski stadion (Mojkovac)
- Gradski stadion (Nikšić)
- Gradski stadion (Pljevlja)

== North Macedonia ==
- Gradski stadion Gostivar
- Gradski Stadion Kavadarci
- Gradski stadion Kičevo
- Gradski stadion Kratovo
- Gradski Stadion Plaža
- Gradski stadion Skopje
- Gradski stadion Štip
- Gradski stadion Tetovo
- Gradski Stadium Kumanovo

== Serbia ==
- Gradski stadion (Kraljevo), the stadium of FK Sloga Kraljevo
- Gradski Stadion Subotica
- Gradski stadion Novi Pazar

== See also ==
- City Stadium (disambiguation)
