= Stadion Miejski =

Stadion Miejski (English: City Stadium or Municipal Stadium) may refer to various stadiums in Poland. Larger cities, such as Warsaw, Łódź and Kraków, may have two or more municipal stadiums.

- Stadion Miejski (Bełchatów)
- Stadion Miejski (Białystok)
- Stadion Miejski (Bielsko-Biała)
- Stadion Miejski Zawiszy (Bydgoszcz)
- Stadion Miejski (Chorzów)
- Stadion Miejski (Elbląg)
- Stadion Miejski (Gdańsk)
- Stadion Miejski (Gdynia)
- Stadion Miejski (Gliwice)
- Stadion Miejski (Grodzisk Wielkopolski)
- Stadion Miejski (Jastrzębie-Zdrój)
- Stadion Miejski (Kielce)
- Stadion Miejski Cracovii (Kraków)
- Stadion Miejski Hutnika (Kraków)
- Stadion Miejski Wisły (Kraków)
- Stadion Miejski ŁKS (Łódź)
- Stadion Miejski Widzewa (Łódź)
- Stadion Miejski (Łęczna)
- Stadion Miejski (Mielec)
- Stadion Miejski (Nisko)
- Stadion Miejski (Ostrowiec Świętokrzyski), also known as Miejski Stadion Sportowy "KSZO"
- Stadion Miejski (Płock)
- Stadion Miejski (Poznań)
- Stadion Miejski Warty (Poznań)
- Stadion Miejski (Stalowa Wola), also known as Podkarpackie Centrum Piłki Nożnej
- Stadion Miejski (Starachowice)
- Stadion Miejski (Szczecin)
- Stadion Miejski (Toruń)
- Stadion Miejski (Tychy)
- Stadion Miejski Legii (Warsaw), also known as Stadion Wojska Polskiego
- Stadion Miejski Polonii (Warsaw)
- Stadion Miejski (Wrocław)
- Stadion Miejski (Łódź)
- Stadion Miejski (Zabrze)
- Stadion Miejski (Ząbki)

== See also ==
- City Stadium (disambiguation)
- Municipal Stadium (disambiguation)
