= Oltenița =

- Municipality
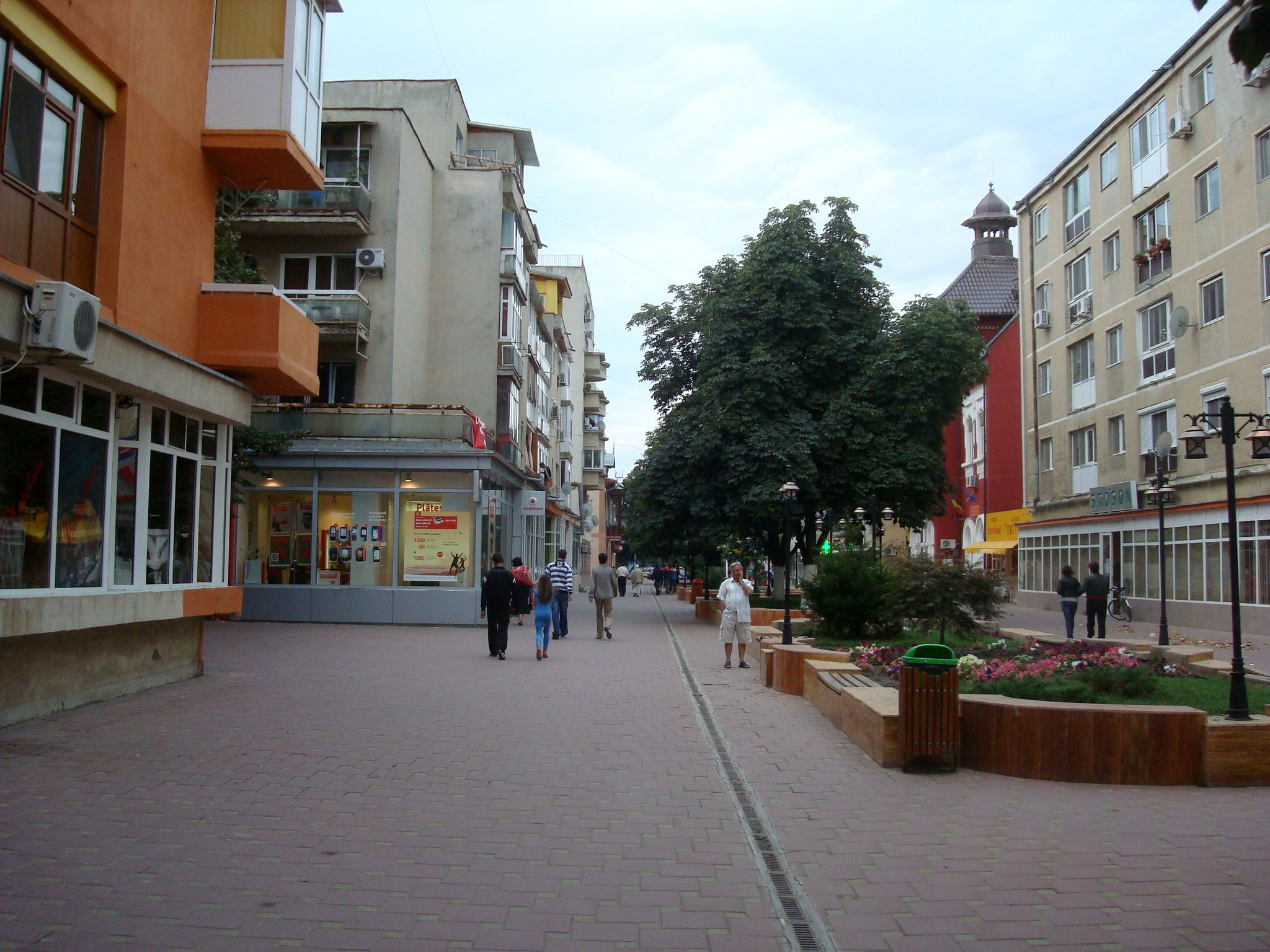
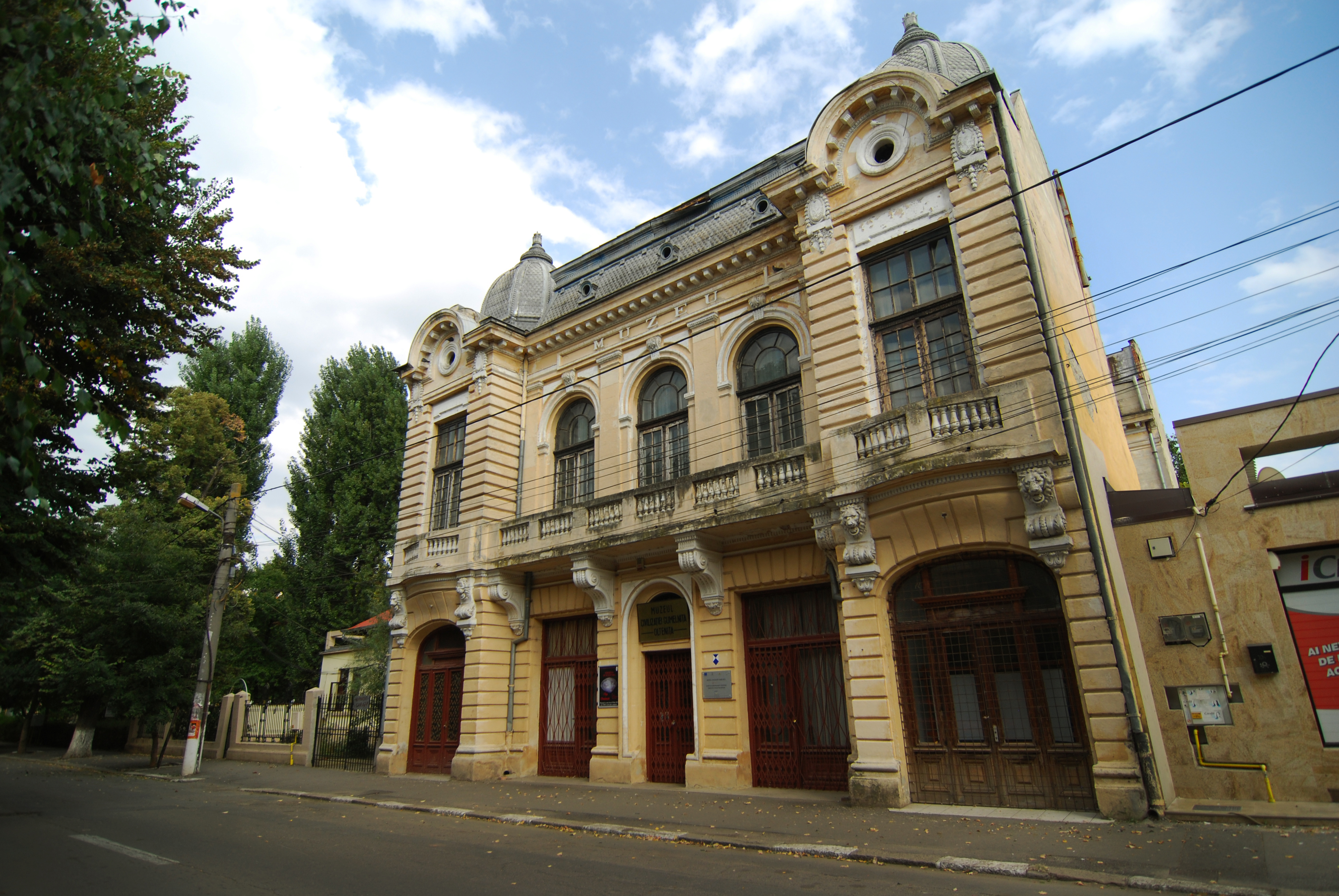
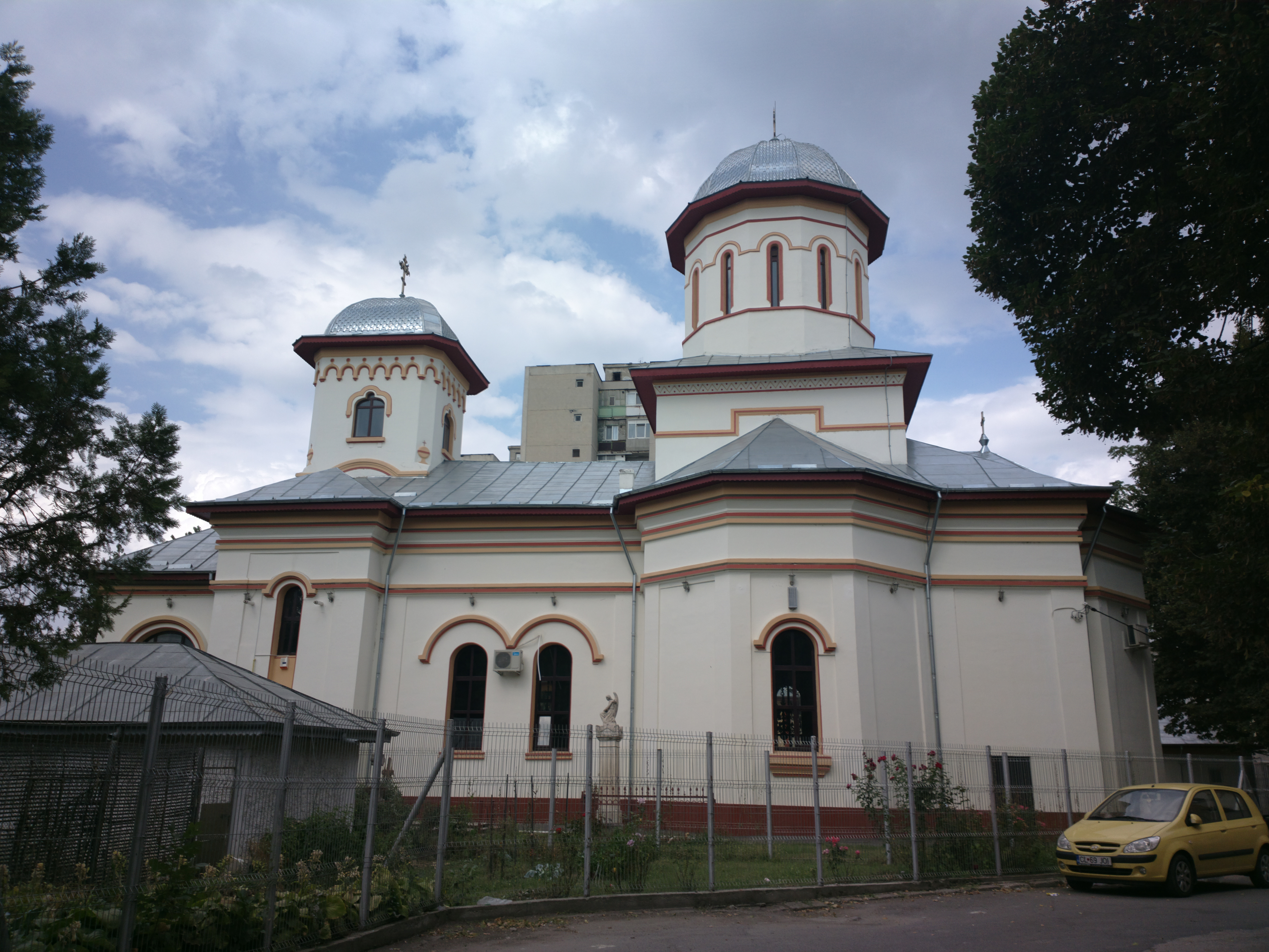
- City center Archaeology Museum St. Nicholas Church

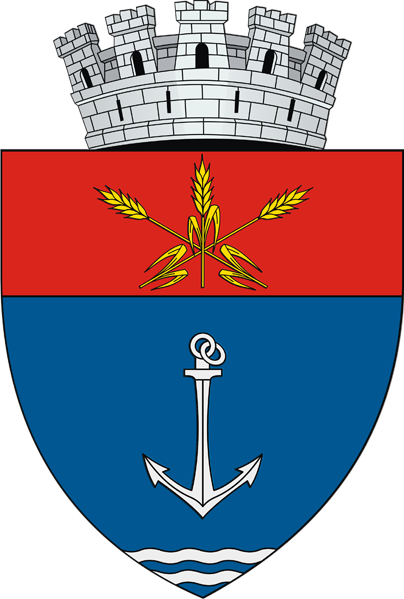
- Coat of arms

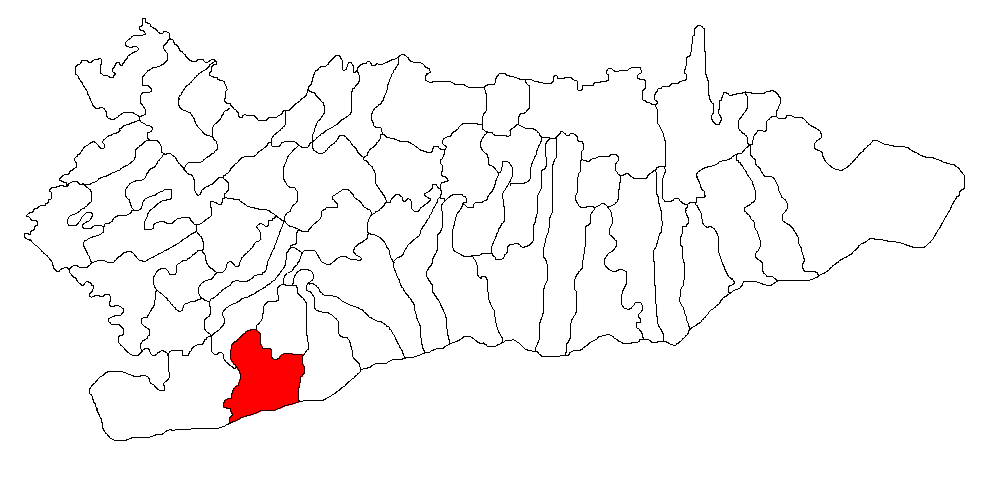
- Location of Oltenița within Călărași County

- Location in Romania
- Coordinates: 44°05′12″N 26°38′12″E
- Country: Romania
- County: Călărași

Government
  - Mayor (2024–2028): Mihăiță Beștea (PSD)
- Area: 109.55 km^{2} (42.30 sq mi)
- Elevation: 5 m (16 ft)
- Population (2021-12-01): 22,624
  - Density: 206.52/km^{2} (534.88/sq mi)
- Time zone: UTC+02:00 (EET)
  - Summer (DST): UTC+03:00 (EEST)
- Postal code: 915400
- Area code: (+40) 02 42
- Vehicle reg.: CL
- Website: primariaoltenita.ro

Oltenița (Romanian pronunciation: [olˈtenitsa]) is a city in Călărași County, Muntenia, Romania, on the left bank of the river Argeș, where its waters flow into the Danube.

== Geography ==
The city is located in the southwestern part of the county; it stands across the Danube from the Bulgarian city of Tutrakan.

The national road DN4 connects Oltenița to Bucharest, 64 km (40 mi) to the northwest. Road DN31 connects it to the county seat, Călărași, 69 km (43 mi) to the east, and road DN41 connects it to Giurgiu, 76 km (47 mi) to the west.

The Oltenița train station, located near the intersection of those three roads, serves the CFR Line 801, which connects the city to Bucharest (Titan Sud and Obor stations).

Historical population
Year	Pop.	±%
1900	5,801	—
1912	6,574	+13.3%
1930	10,389	+58.0%
1948	10,284	−1.0%
1956	14,111	+37.2%
1966	18,623	+32.0%
1977	24,414	+31.1%
1992	31,821	+30.3%
2002	31,434	−1.2%
2011	24,822	−21.0%
2021	22,624	−8.9%
Source: Census data

== History ==
Excavations on Gumelnița hill near the city revealed a Neolithic settlement dating from the 4th millennium BC.

The first mention of a town bearing the name Oltenița appears in 1515 during the reign of Neagoe Basarab.

In November 1853, at the start of the Crimean War the Ottoman forces attempted to cross the river at this point and inflicted heavy losses on the Russian forces at the Battle of Oltenița.

During the Russo-Turkish War, 1877–1878, Oltenița was an important crossing point into Bulgaria for Romanian troops called to aid the Russian Army during the siege of the Pleven (Plevna) stronghold.

During World War I at Turtucaia, across the Danube from Oltenița, Battle of Turtucaia ended in a significant defeat for the Romanian Army and subsequently the garrisons of Oltenița and Turtucaia engaged in numerous artillery skirmishes.

== Education ==
There are three high schools in Oltenița: Neagoe Basarab National College, Ion Ghica Technologic High School, and Nicolae Bălcescu Technologic High School.

== Sports ==
Stadionul Municipal is the home ground of the football club CSM Oltenița and holds 2,500 people.

== Gallery ==
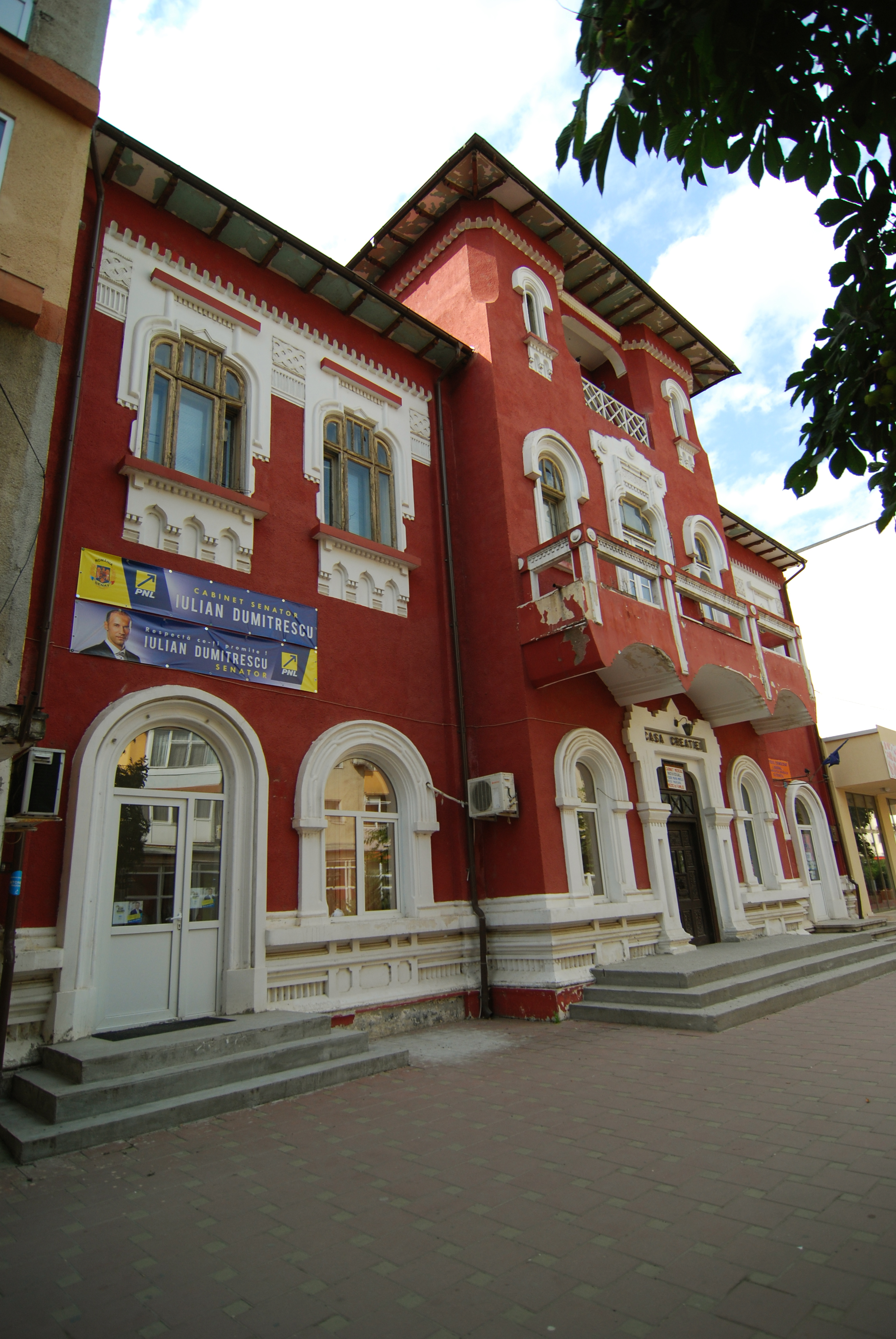
Health care facility

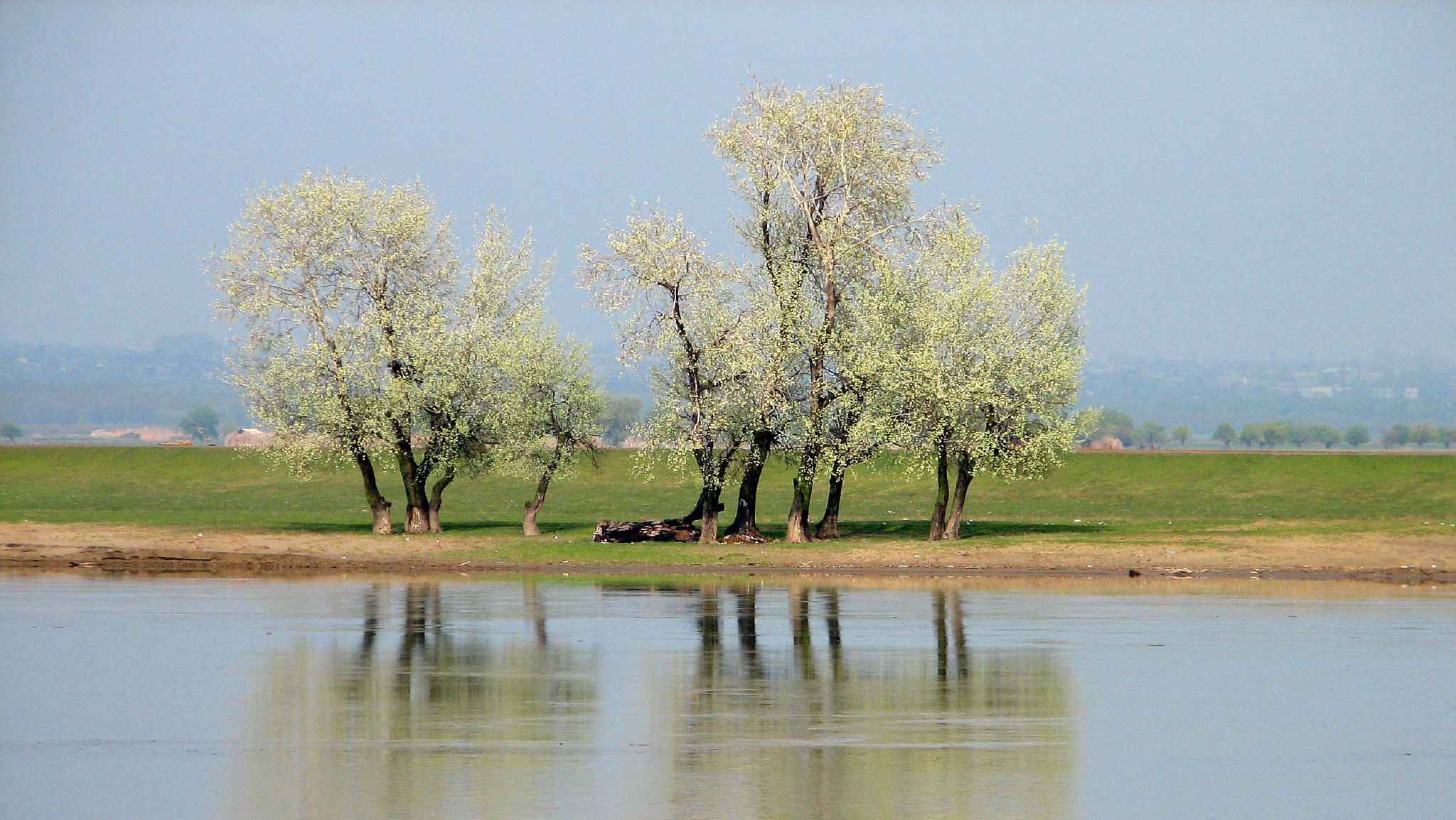
The Danube River near Oltenița

== Notable residents ==
- Peter A. Abeles (1886–1952), Jewish Romanian-American lawyer, politician, and judge
- Gabriela Cristea (born 1974), television personality and show host
- Ion Iliescu (1930–2025), 2nd President of Romania (1989–96 and 2000–04)
- Alice Săvulescu (1905–1970), scientist, titular member of the Romanian Academy
- Ion Petre Stoican (1930–1994), violinist, a lăutar
