= City Stadium =

City Stadium may refer to:

== Belarus ==
- City Stadium (Molodechno), a multi-use stadium
- City Stadium (Orsha), a multi-purpose stadium
- City Stadium (Slutsk), a multi-use stadium

== Montenegro ==
- City Stadium (Gusinje), a football stadium in Montenegro
- Podgorica City Stadium, Podgorica, Montenegro

== United Kingdom ==
- City Stadium, Bradford, a greyhound track in West Yorkshire, England
- Cardiff City Stadium, Cardiff, Wales
- City of Manchester Stadium, Manchester, England
- City Stadium (Livingston) or Almondvale Stadium, a football stadium in West Lothian, Scotland
- City Stadium, Norwich, a greyhound racing stadium in Norfolk, England

== United States ==
- City Stadium (Green Bay), Green Bay, Wisconsin
- City Stadium (Lynchburg), a sports venue in Virginia
- City Stadium (Richmond), Richmond, Virginia

== Elsewhere ==
- Nairobi City Stadium, Kenya
- City Stadium, Penang, Georgetown, Penang, Malaysia
- Skopje City Stadium or Philip II Arena, Skopje, North Macedonia
- City Stadium (Poznań) or Stadion Miejski, Poznań, Poland
- City Stadium, Ternopil or Ternopilsky Misky Stadion, Ternopil, Ukraine

== See also ==
- Central City Stadium (disambiguation)
- Gradski Stadion (disambiguation) ("City Stadium")
- Stadion Miejski (disambiguation) ("City Stadium")
