= Valentin Negru =

Romanian footballer

Personal information
- Full name: Valentin Marian Negru
- Date of birth: 4 September 1982 (age 44)
- Place of birth: Bucharest, Romania
- Height: 1.83 m (6 ft 0 in)
- Position: Midfielder

Youth career
- –2000: Sportul Studențesc

Senior career*
Years	Team	Apps	(Gls)
2000–2003	Sportul Studențesc	53	(2)
2004–2006	Rapid București	56	(5)
2007–2008	Unirea Urziceni	27	(0)
2008–2009	Otopeni	30	(2)
2009–2010	Politehnica Iași	21	(3)
2010–2011	Victoria Brănești	9	(1)
2011	Sportul Studențesc	7	(0)
2011–2012	Petrolul Ploiești	29	(2)
2012–2013	Gaz Metan Mediaș	16	(0)
2013–2014	Rapid București	39	(0)
2015	Viitorul Axintele		
Total		287	(15)

Managerial career
- 2015: Viitorul Axintele (player/coach)
- 2016–2017: CSM Oltenița
- 2018–2020: CS Progresul 05 (assistant)
- 2020: Rapid București (assistant)
- 2021: Hermannstadt (assistant)
- 2021–2022: Rapid II București
- 2022: Tunari
- 2023–2025: Hermannstadt (assistant)
- 2025: Hermannstadt (caretaker)
- * Club domestic league appearances and goals

Valentin Marian Negru (born 4 September 1982) is a former Romanian professional footballer who played as a midfielder.

== Honours ==
Sportul Studențesc

- Divizia B: 2000–01

Rapid București

- Cupa României: 2005–06

Unirea Urziceni

- Cupa României runner-up: 2007–08
