= CSM Oltenița =

Romanian football club

- Full name: Club Sportiv Municipal Oltenița
- Nicknames: Napoletanii (The Neapolitans); Oltenițenii (The People from Oltenița); Navaliștii (The Shipbuilders)
- Short name: Oltenița
- Founded: 1948; 78 years ago as Metalul Oltenița; 2012; 14 years ago as CSM Oltenița
- Ground: Municipal
- Capacity: 2,500
- Owner: Oltenița Municipality
- Chairman: Iulian Cudalbu
- Manager: Răzvan Huzuneanu
- League: Liga IV
- 2025–26: Liga IV, Călărași County, 3rd of 14
Home colours	Away colours

Club Sportiv Municipal Oltenița, commonly known as CSM Oltenița or simply Oltenița (Romanian pronunciation: [olˈtenit̠sa]), is a Romanian football team based in Oltenița, Călărași County. The team currently competes in Liga IV – Călărași County, the fourth tier of the Romanian football league system.

Founded in 1948 under the name Metalul Oltenița, the team became a regular presence in the second and third divisions of Romanian football between 1965 and 2022 as Șantierul Naval Oltenița. After a period marked by financial instability and declining results, it was dissolved and declared bankrupt in 2005. Football returned to the city in 2012, when the team was re-established under the name of the multi-sport club CSM Oltenița.

== History ==
=== Rise and Peak Years (1948–1992) ===
Football activity in Oltenița dates back to at least 1936, when a local team named Venus–Paza Dunării was active in friendly and regional matches. Formed by amateur players such as Vasile Hociotă, Gică Moise, Iancu Vardianu, Mielu Trifan, Emil Marcovschi and Jean Ionescu, the team played regularly and attracted public interest, marking an early phase in the development of organized football in the city.

Following the development of the Oltenița Shipyard, the football team was officially established in 1948 under the name Metalul Oltenița, representing the shipyard’s workers. In its early years, the team competed in the Bucharest district and regional championships, becoming a regular presence in local football competitions.

After several seasons finishing near the top of the standings, the team was renamed Energia Oltenița in 1956 and Șantierul Naval Oltenița in 1958. The Shipbuilders won the Bucharest Regional Championship in the 1964–65 season and earned promotion to Divizia C after defeating Oltul Râmnicu Vâlcea, the Argeș Regional Championship winners, in the promotion play-off.

In Divizia C, coached by Vasile Copil, Oltenițenii competed in the South Series, finishing 6th in the 1965–66 season, 8th in 1966–67, and 5th in 1967–68 season. Following a restructuring of the third tier, they were transferred to Series III, placing 3rd in 1968–69 before winning the series the following season. Promotion to Divizia B was secured after finishing 1st in the promotion play-off held in Brașov, ahead of CFR Pașcani, Metalul Plopeni and Autobuzul București. The promotion-winning squad featured players such as Grădișteanu, Șerban Ion, Dima, Chivu, Vasilescu, Cîmpeanu, Stamanichi, Eftimescu, A. Constantin, Enculescu, Pătracă, Meluță, Gh. Niță, Lungu and Mănilă.

The team spent the next seven seasons in Divizia B. Initially part of Series I, Oltenița ranked 11th in 1970–71 with Constantin Popescu and later Gheorghe Staicu at the helm. In the following campaign, with Vasile Copil in charge, the team achieved its best finish in the second tier, placing 3rd. The 1972–73 season ended with a 6th-place finish under the guidance of Ion Merlan.

After another structural change in the league, the team was moved to Series II. In 1973–74, Merlan led Oltenița to a 13th-place finish and a notable Cupa României run, reaching the Round of 16 after eliminating Dinamo București 1–0 at Municipal Stadium in Giurgiu, before being knocked out by SC Tulcea, 0–3.The squad included Grădișteanu, Florea, Baltag, Păunescu, Ratcu, Mușat, Viciu, Dima, Fildiroiu, Enculescu, Meluță, Buburuz, Răducanu, and Stamanichi.

The following season, the team placed 9th under Iuliu Uțu, and 13th again in 1975–76 with N. Ceavdaridis in charge. In 1976–77, coached by Ștefan Vasile, the team finished 17th, which led to relegation back to Divizia C.

Despite this setback, Oltenița earned immediate promotion by winning Series V in the 1977–78 season under Gheorghe Făiniță. The squad included Grădișteanu, Stamate, Iordache, Vînătoru, Lungu, Nica, Petrescu, Răducanu, Ratcu, Oprea, Florea, Mînaru, Dumitrache, Duță, Pătracă, Mîndru and Bratu. However, their return to the second division was short-lived. Under the guidance of Radu Jercan, the team finished 17th in Series II of the 1978–79 Divizia B campaign and was relegated once more.

In the following years, the club failed to return to the same level of performance. It maintained a mid-table presence in Divizia C, with finishes such as 6th in 1979–80, 7th in 1980–81, and 5th in 1981–82. The 1982–83 season saw the club come close to promotion again, ending as runners-up in Series IV, tied on points with Unirea Slobozia but missing out due to goal difference. This was followed by less remarkable campaigns, with finishes in the middle or lower half of the standings, including 8th in 1983–84, 9th in 1984–85, 7th in 1985–86, and 5th in both 1986–87 and 1987–88. A decline followed as the team dropped to 13th place in 1988–89, though it managed to recover slightly by finishing 7th in 1989–90 and 6th in 1990–91.

=== Instability and Decline (1992–2005) ===
In the 1991–92 season, despite a 7th-place finish in Series V, the team was relegated due to a structural reform of the competitive system which reduced the number of teams in Divizia C and kept only the top four from each series. However, the Oltenița Shipyard team merged with Unirea Tricolor București, a club distinct from the historical team dissolved in 1958. The Bucharest-based club was relocated to Oltenița and merged with ISCIP Ulmeni and ȘN Oltenița, forming a new entity under the name Unirea Tricolor Oltenița then Navol Unirea Oltenița.

This newly formed team competed in Series II of Divizia C for two seasons, finishing 10th in 1992–93 and 15th the following season. Also, Unirea Tricolor managed to reach the Round of 32 in the 1992–93 Cupa României before losing 0–0 (a.e.t.), 7–8 on penalties, to Petrolul Ploiești. The merger dissolved shortly after. Unirea Tricolor returned to București, retaining its spot in Divizia C, while the Oltenița team was renamed Navol Oltenița, reflecting the new name of the local shipyard, and was enrolled in Divizia D – Călărași County.

Navol Oltenița spent two seasons in the county championship before earning promotion back to Divizia C at the end of the 1995–96 season. The team won Divizia D – Călărași County and defeated Abatorul Slobozia, the Ialomița County winners, in the promotion play-off, winning both legs 2–0 and 3–1. The Shipbuilders competed in Divizia C’s Series II, finishing 13th in the 1996–97 season, 9th in 1997–98, and 17th in 1998–99, relegating back to the fourth division.

Over the next few seasons, Navol competed in the fourth division, aiming for promotion. The team won the Călărași County Championship in the 2000–01 season but lost the promotion play-off against Oil Terminal Constanța, the Constanța County winners, 0–1 after extra time.

In 2004, Navol bought the Divizia C place of newly promoted Venus Independența, another Călărași County-based club. The team, coached by Adrian Cristea, finished 7th in Series III of the 2004–05 season of the third division. However, financial problems, worsened by the privatization and decline of the Oltenița Shipyard, became unsustainable in 2005, when the club was declared bankrupt and ceased operations. After this followed the darkest period in the history of football from Oltenița, a period of seven years in which the club remained just a memory and the stadium has become a ruin.

Chronology of names
Period	Name
1948–1956	Metalul Oltenița
1956–1957	Energia Oltenița
1958–1992	Șantierul Naval Oltenița
1992–1993	Unirea Tricolor Oltenița
1993–1994	Navol Unirea Oltenița
1994–2005	Navol Oltenița
2012–present	CSM Oltenița

=== Rebirth and Modern Era (2012–present) ===
After the stadium was renovated in 2011, the team was re-established in 2012 by the local municipality under the name of the multi-sport club CSM Oltenița. Enrolled in Liga V – Călărași County, the fifth tier of the Romanian football league system and the second level of the Călărași County.

CSM Oltenița earned promotion at the end of the 2012–13 season after winning its series. Following a 6th-place finish under the guidance of Virgil Bogatu in the 2013–14 season of Liga IV – Călărași County, Oltenița, still coached by Bogatu, won the 2014–15 season and promoted to Liga III after FC Chitila, the Ilfov County winners, withdrew from the promotion play-off.

In Liga III, CSM Oltenița competed in Series II. The 2015–16 season began with Virgil Bogatu in charge, but he was succeeded in October 2015 by Daniel Iftodi, who guided the team to a 10th-place finish. In 2016–17, Oltenița ranked 9th under the leadership of Valentin Negru. Negru left midway through the 2017–18 campaign, with Vasile Caciureac stepping in and leading the team to another 10th-place finish.

The 2018–19 season began with Gabriel Radu as head coach, but a poor run of results led to his replacement by Augustin Călin. The change, however, was not enough to reverse the team’s fortunes, and Oltenița finished 14th, resulting in relegation back to the fourth division.

The 2019–20 season was suspended in March 2020 due to the COVID-19 pandemic. At that time, Oltenița was in 3rd place and qualified for the promotion play-off, as Venus Independența, the declared county champion, was ineligible for promotion, and the 2nd-placed Unirea Mânăstirea withdrew from the play-off that was to determine which team would advance. Oltenița competed in Group A of Region 6, finishing in 1st place after defeating Viitorul Domnești 1–0 and CSO Plopeni 4–2 on penalties following a 2–2 draw at the Municipal Stadium in Buzău, thereby securing a return to Liga III. Also, Oltenița won the Călărași County phase of the Romanian Cup, defeating ACS Roseți in the final. The team, led by Răzvan Huzuneanu, included, among others, Manea, Ștefan, Lupașcu, Constantin, Lambă, Crăciun, Ghiță, M. Stoica, Rotaru, D. Radu, Udrea, Gheorghe, Pintea, Alexa, and Porumbel.

== Stadium ==
The team plays its home matches at the Municipal Stadium in Oltenița, which has a capacity of approximately 2,500 spectators. In the past, the stadium could accommodate up to 10,000 people, but the capacity was reduced due to irreparable damage sustained during the period it was abandoned. The stadium was revived in 2011, though its capacity remained limited to 2,500. In 2014, it was purchased by the Municipality of Oltenița from the company that had taken over the assets of the Oltenița Shipyard following its bankruptcy.

On 5 October 2000, Romanian footballer Cătălin Hîldan died during a friendly match between Dinamo București and CSM Oltenița, held at this stadium.

== Honours ==
Liga III

- Winners (2): 1969–70, 1977–78
- Runners-up (1): 1982–83

Liga IV – Călărași County

- Winners (3): 1995–96, 2000–01, 2014–15

Bucharest Regional Championship

- Winners (1): 1964–65

Liga V – Călărași County

- Winners (1): 2012–13

== Former managers ==
- (Romania) Vasile Copil (1965–1970)
- (Romania) Constantin Popescu (1970)
- (Romania) Gheorghe Staicu (1971)
- (Romania) Vasile Copil (1971–1972)
- (Romania) Virgil Bogatu (2014–2015)
- (Romania) Daniel Iftodi (2015–2016)
- (Romania) Valentin Negru (2016–2017)
- (Romania) Vasile Caciureac (2018)
- (Romania) Augustin Călin (2019)
- (Romania) Mirel Condei (2022–2023)
- (Romania) Florian Stancu (2023–2024)
- (Romania) Răzvan Huzuneanu (2024–)

== League and cup history ==
Season	Tier	League	Place	Notes	Cupa României
2025–26	4	Liga IV (CL)	3rd		County phase - F
2024–25	4	Liga IV (CL) (West Series)	4th		County phase - QF
2023–24	4	Liga IV (CL) (Series B)	3rd		County phase - R2
2022–23	4	Liga IV (CL) (Series B)	3rd		County phase - R2
2021–22	3	Liga III (Series III)	10th	Relegated	First round
2020–21	3	Liga III (Series III)	10th	PO winner	First round
2019–20	4	Liga IV (CL)	3rd	Promoted	First round
2018–19	3	Liga III (Series II)	14th	Relegated	Third round
2017–18	3	Liga III (Series II)	10th		Second round
2016–17	3	Liga III (Series II)	9th		Second round
2015–16	3	Liga III (Series II)	10th		
2014–15	4	Liga IV (CL)	1st (C)	Promoted	
2013–14	4	Liga IV (CL)	6th		
2012–13	5	Liga V (CL)	1st (C)	Promoted	
2004–05	3	Divizia C (Series III)	7th	Bankruptcy	
1998–99	3	Divizia C (Series II)	17th	Relegated	
1997–98	3	Divizia C (Series II)	9th		
1996–97	3	Divizia C (Series II)	12th		
1995–96	4	Divizia D (CL)	1st (C)	Promoted	
1994–95	3	Divizia C (Series II)	19th	Relegated	
1993–94	3	Divizia C (Series II)	15th		
1992–93	3	Divizia C (Series II)	10th		Round of 32
1991–92	3	Divizia C (Series VI)	7th		
1990–91	3	Divizia C (Series IV)	6th		
1989–90	3	Divizia C (Series IV)	7th		
