= 1964–65 Regional Championship =

23rd season of the Liga IV, the fourth tier of the Romanian football league

Liga IV
- Season: 1964–65

The 1964–65 Regional Championship was the 23rd season of the Liga IV, the fourth tier of the Romanian football league system. The champions of Regional Championships play against each other in the playoffs to earn promotion to Divizia C.

== Regional championships ==
- Argeș (AG)
- Bacău (BC)
- Banat (BA)
- Brașov (BV)
- Bucharest Municipality (B)
- Bucharest Region (B)
- Cluj (CJ)
- Crișana (CR)
- Dobrogea (DO)
- Galați (GL)
- Hunedoara (HD)
- Iași (IS)
- Maramureș (MM)
- Mureș (MS)
- Oltenia (OT)
- Ploiești (PL)
- Suceava (SV)

== Promotion play-off ==
Preliminary round

The matches were played on 27 June and 4 and 7 July 1965.

Team 1	Series	Team 2	Game 1	Game 2	Game 3
CIL Gherla (CJ)	6–4	(B) Laromet București	3–1	1–3	2–0 (Note: The match was played on neutral ground at Câmpina.)

Play-off round

The matches were played on 4, 11 and 18 July 1965.

Team 1	Series	Team 2	Game 1	Game 2	Game 3
Minerul Comănești (BC)	2–4	(SV) Minobrad Vatra Dornei	2–0	0–4	
Rafinăria Câmpina (PL)	1–6	(DO) IMU Medgidia	1–3	0–3	
Ancora Galați (GL)	2–3	(IS) Unirea Negrești	2–0	0–2 (Note: The match was played on 8 August 1965. The initial result of Unirea Negrești–Ancora Galați match 0–1 and the result of replayed match 1–2, were annulled following some appeals.)	0–1 (Note: The match was played on neutral ground at Dinamo Stadium in București on 15 August 1965.)
CFR Caransebeș (BA)	2–0	(CR) Victoria Chișineu-Criș	2–0	0–0	
Șantierul Naval Oltenița (B)	2–1	(AG) Oltul CIL Râmnicu Vâlcea	1–0	1–1	
Unio Satu Mare (MM)	2–4	(MS) Progresul Reghin	2–2	0–2	
Știința Petroșani (HD)	2–3	(OT) Progresul Strehaia	2–0	0–3	
CIL Gherla (CJ)	2–3	(BV) Metalul Copșa Mică	0–2	2–1	

== Championships standings ==
=== Argeș Region ===
Pos	Team	Pld	W	D	L	GF	GA	GD	Pts	Qualification or relegation
1	Oltul Râmnicu Vâlcea (C, Q)	26	18	4	4	63	21	+42	40	Qualification to promotion play-off
2	Constructorul Slatina	26	16	5	5	40	24	+16	37	
3	Forestierul Stâlpeni	26	17	2	7	73	37	+36	36	
4	Unirea Drăgășani	26	15	4	7	48	32	+16	34	
5	Lotru Brezoi	26	14	4	8	43	33	+10	32	
6	Oltul Drăgănești-Olt	26	11	5	10	44	33	+11	27	
7	Recolta Stoicănești	26	10	7	9	42	35	+7	27	
8	Unirea Horezu	26	11	4	11	32	37	−5	26	
9	Progresul Găești	26	10	6	10	34	30	+4	26	
10	Progresul Băiculești	26	9	6	11	40	50	−10	24	
11	Chimia Govora	26	10	3	13	44	49	−5	23	
12	Rapid Piatra-Olt (R)	26	9	4	13	37	45	−8	22	Relegation to Argeș District Championship
13	ASTR Pitești (R)	26	1	3	22	16	73	−57	5	Relegation to Argeș District Championship
14	Hidroenergia Corbeni (R)	26	2	1	23	5	62	−57	5	Relegation to Argeș District Championship

Rules for classification: 1) points; 2) goal difference; 3) number of goals scored.
(C) Champions; (Q) Qualified for the phase indicated; (R) Relegated

=== Bacău Region ===
Pos	Team	Pld	W	D	L	GF	GA	GD	Pts	Qualification or relegation
1	Minerul Comănești (C, Q)	26	18	4	4	67	18	+49	40	Qualification to promotion play-off
2	Victoria Bacău	26	14	7	5	52	26	+26	35	
3	Gloria Zemeș	26	16	2	8	44	29	+15	34	
4	Steaua Roșie Bacău	26	14	3	9	37	34	+3	31	
5	Bradul Roznov	26	14	2	10	37	26	+11	30	
6	Laminorul Roman	26	11	5	10	43	40	+3	27	
7	Viitorul Săvinești	26	9	8	9	33	38	−5	26	
8	Cimentul Bicaz	26	11	3	12	47	38	+9	25	
9	Locomotiva Adjud	26	8	7	11	34	44	−10	23	
10	Oituz Târgu Ocna	26	11	1	14	34	46	−12	23	
11	Petrolistul Dărmănești	26	9	3	14	38	46	−8	21	
12	Cetatea Târgu Neamț	26	7	3	16	31	52	−21	17	
13	Celuloza Piatra Neamț	26	5	7	14	20	46	−26	17	
14	Partizanul Bacău	26	4	7	15	21	55	−34	15	

Rules for classification: 1) points; 2) goal difference; 3) number of goals scored.
(C) Champions; (Q) Qualified for the phase indicated

=== Brașov Region ===
Pos	Team	Pld	W	D	L	GF	GA	GD	Pts	Qualification or relegation
1	Metalul Copșa Mică (C, Q)	26	13	7	6	43	15	+28	33	Qualification to promotion play-off
2	Torpedo Zărnești	26	14	5	7	38	22	+16	33	
3	Celuloza Zărnești	26	13	3	10	42	40	+2	29	
4	Colorom Codlea	26	11	6	9	41	36	+5	28	
5	Textila Cisnădie	26	12	3	11	36	39	−3	27	
6	Progresul Sibiu	26	9	8	9	41	31	+10	26	
7	Textila Mediaș	26	10	6	10	44	40	+4	26	
8	Record Mediaș	26	9	8	9	25	29	−4	26	
9	Vitrometan Mediaș	26	9	7	10	36	30	+6	25	
10	ASA Sibiu	26	8	9	9	35	34	+1	25	
11	Forestierul Târgu Secuiesc	26	11	2	13	35	56	−21	24	
12	Chimia Victoria	26	10	3	13	32	42	−10	23	
13	Măgura Codlea	26	10	2	14	29	43	−14	22	
14	Precizia Săcele	26	5	7	14	23	43	−20	17	

Rules for classification: 1) points; 2) goal difference; 3) number of goals scored.
(C) Champions; (Q) Qualified for the phase indicated

=== Bucharest Municipality ===
Series I

The ranking combined the results of the senior and junior teams.

Pos	Team	Pld	W	D	L	+	W	D	L	GF	GA	GD	Pts	Qualification or relegation
1	Viitorul Electronica București (Q)	52	14	7	5	+	13	9	4	97	52	+45	70	Qualification to championship final
1	Granitul București	52	11	8	7	+	17	4	5	112	57	+55	68	
3	Autobuzul București	52	14	5	7	+	13	5	8	82	46	+36	64	
4	IOR București	52	13	3	10	+	10	6	10	89	77	+12	55	
5	Vulcan București	52	7	7	12	+	14	5	7	78	74	+4	59	
6	Gloria București	52	8	9	9	+	11	5	10	94	72	+22	52	
7	Săgeata București	52	9	10	7	+	9	5	12	60	82	−22	51	
8	TUG București	52	10	7	9	+	7	8	11	71	64	+7	50	
9	ICSIM București	52	12	7	7	+	7	5	14	57	68	−11	50	
10	Electromagnetica București	52	7	10	9	+	10	5	11	77	86	−9	49	
11	Avântul 9 Mai	52	11	6	9	+	7	2	14	65	95	−30	47	
12	Chimia București	52	8	7	11	+	8	7	11	56	83	−27	46	
13	Petrolul București	52	4	6	16	+	12	5	8	69	91	−22	43	
14	Timpuri Noi București	52	3	10	13	+	4	5	17	41	99	−58	29	

Rules for classification: 1) Points; 2) Goal difference; 3) Number of goals scored.
(Q) Qualified for the phase indicated

Series II

The ranking combined the results of the senior and junior teams.

Pos	Team	Pld	W	D	L	+	W	D	L	GF	GA	GD	Pts	Qualification or relegation
1	Laromet București (Q)	52	14	9	3	+	19	3	4	124	38	+86	78	Qualification to championship final
1	Constructorul București	50	17	1	7	+	14	3	8	82	71	+11	66	
3	Abatorul București	51	13	8	5	+	11	4	10	76	56	+20	60	
4	Voința București	52	13	8	5	+	7	7	12	94	67	+27	55	
5	Automatica București	50	12	8	5	+	7	7	11	78	67	+11	53	
6	Bumbacul București	52	7	2	17	+	16	3	7	92	93	−1	51	
7	Spic de Grâu București	52	9	8	9	+	8	9	9	69	75	−6	51	
8	Quadrat București	52	8	5	13	+	10	8	8	84	87	−3	49	
9	Dinamo B București	51	11	4	11	+	9	5	11	96	102	−6	49	
10	Confecția București	52	6	7	13	+	8	12	6	60	74	−14	47	
11	Sirena București	52	6	5	15	+	11	6	9	76	78	−2	45	
12	Banca de Investiții București	52	8	7	11	+	8	5	13	72	97	−25	44	
13	FCME București	52	8	6	12	+	5	4	17	57	105	−48	36	
14	Icar București	52	7	5	14	+	6	4	16	33	63	−30	35	

Rules for classification: 1) Points; 2) Goal difference; 3) Number of goals scored.
(Q) Qualified for the phase indicated

Championship final

The matches were played on 19 and 22 June 1965.

Team 1	Agg.	Team 2	1st leg	2nd leg
Viitorul Electronica București	2–4	Laromet București	0–0	2–4

Laromet București won the Bucharest Municipal Championship and qualify to promotion play-off in Divizia C.

=== Dobrogea Region ===
Pos	Team	Pld	W	D	L	GF	GA	GD	Pts	Qualification or relegation
1	IMU Medgidia (C, Q)	26	19	5	2	85	12	+73	43	Qualification to promotion play-off
2	Cimentul Medgidia	26	16	5	5	56	18	+38	37	
3	Stuful Tulcea	26	14	6	6	43	27	+16	34	
4	Callatis Mangalia	26	11	6	9	40	33	+7	28	
5	Petrolul Constanța	26	10	7	9	32	36	−4	27	
6	Celuloza Constanța	26	11	4	11	35	37	−2	26	
7	Victoria Saligny	26	10	6	10	30	32	−2	26	
8	Ideal Cernavodă	26	9	7	10	35	45	−10	25	
9	USAS Năvodari	26	9	6	11	40	43	−3	24	
10	CFR Constanța	26	9	4	13	45	56	−11	22	
11	Unirea Murfatlar	26	7	8	11	26	38	−12	22	
12	Dinamo Constanța	26	9	3	14	36	39	−3	21	
13	Recolta Negru Vodă	26	6	7	13	18	38	−20	19	
14	Răsăritul Sulina (R)	26	5	0	21	18	84	−66	10	Relegation to Dobrogea District Championship

Rules for classification: 1) Points; 2) Goal difference; 3) Number of goals scored.
(C) Champions; (Q) Qualified for the phase indicated; (R) Relegated

=== Galați Region ===
Pos	Team	Pld	W	D	L	GF	GA	GD	Pts	Qualification or relegation
1	Ancora Galați (C, Q)	26	21	4	1	63	11	+52	46	Qualification to promotion play-off
2	Progresul Brăila	26	19	1	6	63	29	+34	39	
3	Foresta Gugești	26	15	6	5	64	30	+34	36	
4	Dunărea Brăila	26	14	5	7	48	28	+20	33	
5	Constructorul ICMSG Galați	26	10	8	8	52	32	+20	28	
6	Chimica Mărășești	26	10	7	9	61	41	+20	27	
7	Celuloza Brăila	26	11	5	10	30	32	−2	27	
8	Gloria CFR Galați	26	10	6	10	35	30	+5	26	
9	Tractorul Viziru	26	7	7	12	31	38	−7	21	
10	Dinamo Tecuci	25	9	3	13	32	57	−25	21	
11	Avântul Bujor	26	8	4	14	29	56	−27	20	
12	Viitorul Rușețu	25	7	5	13	29	43	−14	19	
13	Luceafărul Focșani (R)	26	4	5	17	22	74	−52	13	Relegation to Galați District Championship
14	Mecanizatorul Făurei (R)	26	2	2	22	8	66	−58	6	Relegation to Galați District Championship

Rules for classification: 1) points; 2) goal difference; 3) number of goals scored.
(C) Champions; (Q) Qualified for the phase indicated; (R) Relegated

=== Hunedoara Region ===
Pos	Team	Pld	W	D	L	GF	GA	GD	Pts	Qualification or relegation
1	Știința Petroșani (C, Q)	26	16	4	6	62	19	+43	36	Qualification to promotion play-off
2	Aurul Brad	26	15	6	5	81	24	+57	36	
3	Textila Sebeș	26	13	4	9	67	45	+22	30	
4	Aurul Zlatna	26	14	1	11	44	44	0	29	
5	Minerul Aninoasa	26	13	2	11	42	32	+10	28	
6	Minerul Ghelari	26	13	2	11	45	46	−1	28	
7	Dacia Orăștie	26	10	8	8	33	35	−2	28	
8	Minerul Vulcan	26	12	3	11	55	44	+11	27	
9	Parângul Lonea	26	10	5	11	37	39	−2	25	
10	Refractara Alba Iulia	26	7	8	11	29	44	−15	22	
11	CFR Simeria	26	8	5	13	30	49	−19	21	
12	Constructorul Hunedoara	26	9	3	14	28	61	−33	21	
13	Unirea Hațeg	26	6	7	13	30	54	−24	19	
14	Preparatorul Petrila	26	5	4	17	26	72	−46	14	

Rules for classification: 1) points; 2) goal difference; 3) number of goals scored.
(C) Champions; (Q) Qualified for the phase indicated

=== Iași Region ===
Pos	Team	Pld	W	D	L	GF	GA	GD	Pts	Qualification or relegation
1	Unirea Negrești (C, Q)	20	17	2	1	66	17	+49	36	Qualification to promotion play-off
2	Siderurgistul Iași	20	14	3	3	55	18	+37	31	
3	Gloria Bârlad	20	13	4	3	40	12	+28	30	
4	Foresta Ciurea	20	13	0	7	41	25	+16	26	
5	Știința IMF Iași	20	9	4	7	36	23	+13	22	
6	Progresul Vaslui	20	6	5	9	29	38	−9	17	
7	Țesătura Iași	20	7	1	12	29	50	−21	15	
8	Victoria Huși (Note: Victoria Huși started the championship as Progresul Huși.)	20	5	5	10	18	40	−22	15	
9	Flacăra Murgeni	20	5	2	13	33	52	−19	12	
10	Victoria Vaslui	20	4	4	12	21	43	−22	12	
11	Gloria Pașcani	20	1	2	17	12	64	−52	4	
12	Recolta Podu Iloaiei (Note: Recolta Podu Iloaiei, Progresul Găgești and Instalatorul Iași were excluded during the season and all their results were canceled.) (D)	0	0	0	0	0	0	0	0	Excluded
13	Progresul Găgești (D)	0	0	0	0	0	0	0	0	Excluded
14	Instalatorul Iași (D)	0	0	0	0	0	0	0	0	Excluded

Rules for classification: 1) points; 2) goal difference; 3) number of goals scored.
(C) Champions; (D) Disqualified; (Q) Qualified for the phase indicated

=== Mureș Region ===
Pos	Team	Pld	W	D	L	GF	GA	GD	Pts	Qualification or relegation
1	Progresul Reghin (C, Q)	26	20	2	4	62	14	+48	42	Qualification to promotion play-off
2	Confecția Odorheiu Secuiesc	26	18	4	4	74	17	+57	40	
3	Străduința Cristuru Secuiesc	26	16	5	5	72	27	+45	37	
4	Ciocanul Târgu Mureș	26	14	6	6	49	29	+20	34	
5	Lemnarul Târgu Mureș	26	11	5	10	38	38	0	27	
6	Apemin Borsec	26	11	4	11	36	42	−6	26	
7	Oțelul Târgu Mureș	26	9	5	12	31	54	−23	23	
8	Știința Târgu Mureș	26	7	8	11	23	35	−12	22	
9	Voința Târnăveni	26	9	4	13	26	50	−24	22	
10	Mureșul Luduș	26	9	3	14	43	57	−14	21	
11	Mureșul Toplița	26	6	8	12	32	58	−26	20	
12	Energia Fântânele	26	8	2	16	48	65	−17	18	
13	Voința Târgu Mureș	26	6	6	14	31	42	−11	18	
14	Gloria Târgu Mureș	26	5	4	17	25	71	−46	14	

Rules for classification: 1) points; 2) goal difference; 3) number of goals scored.
(C) Champions; (Q) Qualified for the phase indicated

=== Ploiești Region ===
Pos	Team	Pld	W	D	L	GF	GA	GD	Pts	Qualification or relegation
1	Rafinăria Câmpina (Q)	26	18	4	4	57	25	+32	40	Qualification to promotion play-off
2	Rapid Plopeni	26	12	7	7	31	27	+4	31	
3	Metalul Buzău	26	12	6	8	43	35	+8	30	
4	Carpați Sinaia	26	11	6	9	57	28	+29	28	
5	Victoria Florești	26	10	7	9	30	30	0	27	
6	Caraimanul Bușteni	26	10	5	11	47	42	+5	25	
7	Bucegi Pucioasa	26	9	7	10	30	33	−3	25	
8	Rafinăria Teleajen	26	9	6	11	33	39	−6	24	
9	Cimentul Fieni	26	9	6	11	30	39	−9	24	
10	Muncitorul Schela Mare	26	10	4	12	38	49	−11	24	
11	Petrolul Berca	26	7	9	10	27	39	−12	23	
12	Progresul Râmnicu Sărat	26	10	3	13	31	49	−18	23	
13	Victoria Moreni	26	8	6	12	34	28	+6	22	
14	Feroemail Ploiești	26	6	6	14	21	46	−25	18	

Rules for classification: 1) points; 2) goal difference; 3) number of goals scored.
(Q) Qualified for the phase indicated

=== Suceava Region ===
Pos	Team	Pld	W	D	L	GF	GA	GD	Pts	Qualification or relegation
1	Minobrad Vatra Dornei (C, Q)	26	17	3	6	62	25	+37	37	Qualification to promotion play-off
2	Feroviarul Câmpulung Moldovenesc	26	12	3	11	38	32	+6	27	
3	Avântul Frasin	26	12	3	11	43	42	+1	27	
4	Foresta Moldovița	26	13	1	12	46	42	+4	27	
5	Foresta Gura Humorului	26	12	3	11	30	43	−13	27	
6	Tractorul Săveni	26	12	3	11	50	55	−5	27	
7	Bradul Vama	26	12	3	11	55	63	−8	27	
8	Forestierul Falcău	26	11	4	11	50	45	+5	26	
9	Volanul Botoșani	26	12	2	12	59	57	+2	26	
10	Unirea Siret	26	9	7	10	36	40	−4	25	
11	Victoria Dorohoi	26	10	4	12	60	48	+12	24	
12	Tractorul Salcea	25	11	2	12	48	48	0	24	
13	CFR Suceava	25	10	4	11	41	44	−3	24	
14	Filatura Fălticeni	26	5	4	17	20	58	−38	14	

Rules for classification: 1) points; 2) goal difference; 3) number of goals scored.
(C) Champions; (Q) Qualified for the phase indicated

== See also ==
- 1964–65 Divizia A
- 1964–65 Divizia B
- 1964–65 Divizia C
- 1964–65 Cupa României
