= La Réole XIII =

French semi-professional rugby league club

Club information
- Full name: La Réole XIII
- Founded: 1938; 88 years ago

Current details
- Ground: Stade Municipal La Reole (2,000)
- Chairman: Bernard Cannon
- Coach: Scott Hurrell
- Competition: National Division 1 (Aquitaine Region)
- 2018/19: 1st

Uniforms
Home colours	Away colours

La Réole XIII are a semi-professional Rugby league club based in La Réole, Gironde in the Aquitaine region in the south of France. They were founded in 1938. From 2016-17 they will play in the National Division 2 Aquitaine Regional Competition. The club plays its home matches at the Stade Municipal La Reole and are currently coached by New Zealander Scott Hurrell

== History ==
La Reole XIII were founded in 1938 and joined the French rugby league as an amateur club. In their first season they were crowned champions of the France 2nd Category which was the 3rd tier, now called the National Division 1. Their next trophy was the National Cup, which later became the Coupe Falcou, which they won in 1954. Another title triumph soon arrived in 1957, this time winning the top competition for amateur clubs the French Amateur Championship. A Coupe Falcou win in 1977 ended their long drought for success and it would be another eleven years before another cup win in 1988. During this time in the league La Reole established themselves as a National League 1 side (2nd Tier). They reached the play-off semi-finals in 79-80 and 84-85 before reaching the final in season 85-86 unfortunately they lost to Roanne XIII 16-19. In the following season they were relegated back to the 3rd tier but after just three years were promoted back to the 2nd tier (National League 1) after beating Saint-Hyppolite in the final 8-6. La Reole reached two play-off semi-finals in 1995 and 1996 but by the start of the millennium they had been relegated again this time they slid all the way down to the 4th tier now called the National Division 2. In 2009-10 they won the league and were promoted, then in the 2013-14 season they won the National Division 1 title and were promoted again. After just two Seasons in the Elite Two Championship they reached and won the final against the league leaders RC Lescure-Arthes XIII 20-18 to lift the title, but after careful consideration the club decided to stay in the second tier. During the close season more woes befell La Reole after a sponsor and backer withdrew from the club. They were forced to start the following season in the 4th tier National Division 2 league.

In 2024, the club established a women's team to compete in the French Development Championship.

== Stadium ==
The club have always played at the Stade Municipal La Reole which is a rugby stadium. It has one main stand which seats 100. The current capacity is 2,000. It is located beside the Garonne river and on several occasions the club have had to postpone matches due to flooding.

== Club honours ==
- Elite Two (1): 2015-16
- National Division 1 (2): 1989-90, 2013–14
- National Division 2 (1): 2009-10
- France Amateur Championship (1): 1956-57
- France Amateur 2nd Category (1): 1938-39
- Coupe Falcou (3): 1954, 1977, 1988
