= Titan Sud =

Railway station in Bucharest, Romania

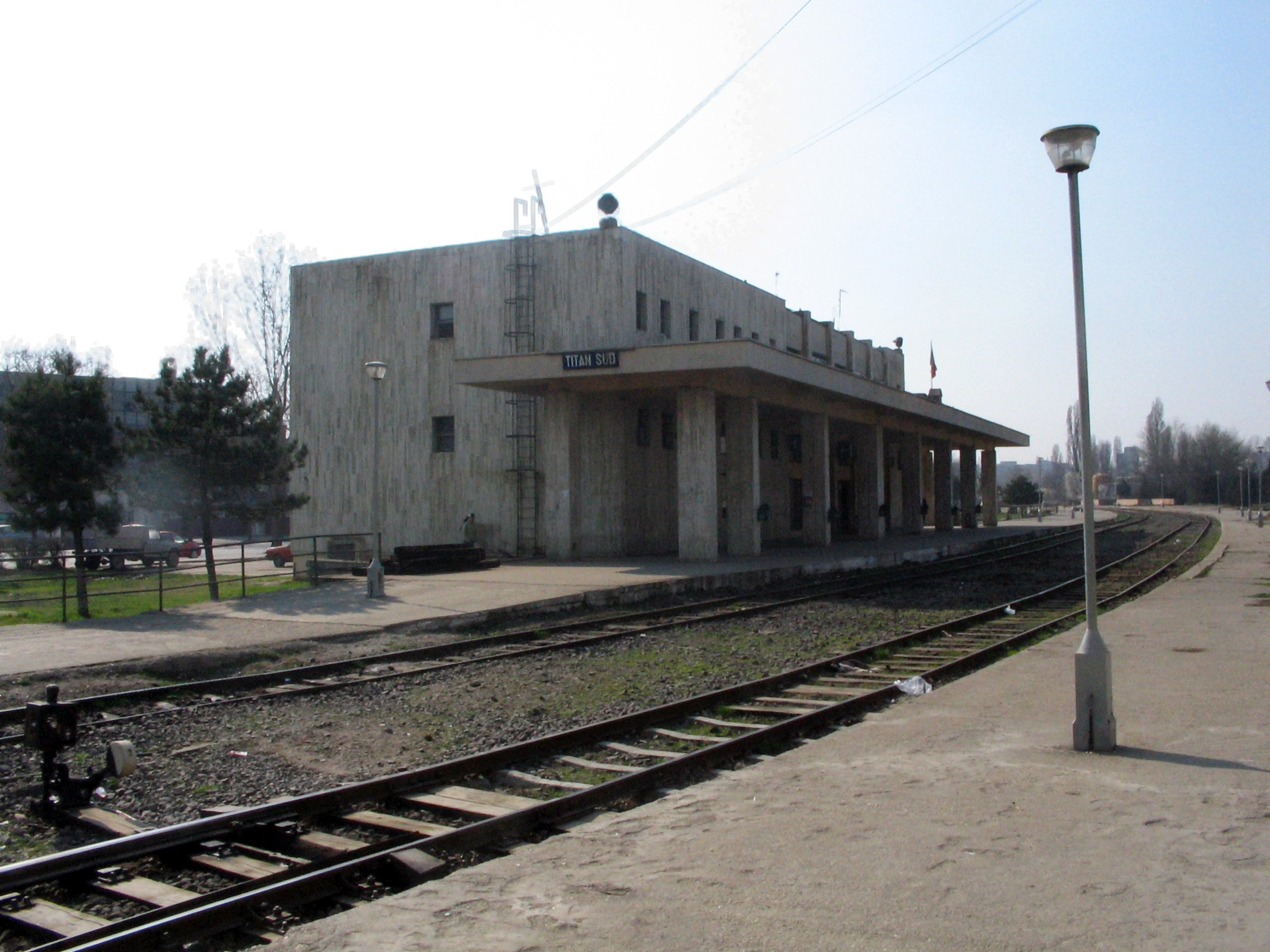
- Titan Sud train station, Bucharest, Romania

General information
- Location: Bucharest; Romania
- Coordinates: 44°26′3.75″N 26°11′4.12″E
- Owner: Compania Națională de Căi Ferate CFR
- Operator: Transferoviar Infrastructura Neinteroperabila
- Line: Titan Sud–Oltenița railway
- Platforms: 2
- Tracks: 2

Other information
- Station code: 81664
- Website: TFC

History
- Opened: 1985
- Original company: Căile Ferate Române
Location

Titan Sud (formerly known as Gara 23 August) is a small train station located in the Eastern side of Bucharest, Romania, near the Republica metro station and the Republica Factory (formerly 23 August Factory).

The railway station was built in 1985, mainly to serve commuters on the Bucharest–Oltenița line. As of 2006, the station serves only four commuter train lines, all of them linking to Oltenița. The station is owned by Căile Ferate Române.
