= Stade Municipal La Reole =

Rugby ground in La Reole, France

- Interactive map of Stade Municipal La Reole
- Location: Avenue du Marechal Joffre, 33190 La Reole, Gironde
- Coordinates: 44.5803°N 0.04637°W
- Owner: Mairie La Reole (La Reole town council)
- Capacity: 2,000 (100 seated)
- Surface: Grass
- Field size: 101.5m x 70m

Tenant
- La Reole XIII

The Stade Municipal La Reole is a rugby ground in La Reole, France. It is currently used by La Reole XIII rugby league club. The ground currently has a capacity of 2,000. Situated on the waterfront the ground has one stand which seats 100 with the rest of the pitch surrounded by a perimeter fence for standing spectators. Due to its location beside the Garonne river the club have had to postpone matches on several occasions due to flooding.
