= RC Daloa =

Ivorian football club

Réveil Club de Daloa
- Full name: Réveil Club de Daloa
- Founded: 1932
- Ground: Stade Municipal; Daloa, Ivory Coast
- Capacity: 4,000
- League: Côte d'Ivoire Premier Division
Home colours

Réveil Club de Daloa (RC Daloa) is an Ivorian football club based in Daloa. As a member of the Ivorian Football Federation Premiere Division, RC Daloa plays at the Stade Municipal.

The club colours are green and yellow. The team won the cup in 1980 and were runners-up in 1960.

== Current squad ==
Note: Flags indicate national team as defined under FIFA eligibility rules; some limited exceptions apply. Players may hold more than one non-FIFA nationality.

No.	Pos.	Nation	Player
—	MF	(Ivory Coast) CIV	Viera Diomande
—	MF	(Ivory Coast) CIV	Bamba Valy Sinaly
—	FW	(Ivory Coast) CIV	Franck Guédégbé

== Achievements ==
- Côte d'Ivoire Cup
  - Winners (1): 1980

== Performance in CAF competitions ==
- CAF Cup Winners' Cup: 1 appearance

1981 – First Round
