= Stade Municipale (Porto-Novo) =

Sports venue in Porto-Novo, Benin

Coordinates: 6.4972°N 2.6050°E

Stade Municipal
- Stade Municipal
- Interactive map of Stade Municipal
- Full name: Stade Municipal
- Location: Porto-Novo, Benin
- Capacity: 20,000

Tenant
- AS Porto Novo

Stade Municipal is a multi-use stadium in Porto-Novo, Benin. It is currently used mostly for football matches and is the home ground of AS Porto Novo of the Benin Premier League. The stadium has a capacity of 20,000 spectators.
