= Stade Municipal (Foumban) =

Stadium in Foumban, Cameroon

Coordinates: 5.7227°N 10.8841°E

Stade Municipal is a multi-use stadium in Foumban, Cameroon. It is currently used mostly for football matches. It serves as a home ground of Fédéral Noun. The stadium holds 5,000 people. Funds were allocated for the rehabilitation of the stadium in preparation for the Africa Cup of Nations in 2020.
