= Stade Municipal (Daloa) =

Coordinates: 6°53′18″N 6°27′24″W

Stade Municipal is a multi-use stadium in Daloa, Côte d'Ivoire. It is currently used mostly for football matches. It serves as a home ground of Réveil Club de Daloa. The stadium holds 4,000 people.
