= Stadionul Municipal (Oltenița) =

Romanian stadium

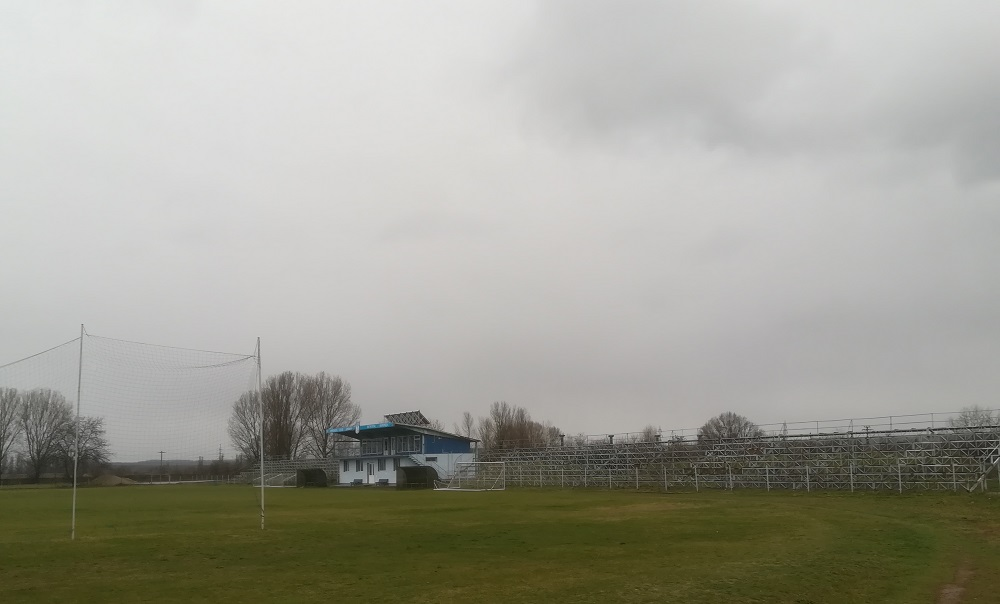
- Interactive map of Stadionul Municipal
- Former names: Stadionul Navol (1994–2014)
- Address: Str. Stadionului
- Location: Oltenița, Romania
- Coordinates: 44°05′21.7″N 26°38′59.3″E
- Owner: Municipality of Oltenița
- Operator: CSM Oltenița
- Capacity: 2,500 (0 seated)
- Surface: Grass

Construction
- Opened: 1940s

Tenant
- CSM Oltenița (1948–present)

Stadionul Municipal is a multi-purpose stadium in Oltenița, Romania. It is currently used mostly for football matches, is the home ground of CSM Oltenița and holds 2,500 people. The stadium had in the past a capacity of 10,000 people, but after the period in which was abandoned much of it was irreparably destroyed. In 2011 the stadium was revived, but the capacity was reduced at only 2,500 and from 2014 was also bought by Municipality of Oltenița from the company that took over the assets of the Oltenița shipyard after its bankruptcy.

Between 1994 and 2014 it was known as Stadionul Navol.

On 5 October 2000 the stadium was the place of a tragedy that shook the Romanian football, Cătălin Hîldan, Dinamo București captain, fell to the ground and died after he suffered a cardiac arrest during the friendly match between Navol Oltenița and Dinamo București.
