= Estadio Municipal =

Estadio Municipal (literally 'municipal stadium') is a generic name for municipally owned, -constructed, or -operated sport stadia in Spanish or Portuguese -speaking countries.

In Angola:

- Estádio Municipal de Benguela, in Benguela

In Argentina:

- Estadio Municipal de Comodoro Rivadavia, in Comodoro Rivadavia
- Estadio Municipal de Arrecifes, in de Arrecifes

In Bolivia:

- Estadio Municipal de El Alto, in El Alto

In Brazil:

- Estádio Municipal Gigante do Norte, in Sinop
- Estádio Municipal Radialista Mário Helênio, in Juiz de Fora

In Chile:

- Estadio Municipal de Calama, in Calama
- Estadio Municipal de Concepción, in Concepción
- Francisco Sánchez Rumoroso Municipal Stadium, in Coquimbo
- Nelson Oyarzún Arenas Municipal Stadium, in Chillán
- La Florida Municipal Stadium, in La Florida, Greater Santiago
- Germán Becker Municipal Stadium, in Temuco

In Colombia:

- Estadio Municipal, in Apartadó
- Estadio Municipal Jorge Torres Rocha, in Facatativá
- Estadio Municipal, in Ipiales
- Estadio Municipal de Montería
- Estadio Municipal Gonzalo Marín, in Riosucio (Caldas)
- Estadio Municipal, in Sahagún
- Estadio Municipal, in Yondó
- Estadio Municipal Los Zipas, in Zipaquirá

In East Timor:

- Estádio Municipal de Díli

In Equatorial Guinea:

- Estadio Municipal (Rebola), in Rebola

In Guatemala:

- Estadio Municipal Amatitlán
- Estadio Municipal Mazatenango
- Estadio Municipal de San Miguel Petapa

In Honduras:

- Estadio Municipal San Pedro Sula

In Panama:

- Estadio Municipal de Veraguas

In Paraguay:

- Estadio Municipal Doctor Julio César Fanego in Mariano Roque Alonso
- Estadio Municipal del Mbeju in Caacupé

In Portugal:

- Estádio Municipal 25 de Abril, in Penafiel
- Estádio Municipal de Águeda
- Estádio Municipal de Aveiro
- Estádio Municipal de Braga
- Estádio Municipal de Chaves
- Estádio Municipal José Bento Pessoa, in Figueira da Foz
- Estádio Municipal de Leiria,
- Estádio Municipal da Marinha Grande
- Estádio Municipal de Nazaré
- Estádio Municipal de Pombal
- Estádio Municipal de Portimão

In Puerto Rico:

- Estadio Municipal Pedro Román Meléndez, in Manatí

In Spain:

- Estadio Municipal de Chapín, in Jerez
- Estadio Municipal de Ipurua, in Eibar
- Estadio Municipal Pozoblanco
- Estadio Municipal Santo Domingo, in El Ejido
- Estadio Municipal Marbella

In Uruguay:

- Estadio Municipal Doctor Mario Sobrero, in Rocha
- Estadio Municipal de Pando, in Canelones

== See also ==
- Municipal Stadium (disambiguation)
- Stade Municipal (disambiguation)
