= Tiraspol Municipal Stadium =

Coordinates: 46°50′53.444″N 29°35′48.501″E

- Stadionul Municipal Tiraspol
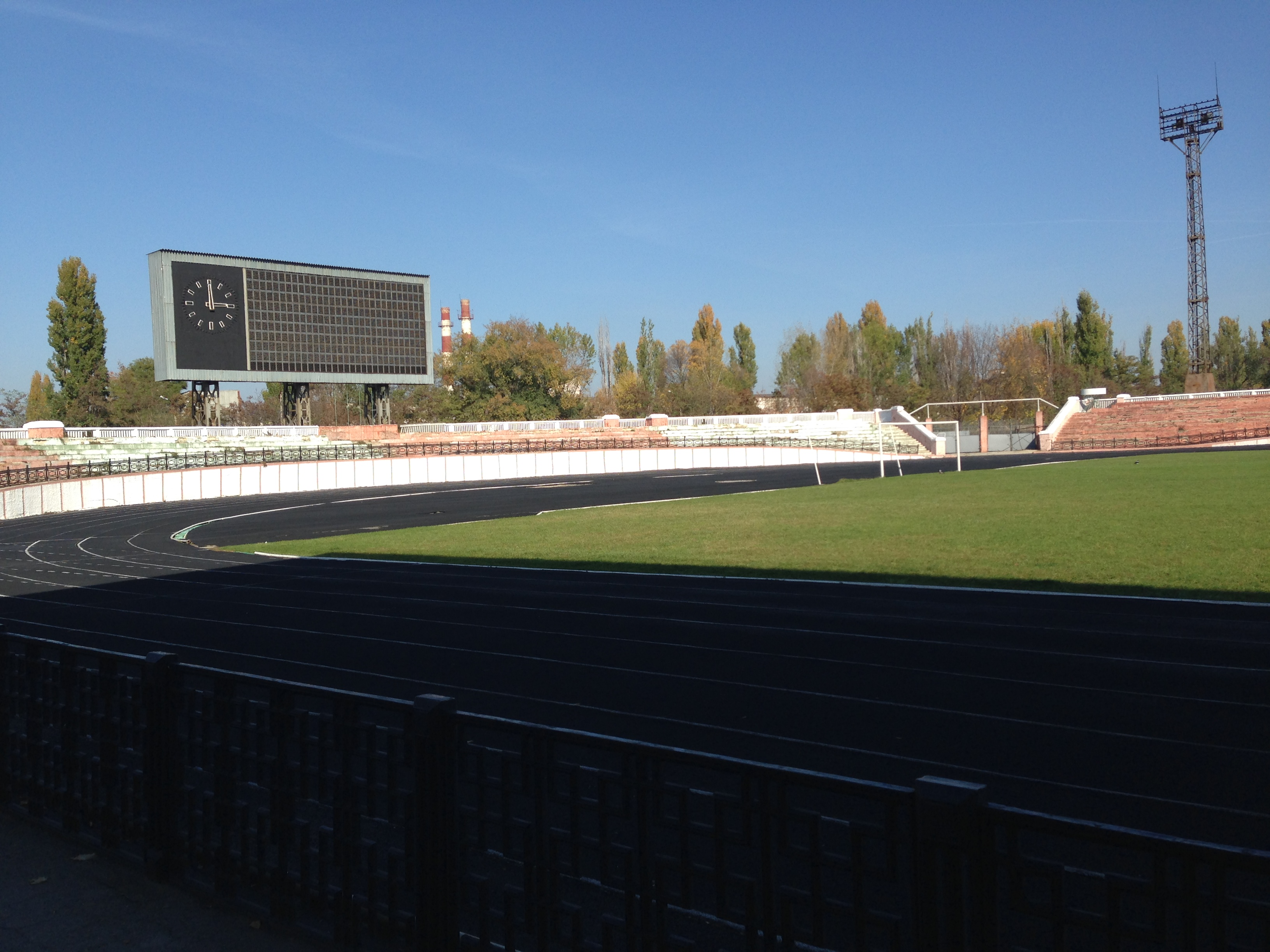
- Interactive map of Tiraspol Municipal Stadium
- Location: Tiraspol
- Capacity: 3,525
- Surface: Grass
- Field size: 100 x 60 m

Tiraspol Municipal Stadium (Romanian: Stadionul Municipal; Russian: Городской стадион, romanized: Gorodskoy stadion), also known as Stadionul Orășenesc; in past named E. Shinkarenko Republican Stadium, is a multi-use stadium in Tiraspol, Moldova. It is currently used mostly for football matches and is the home ground of women football team FC Alga Tiraspol. Previously this stadium was the home ground of CS Tiligul-Tiras Tiraspol, and FC Sheriff Tiraspol (before 2002). The stadium holds 3,525 people.
