= Municipal Stadium =

Municipal Stadium may refer to:

== Europe and Asia ==
- Beirut Municipal Stadium, Lebanon
- Herzliya Municipal Stadium, Israel
- Hiroshima Municipal Stadium (1957), Japan
- Jinnah Stadium, Gujranwala or Municipal Stadium, Pakistan
- Kfarjoz Municipal Stadium, Lebanon
- Municipal Stadium (Telavi), Georgia
- Saida Municipal Stadium, Lebanon
- Sour Municipal Stadium, Lebanon
- Stade Municipal (Kenitra), Morocco
- Stadionul Municipal (Brăila), Romania
- Tripoli Municipal Stadium, Tripoli
- Municipal Stadium (Toruń), Poland

== United States ==
- Cleveland Stadium, commonly known as Municipal Stadium, Ohio
- Grayson Stadium, originally Municipal Stadium, Savannah, Georgia
- Jacksonville Municipal Stadium, now TIAA Bank Field, Florida
- John F. Kennedy Stadium (Philadelphia), formerly Philadelphia Municipal Stadium, Pennsylvania
- MacArthur Stadium, originally Municipal Stadium, Syracuse, New York
- Midway Stadium, two stadiums, the second originally Municipal Stadium, St. Paul, Minnesota
- Municipal Stadium (Waterbury), Connecticut
- Municipal Stadium (Daytona Beach), now Daytona Stadium in Daytona Beach, Florida
- Municipal Stadium (Baltimore), now Memorial Stadium, Maryland
- Municipal Stadium (Hagerstown), Maryland
- Municipal Stadium (Kansas City, Missouri)
- Municipal Stadium (Waco), Waco, Texas
- Phoenix Municipal Stadium, Arizona
- Riverfront Stadium (Waterloo), originally Municipal Stadium, Iowa
- San Jose Municipal Stadium, now Excite Ballpark, California
- Salinas Municipal Stadium, Salinas, California
- Spartan Municipal Stadium, Portsmouth, Ohio

== Other places ==
- Municipal Stadium (Kralendijk), Bonaire
- Municipal Stadium (Sherbrooke), Quebec, Canada

== See also ==
- Estadio Municipal (disambiguation) – municipal stadium in Spanish or Portuguese -speaking countries
- Stade Municipal (disambiguation) – municipal stadium in French-speaking countries
- Stadion Miejski (disambiguation) – municipal stadium in Poland
