= 2025–26 Uganda Premier League =

Football season in Uganda

Uganda Premier League
- Season: 2025–26
- Dates: 26 September 2025 – 23 May 2026
- Champions: Vipers SC; 8th league title
- Relegated: Calvary FC; Buhimba Saints
- Champions League: Vipers SC
- Confederation Cup: Kitara FC (as Uganda Cup winners)
- Matches: 240
- Goals: 502 (2.09 per match)
- Top goalscorer: Ivan Ahimbisibwe; 14 goals
- Biggest home win: SC Villa 6-1 Mbarara City (28 January 2026)
- Biggest away win: Buhimba Saints 0-3 SC Villa (31 October 2025); Express FC 0-3 Vipers SC (26 November 2025); URA FC 0-3 Vipers SC (24 January 2026)
- Highest scoring: URA FC 7-3 Buhimba Saints (26 November 2025)
- Longest winning run: SC Villa; 5 matches
- Longest unbeaten run: Vipers SC; 16 matches
- Longest winless run: Calvary FC; 17 matches
- Longest losing run: Buhimba Saints; 6 matches
- All statistics correct as of 18 February 2026.

The 2025–26 Uganda Premier League (known as the StarTimes Uganda Premier League for sponsorship reasons) was the 58th season of the Uganda Premier League, the top-tier football league in Uganda. The season started on 26 September 2025 and ended on 23 May 2026.

Vipers SC were the defending champions having won the 2024–25 season, (7th title overall) and successfully defended their title, having only lost one match albeit via walkover to Kitara FC, as they were protesting against changes towards the league format.

== Teams ==
The league consists of 16 teams – the top 13 teams from the previous season, and three teams promoted from the FUFA Big League.

=== Changes from previous season ===
Calvary FC, Buhimba Saints and Entebbe UPPC (formerly known as Gaddafi FC) were promoted from the 2024–25 FUFA Big League,replacing Mbale Heroes, Wakiso Giants and Bright Stars the 2024–25 bottom three teams.

==== Rebranding of Gaddafi FC to Entebbe UPPC FC ====
As per club statement, a takeover of newly promoted Gaddafi FC by the Uganda Print and Publishing Corporation (UPPC) was approved by local football governing body, FUFA. As a result, the club was renamed to Entebbe UPPC FC.

=== Promotion and relegation ===
▲ Promoted from 2024–25 FUFA Big League	▼ Relegated to 2025–26 FUFA Big League
Buhimba Saints; Calvary; Entebbe UPPC	Mbale Heroes; Wakiso Giants; Bright Stars

=== Stadiums and locations ===
Locations of the 2025–26 Uganda Premier League clubs

Club	Settlement	Stadium	Capacity
Calvary	Yumbe	Midigo P/S Stadium	1,000
Bul FC	Jinja	Kakindu Municipal Stadium	1,000
Express	Kampala	Nakivubo Stadium	15,000
KCCA FC	Kampala	Lugogo Stadium	3,000
Kitara	Hoima	Hoima City Stadium	20,000
Lugazi	Lugazi	Lugazi FC Stadium	1,000
Maroons FC	Kampala	Luzira Prisons Stadium	1,000
Mbarara City FC	Mbarara	Kakyeka Stadium	2,000
Buhimba Saints	Kagadi	The Royal Park Stadium	
National Enterprises Corporation	Bugolobi	MTN Omondi Stadium	
Police FC	Jinja	Kavumba Recreation Centre	1,000
Uganda People's Defence Force	Bombo	Bombo Stadium	1,000
Uganda Revenue Authority SC	Kampala	Lugazi Stadium	2,000
SC Villa	Kampala	FUFA Kadiba Stadium	20,000
Vipers SC	Wakiso	St. Mary's Stadium-Kitende	15,000
Entebbe UPPC	Entebbe	Buggonga Fisheries Ground	

== League table ==
Pos	Team	Pld	W	D	L	GF	GA	GD	Pts	Qualification or relegation
1	Vipers (C)	30	19	10	1	55	17	+38	67	Qualification for Champions League
2	KCCA	30	19	5	6	46	22	+24	62	
3	SC Villa	30	18	7	5	47	17	+30	61	
4	Kitara	30	16	8	6	43	22	+21	56	Qualification for Confederations Cup
5	NEC	30	14	11	5	32	22	+10	53	
6	Entebbe UPPC	30	14	9	7	30	20	+10	51	
7	Police	30	13	8	9	42	35	+7	47	
8	Maroons	30	9	11	10	26	27	−1	38	
9	Bidco Bul	30	9	10	11	30	33	−3	37	
10	Express	30	9	10	11	28	31	−3	37	
11	URA	30	5	16	9	27	30	−3	31	
12	Mbarara City	30	6	8	16	26	47	−21	26	
13	Lugazi	30	5	10	15	19	36	−17	25	
14	UPDF	30	5	7	18	24	41	−17	22	
15	Calvary (R)	30	4	9	17	14	39	−25	21	Relegation to FUFA Big League
16	Buhimba Saints (R)	30	4	3	23	16	66	−50	15	Relegation to FUFA Big League

Updated to match(es) played on unknown. Source: Uganda Premier League, Soccerway, flashscore
Rules for classification: 1) points; 2) goal difference; 3) goals scored; 4) head-to-head points; 5) head-to-head goal difference; 6) head-to-head goals scored; 7) playoff
(C) Champions; (R) Relegated

== Results ==
Each team plays each other twice (30 matches each), once at home and once away.

Home \ Away	BUL	BUH	CAL	ENT	EXP	KCC	KIT	LUG	MAR	MBA	NEC	POL	UPD	URA	SCV	VIP
Bul	—	3–0	5–1	0–2	0–0		1–1	0–0	1–0	0–0		1–3		0–3	2–1	1–1
Buhimba Saints	0–1	—	2–0		0–2	0–2	1–0		1–0	1–2	0–1	1–1	2–2	0–3	0–3	
Calvary	0–1	2–0	—	2–4	0–0		0–1		0–1	1–1	2–0	1–0	0–1	0–0	0–3 {w/o)	0–0
Entebbe UPPC	4–0	0–1		—	2–0		1–0	2–1	0–0	1–0	1–0	0–2	2–0	0–0		0–1
Express		3–1	4–0	0–0	—	0–1	3–2	0–0	1–1	4–1		3–1	1–0	3–1	0–1	0–3
KCCA	2–1	1–0	4–2	0–1	3–0	—		0–0	3–0	4–1	2–1	2–1	4–0	2–1	2–1	
Kitara	1–0			2–0	1–0	1–1	—	4–0	2–0	4–0	0–1	2–2	2–1	1–1		
Lugazi	2–1	5–2	3–1	1–1	0–0			—	0–1	0–1	0–2	1–1	1–0	0–0		1–2
Maroons	1–0	1–0	0–0	0–0	4–0	0–0	0–1	3–0	—	1–1	1–1		0–0	0–0	1–0	0–3
Mbarara City	1–1	2–0	1–0	1–1		1–2	0–1	0–0		—	0–1		0–1	1–0	1–3	1–2
NEC	1–1	3–0	1–0	0–0	0–0	3–1	3–3	1–0			—	2–2	1–0	1–0	1–4	1–1
Police	0–2	4–0	2–0	1–1	2–1	2–0	1–2	2–1	2–1	1–1	0–1	—			1–0	0–0
UPDF	0–1	0–0	0–0	0–1		1–2	1–1	2–0	1–2	3–1	0–0	1–2	—		0–1	1–2
URA		7–3	1–1	0–1	1–1	0–0	0–1	1–0	2–0		1–1	0–0	3–2	—	0–0	0–3
Villa	0–0		1–0	1–1	0–0	1–0	1–0	0–0	2–0	6–1		2–1	4–1	3–0	—	
Vipers	3–1	4–0	1–0		2–0	1–0	0–0	3–0	2–1	2–0	1–1	4–1	5–1	1–1`	1–1	—

Updated to match(es) played on 18 February 2026. Source: Sofascore, Uganda Premier League
Legend: Blue = home team win; Yellow = draw; Red = away team win.

=== Results by round ===
Postponed matches are added to the round they were originally scheduled and not the round they were played in.

Team ╲ Round	1	2	3	4	5	6	7	8	9	10	11	12	13	14	15	16	17	18	19	20	21	22
Buhimba Saints	W	W	W	L	L	L	L	L	L	D	L	W	L	L	L	D	D					L
Bul	D	W	D	W	D	D	L	L	L	L	L	W	W	L	W	D	L					L
Calvary	L	L	D	D	L	L	L	L	L	D	L	L	L	D	L	L	D					W
Entebbe UPPC	L	W	D	W	L	W	L	W	D	W	W	W	W	D	W	D	W					D
Express	W	L	D	L	D	W	D	L	W	L	L	L	W	L	D	D	D					W
KCCA	D	W	D	W	W	L	W	W	W	W	W	L	D	W	L	L	W					L
Kitara	D	W	L	W	W	L	W	W	W	W	L	W	D	W	W	W	D					D
Lugazi	W	L	D	D	L	W	D	L	L	D	L	L	D	W	D	L	W					D
Maroons	D	L	W	D	L	D	L	D	W	L	W	L	D	D	D	L	L					W
Mbarara City	D	L	D	L	L	L	W	L	D	D	W	L	D	L	D	W	L					L
NEC	D	D	D	L	W	D	L	D	D	L	D	W	D	W	D	W	D					W
Police	D	W	D	L	W	W	W	L	W	D	W	W	W	L	D	W	D					L
UPDF	L	W	L	L	L	L	W	L	W	D	D	L	L	L	L	D	L					W
URA	D	D	D	D	W	D	L	W	L	L	L	L	L	D	D	D	D					L
Villa	D	L	D	W	W	W	W	W	L	W	W	W	L	W	D	D	W					W
Vipers	D	L	D	W	W	W	W	W	D	W	W	W	W	W	W	D	D					D

Updated to match(es) played on 19 February 2026. Source: Sofascore
W = Win; D = Draw; L = Loss

== Controversy ==
=== Proposed changes to league format ===
In July 2025, FUFA met with clubs for a review of the previous campaign. In that same meeting, the FUFA Executive Committee informed clubs of plans to introduce a new league format. This new format will consist of the same number of teams (16) but instead of all the teams playing each other home and away until the end of the season, the games would be split into three rounds. On the 20 August, FUFA, through the CEO Edgar Watson, sent a circular to the clubs, explaining changes not only to the new format but other areas such as data, prize money and player registration.

In the first round, all the clubs would play a single-leg round-robin format in 15 games, with a draw to determine who plays home and who plays away. After this round, the teams were to be further divided into two groups depending on the rankings, with Group 1 consisting of the top eight and Group 2 of the bottom eight.

In the second round, all the teams in both groups would play against each other, home and away. However, the top six in Group 1 were to advance to the third round and placed in Group 3 while the bottom two would have ended their campaign in positions, seventh and eighth. In Group 2, the top two were to ended their season in positions, ninth and tenth, while the bottom six were to play in the third round and placed in Group 4.

In the third round, all the teams were to play in a single-leg round-robin format like in the first round, but with fixtures being reversed, with the intention to ensure parity. Teams in Group 3 would fight for the title and the final rankings of this group would have determined who finishes in the top 6 in the overall rankings. In Group B, the top three would remain in the division, finishing the campaigns 11th to 13th, while the fourth-placed team would face the runner-up of the FUFA Big League in a two-legged promotion/relegation play-off. The bottom-two would get relegated directly to the FUFA Big League.

These changes sparked widespread criticism and backlash from the clubs along with fans, with the majority of them opting not to go the stadia in opposition of the reforms. While 15 of the 16 clubs eventually opted to play, defending champions Vipers SC, remained defiant against the changes, as they no-showed their first match against Kitara FC. Vipers club president and former FUFA president, Lawrence Mulindwa, insisted in a statement, that they would not play under the new structure until their concerns were addressed.

On 18 October, FUFA announced that they would revert to the old league format for the season, after a meeting with the Uganda Premier League secretariat and clubs. FUFA president, Moses Magogo, further revealed that they would make discussions of the new format at the end of the season.

== Season statistics ==
=== Top scorers ===
Rank	Player	Club	Goals
1	(Uganda) Ivan Ahimbisibwe	KCCA FC	14
2	(Uganda) Ambrose Kigozi	Entebbe UPPC	12
2	(Uganda) Abdul Karim Watambala	Vipers SC	12
4	(Uganda) Patrick Kaddu	Kitara FC	10
4	(Uganda) Arafat Kiza Usama	Vipers SC	10
6	(Uganda) Clinton Kamugisha	Mbarara City FC	9
6	(Uganda) Frank Ssebuufu	SC Villa	9
8	(Democratic Republic of the Congo) Bedia Djuma Ikamba	Police FC	8
8	(Uganda) Lawrence Olaboro	Calvary FC	8
8	(Uganda) Abdul Karim Ndugwa	BUL FC	8

=== Assists ===
Rank	Player	Club	Assists
1	(Uganda) Reagan Kalwoya	BUL FC	6
1	(Uganda) Najib Yiga	SC Villa	6
3	(Uganda) Herbert Achayi	KCCA FC	5
3	(Uganda) Dennis Kalanzi	Police FC	5
3	(Uganda) Saidi Mayanja	KCCA FC	5
3	(Nigeria) Chukwuma Odili	Vipers SC	5
3	(Uganda) Frank Ssebuufu	SC Villa	5
3	(Uganda) Arafat Kiza Usama	Vipers SC	5
9	9 players		4

=== Disciplinary record ===
==== Player ====
- Most yellow cards: 7
  - (Uganda) John Rogers (Calvary FC)
