= 2012–13 Uganda Super League =

Football season in Uganda

Uganda Super League
- Season: 2012–13
- Champions: Kampala City Council FC
- Top goalscorer: Herman Wasswa, SC Villa and Kampala City Council FC (20)

The 2012–13 Ugandan Super League was the 46th season of the official Ugandan football championship, the top-level football league of Uganda.

== Overview ==
For an eight-month period in the 2012–13 season, Uganda had two parallel leagues structures, the Federation of Uganda Football Associations (FUFA) Super League, run by the national Federation, and the Uganda Super League which was managed by the Uganda Super League Limited (USLL).

Uganda's cabinet chaired by the Prime Minister Patrick Amama Mbabazi on 8 May 2013 declared that only one league would exist for the 2013/14 season.

== FUFA Super League ==
The 2012–13 FUFA Super League was contested by 16 teams and was won by Kampala City Council FC, while Victors FC, Aurum Roses and Water FC were relegated.

=== Participants and locations ===
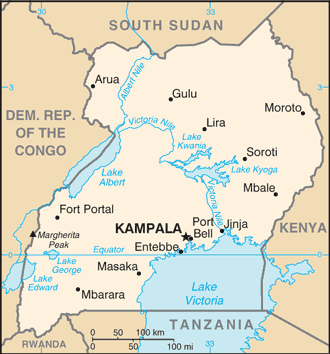
Uganda.

Club	Settlement	Stadium	Capacity
Aurum Roses	Kampala	Kavumba Recreation Centre	1,000
Bul FC	Jinja	Kakindu Municipal Stadium	1,000
Entebbe FC	Entebbe	Muteesa II Stadium	20,200
Express FC	Kampala	Muteesa II Stadium	20,200
Kampala City Council FC	Kampala	Lugogo Stadium	3,000
Kiira Young	Kampala	Luzira Prisons Stadium	1,000
Masaka Local Council FC	Masaka	Masaka Recreation Ground	1,000
Police FC	Jinja	Kavumba Recreation Centre	1,000
Proline FC	Buikwe	Nakivubo Stadium	15,000
Simba FC	Bombo	Bombo Stadium	1,000
Uganda Revenue Authority SC	Kampala	Lugazi Stadium	2,000
SC Victoria University	Kampala	Mandela National Stadium	45,200
SC Villa	Kampala	Nakivubo Stadium	15,000
Victors FC	Kampala	Kakindu Municipal Stadium	1,000
Vipers SC	Buikwe	Buikwe Stadium	2,000
Water FC	Kampala	Luzira Prisons Stadium	1,000

Some of the Kampala clubs may on occasions also play home matches at the Mandela National Stadium.

=== League standings ===
Pos	Team	Pld	W	D	L	GF	GA	GD	Pts	Qualification or relegation
1	Kampala City Council FC (C)	30	17	12	1	50	16	+34	63	Champions
2	Uganda Revenue Authority SC	30	17	5	8	49	22	+27	56	
3	Vipers SC	30	14	9	7	36	22	+14	51	
4	SC Villa	30	13	8	9	36	31	+5	47	
5	SC Victoria University	30	11	13	6	27	20	+7	46	
6	Entebbe FC	30	12	10	8	25	19	+6	46	
7	Bul FC	30	10	13	7	29	28	+1	43	
8	Kiira Young	30	9	14	7	27	24	+3	41	
9	Masaka Local Council FC	30	10	11	9	28	28	0	41	
10	Proline FC	30	9	11	10	32	37	−5	38	
11	Express FC	30	8	12	10	31	31	0	36	
12	Police FC	30	8	11	11	27	32	−5	35	
13	Simba FC	30	9	8	13	19	30	−11	35	
14	Victors FC (R)	30	5	14	11	17	30	−13	29	Relegated
15	Aurum Roses (R)	30	5	6	19	20	49	−29	21	Relegated
16	Water FC (R)	30	2	5	23	16	50	−34	11	Relegated

(C) Champions; (R) Relegated

=== Leading goalscorer ===
The top goalscorer in the 2012–13 season was Herman Wasswa of SC Villa and Kampala City Council FC with 20 goals.

== Uganda Super League Limited ==
The 2012–13 Ugandan Super League Ltd (USLL) was contested by 11 teams and was won by Maroons FC.

=== League standings ===
Pos	Team	Pld	W	D	L	GF	GA	GD	Pts	Qualification
1	Maroons FC (C)	20	14	5	1	37	13	+24	47	Champions
2	SC Villa	20	12	6	2	41	22	+19	42	
3	Express FC	20	13	1	6	45	19	+26	40	
4	Entebbe Young FC	20	10	3	7	28	30	−2	33	
5	Masaka Local Council FC	20	10	1	9	26	24	+2	31	
6	Water FC	20	8	6	6	37	18	+19	30	
7	Simba FC	20	8	6	6	27	23	+4	30	
8	Police FC	20	5	3	12	18	27	−9	18	
9	Bunamwaya SC	20	3	6	11	18	32	−14	15	
10	Victors FC	20	3	4	13	17	50	−33	13	
11	Kiira Young	20	1	5	14	14	50	−36	8	

(C) Champions
