= 2006 Uganda Super League =

Football season in Uganda

Uganda Super League
- Season: 2006
- Champions: Uganda Revenue Authority SC
- Top goalscorer: Dan Walusimbi, Police FC (15)

The 2006 Ugandan Super League was the 39th season of the official Ugandan football championship, the top-level football league of Uganda.

== Overview ==
The 2006 Uganda Super League was contested by 15 teams and was won by Uganda Revenue Authority SC, while Kampala United, KB Lions and Super Cubs were relegated.

== League standings ==
Pos	Team	Pld	W	D	L	GF	GA	GD	Pts	Qualification or relegation
1	Uganda Revenue Authority SC (C)	28	19	8	1	47	13	+34	65	Champions
2	Police FC	28	16	7	5	42	13	+29	55	
3	Express FC	28	15	9	4	32	16	+16	54	
4	Kampala City Council FC	28	15	8	5	34	17	+17	53	
5	SC Villa	28	13	10	5	39	19	+20	49	
6	Victors FC	28	14	7	7	28	20	+8	49	
7	Simba FC	28	12	11	5	36	21	+15	47	
8	Kinyara Sugar Works FC	28	7	13	8	26	26	0	34	
9	Mbale Heroes	28	8	8	12	18	25	−7	32	
10	Maji FC	28	7	9	12	23	27	−4	30	
11	Bunamwaya SC	28	7	8	13	26	35	−9	29	
12	Masaka Local Council FC	28	6	9	13	20	31	−11	27	
13	Kampala United (R)	28	5	10	13	22	31	−9	25	Relegated
14	KB Lions (R)	28	2	5	21	14	68	−54	11	Relegated
15	Super Cubs (R)	28	0	6	22	10	55	−45	6	Relegated

(C) Champions; (R) Relegated

== Leading goalscorer ==
The top goalscorer in the 2006 season was Dan Walusimbi of Police FC with 15 goals.
