= 1969 Uganda National First Division League =

Football season in Uganda

Uganda National First Division League
- Season: 1969
- Country: Uganda
- Champions: Prisons
- Top goalscorer: Ali Kitonsa, Express FC (36)

The 1969 Uganda National First Division League was the second season of the Ugandan football championship, the top-level football league of Uganda.

== Overview ==
The 1969 Uganda National First Division League was contested by 10 teams and was won by Prisons.

== League standings ==
Pos	Team	Pld	W	D	L	GF	GA	GD	Pts	Qualification
1	Prisons FC (C)	18	13	3	2	56	15	+41	29	Champions
2	Express FC	18	12	2	4	64	24	+40	26	
3	Jinja	18	11	3	4	42	37	+5	25	
4	Simba FC	18	10	4	4	43	17	+26	24	
5	Uganda Police FC	18	10	4	4	43	29	+14	24	
6	Coffee Kakira	18	8	3	7	42	31	+11	19	
7	Kilembe Mines FC	18	5	2	11	34	61	−27	12	
8	Soroti	18	4	4	10	31	60	−29	12	
9	Masaka	18	3	2	13	20	68	−48	6 (Note: 2 points deducted?)	
10	Mbale	18	2	1	15	31	82	−51	5	

(C) Champions

== Leading goalscorer ==
The top goalscorer in the 1969 season was Ali Kitonsa of Express FC with 36 goals.
