= 2024–25 Uganda Premier League =

Football season in Uganda

Uganda Premier League
- Season: 2024–25
- Dates: 13 September 2024 – 24 May 2025
- Champions: Vipers SC
- Relegated: Bright Stars; Wakiso Giants; Mbale Heroes
- Champions League: Vipers SC
- Confederation Cup: NEC
- Matches: 240
- Goals: 515 (2.15 per match)
- Top goalscorer: Allan Okello (19 goals)
- Biggest home win: Kitara FC 7-0 Express FC (21 December 2024)
- Biggest away win: Mbale Heroes 1-6 Kitara FC (24 May 2025)
- Highest scoring: SC Villa 6-1 Wakiso Giants (23 November 2024); Kitara FC 7-0 Express FC (21 December 2024); Mbale Heroes 1-6 Kitara FC (24 May 2025)
- Longest unbeaten run: KCCA; Police (4 matches)

The 2024–25 Uganda Premier League was the 57th season of the Uganda Premier League, the top-tier football league in Uganda. The season started on 13 September 2024 and ended on 24 May 2025.

SC Villa are the defending champions after winning the 2023–24 season, a record 17th title overall and their first title in 20 years.

== Teams ==
The league consists of 16 teams – the top 13 teams from the previous season, and three teams promoted from the FUFA Big League.

=== Changes from previous season ===
==== Promotion and relegation ====
Police, Mbale Heroes, and Lugazi were promoted from the 2023–24 FUFA Big League, replacing the 2023–24 Uganda Premier League bottom three teams, Busoga United, Gadafi, and Arua Hill. Arua Hill's license was suspended by FUFA after the first half of fixtures for failing to meet licensing requirements, and was the first team to be relegated.

▲ Promoted from 2023–24 FUFA Big League	▼ Relegated to 2024–25 FUFA Big League
Police; Mbale Heroes; Lugazi	Busoga United; Gadafi; Arua Hill

=== Stadiums and locations ===
Locations of the 2024–25 Uganda Premier League clubs

Club	Settlement	Stadium	Capacity
Bright Stars	Kampala	Mwererwe Stadium	5,000
Bul FC	Jinja	Kakindu Municipal Stadium	1,000
Express	Kampala	Nakivubo Stadium	15,000
KCCA FC	Kampala	Lugogo Stadium	3,000
Kitara	Hoima	Masindi Municipal Stadium	
Lugazi	Lugazi	Lugazi FC Stadium	1,000
Maroons FC	Kampala	Luzira Prisons Stadium	1,000
Mbarara City FC	Mbarara	Kakyeka Stadium	2,000
Mbale Heroes			
National Enterprises Corporation	Bugolobi	MTN Omondi Stadium	
Police FC	Jinja	Kavumba Recreation Centre	1,000
Uganda People's Defence Force	Bombo	Bombo Stadium	1,000
Uganda Revenue Authority SC	Kampala	Lugazi Stadium	2,000
SC Villa	Kampala	Mandela National Stadium	38,000
Vipers SC	Wakiso	St. Mary's Stadium-Kitende	15,000
Wakiso Giants	Wakiso	Wakisha Stadium	2,000

== League table ==
Pos	Team	Pld	W	D	L	GF	GA	GD	Pts	Qualification or relegation
1	Vipers (C, Q)	30	21	6	3	49	15	+34	69	Qualification for Champions League
2	NEC	30	20	7	3	44	19	+25	67	Qualification for Confederation Cup
3	Bul	30	16	11	3	37	18	+19	59	
4	URA	30	16	4	10	42	23	+19	52	
5	KCCA	30	14	8	8	47	24	+23	50	
6	Villa	30	12	9	9	44	30	+14	45	
7	Kitara	30	12	8	10	45	20	+25	44	
8	Maroons	30	12	7	11	28	32	−4	43	
9	UPDF	30	10	9	11	28	33	−5	39	
10	Express	30	11	6	13	30	45	−15	39	
11	Police	30	8	12	10	27	28	−1	36	
12	Mbarara City	30	8	8	14	21	31	−10	32	
13	Lugazi	30	7	10	13	19	33	−14	31	
14	Bright Stars (R)	30	4	8	18	23	47	−24	20	Relegation to FUFA Big League
15	Wakiso Giants (R)	30	3	11	16	17	47	−30	20	Relegation to FUFA Big League
16	Mbale Heroes (R)	30	2	4	24	13	69	−56	10	Relegation to FUFA Big League

Source: UPL
Rules for classification: 1) points; 2) goal difference; 3) goals scored; 4) head-to-head points; 5) head-to-head goal difference; 6) head-to-head goals scored; 7) playoff
(C) Champions; (Q) Qualified for the phase indicated; (R) Relegated

== Results ==
Each team played each other twice (30 matches each), once at home and once away.

Home \ Away	BRI	BUL	EXP	KCC	KIT	LUG	MAR	MBH	MBA	NEC	POL	UPD	URA	SCV	VIP	WAK
Bright Stars	—	0–2	0–1	0–1	1–0	1–1	0–1	5–1	0–1	1–5	3–1	2–1	0–1	1–3	1–2	0–0
Bul	1–0	—	1–1	1–1	1–0	4–0	1–0	3–0	0–2	1–1	0–0	0–2	2–1	1–0	1–0	1–1
Express	2–1	0–2	—	0–3	1–0	0–1	0–0	2–1	3–1	2–1	1–2	2–2	1–2	1–0	2–2	4–1
KCCA	5–0	1–2	0–1	—	2–0	5–0	5–0	5–0	1–0	0–1	2–1	0–0	1–0	1–1	0–2	5–0
Kitara	2–0	1–3	7–0	4–0	—	0–0	1–0	6–0	1–1	1–2	0–1	4–0	1–0	1–0	0–2	0–0
Lugazi	3–1	1–2	1–0	1–1	0–3	—	0–1	1–1	1–1	1–0	1–0	2–2	0–1	0–1	0–0	1–0
Maroons	1–1	0–0	1–0	0–0	0–4	1–0	—	1–0	2–0	1–3	1–0	1–1	2–1	1–1	0–1	2–3
Mbale Heroes	1–0	0–0	0–1	0–1	1–1	1–3	0–1	—	0–1	0–1	1–1	0–3	0–4	1–0	0–4	0–1
Mbarara City	0–0	0–0	2–0	3–0 (w/o)	1–1	1–0	0–3	1–0	—	1–2	0–0	0–1	0–2	0–2	1–3	0–0
NEC	1–0	1–1	3–1	1–0	2–1	2–0	2–1	2–0	1–0	—	0–0	1–0	1–0	2–1	3–1	2–0
Police	1–1	0–0	2–2	0–0	0–1	0–0	1–2	2–1	2–0	1–1	—	1–0	2–0	1–3	0–1	2–1
UPDF	1–0	2–3	0–2	1–2	0–0	1–0	2–1	1–1	2–1	0–0	2–2	—	0–0	2–0	0–1	1–0
URA	4–0	0–1	5–0	1–0	2–0	1–0	1–0	3–2	1–1	1–1	1–0	2–1	—	1–1	0–2	3–2
Villa	2–2	2–1	1–0	2–2	0–0	1–1	0–2	3–1	4–2	0–1	1–1	5–0	1–0	—	1–0	6–1
Vipers	1–1	1–1	3–0	1–1	0–0	1–0	1–0	6–0	1–0	3–1	2–1	1–0	2–0	2–1	—	1–0
Wakiso Giants	1–1	1–2	0–0	1–2	0–0	0–0	3–3	1–0	0–1	0–0	0–2	0–1	0–3	1–1	0–2	—

Source: Sofascore
Legend: Blue = home team win; Yellow = draw; Red = away team win.

== Season statistics ==
=== Top scorers ===
Rank	Player	Club	Goals
1	(Uganda) Allan Okello	Vipers SC	19
2	(Uganda) Ivan Ahimbisibwe	URA FC	16
3	(Uganda) Samuel Ssekamatte	UPDF FC	13
4	(Uganda) Samuel Ssenyonjo	Kitara FC	12
5	(Uganda) Charles Lwanga	SC Villa	11
6	(Uganda) Jude Ssemugabi	Kitara FC	10
7	(Uganda) Milton Karisa	Vipers SC	9
7	(Uganda) Paul Mucureezi	NEC FC	9
9	(Uganda) Cromwel Abang	NEC FC	8
9	(Uganda) Patrick Kakande	SC Villa	8
9	(Uganda) Abdul Karim Ndugwa	BUL FC	8

=== Assists ===
Rank	Player	Club	Assists
1	(Uganda) Moses Okabo	URA FC	8
2	(Uganda) Abdul Karim Watambala	Vipers SC	7
2	(Uganda) Arafat Kiza	KCCA FC	7
4	(Uganda) Martin Kavuma	NEC FC	6
4	(Uganda) Jerome Kirya	BUL FC	6
4	(Uganda) Paul Mucureezi	NEC FC	6
7	(Uganda) Living Kabon	Kitara FC	5
7	(Uganda) Patrick Kaddu	Kitara FC	5
7	(Uganda) Milton Karisa	Vipers SC	5
7	(Uganda) Saidi Mayanja	URA FC	5
7	(Uganda) Enock Ssebagala	NEC FC	5
