= 2009–10 Uganda Super League =

Football season in Uganda

Uganda Super League
- Season: 2009–10
- Champions: Bunamwaya SC

The 2009–10 Ugandan Super League was the 43rd season of the official Ugandan football championship, the top-level football league of Uganda.

== Overview ==
The 2009–10 Uganda Super League was contested by 18 teams and was won by Bunamwaya SC, while Boroboro Tigers FC, Maji FC, Iganga Town Council FC, Hoima and Arua Central FC were relegated.

== League standings ==
Pos	Team	Pld	W	D	L	GF	GA	GD	Pts	Qualification or relegation
1	Bunamwaya SC (C)	34	21	11	2	61	22	+39	74	Champions
2	Express FC	34	21	9	4	44	15	+29	72	
3	Uganda Revenue Authority SC	34	20	10	4	53	23	+30	70	
4	Kampala City Council FC	34	14	15	5	41	14	+27	57	
5	Simba FC	34	14	8	12	34	34	0	50	
6	Police FC	34	13	9	12	34	32	+2	48	
7	SC Villa	34	12	15	7	32	27	+5	45 (Note: 6 points deducted.)	
8	Nalubaale FC	34	12	8	14	34	34	0	44	
9	Masaka Local Council FC	34	12	8	14	30	42	−12	44	
10	Fire Masters	34	11	10	13	30	37	−7	43	
11	Kinyara Sugar Works FC	34	10	12	12	32	33	−1	42	
12	Children Restoration Outreach FC	34	10	11	13	32	35	−3	41	
13	Victors FC	34	9	14	11	25	30	−5	41	
14	Boroboro Tigers FC (R)	34	9	13	12	29	40	−11	37 (Note: 3 points deducted.)	Relegated
15	Maji FC (R)	34	8	10	16	33	45	−12	34	Relegated
16	Iganga Town Council FC (R)	34	7	10	17	25	40	−15	31	Relegated
17	Hoima (R)	34	7	3	24	24	53	−29	24	Relegated
18	Arua Central FC (R)	34	5	6	23	20	72	−52	15	Relegated

(C) Champions; (R) Relegated
