= Vincent Kayizzi =

Ugandan footballer (born 1984)

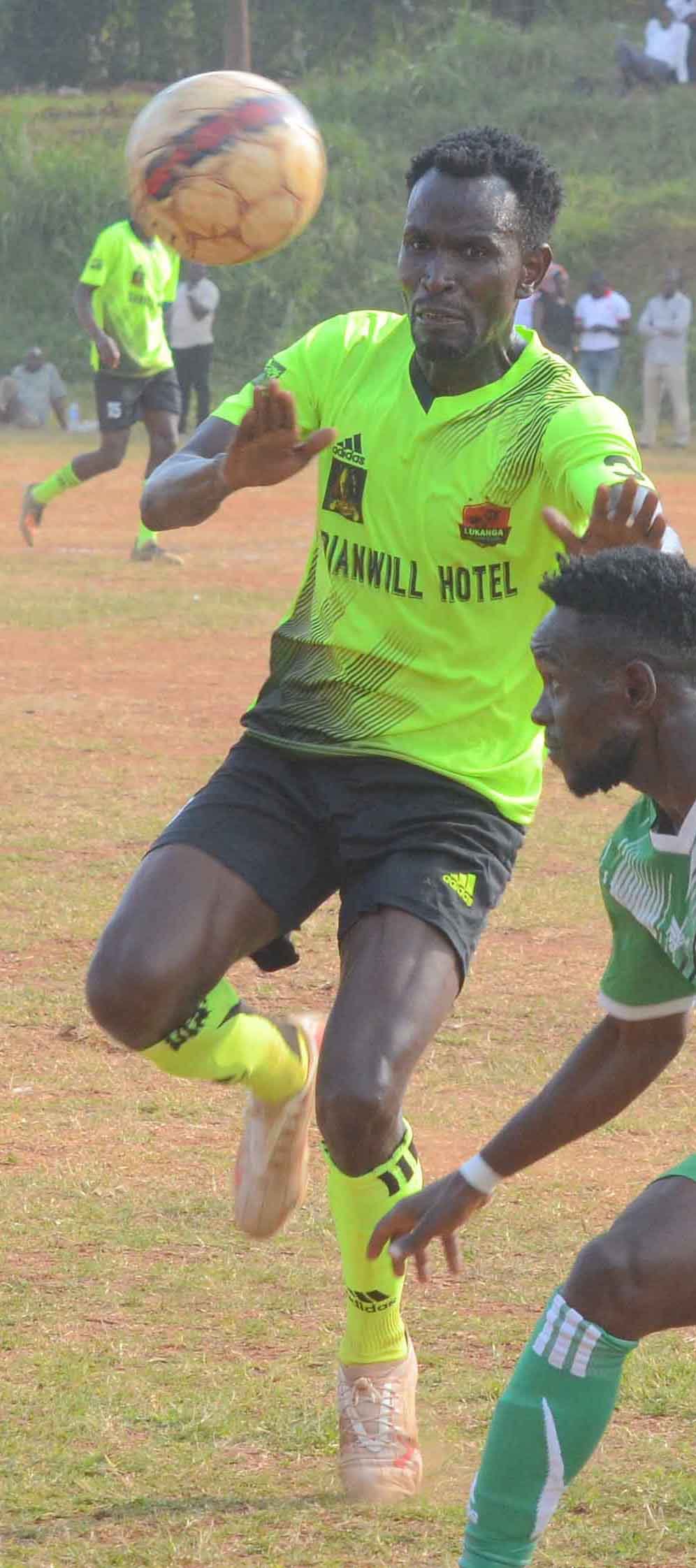

Personal information
- Date of birth: 6 March 1984 (age 42)
- Place of birth: Kampala, Uganda
- Height: 1.80 m (5 ft 11 in)
- Position: Midfielder

Senior career*
Years	Team	Apps	(Gls)
2003–2008	KCC		
2006–2007	→ APR (loan)	20	(9)
2008–2011	Srem	60	(8)
2011	→ Novi Pazar (loan)	14	(1)
2011–2012	URA		
2012–2013	Motor Lublin	16	(3)
2013–2015	Vipers		
2015–2016	Express		
2016–2017	KCCA		
2018	Bukavu Dawa		
2018–2020	Kyetume		
2020–2021	MYDA		

International career^{‡}
2004–2014	Uganda	40	(4)
- * Club domestic league appearances and goals as of 20 December 2017 ‡ National team caps and goals as of 20 December 2017

Vincent Kayizzi (born 6 March 1984) is a Ugandan professional footballer who plays as a midfielder.

== Club career ==
Kayizzi started playing in Ugandan Super League club Kampala City Council FC. In the 2006–07 season he had a spell in the leading Rwandan club Armée Patriotique Rwandaise FC. In January 2009 he moved to Europe to play in Serbian First League (second tier) club FK Srem, a club that is pioneer in Europe in bringing other Ugandan players, like Nestroy Kizito and Phillip Ssozi. He later had another stint in Europe, when he played with Motor Lublin in the Polish II liga during the 2012–13 season.

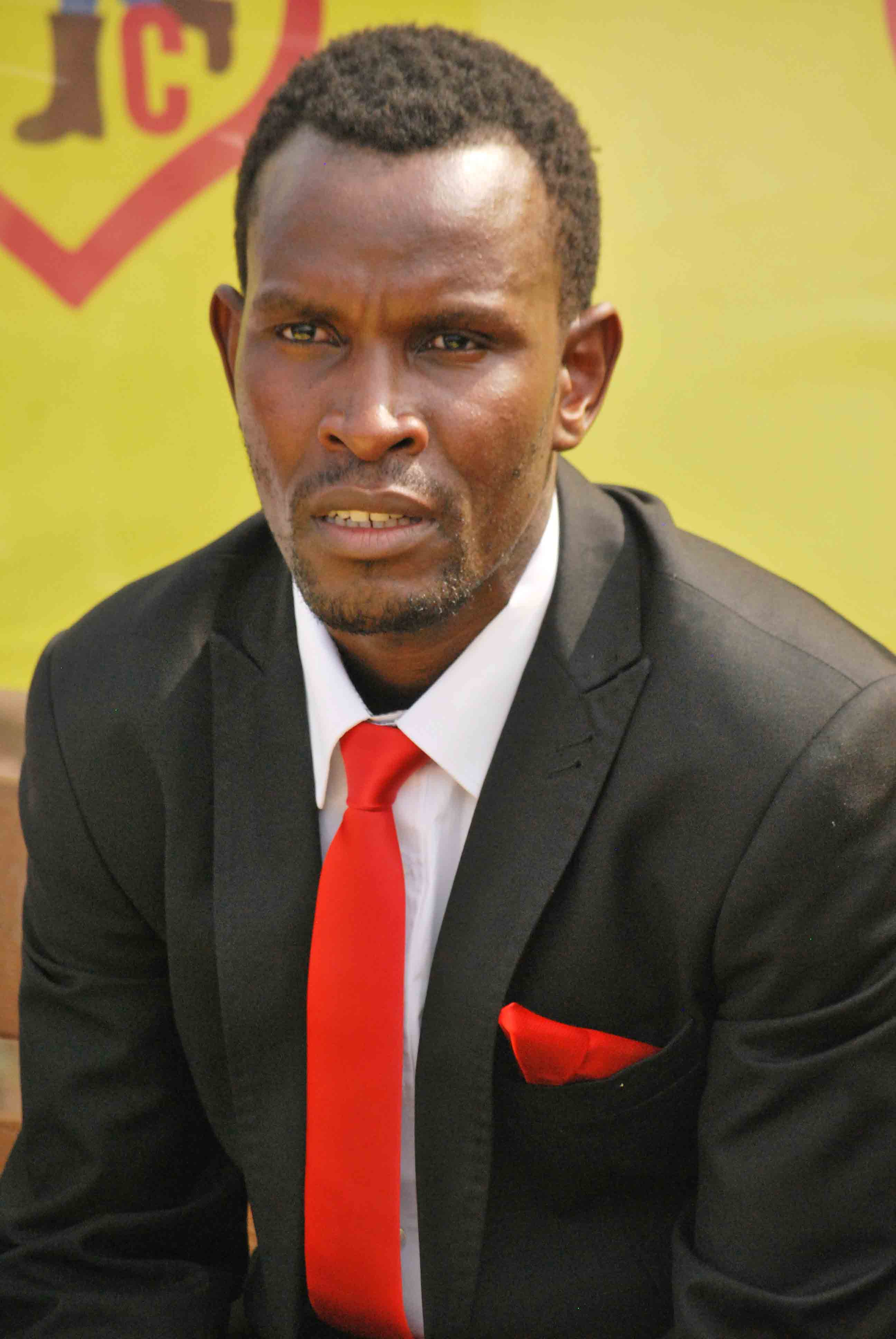
Vincent Kayizzi

== International career ==
Kayizzi played for the Uganda national football team from 2004 to 2014, having 40 caps and 4 goals scored.

== Honours ==
Kampala City Council

- Ugandan Super League: 2008, 2016–17
- Ugandan Cup: 2004, 2017

APR

- Rwandan Premier League: 2007
- Rwandan Cup: 2007

Uganda Revenue Authority

- Ugandan Super League: 2011

Vipers

- Ugandan Super League: 2014–15
