= Phillip Ssozi =

Ugandan footballer (born 1982)

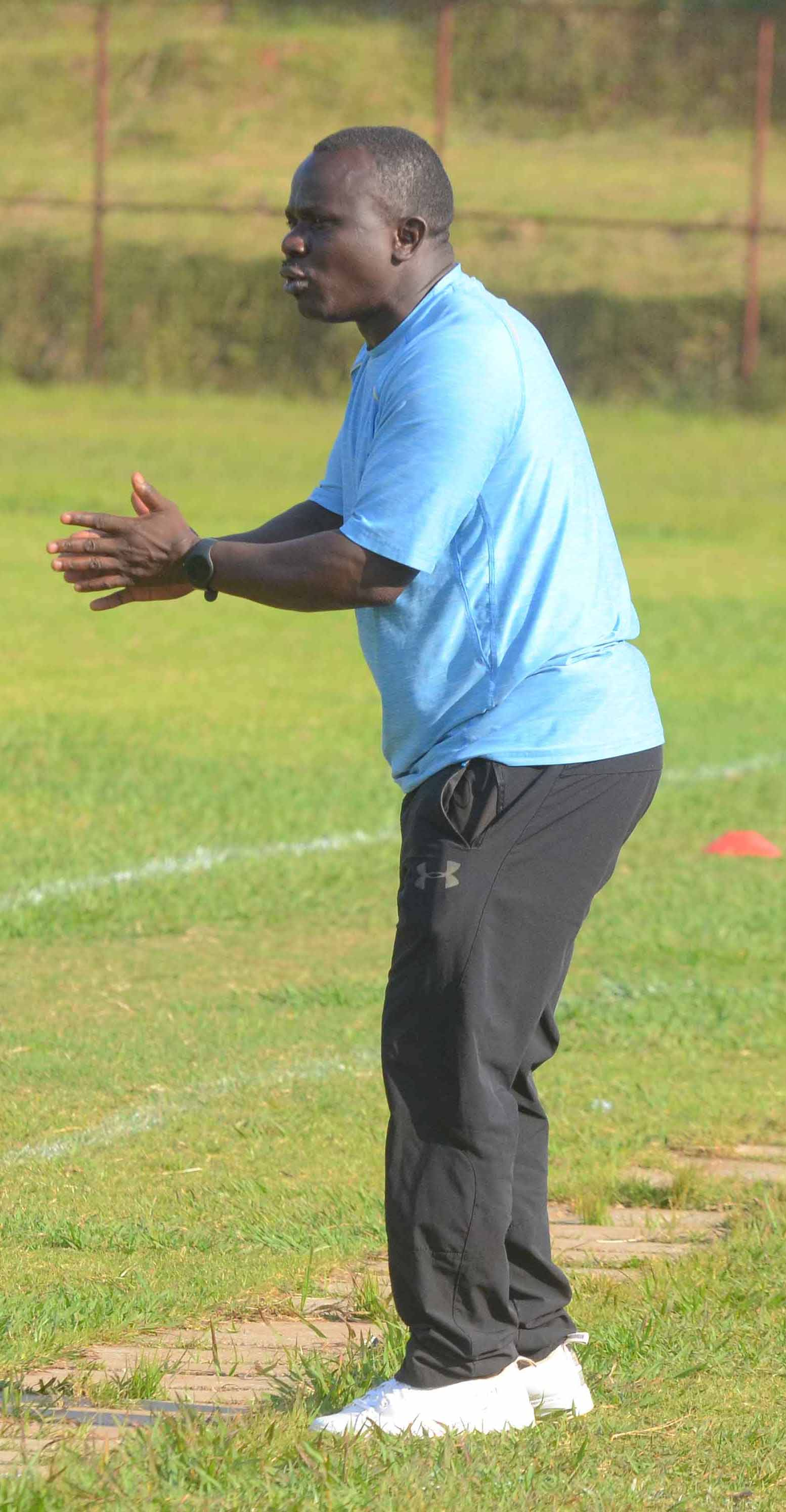

Personal information
- Date of birth: 23 July 1982 (age 44)
- Place of birth: Kampala, Uganda
- Position: Midfielder

Senior career*
Years	Team	Apps	(Gls)
1999–2003	Villa		
2003–2005	Srem	10	(0)
2005–2006	APR		
2006–2007	Victor		
2007–2013	Express		

International career
1999–2007	Uganda	26	(3)
- * Club domestic league appearances and goals

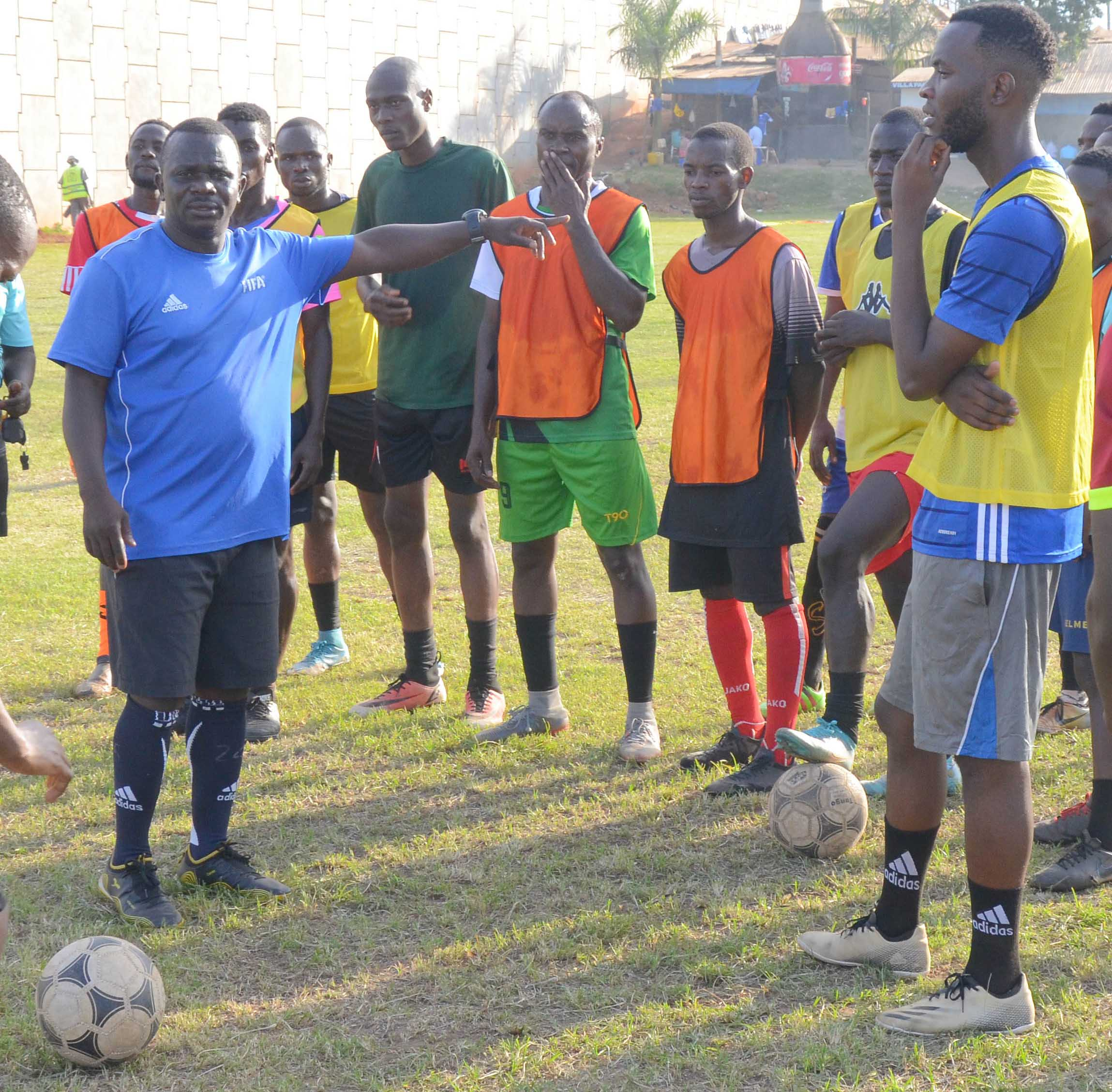
Phillip Ssozi

Phillip Ssozi (born 23 July 1982) is a Ugandan retired international footballer.

== Club career ==
Ssozi started his senior career in the Ugandan leading club SC Villa having won five national Championships in a row. In December 2003 he moved to Europe, to play for FK Srem in the Second League of Serbia and Montenegro. That club is known for bringing many Ugandan players to Europe, but after ending that season, Ssozi was back to Africa, this time to play in Rwandan leading club APR FC from the country's capital Kigali. There he won that year, 2005, the Rwandan Premier League. After that season, he was back to Uganda where he first played in Kampala's Victor FC and, since 2007 is playing in another capital's club, the Express Red Eagles.

== International career ==
Since 1999, Ssozi had played 22 matches for the Uganda national football team, scoring 2 goals.

== Honours ==
Villa

- Ugandan Super League: 1998, 1999, 2000, 2001, 2002, 2002–03, 2004
- Ugandan Cup: 1998, 2000, 2002
- CECAFA Clubs Cup: 2003
- East African Hedex Super Cup: 1999-00

APR

- Rwandan Premier League: 2005

Express

- Ugandan Super League: 2011–12
