= Kigozi Andrew Samson =

Ugandan association football player

Personal information
- Full name: Kigozi Andrew Samson
- Date of birth: May 11, 1995 (age 31)
- Place of birth: Uganda
- Position: Midfielder

Team information
- Current team: UPDF FC

Senior career*
Years	Team	Apps	(Gls)
–	Police FC		(5)
2020–2023	KCCA FC		
2023	Maroons FC		
2023	Wakiso Giants FC		
2024–	UPDF FC		(1)
- * Club domestic league appearances and goals

Kigozi Andrew Samson (born 11 May 1995) is a Ugandan footballer who plays as a midfielder for UPDF FC in the Uganda Premier League.

== Club career ==
=== Police Football Club ===
Kigozi began his football career at Police FC, where he spent a year and scored five goals in his first season.

=== Kampala Capital City Authority FC ===
In August 2020, Kigozi signed a three-year contract with KCCA FC. His move generated controversy over a 'tapping up' accusation. describing joining the 13-time champions as a 'dream come true'. His versatility was seen as a major asset to the club. He was released in 2022.

=== Maroons FC ===
After leaving KCCA, Kigozi joined Maroons FC for a short period.

=== Wakiso Giants FC ===
In 2023, Kigozi joined Wakiso Giants FC following his stint with Maroons FC.

=== UPDF FC ===
In 2024, Kigozi transferred to UPDF FC. He scored a goal for the club in a match against Lugazi in September 2024.
