= 1987 Uganda Super League =

Football season in Uganda

Uganda Super League
- Season: 1987
- Champions: SC Villa
- Top goalscorer: Majid Musisi, SC Villa (28)

The 1987 Ugandan Super League was the 20th season of the official Ugandan football championship, the top-level football league of Uganda.

== Overview ==
The 1987 Uganda Super League was contested by 12 teams and was won by SC Villa, while Uganda Commercial Bank and Maroons FC were relegated.

== League standings ==
Pos	Team	Pld	W	D	L	GF	GA	GD	Pts	Qualification or relegation (Note: Three matches were not completed.)
1	SC Villa (C)	22	17	5	0	56	13	+43	39	Champions
2	Express FC	21	11	8	2	38	14	+24	30	
3	Kampala City Council FC	21	13	2	6	43	20	+23	28	
4	Uganda Airlines	21	11	5	5	37	29	+8	27	
5	Nsambya Old Timers	21	8	6	7	29	26	+3	22	
6	Blue Bats	21	6	8	7	20	27	−7	20	
7	Nile Breweries FC	22	7	6	9	22	32	−10	20	
8	Buikwe	21	8	3	10	25	28	−3	19	
9	Bank of Uganda	22	7	5	10	23	29	−6	19	
10	Coffee Kakira	22	5	7	10	20	30	−10	17	
11	Uganda Commercial Bank FC (R)	22	4	3	15	16	49	−33	15 (Note: 4 bonus points awarded?)	Relegated
12	Maroons FC (R)	22	1	4	17	13	54	−41	6	Relegated

Source: rsssf.com
(C) Champions; (R) Relegated

== Leading goalscorer ==
The top goalscorer in the 1987 season was Majid Musisi of SC Villa with 28 goals.
