= 1971 Uganda National First Division League =

Football season in Uganda

Uganda National First Division League
- Season: 1971
- Champions: Army
- Top goalscorer: Polly Ouma, Simba FC (18)

The 1971 Uganda National First Division League was the fourth season of the Ugandan football championship, the top-level football league of Uganda.

== Overview ==
The 1971 Uganda National First Division League was contested by 8 teams and was won by Simba FC, the Army side. In the next two seasons of 1972 and 1973 the championship was not completed because of civil unrest.

== League standings ==
Pos	Team	Pld	W	D	L	GF	GA	GD	Pts	Qualification
1	Simba FC (C)	14	12	2	0	45	9	+36	26	Champions
2	Prisons	14	9	3	2	31	10	+21	21	
3	Coffee Kakira	14	7	3	4	31	16	+15	17	
4	Express FC	14	7	2	5	20	20	0	16	
5	Uganda Police FC	14	3	5	6	25	22	+3	11	
6	Jinja	14	3	3	8	22	49	−27	9	
7	Masaka	14	3	1	10	17	46	−29	7	
8	Kilembe Mines FC	14	2	2	10	23	34	−11	6	

(C) Champions

== Leading goalscorer ==
The top goalscorer in the 1971 season was Polly Ouma of Simba FC with 18 goals.
