= 2004 Uganda Super League =

Football season in Uganda

Uganda Super League
- Season: 2004
- Champions: SC Villa
- Top goalscorer: David Kiwanuka, Uganda Revenue Authority SC; Robert Ssentongo, Simba FC (10)

The 2004 Ugandan Super League was the 37th season of the official Ugandan football championship, the top-level football league of Uganda.

== Overview ==
The 2004 Uganda Super League was contested by 16 teams and was won by SC Villa, while Tower Of Praise TV, Iganga Town Council FC, Mbale Heroes, Ruhinda FC, Old Timers FC and Moyo Town Council FC were relegated.

== League standings ==
Pos	Team	Pld	W	D	L	GF	GA	GD	Pts	Qualification or relegation
1	SC Villa (C)	29	21	4	4	47	12	+35	67	Champions
2	Kampala City Council FC	29	17	7	5	50	25	+25	58	
3	Express FC	29	16	9	4	47	20	+27	57	
4	Uganda Revenue Authority SC	29	16	9	4	42	17	+25	57	
5	Police FC	29	11	8	10	38	24	+14	41	
6	SC Simba	29	11	7	11	34	31	+3	40	
7	Kinyara Sugar Works FC	29	11	7	11	35	33	+2	40	
8	Masaka Local Council FC	29	11	7	11	28	27	+1	40	
9	Ggaba United FC	29	11	6	12	32	35	−3	39	
10	Mityana UTODA	29	10	8	11	40	39	+1	38	
11	Tower of Praise TV (R)	29	10	7	12	30	35	−5	37	Relegated
12	Iganga Town Council FC (R)	29	8	7	14	21	40	−19	31	Relegated
13	Mbale Heroes (R)	29	6	11	12	20	34	−14	29	Relegated
14	Ruhinda FC (R)	29	7	6	16	23	54	−31	27	Relegated
15	Old Timers FC (R)	29	3	9	17	24	53	−29	18	Relegated
16	Moyo Town Council FC (R)	15	0	0	15	9	41	−32	0	Expelled

(C) Champions; (R) Relegated

== Leading goalscorer ==
The top goalscorers in the 2004 season were David Kiwanuka (Uganda Revenue Authority SC) and Robert Ssentongo (Simba FC) with 10 goals each.
