= Timothy Batabaire =

Ugandan retired football defender (born 1981)

Personal information
- Full name: Timothy Batabaire
- Date of birth: 25 August 1981 (age 45)
- Place of birth: Iganga, Uganda
- Height: 1.76 m (5 ft 9 in)
- Position: Central defender

Senior career*
Years	Team	Apps	(Gls)
1999–2003	SC Villa	?	(?)
2004	OFK Niš	11	(0)
2004–2009	Bloemfontein Celtic	101	(6)
2009–2013	Bidvest Wits	30	(2)
2013	Vasco da Gama	10	(0)
2014	Garankuwa United	0	(0)

International career
2000–2008	Uganda	34	(0)
- * Club domestic league appearances and goals

Timothy Batabaire (born 25 August 1981 in Iganga) is a Ugandan retired football (soccer) defender.

== Club career ==
Batabaire started playing in 1999 with SC Villa where he stayed until the end of 2003 season. Then he moved to Europe to play one year in the Second League of Serbia and Montenegro, with Serbian club OFK Niš, between the winter breaks of 2003–04 and 2004–05. In 2005, he began playing in South Africa with Bloemfontein Celtic, where he played five solid seasons before moving, in summer 2009, to another South African club Bidvest Wits. On August 19, 2014, he moved to South African National First Division club Garankuwa United F.C.

== International career ==
Batabaire has been a member of the Uganda national football team since 2000.

== Honours ==
SC Villa

- Uganda Premier League: 1999, 2000, 2001, 2002, 2002–03
- Uganda Cup: 2000, 2002

Bidvest Wits

- Nedbank Cup: 2010
