= Brian Nkuubi =

Ugandan footballer

Nkuubi Brian (born 1 November 1993 in Kampala, Uganda) is a Ugandan football player who has played for Vipers Soccer Club, Uganda Revenue Authority Football Club, Maroons Football Club and Kiira Young Football Club. He plays in the midfield position and in 2023 received an award for the Man of the Match in 2017. He has played in the Uganda Premier League.

Nkuubi Brian also plays for Uganda Sand Cranes, Uganda's national team who played in the International Beach Soccer tournament hosted Bamboo beach in Zanzibar. The tournaments in Uganda are governed by Federation of Ugandan Football Association FUFA and monitored by Ministry of Education and sports.
