= 2006–07 Uganda Super League =

Football season in Uganda

Uganda Super League
- Season: 2006–07
- Champions: Uganda Revenue Authority SC
- Top goalscorer: Hamis Kitagenda, Uganda Revenue Authority SC (20)

The 2006–07 Ugandan Super League was the 40th season of the official Ugandan football championship, the top-level football league of Uganda.

== Overview ==
The 2006–07 Uganda Super League was contested by 17 teams and was won by Uganda Revenue Authority SC, while Kanoni Mukono United FC, Mbale Heroes, City Lads and Masindi Town Council were relegated.

== League standings ==
Pos	Team	Pld	W	D	L	GF	GA	GD	Pts	Qualification or relegation
1	Uganda Revenue Authority SC (C)	32	22	7	3	54	18	+36	73	Champions
2	SC Villa	32	19	8	5	49	20	+29	65	
3	Police FC	32	17	10	5	40	15	+25	61	
4	Kampala City Council FC	32	17	6	9	51	33	+18	57	
5	Bunamwaya SC	32	15	8	9	38	29	+9	53	
6	Kinyara Sugar Works FC	32	12	13	7	37	29	+8	49	
7	Victors FC	32	12	11	9	34	33	+1	47	
8	Simba FC	32	13	6	13	34	25	+9	45	
9	Express FC	32	8	15	9	22	30	−8	39	
10	Masaka Local Council FC	32	8	13	11	22	30	−8	37	
11	Maji FC	32	8	12	12	36	45	−9	36	
12	Boroboro Holy Hill FC	32	9	9	14	26	37	−11	36	
13	Iganga Town Council FC	32	7	13	12	17	32	−15	34	
14	Kanoni Mukono United FC (R)	32	9	6	17	32	45	−13	33	Relegated
15	Mbale Heroes (R)	32	8	7	17	30	40	−10	31	Relegated
16	City Lads (R)	32	5	8	19	28	49	−21	23	Relegated
17	Masindi Town Council FC (R)	32	2	10	20	17	57	−40	16	Relegated

(C) Champions; (R) Relegated

== Leading goalscorer ==
The top goalscorer in the 2006–07 season was Hamis Kitagenda of Uganda Revenue Authority SC with 20 goals.
