= Joseph Kizito (footballer) =

Ugandan footballer

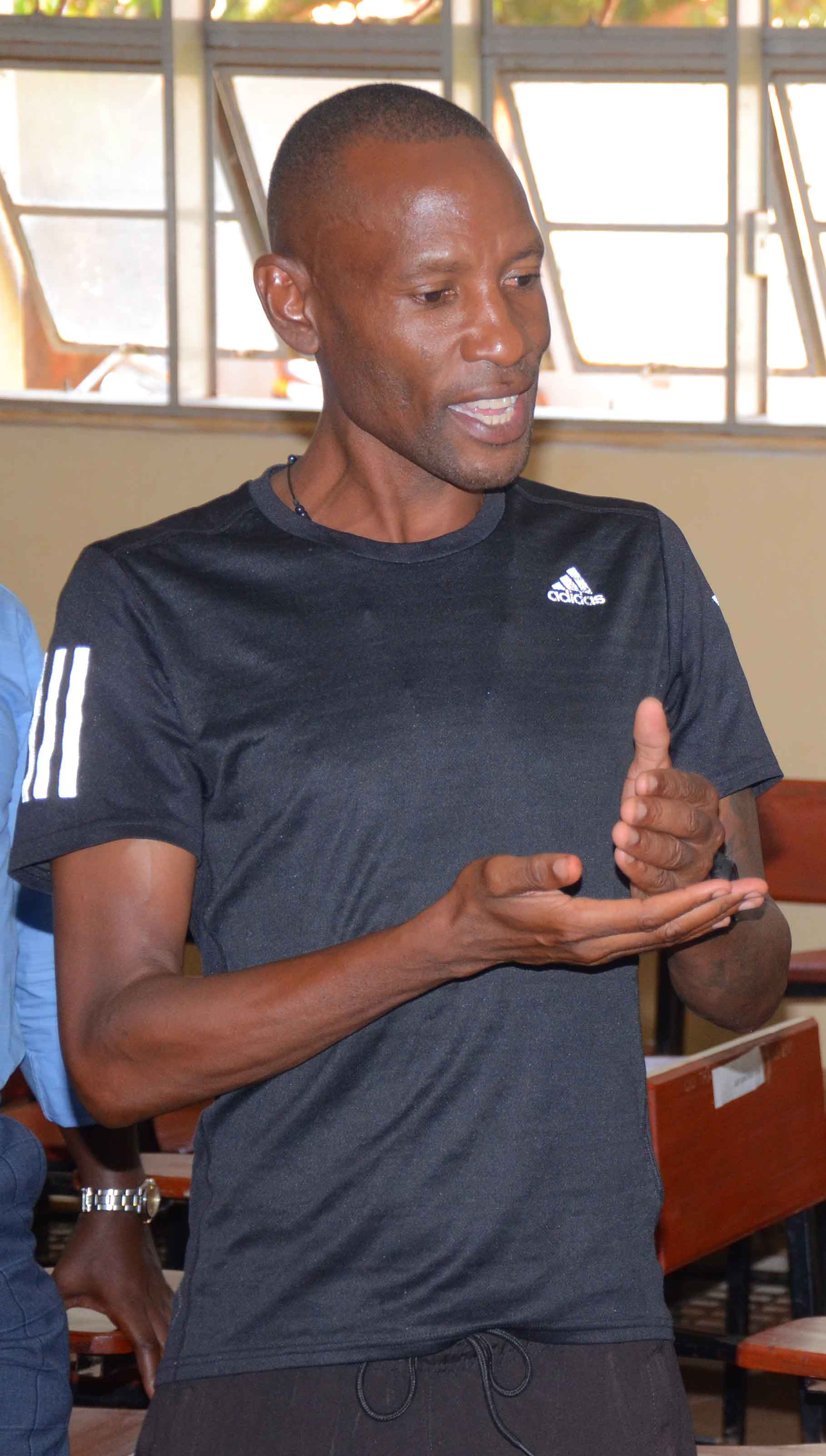
- Kizito in 2024

Personal information
- Full name: Joseph Nestroy Kizito
- Date of birth: 27 July 1982 (age 44)
- Place of birth: Mutukula, Tanzania
- Height: 1.78 m (5 ft 10 in)
- Position: Left-back

Youth career
- Lukuli Hearts

Senior career*
Years	Team	Apps	(Gls)
2000–2004	Villa		
2004–2005	Srem	21	(2)
2005–2010	Vojvodina	112	(1)
2010–2011	Partizan	14	(0)
2012–2015	Victoria University		
2015–2016	Lweza		
Total		147	(3)

International career
2001–2011	Uganda	39	(1)
- * Club domestic league appearances and goals

Joseph Nestroy Kizito (born 27 July 1982) is a Ugandan former professional footballer who played as a defender.

At international level, Kizito was capped 39 times for Uganda cranes between 2001 and 2011, scoring one goal.

== Early life ==
Kizito was born in Mutukula, Tanzania. He moved to Uganda as a teenager to attend a secondary school in Kyotera.

== Club career ==
After spending time with Lukuli Hearts, Kizito went on to play for Villa, helping them win four successive championship titles (2000, 2001, 2002, and 2002–03) and two national cups (2000 and 2002). He also won the Kagame Interclub Cup in 2003, before moving to Europe.

In early 2004, together with his teammate Phillip Ssozi, Kizito arrived in Serbia and Montenegro to join Second League club Srem. He spent the entire year there, earning a transfer to First League side Vojvodina in early 2005. Later that year, Kizito scored the only goal in a 1–0 victory over Red Star Belgrade. He thus helped Vojvodina defeat their rival for the first time in 10 years. Due to his consistent performances throughout the 2005–06 season, Kizito was voted the Vojvodina Player of the Season by the club's supporters. He continued to play regularly for the side over the following years, amassing over 100 league appearances. In January 2010, Kizito was demoted from the first team after refusing to extend his contract.

After becoming a free agent, Kizito signed a two-year contract with Partizan on 2 July 2010. He made his debut for the club 19 days later, playing the full 90 minutes in a 1–0 win away over Armenian champions Pyunik in the second leg of the 2010–11 UEFA Champions League second qualifying round. During the 2010–11 Serbian SuperLiga, Kizito recorded 14 appearances, all starts, as the club won the championship title. He also helped the side win the 2010–11 Serbian Cup, thus collecting the double. In October 2011, Kizito terminated his contract with Partizan by mutual agreement.

After returning to Uganda, Kizito signed with newly promoted Super League side Victoria University in August 2012, penning a one-year deal. He eventually spent three years there, before leaving in July 2015. Shortly after, Kizito joined fellow Ugandan club Lweza.

== International career ==
Kizito made his full international debut for Uganda in 2001. He went on to earn 39 caps for the Cranes over the following decade, scoring once. In February 2012, Kizito announced his retirement from international football.

== Personal life ==
Kizito is the younger brother of fellow footballer Manfred Kizito, a former Rwanda international.

== Career statistics ==
=== International ===
Appearances and goals by national team and year
National team	Year	Apps	Goals
Uganda	2001	4	1
Uganda	2002	8	0
Uganda	2003	3	0
Uganda	2004	5	0
Uganda	2005	3	0
Uganda	2006	2	0
Uganda	2007	4	0
Uganda	2008	5	0
Uganda	2009	–	
Uganda	2010	1	0
Uganda	2011	4	0
Total		39	1

Scores and results list Uganda's goal tally first, score column indicates score after each Kizito goal.

List of international goals scored by Joseph Kizito
No.	Date	Venue	Opponent	Score	Result	Competition
1	9 December 2001	Amahoro Stadium, Kigali, Rwanda	Djibouti	9–1	10–1	2001 CECAFA Cup

== Honours ==
Villa

- Uganda Super League: 2000, 2001, 2002, 2002–03
- Uganda Cup: 2000, 2002
- Kagame Interclub Cup: 2003

Partizan

- Serbian SuperLiga: 2010–11
- Serbian Cup: 2010–11

Victoria University

- Uganda Cup: 2013
