= 1975 Uganda National League =

Football season in Uganda

Uganda National League
- Season: 1975
- Champions: Express FC
- Top goalscorer: Chris Ddungu, Kampala City Council FC (12)

The 1975 Uganda National League was the eighth season of the Ugandan football championship, the top-level football league of Uganda.

== Overview ==
The 1975 Uganda National League was contested by 10 teams and was won by Express FC.

== League standings ==
| Pos | Team | Pld | W | D | L | GF | GA | GD | Pts | Qualification |
|---|---|---|---|---|---|---|---|---|---|---|
| 1 | Express FC (C) | 18 | 11 | 5 | 2 | 35 | 15 | +20 | 27 | Champions |
| 2 | Kampala City Council FC | 18 | 11 | 4 | 3 | 37 | 11 | +26 | 26 | |
| 3 | Simba FC | 18 | 11 | 4 | 3 | 36 | 15 | +21 | 26 | |
| 4 | Prisons FC Kampala | 18 | 10 | 2 | 6 | 31 | 17 | +14 | 22 | |
| 5 | Nsambya Old Timers | 18 | 7 | 7 | 4 | 28 | 24 | +4 | 21 | |
| 6 | Uganda Police FC | 18 | 6 | 6 | 6 | 22 | 30 | −8 | 18 | |
| 7 | Coffee SC | 18 | 5 | 4 | 9 | 25 | 32 | −7 | 14 | |
| 8 | Lint Marketing Board | 18 | 5 | 2 | 11 | 16 | 29 | −13 | 12 | |
| 9 | Gangama | 18 | 4 | 3 | 11 | 17 | 33 | −16 | 11 | |
| 10 | Kilembe Mines FC | 18 | 0 | 3 | 15 | 9 | 50 | −41 | 3 | |

(C) Champions

== Leading goalscorer ==
The top goalscorer in the 1975 season was Chris Ddungu of Kampala City Council FC with 12 goals.
