= 1970 Uganda National First Division League =

Football season in Uganda

Uganda National First Division League
- Season: 1970
- Champions: Coffee Kakira

The 1970 Uganda National First Division League was the third season of the Ugandan football championship, the top-level football league of Uganda.

== Overview ==
The 1970 Uganda National First Division League was contested by 11 teams and was won by Coffee SC.

== League standings ==
Pos	Team	Pld	W	D	L	GF	GA	GD	Pts	Qualification
1	Coffee Kakira (C)	10	8	1	1	34	7	+27	17	Champions
2	Uganda Police FC	10	8	1	1	29	8	+21	17	
3	Simba FC	10	6	3	1	38	11	+27	15	
4	Express FC	10	6	1	3	22	13	+9	13	
5	Prisons	10	5	1	4	37	15	+22	11	
6	Kilembe Mines FC	10	5	1	4	14	13	+1	11	
7	Soroti	10	4	0	6	18	35	−17	8	
8	Jinja	10	3	1	6	20	31	−11	7	
9	Masaka	10	3	0	7	13	20	−7	6	
10	Tororo	10	0	2	8	10	44	−34	2	
11	Lira	10	0	1	9	5	45	−40	1	

(C) Champions
