= 1984 Uganda Super League =

Football season in Uganda

Uganda Super League
- Season: 1984
- Champions: SC Villa
- Relegated: Bell FC; Lufula; Hodari
- Matches: 240
- Goals: 655 (2.73 per match)
- Top goalscorer: Frank Kyazze, Kampala City Council FC (18)

The 1984 Ugandan Super League was the 17th season of the official Ugandan football championship, the top-level football league of Uganda.

== Overview ==
The 1984 Uganda Super League was contested by 16 teams and was won by SC Villa, while Bell FC, Lufula, and Hodari were relegated.

== League standings ==
Pos	Team	Pld	W	D	L	GF	GA	GD	Pts	Qualification or relegation
1	SC Villa (C)	30	24	5	1	74	19	+55	53	Champions
2	Kampala City Council FC	30	21	7	2	67	19	+48	49	
3	Express FC	30	14	9	7	49	34	+15	37	
4	Coffee SC	30	13	10	7	48	36	+12	36	
5	Mbale Heroes	30	15	3	12	42	49	−7	33	
6	Nile Breweries FC	30	9	11	10	27	26	+1	29	
7	Masaka Union FC	30	10	9	11	35	49	−14	29	Did not participate in 1985 (Note: Insecurity in the country and subsequent war in 1985 resulted in Masaka being cut off from Kampala. As a result, FUFA suspended all Masaka Union FC's league games for the 1985 season, only allowing them to return to topflight football in 1986.)
8	Uganda Grain Milling	30	9	10	11	33	41	−8	28	Withdrew
9	Simba FC	30	11	5	14	40	34	+6	27	
10	Nytil FC	30	7	13	10	30	34	−4	27	
11	Uganda Commercial Bank	30	6	15	9	47	54	−7	27	
12	Maroons FC	30	8	10	12	38	47	−9	26	
13	Uganda Airlines	30	7	9	14	29	38	−9	23	
14	Bell FC (R)	30	6	9	15	37	52	−15	21	Relegated
15	Lufula (R)	30	7	6	17	33	71	−38	20	Relegated
16	Hodari (R)	30	3	8	19	26	54	−28	14	Relegated

(C) Champions; (R) Relegated

== Leading goalscorer ==
The top goalscorer in the 1984 season was Frank Kyazze of Kampala City Council FC with 18 goals.
