= 1989 Uganda Super League =

Football season in Uganda

Uganda Super League
- Season: 1989
- Champions: SC Villa
- Top goalscorer: Majid Musisi, SC Villa (15)

The 1989 Ugandan Super League was the 22nd season of the official Ugandan football championship, the top-level football league of Uganda.

== Overview ==
The 1989 Uganda Super League was contested by 12 teams and was won by SC Villa, while Mbale Heroes were relegated.

== League standings ==
| Pos | Team | Pld | W | D | L | GF | GA | GD | Pts | Qualification or relegation (Note: One match not completed.) |
|---|---|---|---|---|---|---|---|---|---|---|
| 1 | SC Villa (C) | 22 | 16 | 4 | 2 | 47 | 10 | +37 | 36 | Champions |
| 2 | Express FC | 22 | 14 | 7 | 1 | 37 | 21 | +16 | 35 | |
| 3 | Kampala City Council FC | 22 | 12 | 6 | 4 | 32 | 12 | +20 | 30 | |
| 4 | Uganda Airlines | 22 | 10 | 7 | 5 | 28 | 27 | +1 | 27 | |
| 5 | Spear Motors FC | 22 | 8 | 7 | 7 | 26 | 23 | +3 | 23 | |
| 6 | Nsambya Old Timers | 22 | 7 | 6 | 9 | 24 | 25 | −1 | 20 | |
| 7 | Nile Breweries FC | 21 | 4 | 11 | 6 | 13 | 17 | −4 | 19 | |
| 8 | Resistance | 22 | 6 | 7 | 9 | 20 | 31 | −11 | 18 (Note: 1 point deducted?) | |
| 9 | Coffee Kakira | 22 | 6 | 6 | 10 | 27 | 34 | −7 | 18 | |
| 10 | Bank of Uganda | 22 | 5 | 5 | 12 | 25 | 34 | −9 | 15 | |
| 11 | BN United | 21 | 4 | 7 | 10 | 20 | 30 | −10 | 15 | |
| 12 | Mbale Heroes (R) | 22 | 0 | 5 | 17 | 11 | 47 | −36 | 5 | Relegated |

Source: rsssf.com
(C) Champions; (R) Relegated

== Leading goalscorer ==
The top goalscorer in the 1989 season was Majid Musisi of SC Villa with 15 goals.
