= 1990 Uganda Super League =

Football season in Uganda

Uganda Super League
- Season: 1990
- Champions: SC Villa
- Top goalscorer: Majid Musisi, SC Villa (28)

The 1990 Ugandan Super League was the 23rd season of the official Ugandan football championship, the top-level football league of Uganda.

== Overview ==
The 1990 Uganda Super League was contested by 11 teams and was won by SC Villa, while BN United, Nile Breweries and Resistance were relegated.

== League standings ==
Pos	Team	Pld	W	D	L	GF	GA	GD	Pts	Qualification or relegation (Note: Record of one club is missing.)
1	SC Villa (C)	22	16	5	1	50	8	+42	37	Champions
2	Coffee Kakira	22	15	5	2	39	15	+24	35	
3	Kampala City Council FC	22	14	4	4	32	18	+14	32	
4	Express FC	22	11	4	7	26	17	+9	26	
5	Nsambya Old Timers	22	7	7	8	23	28	−5	21	
6	UCI	22	5	10	7	22	25	−3	20	
7	Uganda Airlines	22	8	4	10	28	31	−3	19 (Note: 1 point deducted?)	
8	Spear Motors FC	22	4	9	9	22	35	−13	17	
9	BN United (R)	22	6	5	11	21	34	−13	17	Relegated
10	Nile Breweries FC (R)	21	2	7	12	18	32	−14	11	Relegated
11	Resistance (R)	22	2	5	15	12	41	−29	9	Relegated

Source: rsssf.com
(C) Champions; (R) Relegated

== Leading goalscorer ==
The top goalscorer in the 1990 season was Majid Musisi of SC Villa with 28 goals.
