= Martin Ssenkoto Kalanda =

Ugandan football player (born 2003)

Personal information
- Date of birth: 5 June 2003 (age 23)
- Place of birth: Uganda
- Position: Goalkeeper

Senior career*
Years	Team	Apps	(Gls)
2020–2022	SC Villa	18	(0)
2023–2024	Express FC	1	(0)
- * Club domestic league appearances and goals

Martin Ssenkoto Kalanda (born 5 June 2003) is a Ugandan professional footballer who plays as a goalkeeper.

== Club carrier ==
Ssenkoto played with SC Villa the Uganda Premier League during the 2020–21 and 2021–22 seasons. He played for UPDF FC during the 2022–23 season before joining Express FC. Ssenkoto made one Uganda Premier League appearance for Express FC during the 2023–24 season and left the club in January 2024.
