= 1992 Uganda Super League =

Football season in Uganda

Uganda Super League
- Season: 1992
- Champions: SC Villa
- Top goalscorer: Majid Musisi, SC Villa (29)

The 1992 Ugandan Super League was the 25th season of the official Ugandan football championship, the top-level football league of Uganda.

== Overview ==
The 1992 Uganda Super League was contested by 14 teams and was won by SC Villa, while Spear Motors FC, Entebbe Works FC and Green Valley were relegated.

== League standings ==
Pos	Team	Pld	W	D	L	GF	GA	GD	Pts	Qualification or relegation
1	SC Villa (C)	26	22	3	1	68	11	+57	47	Champions
2	Express FC	26	17	7	2	43	19	+24	41	
3	Coffee Kakira	26	14	9	3	47	23	+24	37	
4	Kampala City Council FC	26	11	9	6	37	28	+9	31	
5	Uganda Commercial Bank FC	26	13	3	10	49	44	+5	29	
6	Bell FC	26	10	6	10	27	39	−12	26	
7	Nile Breweries FC	26	10	4	12	39	39	0	24	
8	Nsambya Old Timers	26	9	5	12	24	27	−3	23	
9	UCI	26	7	9	10	27	38	−11	23	
10	Arua Municipal Council FC	26	9	4	13	31	41	−10	22	
11	Uganda Airlines	26	5	10	11	28	34	−6	20	
12	Spear Motors FC (R)	26	6	8	12	28	50	−22	20	Relegated
13	Entebbe Works FC (R)	26	4	8	14	25	39	−14	16	Relegated
14	Green Valley (R)	26	1	3	22	10	64	−54	5	Relegated

(C) Champions; (R) Relegated

== Leading goalscorer ==
The top goalscorer in the 1992 season was Majid Musisi of SC Villa with 29 goals.
