= David Bagoole =

Ugandan association footballer

David Bagoole (born April 4, 1998) is a Ugandan professional footballer who plays as an attacking midfielder for Wakiso Giants FC. He is best known for his time with Vipers SC, one of Uganda's top football clubs. Nicknamed "Tong Po" and "The Animal," Bagoole is celebrated for his physicality, dribbling, and passing abilities.

== Early life and education ==
Bagoole was born on April 4, 1998, in Busembatia, Uganda, where he began playing football at a young age. He started his career at his hometown club, Busembatia Town Council. David Bagoole is the younger brother of the late Johnson Bagoole, a former Uganda Cranes player.

== Club career ==
Bagoole's professional journey began with Busembatia Town Council. He later played for several Ugandan clubs, including SC Villa, Police FC, and Baza Holdings. In 2015, he moved to Kenya to join Sofapaka before signing with La Passe in Seychelles in 2016. After returning to Uganda in 2017, Bagoole joined BUL FC and later had a stint with DR Congo's OC Bukavu Dawa. In 2019, he signed for Busoga United, where he played until the abrupt end of the 2019–20 season due to the COVID-19 pandemic.

On August 14, 2020, Vipers SC officially unveiled Bagoole as their new signing under head coach Fred Kajoba Kisitu. In 2023, Bagoole joined Wakiso Giants FC, continuing his career in the Uganda Premier League as a key attacking midfielder.

== Style of Play ==
Bagoole is known for his robust style of play, often covering large areas of the pitch. He excels in dribbling and delivering accurate passes over various ranges. His nickname, "Tong Po," reflects his tenacity and flair on the field.

== Controversy ==
Bagoole, a midfielder, is officially registered as a 26-year-old, born in 1998, but many fans have expressed skepticism based on his appearance. Despite the speculation, his documentation has reportedly passed all necessary checks in Africa, confirming him as a 26-year-old player.
