= Patrick Ochan (footballer) =

Ugandan footballer (born 1990)

Personal information
- Full name: Patrick Ochan
- Date of birth: December 10, 1990 (age 35)
- Place of birth: Gulu, Uganda
- Height: 1.83 m (6 ft 0 in)
- Position: Midfielder

Team information
- Current team: Kyetume FC
- Number: 18

Senior career*
Years	Team	Apps	(Gls)
2007–2008	Uganda Revenue Authority SC	15	(8)
2008–2009	Saint George FC	20	(4)
2009–2010	Uganda Revenue Authority SC	19	(9)
2010	Saint George FC	15	(2)
2011	Simba SC	20	(6)
2011–2015	TP Mazembe	58	(13)
2015–2016	Uganda Revenue Authority SC	29	(9)
2017	Bukavu Dawa	19	(1)
2018-	Kyetume FC	21	(4)

International career^{‡}
2012–	Uganda	30	(1)
- * Club domestic league appearances and goals as of 11 September 2017 ‡ National team caps and goals as of 11 September 2017

Patrick Ochan (born December 10, 1990) is a Ugandan professional footballer who plays as a midfielder for Kyetume FC in the Uganda Super League and for the Uganda national team as a midfielder.

Ochan Patrick is a former Uganda cranes international midfielder and he is capped 30times for the cranes.

Ochan Patrick also played professional football both in Uganda and other countries e.g played in DR Congo, Ethiopia, Tanzania, Indonesia Seychelles.

Ochan Patrick is now a qualified football coach who enrolled his Coach career in 2022 and now holds a CAF C coaching diploma certificate and a member of the Uganda football coaches association UFCA

In 2022-2023 season Ochan Patrick worked with kigezi home boyz which was in the western regional league and got the team promoted to FUFA big league

In 2023-2024 Ochan Patrick worked with rugarama football club which was new in the western regional league and keep them in the league as they finished second and also reached the last round of 32 teams in the Stanbic Uganda cup for the first time only to be eliminated by Uganda football giants Vipers sports club in penalty shoot outs after 1:1 draw in full time.

== Playing history ==
Patrick has previously played in Uganda Revenue Authority SC, Saint George FC in Ethiopia, Simba SC in Tanzania, TP Mazembe in Democratic Republic of Congo and currently in Uganda Revenue Authority SC.: Lapasse Football Club in Seychelles Premier League. Comeback to URA Uganda Revenue Authority SC in 2015-2017, after that he went to Bukavu Dawa in Democratic Republic of Congo in 2017. In September 2018, he joined Kyetume FC .

== International career ==
Uganda
Year	Apps	Goals
2006	1	0
2007	2	0
2009	13	0
2010	4	0
2011	6	0
2012	4	1
Total	30	1

Statistics accurate as of match played 10 September 2017

=== International goals ===
Scores and results list Uganda's goal tally first.

No	Date	Venue	Opponent	Score	Result	Competition
1.	21 March 2009	Mandela National Stadium, Kampala, Uganda	Malawi	1–1	2–1	Friendly

== Honours ==
Uganda Revenue Authority

- Ugandan Super League: 2006–07, 2008–09

Saint George

- Ethiopian Premier League: 2008, 2010

TP Mazembe

- Linafoot: 2011, 2012, 2013, 2014
- Super Coupe du Congo: 2013, 2014

Uganda

- CECAFA Cup: 2009, 2011, 2012
