= Ronald Otti =

Ugandan footballer (born 2000)

Personal information
- Full name: Ronald Otti Ociti
- Date of birth: 6 December 2000 (age 25)
- Place of birth: Namulonge, Wakiso District, Uganda
- Position: Defender

Team information
- Current team: Kitara FC

Youth career
- Nangabo Green Valley

Senior career*
Years	Team	Apps	(Gls)
2022	Mbarara City FC		
2022–2024	BUL FC		
2024–Present	Kitara FC		

International career
2024–Present	Uganda		
- * Club domestic league appearances and goals

Ronald Otti (born 6 December 2000) is a Ugandan professional footballer who plays as a defender for Kitara FC in the Uganda Premier League and the Uganda national football team. He was named the Uganda Premier League best defender in the 2023–24 season.

== Early life and education ==
Otti was born in Namulonge, Wakiso District, Uganda. He attended Namulonge Primary School and Namulonge Secondary School, before completing his studies at Ubuntu High School.

== Club career ==
=== Mbarara City ===
Otti began his career with Mbarara City FC, where he played until 2022.

=== BUL FC ===
In 2022, Otti signed a two-year contract with BUL FC. He was named the Uganda Premier League Best Defender for the 2023–24 season.

=== Kitara FC ===
In July 2024, Otti signed a one-year deal with Kitara FC.

== International career ==
Otti received his first senior call-up to the Uganda national football team in June 2024 for the 2026 FIFA World Cup qualifiers, replacing injured defender Bevis Mugabi.

== Style of play ==
Otti is primarily a defender, noted for his aerial ability, physical strength, and reading of the game.

== Honours ==
Individual

- Uganda Premier League Best Defender: 2023–24

== See also ==
- Allan Okello
- Reagan Mpande
