= 1988 Uganda Super League =

Football season in Uganda

Uganda Super League
- Season: 1988
- Champions: SC Villa
- Top goalscorer: Mathias Kaweesa, Nsambya FC (17)

The 1988 Ugandan Super League was the 21st season of the official Ugandan football championship, the top-level football league of Uganda.

== Overview ==
The 1988 Uganda Super League was won by SC Villa, while Tobacco, State House FC and UCI were relegated.

== League standings ==
The final league table is not available for 1988. Teams that competed in the Super League included:

- SC Villa - Champions
- Express FC
- Kampala City Council FC
- Nsambya Old Timers
- Coffee Kakira
- Uganda Airlines
- Nile Breweries FC
- Tobacco - Relegated
- State House FC - Relegated
- UCI - Relegated

== Leading goalscorer ==
The top goalscorer in the 1988 season was Mathias Kaweesa of Nsambya FC with 17 goals.
