= 1998 Uganda Super League =

Football season in Uganda

Uganda Super League
- Season: 1998
- Champions: SC Villa
- Top goalscorer: Charles Kayemba, SC Villa (18)

The 1998 Ugandan Super League was the 31st season of the official Ugandan football championship, the top-level football league of Uganda.

== Overview ==
The 1998 Uganda Super League, known as the Nile Special League Serie A, was contested by 8 teams and was won by SC Villa. The second level, known as the Nile Special League Serie B, was contested by 9 teams and was won by Health. At the end of the season Serie A and B were combined and the Super League reverted to its original format.

== League standings ==
=== Nile Special League Serie A (First Level) ===
Pos	Team	Pld	W	D	L	GF	GA	GD	Pts	Qualification
1	SC Villa (C)	21	14	3	4	43	12	+31	45	Champions
2	Express FC	21	13	5	3	44	17	+27	44	
3	SC Simba	21	10	9	2	27	10	+17	39	
4	Kampala City Council FC	21	8	7	6	29	21	+8	31	
5	Umeme FC	21	6	6	9	21	21	0	24	
6	Police FC	21	4	4	13	22	43	−21	16	
7	Nile Breweries FC	21	3	7	11	12	34	−22	16	
8	Dairy Heroes	21	4	3	14	20	60	−40	15	

(C) Champions

=== Nile Special League Serie B (Second Level) ===
Pos	Team	Pld	W	D	L	GF	GA	GD	Pts	Qualification
1	Health (C)	16	9	4	3	25	15	+10	31	Champions
2	SCOUL	15	7	6	2	30	20	+10	27	
3	Iganga Town Council FC	15	7	6	2	22	17	+5	27	
4	Pamba FC	16	6	4	6	23	19	+4	22	
5	Military Police FC	16	5	6	5	20	20	0	21	
6	Posta	14	4	6	4	16	20	−4	18	
7	Toro	15	4	4	7	17	14	+3	16	
8	Roraima FC	16	3	5	8	9	25	−16	14	
9	State House FC	15	3	2	10	18	30	−12	11	

(C) Champions

== Leading goalscorer ==
The top goalscorer in the 1998 season was Charles Kayemba of SC Villa with 18 goals.
