= 1986 Uganda Super League =

Football season in Uganda

Uganda Super League
- Season: 1986
- Champions: SC Villa
- Top goalscorer: Charles Letti, Tobacco FC (29)

The 1986 Ugandan Super League was the 19th season of the official Ugandan football championship, the top-level football league of Uganda.

== Overview ==
The 1986 Uganda Super League was contested by 15 teams and was won by SC Villa, while Bell FC, Nytil FC and Masaka Union FC were relegated.

== League standings ==
Pos	Team	Pld	W	D	L	GF	GA	GD	Pts	Qualification or relegation
1	SC Villa (C)	28	22	5	1	69	12	+57	49	Champions
2	Tobacco FC	28	15	7	6	61	34	+27	37 (Note: Tobacco defeated Uganda Airlines 12-0 in their final game to take second place from Coffee SC but were later demoted.)	Demoted
3	Coffee SC	28	16	5	7	49	23	+26	37	
4	Kampala City Council FC	28	15	7	6	44	29	+15	37	
5	Uganda Airlines FC	28	14	5	9	32	38	−6	33	
6	Bank of Uganda FC	28	13	5	10	37	34	+3	31	
7	Nsambya Old Timers FC	28	10	8	10	29	33	−4	28	
8	Express FC	28	9	9	10	25	28	−3	27	
9	Nile Breweries FC	28	7	10	11	21	25	−4	24	
10	Maroons FC	28	9	5	14	23	31	−8	23	
11	Uganda Commercial Bank FC	28	8	6	14	30	39	−9	22	
12	Bell FC (R)	28	9	4	15	33	51	−18	22	Relegated
13	Buikwe FC	28	8	5	15	28	44	−16	21	
14	Nytil FC (R)	28	6	6	16	21	46	−25	18	Relegated
15	Masaka Union FC (R)	28	2	8	18	25	57	−32	12	Relegated

Source: rsssf.com
(C) Champions; (R) Relegated

== Leading goalscorer ==
The top goalscorer in the 1986 season was Charles Letti of Tobacco FC with 29 goals.
