= 1982 Uganda Super League =

Football season in Uganda

Uganda Super League
- Season: 1982
- Champions: SC Villa
- Top goalscorer: Issa Ssekatawa, Express FC (22)

The 1982 Ugandan Super League was the 15th season of the official Ugandan football championship, the top-level football league of Uganda.

== Overview ==
The 1982 Uganda Super League was contested by 10 teams and was won by SC Villa. It was the first time that the Ugandan football championship was known as the Uganda Super League, the shortened title Super Ten being used during the first season.

== League standings ==
Pos	Team	Pld	W	D	L	GF	GA	GD	Pts	Qualification
1	SC Villa (C)	17	11	6	0	30	9	+21	28	Champions
2	Kampala City Council FC	17	11	3	3	30	19	+11	25	
3	Express FC	18	9	6	3	32	20	+12	24	
4	Nile Breweries FC	18	5	8	5	17	19	−2	18	
5	Tobacco	18	6	5	7	26	30	−4	17	
6	Masaka Union FC	18	5	5	8	19	26	−7	15	
7	Lufula	18	4	6	8	27	37	−10	14	
8	Uganda Commercial Bank FC	18	4	5	9	23	29	−6	13	
9	Nytil FC	18	1	10	7	15	24	−9	12	
10	Maroons FC	18	3	6	9	12	24	−12	12	

(C) Champions

== Leading goalscorer ==
The top goalscorer in the 1982 season was Issa Ssekatawa of Express FC with 22 goals.
