= 1994 Uganda Super League =

Football season in Uganda

Uganda Super League
- Season: 1994
- Champions: SC Villa
- Top goalscorer: Adolf Bora, Coffee Kakira (21)

The 1994 Ugandan Super League was the 27th season of the official Ugandan football championship, the top-level football league of Uganda.

== Overview ==
The 1994 Uganda Super League was contested by 14 teams and was won by SC Villa, while Bell FC, Uganda Commercial Bank and Arua Municipal Council FC were relegated.

== League standings ==
Pos	Team	Pld	W	D	L	GF	GA	GD	Pts	Qualification or relegation
1	SC Villa (C)	28	20	7	1	53	16	+37	67	Champions
2	Express FC	28	20	5	3	64	14	+50	65	
3	Kampala City Council FC	28	14	9	5	45	22	+23	51	
4	Nile Breweries	28	11	7	10	36	36	0	40	
5	Miracle	28	11	6	11	26	33	−7	39	
6	Coffee Kakira	28	10	8	10	39	38	+1	38	
7	SCOUL	28	8	12	8	29	30	−1	36	
8	Dairy Corporation	28	8	9	11	33	31	+2	33	
9	Nsambya Old Timers	28	8	8	12	26	30	−4	32	
10	Uganda Electricity Board	28	8	8	12	19	28	−9	32	
11	Bell FC (R)	28	9	5	14	35	49	−14	32	Relegated
12	Entebbe Works FC	28	7	9	12	27	43	−16	30	
13	Uganda Commercial Bank FC (R)	28	4	10	14	31	45	−14	22	Relegated
14	Arua Municipal Council FC (R)	28	2	8	18	16	72	−56	14	Relegated

(C) Champions; (R) Relegated

== Leading goalscorer ==
The top goalscorer in the 1994 season was Adolf Bora of Coffee Kakira with 21 goals.
