= Patrick Ochan =

Patrick Ochan may refer to:

- Patrick Ochan (cricketer)
- Patrick Ochan (footballer)
