= 1991 Uganda Super League =

Football season in Uganda

Uganda Super League
- Season: 1991
- Champions: Kampala City Council FC
- Top goalscorer: Mathias Kaweesa, Coffee Kakira (18)

The 1991 Ugandan Super League was the 24th season of the official Ugandan football championship, the top-level football league of Uganda.

== Overview ==
The 1991 Uganda Super League was contested by 12 teams and was won by Kampala City Council FC, while Nytil FC and Busia were relegated.

== League standings ==
| Pos | Team | Pld | W | D | L | GF | GA | GD | Pts | Qualification or relegation (Note: Final table indicates that a number of matches were not completed.) |
|---|---|---|---|---|---|---|---|---|---|---|
| 1 | Kampala City Council FC (C) | 19 | 16 | 3 | 0 | 44 | 11 | +33 | 35 | Champions |
| 2 | SC Villa | 19 | 14 | 5 | 0 | 40 | 7 | +33 | 33 | |
| 3 | Coffee Kakira | 20 | 13 | 5 | 2 | 39 | 10 | +29 | 31 | |
| 4 | Express FC | 20 | 13 | 5 | 2 | 39 | 10 | +29 | 31 | |
| 5 | Spear Motors FC | 22 | 7 | 8 | 7 | 33 | 29 | +4 | 22 | |
| 6 | Nsambya Old Timers | 21 | 6 | 7 | 8 | 18 | 19 | −1 | 19 | |
| 7 | Uganda Airlines | 19 | 5 | 6 | 8 | 23 | 27 | −4 | 16 | |
| 8 | Entebbe Works FC | 22 | 7 | 1 | 14 | 21 | 34 | −13 | 15 | |
| 9 | Bell FC | 20 | 4 | 6 | 10 | 19 | 36 | −17 | 14 | |
| 10 | UCI | 19 | 4 | 4 | 11 | 22 | 33 | −11 | 12 | |
| 11 | Nytil FC (R) | 22 | 2 | 6 | 14 | 13 | 42 | −29 | 10 | Relegated |
| 12 | Busia (R) | 21 | 1 | 6 | 14 | 12 | 47 | −35 | 8 | Relegated |

Source: rsssf.com
(C) Champions; (R) Relegated

== Leading goalscorer ==
The top goalscorer in the 1991 season was Mathias Kaweesa of Coffee Kakira with 18 goals.
