= Manfred Kizito =

Rwandan footballer (born 1980)

Personal information
- Date of birth: 14 March 1980 (age 46)
- Place of birth: Kampala, Uganda
- Position: Midfielder

Senior career*
Years	Team	Apps	(Gls)
1999	Police		
2001–2004	Villa		
2004–2006	APR		
2007–2010	ATRACO		

International career
2004–2007	Rwanda	19	(0)
- * Club domestic league appearances and goals

Manfred Kizito (born 14 March 1980) is a retired footballer who played as a midfielder. Born in Uganda, he represented Rwanda at international level.

== Club career ==
Born in Kampala, Uganda, Kizito spent his early career playing for Police and Villa, before moving to Rwanda in 2005 to play with APR and ATRACO.

== International career ==
Despite being born in Uganda, Kizito was offered a Rwandan passport, and represented their national side, earning 19 caps between 2004 and 2007, including in six FIFA World Cup qualifying matches.

== Personal life ==
His brother Nestroy is also a footballer.
