= 2001 Uganda Super League =

Football season in Uganda

Uganda Super League
- Season: 2001
- Champions: SC Villa
- Top goalscorer: Hassan Mubiru, Express FC (27)

The 2001 Ugandan Super League was the 34th season of the official Ugandan football championship, the top-level football league of Uganda.

== Overview ==
The 2001 Uganda Super League was contested by 15 teams and was won by SC Villa, while Military Police FC, Chicago FC, Horizon FC, Rock Star FC and Black Rhino were relegated.

== League standings ==
Pos	Team	Pld	W	D	L	GF	GA	GD	Pts	Qualification or relegation
1	SC Villa (C)	28	22	4	2	65	20	+45	70	Champions
2	Kampala City Council FC	28	18	9	1	68	20	+48	63	
3	Express FC	28	14	7	7	37	25	+12	49	
4	SCOUL	28	12	11	5	31	22	+9	47	
5	SC Simba	28	12	8	8	41	31	+10	44	
6	Mbarara United FC	28	13	5	10	42	41	+1	44	
7	Mbale Heroes	26	12	7	7	54	28	+26	43	
8	Masaka Local Council FC	28	11	8	9	25	35	−10	41	
9	Iganga Town Council FC	28	11	7	10	23	30	−7	40	
10	Police FC	28	9	11	8	31	26	+5	38	
11	Military Police FC (R)	28	8	6	14	33	40	−7	30	Relegated
12	Chicago FC (R)	28	5	8	15	20	46	−26	23	Relegated
13	Horizon FC (R)	27	1	14	12	19	39	−20	17	Relegated
14	Rock Star FC (R)	27	2	4	21	18	58	−40	10	Relegated
15	Black Rhino (R)	28	1	4	23	15	71	−56	7	Relegated

(C) Champions; (R) Relegated

== Leading goalscorer ==
The top goalscorer in the 2001 season was Hassan Mubiru of Express FC with 27 goals.
