= Victors FC =

Ugandan football club

- Full name: Victors Football Club
- Founded: 2001
- Dissolved: 2013
- Ground: Jinja, Uganda
- League: Ugandan Premier League
- 2012/13: 14th (relegated)

Victors FC was a Ugandan association football team based in Kampala which played in the Ugandan Super League until their relegation in 2012.

Victors FC won the Ugandan Cup twice and also appeared in the CAF Confederations Cup. As part of their Confederations Cup run, the club saved $1,500 by requesting referees from Tanzania instead of Eritrea.

The club was relegated in 2013 and failed to register for the second division the following season.

== Record in the top tier ==
Season	Tier	League	Pos.	Pl.	W	D	L	GS	GA	Pts	Movements
2005	1	Uganda Super League; Group B	2nd	8	4	3	1	11	7	15	Qualified for KO phase: reached quarter-finals
2006	1	Uganda Super League	6th	28	14	7	7	28	20	49	
2006–07	1	Uganda Super League	7th	32	12	11	9	34	33	47	
2007–08	1	Uganda Super League	5th	34	12	16	6	32	22	52	
2008–09	1	Uganda Super League	10th	34	11	11	12	31	30	44	
2009–10	1	Uganda Super League	13th	34	9	14	11	25	30	41	
2010–11	1	Uganda Super League	5th	26	10	9	7	33	22	39	
2011–12	1	Uganda Super League	11th	28	7	12	9	21	11	33	
2012–13	1	Uganda Super League	14th	30	5	14	11	17	30	29	Relegated
Present		No evidence that the club is currently operating.									

== Achievements ==
- Ugandan Premier League: 0
- Ugandan Cup: 2

2008, 2010.

== African Cups history ==
Season	Competition	Round	Club	1st leg	2nd leg	Aggregate
2009	CAF Confederation Cup	Preliminary round	(Zimbabwe) CAPS United F.C.	0–2	0–1	0–3
2011	CAF Confederation Cup	Preliminary round	(Eswatini) Mbabane Highlanders	1–1	1–1	2–2 (4–1 p)
2011	CAF Confederation Cup	First round	(Democratic Republic of the Congo) Motema Pembe	1–1	0–1	1–2
