= Herbert Achayi =

Ugandan footballer

Personal information
- Full name: Herbert Achayi
- Date of birth: 8 August 1999 (age 27)
- Height: 1.85 m (6 ft 1 in)
- Position: Defender

Team information
- Current team: KCCA FC

Youth career
- KCCA FC Academy

Senior career*
| Years | Team | Apps | (Gls) |
| 2017–2023 | KCCA FC | | |
| 2024–2025 | Express FC | 22 | (0) |
| 2025–Present | KCCA FC | | |

International career^{‡}
| 2022–Present | Uganda Cranes | 2 | (0) |
- * Club domestic league appearances and goals as of 20 August 2025 ‡ National team caps and goals as of 20 August 2025

Herbert Achayi (born 8 August 1999) is a Ugandan professional footballer who plays as a defender for KCCA FC in the Uganda Premier League and the Uganda national football team.

== Early career ==
Achayi began his football development at the KCCA FC Academy before being promoted to the senior team in 2017.

== Club career ==
=== KCCA FC (2017–2023) ===
Achayi spent six years with KCCA during his first spell, winning the 2018–19 Uganda Premier League title with the club.

=== Express FC (2024–2025) ===
In 2024, Achayi joined Express FC, making 22 appearances in the 2024–25 season and completing 1,980 minutes of play.

=== Return to KCCA FC (2025–present) ===
On 12 July 2025, KCCA announced the return of Achayi on a two-year contract. He expressed his excitement, stating: "It feels incredible to be back home... I am ready to give my all."

== International career ==
Achayi made his debut for the Uganda national football team in 2022. He was also included in the squad for the 2024 African Nations Championship (CHAN).

== Style of play ==
Achayi is a versatile defender capable of playing both as a full-back and centre-back. He is noted for his physicality, aerial strength, and tactical awareness.

== Honours ==
KCCA FC

- Uganda Premier League: 2018–19

== Career statistics ==
| Season | Club | League | Apps | Goals |
|---|---|---|---|---|
| 2024–25 | Express FC | Uganda Premier League | 22 | 0 |
