= 2000 Uganda Super League =

Football season in Uganda

Uganda Super League
- Season: 2000
- Champions: SC Villa
- Top goalscorer: Andrew Mukasa, SC Villa (27)

The 2000 Ugandan Super League was the 33rd season of the official Ugandan football championship, the top-level football league of Uganda.

== Overview ==
The 2000 Uganda Super League was contested by 16 teams and was won by SC Villa, while Nile Breweries FC, Health, UTODA (Uganda Taxi Operators and Drivers Association), Arua Municipal Council FC, Kakira Sugar Works FC and UPDF FC were relegated.

== League standings ==
Pos	Team	Pld	W	D	L	GF	GA	GD	Pts	Qualification or relegation (Note: State House FC withdrew)
1	SC Villa (C)	30	24	3	3	87	19	+68	75	Champions
2	Kampala City Council FC	30	23	1	6	76	23	+53	70	
3	Express FC	30	20	5	5	53	24	+29	65	
4	SCOUL	30	14	6	10	37	28	+9	48	
5	Military Police FC	30	13	8	9	32	32	0	47	
6	SC Simba	30	12	10	8	38	27	+11	46	
7	Mbarara United FC	30	11	13	6	45	39	+6	46	
8	Police FC	30	12	10	8	35	24	+11	46	
9	Dairy Heroes	30	12	8	10	36	41	−5	44	
10	Iganga Town Council FC	30	10	12	8	32	29	+3	42	
11	Nile Breweries FC (R)	30	9	9	12	26	44	−18	36	Relegated
12	Health (R)	30	9	7	14	34	45	−11	34	Relegated
13	UTODA (R)	30	4	11	15	29	49	−20	23	Relegated
14	Arua Municipa Council FC (R)	30	2	8	20	27	70	−43	14	Relegated
15	Kakira Sugar Works FC (R)	30	2	6	22	17	61	−44	12	Relegated
16	UPDF FC (R)	30	3	3	24	16	65	−49	12	Relegated

Source: rsssf.com
(C) Champions; (R) Relegated

== Leading goalscorer ==
The top goalscorer in the 2000 season was Andrew Mukasa of SC Villa with 27 goals.
