= Kitara F.C. =

Association football club in Uganda

Kitara
- Full name: Kitara Football Club
- Nickname: The Royals
- Founded: 2010; 16 years ago
- Stadium: Hoima City Stadium
- Capacity: 20,000
- Chairman: William Musoke
- Manager: Wasswa Bbosa
- League: Uganda Premier League
- 2025–26: 4th of 16
- Website: kitarafc.ug

Kitara Football Club, also known as The Royals, is a Ugandan professional association football club based in Hoima City. It plays among the top division of Uganda football league known as Uganda Premier League

== History ==
Kitara FC was founded in 2010 by the local communities in Bunyoro with inspiration from Kabalega.

Deo Kasozi serves as the club president. He assumed the position in July 2022, replacing Godfrey Bamwenda, who served as the club president for four years from 2018.

== Stadium ==
Kitara FC plays home matches at Royal's Park Butema.

== Supporters ==
Kitara FC fans are generally from Bunyoro region, with some other supporters across Uganda.

== Squad ==
As of October 2023

Kitara FC include some of the players on their squad.

SPlayers of Kitara FC
No	Position	Nation	Player
07	FW	UG	Jude Ssemugabi
19	FW	UG	Derrick Byabachwezi
26	DF	UG	Ibrahim Magandazi
13	MF	UG	Emmanuel Wasswa
04	MF	UG	Frank Zaga
36	FW	UG	Muhammad Shaban
12	FW	UG	Patrick Kaddu
5	DF	UG	Murushid Juuko
13	GK	UG	Chrispus Kusiima

== Honors ==
Uganda Cup

- Winners (2): 2023–2024, 2025–26

Crowned FUFA Big League Champions 2022/23
Crowned Stanbic Uganda Cup Champions 2023/24

== Records ==
- Won Kiboga Young FC 1- 0 on 21-10-2020 at FUFA Technical Centre, Njeru which led to its promotion to the Uganda Premier League
- Competed in the FUFA Big league 2019/2020 season

2020/21 season

- Kitara FC was relegated during the 2020/21 Uganda premier league season prematurely after the COVID-19 outbreak in Uganda with 13 points in 27 games played.

2022/23

- Won Kaaro Karungi FC 1- 0 on a match played at Kigaaya Primary School Ground.

2023/24 season Kitara FC entered into the new season with Head Coach Brian Ssenyondo won their first ever Uganda Cup trophy in May 2024 as they beat NEC FC 1-0 at Wankulukuku. A goal was scored by second half substitute Solomon Okwalinga in the 73rd minute. Their goalkeeper Jamil Kiyemba was voted both the Most Valuable Player and Best Goalkeeper of the entire tournament as Uganda Cup was celebrating 50 years of existence. Winning the Uganda Cup guaranteed them to book a place in the CAF Confederation Cup preliminary round marking their debut at the continent.

They finished 4th in the league with 54 points in 29 games, having won 16 games, 6 draws and 7 losses that saw them finishing just 3 points below league champions SC Villa.

== See also ==
- BUL FC
- List of football clubs in Uganda
- Uganda Premier League
- KCCA FC
