= Majid Musisi =

Ugandan footballer (1967–2005)

Magid Musisi
Personal information
- Full name: Magid Musisi
- Date of birth: 15 September 1967
- Place of birth: Kampala, Uganda
- Date of death: 13 December 2005 (aged 38)
- Place of death: Bwaise, Uganda
- Height: 1.78 m (5 ft 10 in)
- Position: Striker

Senior career*
Years	Team	Apps	(Gls)
1982–1983	Mulago		
1983–1984	Pepsi		
1985–1992	SC Villa		(138)
1992–1994	Stade Rennes	51	(28)
1994–1997	Bursaspor	77	(31)
1997–1999	Çanakkale Dardanelspor	79	(29)
1999–2001	SC Villa		
2002–2004	SHB Đà Nẵng		
2004–2005	Ggaba United		

International career^{‡}
1985–2000	Uganda	29	(20)
- * Club domestic league appearances and goals as of 17 September 2007 ‡ National team caps and goals as of 17 September 2007

Majid Musisi (sometimes spelt Magid Musisi; 15 September 1967 – 13 December 2005) was a Ugandan footballer who played as a striker. He was the first Ugandan footballer to be signed for a European club.

== Early life ==
Musisi was born to Siraje Katende and Deborah Namutebi. He attended New Mulago Primary School and Bashir High School but then dropped out of school to pursue a football career.

== Career ==
Musisi, like several other football stars from the eighties, nurtured his football career at the renowned Mulago playground, popularly known as 'Maracana' in reference to the famous Brazilian stadium. Alongside the likes of Adam Semugabi and Rajab Sekalye, he was one of the top prospects at New Mulago Primary School.

Musisi was stocky-built, powerful and endowed with speed. In 1983, at just 16 years of age, the second-tier side Pepsi FC snapped him up. In the process, Majid Musisi abandoned his studies at Bashir High School in Wandegeya.

After playing an impressive season, SC Villa's tactician, David Otti, included the youngster in the Villa squad that was preparing for the Cecafa Club Championship in January 1985.

However, Majid Musisi missed the trip when his passport was delayed but made the Villa squad that travelled to Sudan three weeks later to face El-Hilal in the Africa Club Championship. At the time, SC Villa was an emerging force with two league titles already under their belt. Rogers Nsubuga was the club's leading marksman, with Ronald Vubya and Shaban Mwinda following behind.

Under the new coach, Timothy Ayiekoh, Musisi would make his long-awaited debut against Maroons, scoring twice, then following up with one goal against Heroes.

In August 1985, Majid's career entered one of his most famous games yet, Villa versus Express. Majid Musisi, given a rare start, scored two goals in the first four minutes to give SC Villa a 2–0 win over Express.

Additionally, in the 1986 season, Polly Ouma took over the team as Villa coach. On his part, he improved his 1985 tally of six goals to eight. SC Villa won its first league and Cup double that year.

Then the goals started flowing in 1987. He scored three goals as SC Villa won the Cecafa Club Championship, and when Nsubuga got sidelined by injury, Ouma played Majid Musisi in his favoured central role, scoring eight goals in the first six league games. After this performance, Cranes coach Barnabas Mwesiga handed the 20-year-old his debut in July 1987. and Majid would play in a 1988 Olympic qualifier game against Mozambique.

With Majid Musisi partnering, Phillip Omondi on the frontline, the combo beat the Mozambique side, with each picking up a brace in the 4–1 win. In the return leg, the duo scored a goal each in the 2–0 win to make sure of Uganda's progress to the next stage. At the end of the season, Musisi was crowned the top scorer with 28 goals.

Later that year, the pair defied a Fufa directive and appeared for their Lugave clan in the Bika By'Abaganda football championship, just days before the Olympic qualifier against Zambia. So, when the federation suspended them, there was a public outcry. FUFA eventually recalled the two players and ironically, it was Musisi and Vubya who made the difference as Uganda won the home leg 2–1.

However, Zambia would go on to eliminate Uganda, but when the two teams met in the CECAFA Cup later that year, Majid Musisi beat Zambia, scoring a hat-trick, and at the end of the event, he emerged as the top scorer. Additionally, he was voted the 1987 Footballer of the Year. Patrick Kawooya, the rich SC Villa boss, was one of Musisi's biggest admirers. He rented him a plush house at Najjanankumbi, a Kampala suburb, fully furnished with a refrigerator, cooker, video system, standby generator and other luxuries.

"I remember one time Musisi came to me with a bag full of money, and we went to Kyebando where we purchased a plot of land, it was a lot of money", Majid Musisi's mother, Namutebi recollects. She says the entire family depended on Majid Musisi. "When he hit headlines, he took over the responsibility of the entire family and started paying school fees for about 12 of his siblings", she adds.

Majid Musisi and Kawooya were so close that in many ways, he [Musisi] was the go-between for other players.

"At the time, many of the upcoming Villa players like me used to channel our problems through Majid Musisi and the following day, you would get it", says Charles Sebugwawo former SC Villa player. Goals, goals, goals

Because of his well-built frame and fearless approach no defender could go with him toe to toe. Fans nicknamed him 'Tyson,' which was a direct comparison to the then young boxing heavyweight champion Mike Tyson, who also left destruction in his wake. 'Magic' is another popular tag they called him because of his style of play. In the 1988 season, however, Majid Musisi endured a dip in form and his self-belief took a hit.

Drama unfolded in the decisive league game against KCC, when Majid Musisi missed a couple of sitters and even failed to convert from the spot when the Jogoos were trailing 1–2. But when Vubya equalised with a few minutes left, Kawooya went on the touchline and usurped the powers of Geoff Hudson, Villa coach. He asked John Kaweesi to warm up in place of the misfiring Majid Musisi.

But just as they waited for a dead ball situation, Majid Musisi scored the winner in stoppage time and, ironically, Kawooya raced the full length of the pitch to carry Musisi shoulder high. At the end of the season, Majid Musisi scored a respectable 13 league goals. But that, by Majid Musisi's standards, was a step down despite missing a number of games due to an ankle injury.

Majid Musisi would later score a brace to eject KCC from the Uganda Cup before netting a spectacular goal against Express in the Uganda Cup final as Villa won the league and Cup double. A week later, he extended his act in the Bika By'Abaganda (Buganda Clans Football League, leading the Lugave clan to a 5–0 demolition of Ngabi in the final. The story was different in 1989; Musisi not only helped Villa to a third 'double' but also recaptured the top scorer's crown with 15 goals.

To cap a successful season, Majid Musisi topscored the CECAFA Cup with four goals – also converted in the final shootout as Uganda beat Malawi to win the event after 12 years. In 1990, SC Villa and Musisi remained dominant on the local scene, with the Jogoos retaining the league as Majid Musisi's 28 goals equalled Isa Sekatawa's three top-scoring awards. Earlier in September, he was a thorn in the DR Congo defence when he scored a late winner in the 2–1 triumph in a Nations Cup qualifier.

He was not done yet; in December, he put the icing on the cake as Uganda beat Sudan 2–0 to retain the CECAFA title. Unsurprisingly, he picked up a second 'Footballer of the Year' award. In 1991, he scored 17 league goals to become the first player to reach 100 league goals but Villa ended the season empty-handed.

However, they had every reason to celebrate after finishing runners-up in the Africa Club Championship. Majid Musisi scored a couple of goals in that fairytale campaign but what stood out was his diving header against Nigeria's Iwuanyanwu Nationale in the semi-final.

In 1992, Majid Musisi was on track to make light work of Jimmy Kirunda's record of 32 goals a season when he netted a mindboggling 29 goals in the league's first round. In his final league appearance, he tormented KCC goalie Sadiq Wassa to the extent that when he scored his fourth in the 5–0 win, he simply walked off the field as if to suggest that domestic opposition no longer matched his ambitions. Nevertheless, he extended his league tally to 144 goals.

It was a blessing in disguise when French side Stade Rennes signed the player for a whopping $180,000. Villa used part of that money to buy the Makindye-Luwafu club house. Simply unstoppable

Majid Musisi can best be described as an orthodox forward. He was a natural finisher who improved his physical presence. He was also a deadball specialist. On the other hand, he was known for his high work rate with firepower, dribbling skills, and aerial presence; opponents struggled with his physicality.

While many of today's strikers avoid tackles, Majid Musisi was a nightmare for man-markers. Yet despite his fearsome frame, Musisi was always composed and never lost his temper or retaliated yet many teams purposely set out to eliminate him. Professional football

At Rennes, Majid Musisi was a regular presence and scored a number of crucial goals, which prompted Turkish side Bursaspor to sign him in 1997 for a reported $1m. He later moved to Dardanelspor, another Turkish club before he brought the curtain down on his professional career in 2001. "Dardanelspor still owes him money", says Nantongo, without disclosing the amount.

[Musisi (front row second right) at Dardanelspor]

Musisi (front row second right) at Dardanelspor

Majid Musisi returned to Uganda in 2001 and rejoined SC Villa. However, it was clear he was over the hill and failed to show the predatory skills of the past. He remained a key player for Uganda, captaining the side on several occasions and the highlight was a hat-trick in 1998 in the 5–0 win over Rwanda. However, he unceremoniously ended his Cranes career when Harrison Okagbue, the then coach threw him out of camp for breaching the team's code of conduct in 2000.

In 2002, he joined Vietnamese side Da Nang but returned in 2004 and joined Ggaba United. There, he failed to get off the mark and called it a day. For all the great goals he scored, Uganda's failure to qualify for the Nations Cup somehow dented his overall greatness. In 1991, Musisi and his Villa teammates turned down a national call-up before a crucial Nations Cup qualifier against DR Congo.

After spending two seasons with the Rennes in France where he played a total of 64 matches scoring 18 goals (League 2 and Coupe de France), he was sold to the Turkish top-flight club Bursaspor and later to Çanakkale Dardanelspor for 1.8 billion Ugandan shillings transfer fee ($1 million), making a record in the transfer market for the most expensive Uganda import. In the 1996 season, he was voted Best Foreign Player of the Year in the Turkish league. After playing in Turkey he had a spell playing for Đà Nẵng in Vietnam. He founded the now famous Bursaspor crocodile walk goal celebration during the UEFA Intertoto Cup match against German side Karlsruher SC on 2 August 1995.

== Personal life ==
Magid Musisi was married to Suzan Nantongo with whom he had separated shortly before his death. Musisi fathered seven children

== Death ==
He died due to HIV/AIDS on 13 December 2005 at his mother's home in Bwaise, a city suburb of Kampala, where he had been staying after his condition worsened. His body was transferred to his Muyenga home, from where it was taken to neighbouring Bukasa for burial at 4pm on 14 December 2005.
