= Masaka Local Council FC =

Ugandan football club

Masaka
- Full name: Masaka Local Council FC
- Ground: Masaka Recreation Ground, Masaka
- Capacity: 1,000
- League: Ugandan Super League

Masaka Local Council FC, or short Masaka, is a Ugandan football club from Masaka.

They play in the top division of Ugandan football, the Ugandan Super League.

== Stadium ==
Currently the team plays at the 1000 capacity Masaka Recreation Ground.
