= Coffee United SC =

Association football club in Uganda

- Full name: Coffee United Sports Club
- Ground: Kakira
- Chairman: John Rwakishaya
- Manager: Anthony Tumwebaze

Coffee United Sports Club, or short Coffee, is a Ugandan football club from Kakira. Coffee United Sports Club won the Ugandan Super League in 1970 and the inaugural Uganda Cup in 1971, defeating Simba FC 2-1 in the final.

They play in the Second division of Ugandan football, the Ugandan Big League.

In 1970 the team has won the Ugandan Super League.

== Honours ==
- Ugandan Super League:1970

== Club overview and history ==
- Location: The club is based in Kakira, Uganda, and was a prominent team in the Bugolobi area in the past.
- League: They currently compete in the Second division of Ugandan football, known as the Ugandan Big League.
- Nickname: The team was once nicknamed "Rest of the World"
- Notable Players: Former players include Richard Makumbi and Fred Kajoba, who later became a coach.

== Performance in CAF competitions ==
- 1971 African Cup of Champions Clubs:
- 1982 African Cup Winners' Cup

== See also ==
- Biharwe FC
- Kiira Young FC
- Proline FC
- BUL Jinja FC
- Wakiso Giants FC
