= Uganda Revenue Authority FC =

Association football club in Uganda

URA FC
- URA FC logo
- Full name: Uganda Revenue Authority Football Club
- Nickname: The Taxmen
- Founded: 1997; 29 years ago
- Ground: Nakivubo Stadium
- Capacity: 15,000
- Chairman: James Kiiza
- Head Coach: Alex Isabirye
- League: Ugandan Premier League
- 2025–26: 11th
- Website: www.urafc.co.ug
Home colours

Uganda Revenue Authority Football Club (abbreviated as URA FC) is a Ugandan football team based in the national capital Kampala. The club plays in the Ugandan Premier League and was founded in 1997. They have won the Ugandan Premier League four times and the Uganda Cup three times. On the continent, URA FC has represented Uganda seven times, six times in the CAF champions league and once in the CAF confederation Cup.

== History ==
URA merged with Lyantonde FC in 2002. URA had been excluded from the Western League. Lyantonde, cup finalists in 2000, did not raise enough money to continue playing in the Buganda Super mini-league. The parties agreed that URA would pay the registration fee and take over Lyantonde's place in the league. After promotion, the team took the URA name and began play in the Buganda mini-league.

The club's first season in the top flight was 2002. They have been one of the most successful teams in the league since their promotion, having never finished in the bottom half of the table.

== Stadium ==
URA FC used the Mehta Stadium in Lugazi as their home grounds from 2011 to 2017 when they shifted to Mandela National Stadium from 2017 to 2020. The football club also used Nakisunga Saza Grounds in Mukono as their home grounds till of recent when they returned to Mehta Stadium in Lugazi as their home grounds. The football club also once had their home grounds at the Arena of Visions at Ndejje University which had a sitting capacity of 40,000.

== Statistics and records ==
Uganda Revenue Authority FC RESULTS
10.11.23	Uganda Revenue Authority	2:2	Kitara FC	D
31.10.23	Bul FC	1:0	Uganda Revenue Authority	L
27.10.23	Maroons FC	1:1	Uganda Revenue Authority	D
21.10.23	Uganda Revenue Authority	1:0	Wakiso Giants FC	W
28.09.23	Bright Stars FC	1:1	Uganda Revenue Authority	D
22.09.23	Uganda Revenue Authority	2:0	Gaddafi FC	W
17.09.23	The Saints FC	0:0	Uganda Revenue Authority	D
27.05.23	SC Villa	0:1	Uganda Revenue Authority	w
23.05.23	Uganda Revenue Authority	4:0	Gaddafi FC	w
12.05.23	Uganda Revenue Authority	1:1	The Saints FC	D
03.05.23	Blacks Power	1:1	Uganda Revenue Authority	D
29.04.23	Uganda Revenue Authority	2:3	Maroons FC	L
22.04.23	Vipers FC	1:1	Uganda Revenue Authority	D
19.04.23	Uganda Revenue Authority	2:0	KCCA FC	W
09.04.23	Arua Hill SC	0:0	Uganda Revenue Authority	D
05.04.23	Uganda Revenue Authority	2:1	Wakiso Giants	W
01.04.23	Bright Stars FC	0:2	Uganda Revenue Authority	W
25.03.23	Uganda Revenue Authority	1:2	Kirinya Jinja FC	L
04.03.23	Bul FC	0:1	Uganda Revenue Authority	W

== Honors ==
- Uganda Premier League
  - Winners (4): 2006, 2006–07, 2008–09, 2010–11
  - Runners-up: 2012–13
- Uganda Cup
  - Winners (3): 2005, 2011–12, 2013–14
  - Runners-up: 2000, (Note: as Lyantombe FC) 2008–09, 2010–11
- Kagame Interclub Cup
  - Runners-up: 2007, 2008

== Continental competition ==
- 2006 CAF Confederation Cup
  - Preliminary round: beat World Hope 2–1 on aggregate
  - Round of 32: lost to Al-Merrikh 3–2 on aggregate
- 2007 CAF Champions League
  - Preliminary round: lost to Coton Sport 3–0 on aggregate
- 2008 CAF Champions League
  - Preliminary round: lost to ZESCO United 2–0 on aggregate
- 2010 CAF Champions League
  - Preliminary round: lost to Zanaco FC 4–1 on aggregate
- 2012 CAF Champions League
  - Preliminary round: beat Lesotho Correctional Services 3–0 on aggregate
  - First round: lost on walkover to Djoliba AC after not traveling to Mali due to 2012 Malian coup d'état; lost first leg 2–0
- 2013 CAF Champions League
  - Preliminary round: lost to Coton Sport on penalties
- 2015 CAF Confederation Cup
  - Preliminary round: beat ASSM Elgeco Plus 4–2 on aggregate
  - First round: lost to Orlando Pirates 4–3 on aggregate

== Current squad ==
Note: Flags indicate national team as defined under FIFA eligibility rules; some limited exceptions apply. Players may hold more than one non-FIFA nationality.

No.	Pos.	Nation	Player
—	GK	UGA	Alionzi Nafian Legason
—	GK	UGA	Ssebalunyo Hannington
—	GK	UGA	Alitho James
—	DF	UGA	Nyakoojo Benjamin
—	DF	UGA	Mbowa Paul Patrick
—	DF	UGA	Mutyaba Julius
—	DF	UGA	Mugalu Allan Lyazi
—	DF	UGA	Kigongo Ronald
—	DF	UGA	Munaaba Allan
—	DF	UGA	Waibi Yeseri
—	DF	UGA	Nyanzi Abdullah
—	MF	UGA	Mulikyi Hudu
—	MF	UGA	Ssentamu Siraje
—	MF	UGA	Kagimu Shafiq

No.	Pos.	Nation	Player
—	MF	UGA	Munguchi Steven
—	MF	UGA	Saidi Kyeyune
—	MF	UGA	Musana Ronald
—	MF	UGA	Sseruyidde Moses
—	MF	UGA	Mukoghotya Robert
—	MF	UGA	Odongo Mathew Tayo
—	MF	UGA	Abdul Malik Vitalis Tabu
—	MF	UGA	Omonuk Robert
—	FW	UGA	Kawandwa Joshau
—	FW	UGA	Joackim Ojera
—	FW	UGA	Lwasa Peter
—	FW	UGA	Sempa Charles

== Non playing staff ==
Technical Team hierarchy.

- Head Coach: Alex Isabirye
- First Assistant Coach: Baker Ssenabulya K
- Second Assistant Coach: KasuleKasule
- Third Assistant Coach:Crespo Asiku
- Fitness Coach: IIic Milos
- Strength and conditioning Coach: Byron Okuba
- Goal keeping Coach: Jamir Damba
- Team Doctor: Joseph Lubega
- Team Physio: Isaac Ngondwe
- Kits Manager: Luggya Ronald
- Assistant Kits Manager: Bosco Otim

== See also ==
- Express FC
- Kampala Capital City Authority FC
- SC Villa
- Bright Stars FC
- Vipers SC
- BUL Jinja FC
- Busoga United FC
- Muteesa II Wankulukuku Stadium
- Ugandan Premier League
