= Maroons FC =

Association football club in Uganda

- Full name: Maroons Football Club
- Nickname: Mbili Mbili
- Short name: MFC
- Founded: 1965; 61 years ago
- Ground: Luzira Maximum Security Prison, Kampala
- Capacity: 5,000
- Chairman: Gerald Ntege
- Manager: Ayieko Charles Lukula
- League: Uganda Premier League
- 2025–26: 8th
- Website: https://maroonsfc.co.ug

Maroons FC, also known as Prisons FC, is a Ugandan professional football club from Kampala owned by Uganda Prisons Service, currently playing in the Uganda Premier League. Playing as Prisons FC, the club won the first two Ugandan Super League championships in 1968 and 1969 and made the quarterfinals of the 1970 African Cup of Champions Clubs, losing 6–2 on aggregate to Egypt's Ismaily.

== History ==
Prisons FC won the first two Ugandan Super League titles in 1968 and 1969, and were the first team to represent Uganda in international competition in the 1970 African Cup of Champions Clubs (a Ugandan team, Bitumastic, qualified in 1967 but withdrew before playing a match.)

The club declined during the 1980s and suffered their first relegation in 1987.

They were champions of the second division of Ugandan football, the Ugandan Big League, three times in the 2010s, gaining promotion to the Ugandan Premier League each time, including the 2015/16 and 2017/18 football seasons.

Maroons were relegated again during the 2020 season after the Uganda federation halted play after 25 games, but were promoted again in 2022.

In 2006, Maroons Football Club made it to the finals of the Kampala Zonal Mini League. The team was under the guidance of Coach Mole Bwekwaso and Ntege Patrick, who is currently the manager of the Uganda National team. Despite months of preparation and moulding, Maroons unfortunately lost in the initial stages and did not progress to the next round. After the Zonal Mini League, Asaph Mwebaze immediately assumed the position of head coach during the annual inter-forces games. Prisons ended up as the runners-up in the tournament after delivering a captivating sporting performance.

A year later, Asaph Mwebaze assembled a team from the vicinity of Luzira barracks. They were celebrated when they emerged victorious.

The year 2007 marked a significant milestone in the club's history. Maroons Football Club successfully returned to the Ugandan Premier League after a hiatus of 23 years from top-division football. This achievement was sealed when Maroons outperformed Mutundwe Lions, a club owned by current FUFA President Eng. Moses Magogo, in the Kampala Zonal Mini League final held at Nakivubo Stadium. Under the guidance of Coach Asaph Mwebaze and led by Captain Cemari James, Maroons proved their mettle and secured their long-awaited promotion.

== Stadium ==
The club currently hosts its games at the Luzira Prisons Stadium with a capacity of over 5000 supporters located within the Luzira Prisons Complex.

== Statistics and records ==
MAROONS FC RESULTS
01.11.23 16:00	Airtel Kitara	0:1	Maroons FC	W
27.10.23 14:00	Maroons FC	1:1	Uganda Revenue Authority	D
20.10.23 16:00	Bul FC	3:0	Maroons FC	L
03.10.23 18:30	KCCA FC	1:2	Maroons FC	W
24.09.23 15:00	Maroons FC	1:1	SC Villa JOGOO	D
17.09.23 15:00	Wakiso Giants FC	0:3	Maroons FC	W
27.05.23 15:00	Maroons FC	0:0	Bul FC	D
19.05.23 16:00	Express Football Club	2:0	Maroons FC	L
16.05.23 16:00	Maroons FC	1:0	Onduparaka FC	W
09.05.23 16:00	Gaddafi	0:0	Maroons FC	D
03.05.23 16:00	Maroons FC	1:0	SC Villa JOGOO	W
29.04.23 14:00	Uganda Revenue Authority	2:3	Maroons FC	W
25.04.23 16:00	Maroons FC	1:0	UPDF FC	W
18.04.23 16:00	Blacks Power	1:0	Maroons FC	L
05.04.23 16:00	Maroons FC	2:2	Vipers SC	D
01.04.23 16:00	KCCA FC	1:1	Maroons FC	D
21.03.23 16:00	Maroons FC	2:0	Arua Hill	W
03.03.23 16:00	Wakiso Giants FC	1:2	Maroons FC	W
24.02.23 16:00	Maroons FC	0:0	Bright Stars FC	D
09.02.23 16:00	Busoga United	0:1	Maroons FC	W

== Honors ==
- Ugandan Super League Champion (2): 1968, 1969
- FUFA Big League Champion (3): 2010, 2015, 2017

== Performance in CAF competitions ==
- African Cup of Champions Clubs: 1 appearance 1970 – Quarter-finals

== Current squad ==
This is the current squad of 2023. Note: Flags indicate national team as defined under FIFA eligibility rules; some limited exceptions apply. Players may hold more than one non-FIFA nationality.

No.	Pos.	Nation	Player
13	FW	UGA	David Ndihabwe
14	GK	UGA	Akol Emmanuel
22	DF	UGA	Dennis Rukundo
26	FW	UGA	Pius Obuya

== Non-playing staff ==
=== Technical team hierarchy ===
Position Name

- Head Coach: (Uganda) Charles Ayeikoh Lukula
- Assistant Coach: (Uganda) Ndifuna Eric
- Goalkeeping Coach: (Uganda) Sadiq Waswa
- Fitness Trainer: (Uganda) Tabula Abubaker
- Head Coach U17: (Uganda) Ssida Alex
- Second Assistant Head Coach Maroons Academy: (Uganda) Ssenfuma Mohammed
- Assistant Coach U17: (Uganda) Ojuka Simon Peter
- Head Coach U20 & Assistant Fitness Trainer: (Uganda) Ikidu Stephen
- Head Coach U14 & U12: (Uganda) Kyemali James
- Assistant Goalkeeping Coach: (Uganda) Tezigwa Ken Rogers
- Kits Manager: (Uganda) Justin

== See also ==
- Express FC
- Kampala Capital City Authority FC
- SC Villa
- Uganda Revenue Authority SC
- Vipers SC
- BUL Jinja FC
- Busoga United FC
- Ugandan Premier League
