= Uganda Premier League =

Ugandan association football league

- Founded: 1968; 58 years ago
- Country: Uganda
- Confederation: CAF
- Number of clubs: 18 (since 2026–27)
- Level on pyramid: 1
- Relegation to: FUFA Big League
- Domestic cup(s): Ugandan Cup; Super 8
- International cup(s): CAF Champions League; CAF Confederation Cup
- Current champions: Vipers (8th title) (2025–26)
- Most championships: SC Villa (17 titles)
- Top scorer: Majid Musisi (113 goals)
- Broadcasters: FUFA TV; Sanyuka Prime; International: FIFA+
- Website: Tickets www.upl.co.ug
- Current: 2025–26 Uganda Premier League

The Uganda Premier League, known as the StarTimes Uganda Premier League for sponsorship reasons, is a professional association football league in Uganda and the highest level of the Ugandan football league system. Contested by 18 clubs, it operates on a system of promotion and relegation with the Federation of Uganda Football Associations (FUFA). Seasons usually run from August to May, with each team playing 34 matches: two against each other team, one home and one away. Most games are played on weekday afternoons, with occasional weekend evening fixtures.

The league was previously known as the Uganda Super League but changed in the 2014–15 season after new management taking over. The league's roots date back to 1968 when the National First Division League was established.

== History ==
=== Original concept ===
The genesis of club football in Uganda was an idea copied from England by Balamaze Lwanga and Polycarp Kakooza. The objective was to improve Uganda's performances in the Africa Cup of Nations after disappointing results in the finals in 1962 (fourth-place finish) and 1968 (lost all three group stage matches), both held in Ethiopia. The intention was to start a Uganda National League (the forerunner of the Uganda Super League) to create the foundation for a strong national team. At the same time, the identification of players from the grassroots would be made easier and systematic.

Because there were no clubs to form a league, institutions and districts were contacted to form teams. The 1968 inaugural top-flight league was composed of Prisons, Army, Coffee, Express, Jinja, Masaka, Mbarara, and Mbale. There were three institutions and four districts and one club. The league was known as the National First Division League, and the first league champions were Prisons FC Kampala (now known as Maroons).

After four seasons, the political turbulence in Uganda impacted on the league. The 1972 and 1973 championships were not completed because of civil unrest. In 1974, the league became known as the National Football League and this title was used until 1982 when the league was trimmed to ten teams and was renamed the Super League (shortened to Super Ten in that inaugural season).

=== Super League advent ===
The emergence of the Super League in 1982 saw the development of SC Villa as the country's leading club. Through the 1980s and a good part of the 1990s, competition between Express, KCC FC and SC Villa lit up the league and fans attended in hoards.

SC Villa won the league for the first time in 1982 and over the next 22 years totalled 16 league titles. KCC FC and Express won the championship title in the intervening years.

=== Match-fixing ===
In 2003, football in Uganda hit its lowest ebb as SC Villa put 22 goals past Akol FC when the league title went down to goal difference with Express. This was one of the biggest scandals in Ugandan football and thereafter, there was a complete media shutdown in all matters pertaining to local football. Fans became increasingly disillusioned and deserted the stadia thus affecting the teams financially. The episode represented one of many that has plagued Ugandan football.

== Clubs ==
=== Champions ===
Club	Previous names	Settlement	Titles	Championship Seasons
Villa	Nakivubo Boys; Nakivubo Villa	Kampala	17	1982, 1984, 1986, 1987, 1988, 1989, 1990, 1992, 1994, 1998, 1999, 2000, 2001, 2002, 2002–03, 2004, 2023–24
KCCA	Kampala City Council	Kampala	13	1976, 1977, 1981, 1983, 1985, 1991, 1997, 2007–08, 2012–13, 2013–14, 2015–16, 2016–17, 2018–19
Vipers	Bunamwaya SC	Wakiso	8	2009–10, 2014–15, 2017–18, 2019–20, 2021–22, 2022–23, 2024-25, 2025–26
Express	Express Red Eagles	Kampala	7	1974, 1975, 1993, 1995, 1996, 2011–12, 2020–21
Uganda Revenue Authority	—	Kampala	4	2006, 2006–07, 2008–09, 2010–11
Maroons	Prisons	Kampala	2	1968–69, 1969
Simba	Army	Lugazi	2	1971, 1978
Coffee United	—	Kakira	1	1970
Nile Breweries	—	Jinja	1	1980
Police	—	Jinja	1	2005
Uganda Commercial Bank	—	Kampala	1	1979

== Top scorers ==
Year	Top scorers	Team	Goals
1968–69	John Owubwe	Simba	
1969	Ali Kitonsa	Express	36
1970	Erickson Matega	Express	
1971	Polly Ouma	Simba	18
1972	Paschal Luwagga	Express	
1973	Joy Ssebuliba	Lint FC	17*
1974	Peter Kirumira	Express	14
1975	Chris Ddungu	KCC FC	12
1976	John Ntesibe	Express	22
1977	Denis Obua	Uganda Police FC	24
1978	Jimmy Kirunda	KCC FC	32
1979	Davis Kamoga	KCC FC	18
1980	Davis Kamoga	KCC FC	21
1981	Issa Ssekatawa	Nytil FC	18
1982	Issa Ssekatawa	Express	22
1983	Issa Ssekatawa	Express	21
1984	Frank Kyazze	KCC FC	18
1985	Frank Kyazze	KCC FC	28
1986	Charles Letti	Tobacco FC	29
1987	Majid Musisi	SC Villa	28
1988	Mathias Kaweesa	Nsambya FC	17
1989	Majid Musisi	SC Villa	15
1990	Majid Musisi	SC Villa	28
1991	Mathias Kaweesa	Coffee United	18
1992	Majid Musisi	SC Villa	29
1993	Mathias Kaweesa	SC Villa	20
1994	Adolf Bora	Coffee United	21
1995	Ibrahim Kizito	Uganda Electricity Board FC	20
1996	David Kiwanuka	Uganda Electricity Board FC	21
1997	Jackson Mayanja; Charles Ogwang	KCC FC; Umeme FC	18
1998	Charles Kayemba	SC Villa	18
1999	Andrew Mukasa	SC Villa	45
2000	Andrew Mukasa	SC Villa	27

Year	Top scorers	Team	Goals
2001	Hassan Mubiru	Express	24
2002	Hassan Mubiru	Express	22
2002–03	Hassan Mubiru	Express	16
2004	Osborn Mundia	Kinyara FC	13
2005	Martin Muwanga; Geoffrey Sserunkuma	Police; KCC FC	8
2006	Dan Walusimbi	Police	15
2006–07	Hamis Kitagenda	Uganda Revenue Authority SC	20
2007–08	Brian Umony; Olobo Bruno	KCC FC; Police	15
2008–09	Peter Ssenyonjo	Police	22
2009–10	Tony Odur	Bunamwya	21
2010–11	Diego Hamis Kiiza	Uganda Revenue Authority SC	14
2011–12	Robert Ssentongo	Uganda Revenue Authority SC	13
2012–13	Herman Wasswa	SC Villa and KCC FC	20
2013–14	Tony Odur; Francis Solaki	KCC; Soana FC	15
2014–15	Robert Ssentongo	Uganda Revenue Authority SC	15
2015–16	Robert Ssentongo	Uganda Revenue Authority SC	18
2016–17	Geoffrey Sserunkuma	KCCA FC	20
2017–18	Dan Sserunkuma	Vipers	17
2018–19	Juma Balinya	Police	19
2019–20	Steven Mukwala	Maroons	13
2020–21	Yunus Sentamu	Vipers	16
2021–22	Cesar Manzoki	Vipers	18
2022–23	Allan Kawiya	Express	13
2023–24	Muhammad Shaban	Kampala City	17
2024–25	Allan Okello	Vipers	19
2025–26	Ivan Ahimbisibwe	KCCA	14

Notes:

- Joy Ssebuliba was leading league scorer with 17 goals for Lint FC in 1973 but the league was not completed because of the dire political situation.

== Multiple hat-tricks ==
Rank	Country	Player	Hat-tricks
1	(Uganda)	Olobo Bruno	3
2	(Uganda)	Emmanuel Okwi	2
2	(Uganda)	Peter Ssenyonjo	2
3	(Uganda)	Moses Aduni	1
3	(Uganda)	Oscar Kadenge	1
3	(Uganda)	David Kalungi	1
3	(Uganda)	Ismael Kigosi	1
3	(Uganda)	Hamis Kitagenda	1
3	(Uganda)	Hisborne Mundia	1
3	(Uganda)	Andrew Nkurunungi	1
3	(Uganda)	Augustine Nsumba	1
3	(Uganda)	Tony Odur	1
3	(Uganda)	Cesar Okhuti	1
3	(Uganda)	Denis Ojara	1
3	(Uganda)	Allan Okello	1
3	(Uganda)	Brian Omwony	1
3	(Uganda)	Denis Onyango	1

== Sponsorship ==
Period	Sponsor	Brand
1998–2003	Nile Breweries Limited	Nile Special Super League
2003–2005	TOP Radio	TOP Radio Super League
2005–2013	Bell Lager	Bell Lager Super League
2013–2014	Airtel Uganda	Airtel Uganda Super League
2014–2015	Airtel Uganda	Airtel Uganda Premier League
2015–2018	Azam TV	Azam TV Uganda Premier League
2018–present	StarTimes	StarTimes Uganda Premier League

== Qualification for CAF competitions ==
=== Association ranking for the 2025–26 CAF club season ===
The association ranking for the 2025–26 CAF Champions League and the 2025–26 CAF Confederation Cup will be based on results from each CAF club competition from 2020–21 to the 2024–25 season.

Legend

- CL: CAF Champions League
- CC: CAF Confederation Cup
- ≥: Associations points might increase on basis of its clubs performance in 2024–25 CAF club competitions
- Associations ranked 1–12 are eligible to enter two teams in each CAF club competition.

Rank			Association	2020–21 (× 1)		2021–22 (× 2)		2022–23 (× 3)		2023–24 (× 4)		2024–25 (× 5)		Total
2025	2024	Mvt	Association	CL	CC	CL	CC	CL	CC	CL	CC	CL	CC	Total
1	1	—	Egypt	8	3	7	4	8	2.5	7	7	10	4	190.5
2	2	—	Morocco	4	6	9	5	8	2	2	4	5	5	142
3	4	+1	South Africa	8	2	5	4	4	3	4	1.5	9	3	131
4	3	-1	Algeria	6	5	7	1	6	5	2	3	5	5	130
5	6	+1	Tanzania	3	0.5	0	2	3	4	6	0	2	4	82.5
6	5	-1	Tunisia	4	3	5	1	4	2	6	1	3	0.5	82.5
7	8	+1	Angola	1	0	5	0	2	0	3	1.5	2	2	55
8	7	-1	DR Congo	4	0	0	3	1	2	4	0	2	0	45
9	9	—	Sudan	3	0	3	0	3	0	2	0	3	0	41
10	11	+1	Ivory Coast	0	0	0	1	0	3	3	0	1	2	38
11	10	-1	Libya	0	0.5	0	5	0	0.5	0	3	0	0	24
12	12	—	Nigeria	0	2	0	0	0	2	0	2	0	1	21
13	15	+2	Mali	0	0	0	0	0	1	0	2	1	0.5	18.5
14	14	—	Ghana	0	0	0	0	0	0	1	3	0	0	16
15	13	-2	Guinea	2	0	1	0	2	0	0	0.5	0	0	12
16	19	+3	Botswana	0	0	1	0	0	0	1	0	0	0.5	8.5
17	21	+4	Senegal	1	2	0	0	0	0	0	0	0	1	8
18	17	-1	Mauritania	0	0	0	0	0	0	2	0	0	0	8
19	18	-1	Congo	0	0	0	1	0	1	0	0.5	0	0	7
20	16	-4	Cameroon	0	3	0	0.5	1	0	0	0	0	0	7
21	22	+1	Togo	0	0	0	0	0	1	0	0	0	0	3
22	22	—	Uganda	0	0	0	0	1	0	0	0	0	0	3
23	-	new	Mozambique	0	0	0	0	0	0	0	0	0	0.5	2.5
24	20	-4	Zambia	0	1.5	0	0.5	0	0	0	0	0	0	2.5
25	24	-1	Eswatini	0	0	0	0.5	0	0	0	0	0	0	1
25	24	-1	Niger	0	0	0	0.5	0	0	0	0	0	0	1
27	26	-1	Burkina Faso	0	0.5	0	0	0	0	0	0	0	0	0.5

== See also ==
- Federation of Uganda Football Associations
