= Police FC (Uganda) =

Association football club in Uganda

- Police FC logo
- Full name: Police Football Club
- Nickname: The Cops
- Founded: 1965
- Ground: Star Times Stadium; Kampala, Uganda
- Capacity: 3,000
- Chairman: SCP Timothy Halango
- Manager: Abdallah Mubiru
- League: Ugandan Premier League
- 2025–26: 7th
Home colours

Police FC is an association football club from Kampala in Uganda. It was formed in 1965 as the representative team of the Uganda Police Force with a mission, "To be a football club that upholds community values and promote carrier development as community policing tool to avert criminality in the society".

== History ==
Police were first promoted to the top flight of Ugandan football in 1969. In 1970, they were beaten by Coffee FC by a single point. Later in the 70s, most of their team moved to Army FC and in 1976, 4 Police players died in a coach crash. As a result, they were relegated that season and not promoted back to the top flight until 1996. They won their first Ugandan league title in 2005 and the CECAFA Clubs Cup in 2006. When Dennis Obua, formerly a Police player became the Federation of Uganda Football Association president, he hired Steven Mulinde to replace him. As of November 2019, the main stadium for Police FC is the Star Times Stadium. Located in the area of Lugogo. On 25 September 2020, Tonny Mawejje was introduced as the captain for Police FC. In 2022, Police were relegated again. In 2024, they were promoted back into the Uganda Premier League after winning the FUFA Big League. They often represent Uganda in the Inter-Forces Games

== Stadium ==
Police FC is currently constructing their new home stadium in Kiira Road Kampala and they hope to finish its construction by the second round of the 2023/2024 season. The facility shall also have a track lane for athletics and a football pitch. Due to a number of delays, Police FC announced in 2025 that they were starting phase two of the construction.

== Achievements ==
- Ugandan Premier League: 1
  - 2005
- CECAFA Clubs Cup: 1
  - 2006

== Playing squad ==
No.	Pos.	Nation	Player
—	GK	UGA	Oloka Sammon
—	GK	UGA	Tom Ikara
—	GK	UGA	Derrick Ochan
—	GK	UGA	Alfred Ochan
—	MF	UGA	Duncan Seninde Ezekiel
—	MF	UGA	Tonny Mawejje
—	FW	UGA	Juma Balinya
—	FW	UGA	Herman Wasswa Nteza

== Non playing Staff ==
The following are the coaching and executive:

- Head coach: Simon Peter Mugerwa
- 1st Assistant coach: Robert Sekweyama
- 2nd Assistant coach: Nestroy Kizito
- Goalkeepers’ coach: Ben Kalama
- Fitness coach: Fazil Ibrahim
- Doctor: Kennedy Kukundakwe
- Physiotherapist: Senyondo Muhamood
- Chairman: Senior Commissioner of Police (SCP) Timothy Halango
- Vice chairman: Livingstone Lajan
- Chief Executive Officer (CEO): PK Arinaitwe
- Board members: Assistant Commissioner of Police (ACP) Abu Kalule, ACP Hilary Kulayigye, ACP Claire Nabakka, Sandra Nsaire
- Media officer: Abdusalam Kigozi
- Public Relations Officer (PRO): Assistant Commissioner of Police (ACP) Claire Nabakka

== See also ==
- Express FC
- Kampala Capital City Authority FC
- SC Villa
- Uganda Revenue Authority SC
- Vipers SC
- BUL Jinja FC
- Busoga United FC
- Muteesa II Wankulukuku Stadium
- Ugandan Premier League
