= UPDF FC =

Association football club in Uganda

- Full name: UPDF Football Club
- Nickname: The Lion Army
- Founded: 1968; 58 years ago
- Ground: Bombo military stadium Lugazi, Uganda
- Capacity: 15,000
- Chairman: Brig. Gen. Roger Nsubuga
- Manager: Moses Basena
- League: Ugandan Premier League
- 2024/25: 10th
Home colours

Uganda Peoples’ Defence Force Football Club (commonly known as UPDF FC) is a Ugandan professional football club based in Bombo, Luweero District. The club currently plays in the Uganda Premier League, the country’s top division.

UPDF FC has played in many leagues since 1980 but as Simba FC.

== History ==
The club traces its roots to the famous Simba FC, the original army team founded in 1968, which won the Uganda Super League twice (1971 and 1978) and reached the 1972 African Cup of Champions Clubs final.

In 2016, the army acquired "The Saints FC", a club playing in the Uganda Premier League, and rebranded it as UPDF FC in 2017 following FUFA approval.

== Crest ==
Old logo

== Ownership and management ==
The club is owned and operated by the Uganda People’s Defence Force. Management and funding are overseen by the army, while the day-to-day football operations are handled by a professional technical team. As of 2024, the head coach is Moses Basena, a former coach of the Uganda national football team.

== Performance ==
UPDF FC has been a mid-table team in recent seasons. In the 2020–21 Uganda Premier League, they finished 8th in their comeback season. In 2023–24, the club finished 12th out of 16 teams, narrowly avoiding relegation.

=== Season-by-season record ===
Season	Division	Position	Notes
2019–20	Uganda Premier League	15th	Relegated
2020–21	Uganda Premier League	8th	Returned after promotion
2021–22	Uganda Premier League	11th	
2022–23	Uganda Premier League	13th	
2023–24	Uganda Premier League	12th	
2024-25	Uganda Premier League	10th	

== Honours ==
=== Continental ===
- African Cup of Champions Clubs
  - Runners-up (1): 1972

=== Domestic ===
- Ugandan Premier League
  - Champions (2): 1971, 1978
- Ugandan Cup
  - Winners (2): 1977, 2011

== Performance in CAF competitions ==
- African Cup of Champions Clubs: 4 appearances

1972: Finalist
1973: Second Round
1974: First Round
1979: First Round

- CAF Cup Winners' Cup: 2 appearances

1978 – First Round
1999 – Second Round

== Current squad ==
Confirmed squad for the 2024–25 season. Note: Flags indicate national team as defined under FIFA eligibility rules; some limited exceptions apply. Players may hold more than one non-FIFA nationality.

No.	Pos.	Nation	Player
1	GK	UGA	Yusuf Waswa
2	GK	UGA	Anyama Joseph
3	GK	UGA	Sulaiman Kibalama
4	DF	UGA	Derrick Jim Ssekulima
5	DF	UGA	Denis Ssekitoleko
6	DF	UGA	Musa Mulindwa
7	DF	UGA	Bashir Kabuye
8	DF	UGA	Aggrey Kiirya
9	DF	UGA	Christopher Kamagu
10	DF	UGA	Oscar Agaba
11	DF	UGA	Ezekiel Katende
12	DF	UGA	Abbas Luuty Nsubuga
13	DF	UGA	Henry Tenywa
14	MF	UGA	Edward Kawooya
15	MF	UGA	Ronald Kayondo
16	MF	UGA	Christopher Tebandeke
17	MF	UGA	Rashid Faridi
18	MF	UGA	Hussein Zzinda
19	MF	UGA	Shakibu Mayanja
20	MF	UGA	Enrique Lubwama
21	MF	UGA	Asaph Ssegujja
22	MF	UGA	Swaibu Kasujja Kalule
23	FW	UGA	Brian Kalumba
24	FW	UGA	Frank Mugisa
25	FW	UGA	Joseph Janjali
26	FW	UGA	Samson Kigozi
27	FW	UGA	Samuel Ssekamatte
28	FW	UGA	Emmanuel Ochen
29	FW	UGA	Daniel Kitara
30	FW	UGA	Sulaiman Kibalama

== See also ==
- Uganda Premier League
- Uganda People’s Defence Force
