= Match-fixing in Ugandan football =

Match fixing in Ugandan football has transitioned from isolated cases in the early 2000s to a sophisticated, organized criminal enterprise characterized by foreign betting syndicates in the 2020s. The Federation of Uganda Football Associations (FUFA) acknowledges that the vice involves referees, players, coaches, and club officials. FUFA has been credited with unrelentless efforts to fight this vice by using FIFA-backed systems to monitor abnormal betting patterns and applying necessary bans and suspensions to those found culpable of the vice.

== Cases ==
=== Pre 2000s & 2010s ===
Cases of bribery, corruption and manipulation were cited in Uganda football from as far back as the 1990s. A case in point was when in 1997-8 SC Villa fired 14 players on suspicion of taking bribes from KCC FC to throw a league and cup game. In 2002 Express FC was accused of attempting to bribe Iganga TC players to manipuate outcome of a match and in 2003 SC Villa were highlighted after winning a title-deciding game 22-1 against Akol FC, raising suspicions of heavy manipulation.

=== Pre 2020s ===
In June 2015 a Uganda Cup final between SC Villa and KCC FC match was abandoned following controversial refereeing decisions and allegations of match fixing. SC Villa won the replay 3-0 weeks later.

In 2016 SC Villa, URA FC, and Police FC, all suspended players for alleged match fixing. SC Villa banned five players in May, URA FC suspended players Fahad Kawooya and Oscar Agaba in November, while Police FC followed with the dismissal of Godfrey Kateregga and Saddat Kyambadde in December.

In 2019, Ugandan coach Paul Nkata was suspended - and later dismissed - by Kenyan club Kakamega Homeboyz for suspected match fixing. At the same time Ugandan player George Mandela in the same team was banned for life by FIFA while another three kenyan players were handed four-year bans.

=== Post 2020's ===
In December 2020, FUFA banned referee John Bosco Kalibbala for 15 years after being found guilty of receiving financial gain in return for influencing the outcome of matches between Tooro United v UPDF played on 30th November 2021, and Gaddafi FC Vs Onduparaka FC played on 21st December 2021.

In April 2021, Uganda Premier League side Kyetume FC suspended three players - goalkeeper Joel Mutakubwa, defender Julius Ntambi, and team captain Mustafa Mujjuzi - indefinitely following match-fixing allegations after a 4-2 loss to Kitara FC.

In March 2022, FUFA sanctioned three individuals, including former Police FC Sales and Marketing chief Abraham Luzzi, coach James Kaweesa, and sports journalist David Isabirye, following investigations into alleged match-fixing activities. Luzzi was handed a ten-year ban, Kaweesa 15-years, and Isabirye a two-year ban.

In August 2023, Uganda scored a first in its fight against match manipulation after passing of the National Sports Act by parliament which allowed prosecution of those behind the vice.Arrival of the law came months after an elaborate match fixing campaign had been initiated by FUFA.

In May 2024, Fufa suspended two referees - Deogracious Opio, and George Nkurunziza, and six players including Gaddafi FC pair of Andrew Waiswa and Kakooza Yaya Mahad, Kitara's Godfrey Lwesibawa, Saleh Maganda of Calvary FC, Franco Oringa of Northern Gateway FC, and Abdallah Mwima from Ndejje University FC.

In June 2024, FUFA extended worldwide bans to 13 individuals—including 10 referees, a player Latif Kiyemba, and two administrators after successfully uncovering a South African-based match-fixing syndicate with the help of Fifa.

The operation is said to have been led by one Hilfiger Mutyaba alias Chelsea, an ex-convict, and other local criminal elements who later recruited referee Kaddu Ali to onboard club officials for the mission on behalf of match fixers. As part of this match-fixing scheme, FUFA investigations identified at least seven matches were targeted for manipulation by the match-fixing syndicate between October and December 2023. They included two matches involving women teams - Rines SS WFC Vs Kawempe Muslim Ladies FC, and Asubo Gafford Ladies FC Vs She Maroons FC - confirming the vice cuts across all gendre leagues.

The bans followed on five-year global suspensions by FIFA on seven Uganda individuals - five players, including three from top-flight side Gaddafi FC, and 10-year suspensions to two referees. The seven had been suspended by FUFA in 2023 for engaging in match manipulation.

In January 2026, the Federation of Uganda Football Associations (FUFA) launched an investigation into alleged match-fixing involving players from Buhimba United Saints FC, relating to a Uganda Premier League match against Lugazi FC played on 8 November 2025. Three players - Moses Ayebale, Dudu Ramathan, and Fred Nkata - were provisionally suspended for 90 days pending investigations into suspected betting-related manipulation.

In March 2026, FUFA provisionally suspended five individuals over alleged involvement in a match-fixing scheme linked to a Uganda Premier League fixture between Kitara FC and Express FC played on 21 December 2024. According to alerts, Express FC was to lose by at least five goals. They lost 7-0. The five included former Uganda national football team midfielder Mike Mutyaba, Express FC CEO Ashraf Miiro, goalkeeper Emmanuel Kalyowa, Ashraf Mbazira and Ivan Katende.
