= Sula Kato =

Personal information
- Full name: Sula Kato
- Date of birth: 24 December 1968 (age 57)
- Place of birth: Masaka District, Uganda
- Position: Left winger

Senior career*
Years	Team	Apps	(Gls)
1982	Millers FC		
1982–1984	Masaka Union		
1984–1994	SC Villa		
1994–1996	Villa International		
1996–1998	Pamba FC		
1998–2000	Young Africans		
2001	Simba FC		

International career
1988–1994	Uganda		

Managerial career
- 2008–2010: SC Villa
- * Club domestic league appearances and goals

Sula Kato (born 24 December 1968) is a Ugandan former footballer and coach.

== Early life and education background ==
Kato was born on 24 December 1968 in Masaka District, Uganda to late Ssalongo Zakaria Lubega and the Late Mariam Nantumbwe of Kirumba. Kato began his education at Kimanya Primary School before going to Hill Road Primary School and 1977 he joined Kako Primary School, where he completed his primary education. He attended Masaka Secondary School and St. Henry's College Kitovu for secondary education.

== Playing career ==
Kato began his football journey in Jinja with Millers FC in 1982, where he obtained his first club licence while playing in the first division. In the same year he moved to Masaka Union where he was until 1984. In 1984, Kato joined SC Villa from Masaka Union and was on this until 1994 to join Villa International, where he played until 1996.

After leaving Villa International in 1996, Kato moved abroad and played for Pamba FC until 1998 before joining Young Africans (Yanga) in Tanzania and he remained with the club until 2000. He returned to Uganda in 2001, joining Simba FC, where he played briefly before ending his playing career.

Kato also played for Uganda Cranes and was first called up to the Uganda Cranes in 1987 by coach Robert Kiberu but made his international debut at the 1988 CECAFA Senior Challenge Cup in Malawi and he represented Uganda until 1994.

== Coaching career ==
After retiring as a player, Kato moved into coaching. In 2008, he was appointed as the head coach of SC Villa, succeeding Asuman Lubowa. During his tenure, he guided the club to the 2009 Kakungulu Cup before leaving the club in November 2010.

== Achievements ==
Kato won six Uganda Super League titles (1986, 1988, 1989, 1990, 1992 and 1994), three Uganda Cup titles (1986, 1988 and 1989), and the CECAFA Club Championship (1987) with SC Villa.

With Uganda, Kato won the CECAFA Senior Challenge Cup twice (1989 and 1990).
