= Lwanga Charles =

Ugandan footballer

Charles Lwanga
Personal information
- Full name: Charles Lwanga
- Date of birth: 2 February 2000 (age 26)
- Position: Forward

Team information
- Current team: SC Villa
- Number: 14

Youth career
- 2016: Kirinya Soccer Academy
- 2017–2019: SC Villa Juniors

Senior career*
Years	Team	Apps	(Gls)
2019–2020	SC Villa	19	(3)
2020–2023	KCCA FC	55	(17)
2023–	SC Villa	20	(5)
- * Club domestic league appearances and goals as of August 2025

Charles Lwanga (born 2 February 2000) is a Ugandan professional footballer who plays as a forward for SC Villa in the Uganda Premier League and the Uganda national football team.

== Youth career ==
Lwanga began his youth career at Kirinya Soccer Academy in 2016 before joining SC Villa Juniors in 2017. In the 2017/18 FUFA Juniors League, he netted 33 goals and provided 21 assists in 35 matches.

== Club career ==
=== SC Villa (first spell) ===
Lwanga was promoted to SC Villa's senior team in 2019, making 19 appearances with three goals and three assists. He left the club in 2020 after lodging a complaint over unpaid dues, with the FUFA Players’ Status Committee ruling in his favour.

=== KCCA FC ===
In June 2020, Lwanga signed a four-year contract with KCCA FC. He scored 17 league goals in 55 appearances across three seasons for the club. In mid-2023, his contract was terminated by mutual consent.

=== Return to SC Villa ===
Lwanga signed again for SC Villa in August 2023 on a three-year contract. In March 2024, he scored the winning goal in the Kampala Derby against Express FC. On 1 November 2024, he netted four goals in Villa’s 5–0 victory over UPDF FC in the Uganda Premier League. His performances earned him the Fortebet Real Stars Player of the Month award in November 2024.

== Playing style ==
Lwanga is known for his pace, aggression, and versatility, capable of playing across forward positions. Early in his career, he was nicknamed "Neymar" due to his flair and attacking skills.

== Career statistics ==
Club	Season	League Apps	Goals
SC Villa	2019–20	19	3
KCCA FC	2020–23	55	17
SC Villa	2023–24	20	5

== Honours ==
- Fortebet Real Stars Player of the Month: November 2024
