= Gavin Kizito =

Ugandan footballer

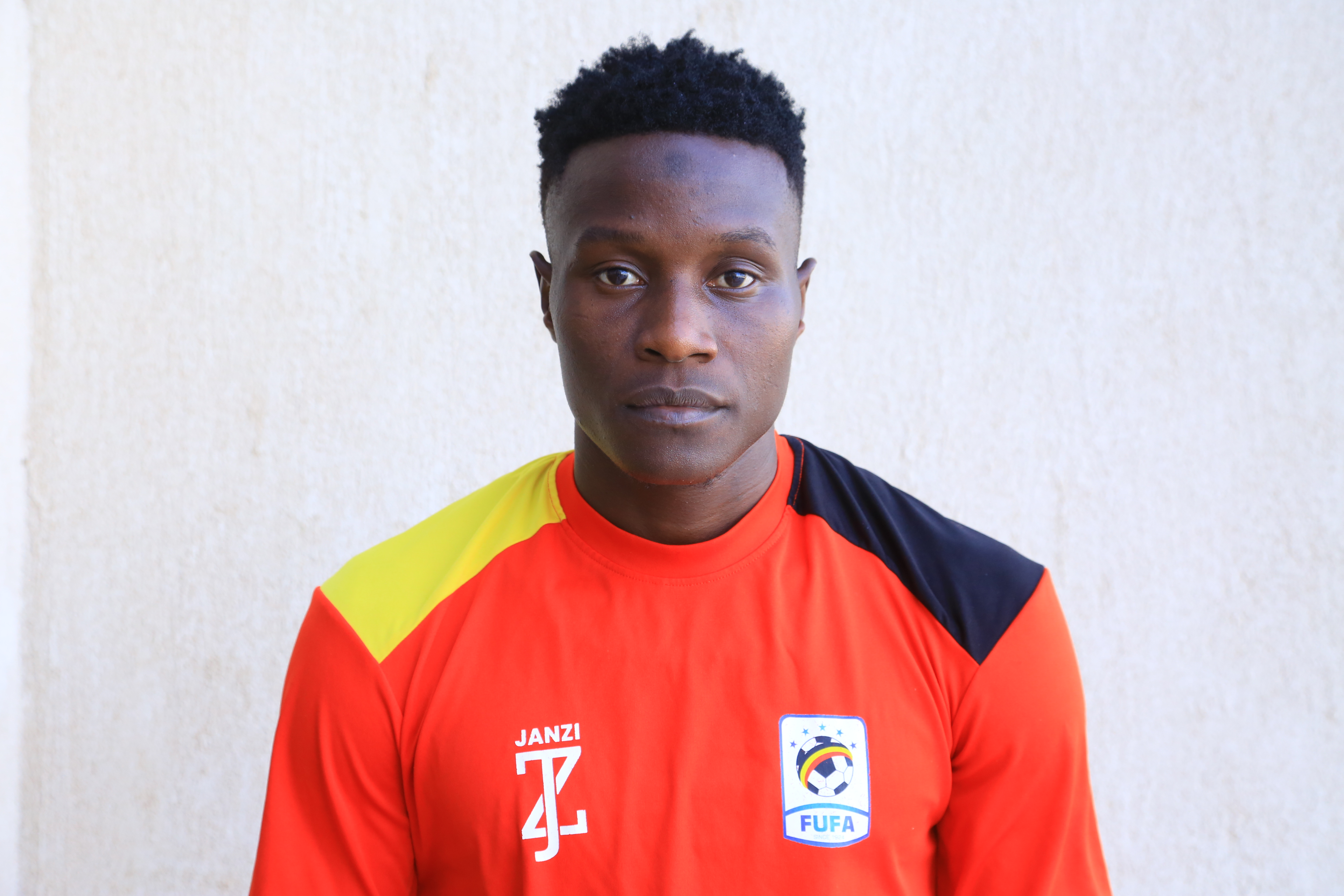
- Gavin in 2025

Personal information
- Full name: Gavin Mugweri Kizito
- Date of birth: 14 January 2002 (age 24)
- Place of birth: Kampala, Uganda
- Height: 1.73 m (5 ft 8 in)
- Position: Right back

Team information
- Current team: Nairobi United

Youth career
- Vipers SC
- SC Villa

Senior career*
Years	Team	Apps	(Gls)
2019–2022	SC Villa	53	(0)
2022–2023	Al Ittihad	3	(0)
2023–2024	SC Villa	25	(1)
2024–2026	KCCA FC		
2026-	Nairobi United		

International career^{‡}
2021–	Uganda	14	(0)
- * Club domestic league appearances and goals as of end of 2023–24 season ‡ National team caps and goals as of 01:23, 16 March 2025 (UTC)

Gavin Mugweri Kizito (born 14 January 2002) is a Ugandan footballer who plays as a right back for Kenyan Premier League club Nairobi United and the Uganda national team.

== Club career ==
Born in Kampala, Kizito attended St. Mary's secondary school, with whom he won the boys' football competition at the 2019 FEASSSA Games. After playing for Vipers SC and SC Villa's youth teams, Kizito made his Uganda Premier League debut for SC Villa during the 2019–20 season. He made 53 appearances over three seasons for SC Villa.

In October 2022, Kizito joined Egyptian club Al Ittihad on a three-year contract, but after making three appearances in the Egyptian Premier League during the 2022–23 season, Kizito had his contract terminated in July 2023.

Kizito returned to SC Villa on a three-year contract in September, and made 25 appearances, scoring once, as SC Villa won the 2023–24 Uganda Premier League. After an internal club dispute over an unpaid bonus in summer 2024, Kizito was made club captain after the previous captain Kenneth Semakula had his contract terminated, only to have his own contract terminated later that summer.

Kizito signed for fellow Uganda Premier League side KCCA FC in September 2024, on a two-year contract.

In August 2026, Kizito left KCCA FC after expiration of his contract and signed for Kenyan Premier League club Nairobi United.

== International career ==
As a youth international, Kizito captained both the Uganda under-17 and under-20 teams, including at the 2021 U-20 Africa Cup of Nations where Uganda were beaten finalists, and has also played for Uganda under-23s. Kizito made his debut for the senior international team as a substitute in a 1–0 defeat to Malawi in March 2021.

== Style of play ==
Kizito can play as both a centre back and a right back.

== Honours ==
SC Villa

- Uganda Premier League: 2023–24

Uganda U20

- U-20 Africa Cup of Nations runners-up: 2021

== See also ==
- Sc Villa
- Uganda Premier League
- AL Itihad
