= Morley Byekwaso =

Ugandan football coach

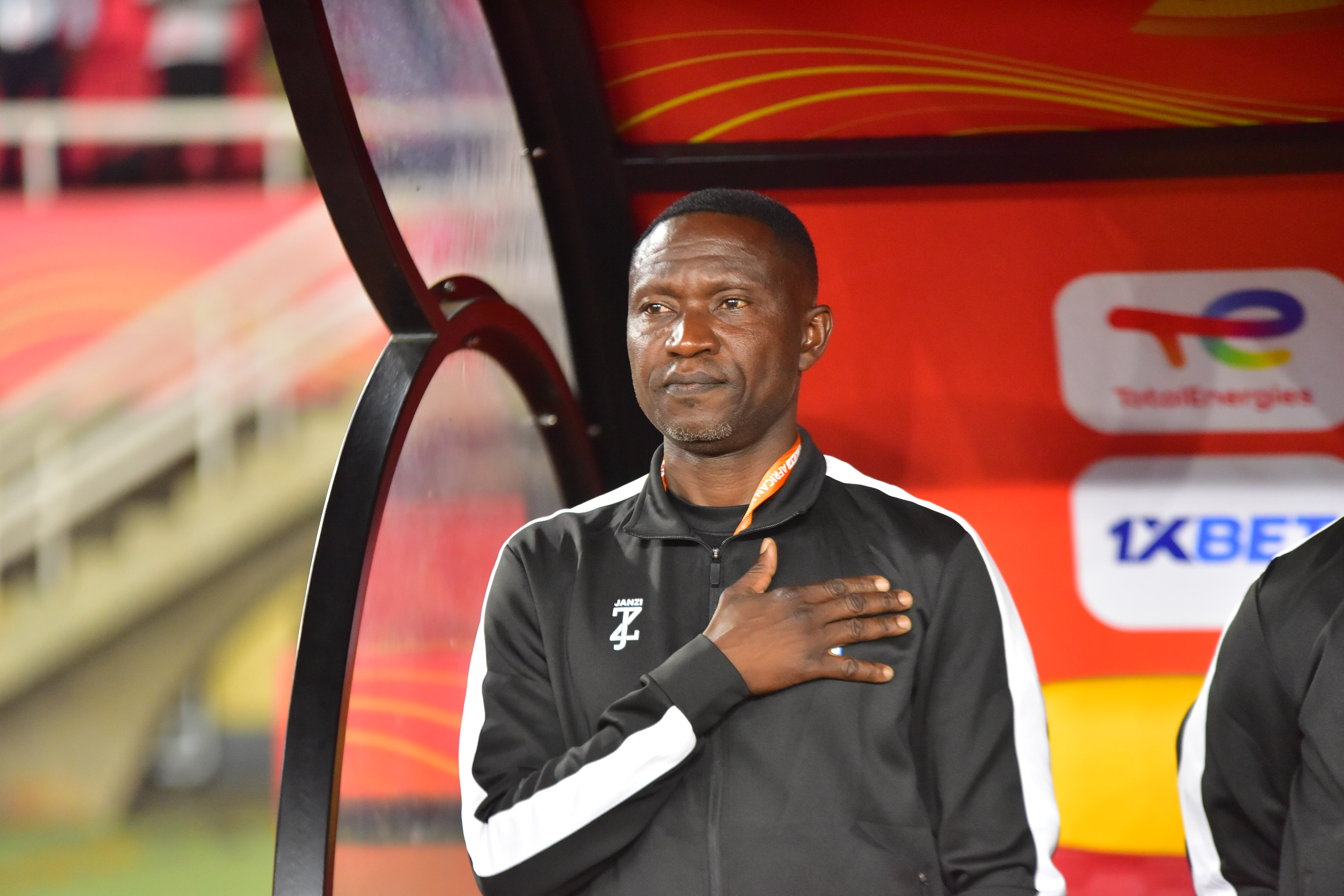
- Morley Byekwaso, Uganda Cranes head coach for 2024 CHAN

Personal information
- Date of birth: 30 November 1976 (age 49)
- Place of birth: Luzira Uganda

Team information
- Current team: SC Villa (manager)

Managerial career
- Years: Team
- 2024-: SC Villa
- 2023–2023: Uganda (Interim Coach)
- 2019–2021: Uganda (U-20 Uganda Hippos)
- 2021–2022: KCCA FC
- 2016–2021: KCCA FC (Assistant Manager)
- 2015–2016: Uganda (Assistant Coach)
- 20015–2016: Simba FC
- 2013–2016: Club Victoria University
- 2011-2012: KCCA FC (Third assistant coach)
Medal record
African Cup of Nations finalist (with the Under 20 team)
Uganda Premier League winner (as Player)
Cecafa Club Championship Winner

Morley Byekwaso is a Ugandan former football player but still an acting football manager or coach. Byekwaso was born on the 30th of November 1976 in Luzira town.

== Playing career ==
Byekwaso's playing career began in the early 1990s as a ball boy for KCC FC now KCCA FC. Even as a ball boy, he started participating in the team's training sessions and KCCA FC later signed the then 15-year-old.

He was given an opportunity by the then assistant coach Mike Mutebi in 1995 and quickly established himself in the 3-4- 3 formation. He became a regular starter, with his main weapons being the left foot and excellent vision. He could also handle the physical nature of the opponents, and Byekwaso often passed the ball with assurance. Morley Byekwaso's versatility as a player, known for his two-footed skill that allowed him to play effectively on both wings and midfield.

At the age of 18, he was handed his first national cap in the Uganda cranes team that drew 1–1 with Ethiopia in the Africa Cup of Nations qualification game. He joined SC Villa in 2002 and in his two-year spell at Villa Park, he won two league titles and one Cecafa Club Championship title. In 2005, he crossed to Rwanda and joined Atraco FC. He spent three seasons there, but the move also put an end to his Cranes career. In 2008, he returned to Uganda and moved to Express FC.

Byekwaso was part of the team that participated in the 1999 All-Africa Games and the 2000 Africa Cup of Nations. After retiring from playing in 2008, Byekwaso transitioned into coaching.

== Managerial career ==
His coaching career began at Lugazi United, where he gained early experience. He subsequently joined KCCA FC as an assistant coach under Matia Lule and Baker Mbowa, later serving as interim manager. He then moved to Club Victoria University, starting as an assistant before taking over as head coach.

Byekwaso's career has also taken him to Tanzania, where he managed Simba SC. He returned to KCCA FC as an assistant manager under Mike Mutebi and again served as interim manager before being appointed head coach. He resigned from the position in April 2023 He also had a stint as the interim head coach of the Uganda national team.

In 2019, Byekwaso led the Uganda U-20 national team to the final of the African Cup of Nations. As of 2024, he is the head coach of SC Villa.

== See also ==
- Mike Mutebi
- KCCA FC
