= Godfrey Kateregga =

Ugandan footballer (1960-1999)

Personal information
- Date of birth: May 5, 1960
- Place of birth: Mulago, Uganda
- Date of death: March 13, 1999 (aged 38)
- Place of death: Mulago, Uganda
- Position: Forward

Senior career*
Years	Team	Apps	(Gls)
1977–1978	Tobacco	-	(-)
1978–1985	KCC	-	(-)
1985–1988	Villa	-	(-)
1988–1990	Express	-	(-)

International career
1979–1988	Uganda	-	(-)
- * Club domestic league appearances and goals

Godfrey Kateregga (5 May 1960 – 13 March 1999) was a football striker who played for Uganda national football team.

== Career ==
Born in Mulago (a suburb of Kampala), Kateregga played club football for Tobacco FC, Kampala City Council FC, SC Villa and Express FC. He won four Ugandan Premier League titles (two each with KCC and Villa) and won the Ugandan Cup five times (four with KCC and one with Villa).

Kateregga made several appearances for the Uganda senior national team.
