= Hannington Ssebwalunyo =

Ugandan footballer

Personal information
- Full name: Hannington Ssebwalunyo
- Date of birth: May 28, 1989 (age 37)
- Position: Goalkeeper

Team information
- Current team: NEC FC

Youth career
- Ndejje University
- Bulemeezi (Masaza Cup)
- Ffumbe (Bika tournament)

Senior career*
Years	Team	Apps	(Gls)
2017–2018	BUL FC		
2019–2020	Maroons FC		
2020–2021	URA FC		
2021	→ BUL FC (loan)		
2023–2024	Maroons FC		
2024–	NEC FC		(2)

International career
2020–Present	Uganda Cranes		
- * Club domestic league appearances and goals

Hannington Ssebwalunyo (born 28 May 1989) is a Ugandan professional footballer who plays the position of a goalkeeper for NEC FC in the Uganda Premier League. He has also represented the Uganda Cranes.

== Club career ==
Ssebwalunyo began his football career at Ndejje University, where he featured in the University Football League. He also represented Bulemeezi in the Buganda Masaza Cup and Ffumbe in the Bika Bya Baganda Football Tournament.

He made his Uganda Premier League debut with BUL FC during the 2017–18 season.

In 2019, he signed a three-year deal with Maroons FC, reuniting with coach Douglas Bamweyana.

In 2020, he joined URA FC, describing the transfer as a "dream come true". He was later loaned to BUL FC in 2021, where he made 12 appearances and kept six clean sheets before being recalled by URA.

In August 2023, he returned to Maroons FC on a two-year contract as a replacement for departing goalkeeper Simon Tamale. He was later named the club’s Player of the Season for 2023–24 after keeping 11 clean sheets.

In June 2024, he signed for NEC FC on a two-year deal.

== International career ==
In March 2020, Ssebwalunyo received his first call-up to the Uganda Cranes ahead of the African Nations Championship qualifiers.

He was later part of the squad for the 2024 CHAN qualifiers but was dropped ahead of the 2025 CECAFA Pre-CHAN Tournament.

== Honours ==
- Maroons FC
  - Player of the Season: 2023–24
- NEC FC
  - Best Goalkeeper of the Season: 2024–25
  - Fans’ Player of the Season: 2024–25

== See also ==
- Denis Onyango
- Denis Omedi
- Joel Mutakubwa
