= Buganda Masaza Cup =

Masaza Cup
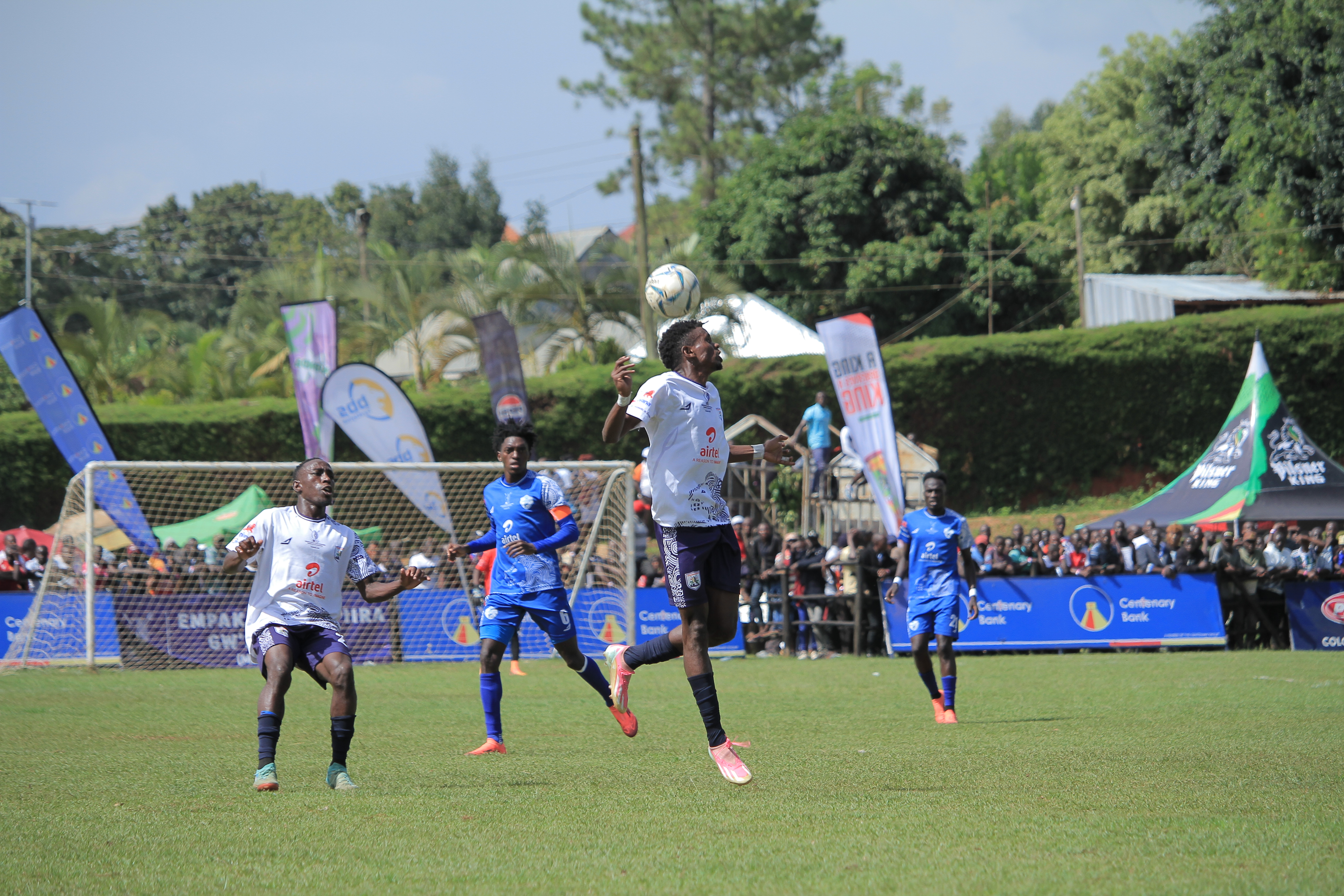
- Organising body: Buganda Kingdom
- Founded: 2004
- First season: 2004
- Country: Uganda
- Number of clubs: 18
- Current champions: Kyaggwe
- Current Shield: Masaza Cup
- Most championships: Gomba (5 titles)
- Top scorer: Meddie Kasule
- Broadcaster: BBS Terefayina
- Sponsor: Airtel Uganda
- Website: Masaza Cup
- Current: 2026

The Masaza Cup is an annual football tournament contested by the 18 traditional counties (masaza) of the Buganda Kingdom in Uganda. Established in 2004, the competition is regarded as one of the biggest grassroots football tournaments in Uganda, both for its cultural importance and its role in nurturing young football talent.

== History ==
The Masaza Cup was inaugurated in 2004 by the Buganda Kingdom as a way of fostering unity, cultural identity, and youth empowerment through sport. Since its inception, it has been held annually and has become a prominent platform for players to showcase their skills before joining professional football clubs in the Uganda Premier League.

=== First Edition 2004 ===
The first edition of the Buganda Masaza Cup in 2004 was won by Gomba, who defeated Mawogola in the final. Mawokota by claimed the 2005 trophy. Kooki then won the 2006 title. From 2007 to 2009, Mawokota, Kyaddondo, and Gomba each had their turn, with Gomba sealing their reputation as an early powerhouse.

=== New era ===
In 2010, the tournament was not held, the following year, new champions emerged: Buluuli won in 2011 and Bulemeezi won the Masaza Cup in 2012, demonstrating the increasing competitiveness of the counties. Mawokota returned to the top in 2013, before Gomba added another title in 2014.

Ssingo lifted their first ever Masaza Cup title in 2015, defeating Buddu 5-0 in a one-sided final. Buddu, however, bounced back strongly to win their first trophy in 2016, sparking a rivalry with Gomba, who reclaimed the crown in 2017 after defeating Ssingo 1-0. Ssingo then added a second title in 2018, while Bulemeezi emerged again in 2019 as champions after defeating Busiro 1-0 after extra time.

=== Dominance ===
Gomba dominated the COVID-19 era of the competition, winning in both 2020 and 2021. In 2022, Busiro made history by winning their first-ever title, beating Buddu in the final. Bulemeezi captured their third crown in 2023, edging Gomba 1-0, before Buddu lifted their third championship in 2024 after defeating Kyaggwe 1-0 in front of a packed Mandela National Stadium.

=== Most Successful County (Ssaza) ===
Over the years, Gomba have become the most successful team with five titles, while Buddu, Mawokota and Bulemeezi have emerged as consistent finalists with each having won three titles. The tournament has evolved into both a football spectacle and a cultural event, often attended by the Kabaka of Buganda and other Kingdom dignitaries.

Several Ugandan internationals, such as Farouk Miya, Arafat Usama, Jimmy Kalema and others, have been scouted from Masaza Cup competitions before joining professional leagues.

== Format ==
The 18 counties of Buganda are divided into three groups of six: Bulange, Muganzirwazza, and Masengere. The group stage is played on a round-robin basis, with the top teams and the best two in third place advancing to the knockout stages of quarterfinals, semifinals, and the final.

Matches are played across stadiums in Buganda, with finals traditionally hosted at major venues such as Hamz Stadium Nakivubo War Memorial Grounds, Mandela National Stadium and Mutesa II Stadium. In 2025, Kitovu Sports Arena in Masaka hosted the opening match for the first time in match where the current champions for 2024, Buddu endged Gomba 1-0.

== Counties ==
The Masaza Cup is contested by the 18 traditional counties (Amasaza) of the Buganda Kingdom. Each county fields its own team representing local talent and cultural pride.

Counties of Buganda by Cluster
Group A	1	2	3	4	5	6
Bulange	Buddu	Busujju	Buluuli	Busiro	Gomba	Ssese
Group B	7	8	9	10	11	12
Muganzirwazza	Ssingo	Kyaggwe	Kabula	Butambala	Kkooki	Mawogola
Group C	13	14	15	16	17	18
Masengere	Buweekula	Kyaddondo	Mawokota	Bulemeezi	Buvuma	Bugerere

== Gallery ==
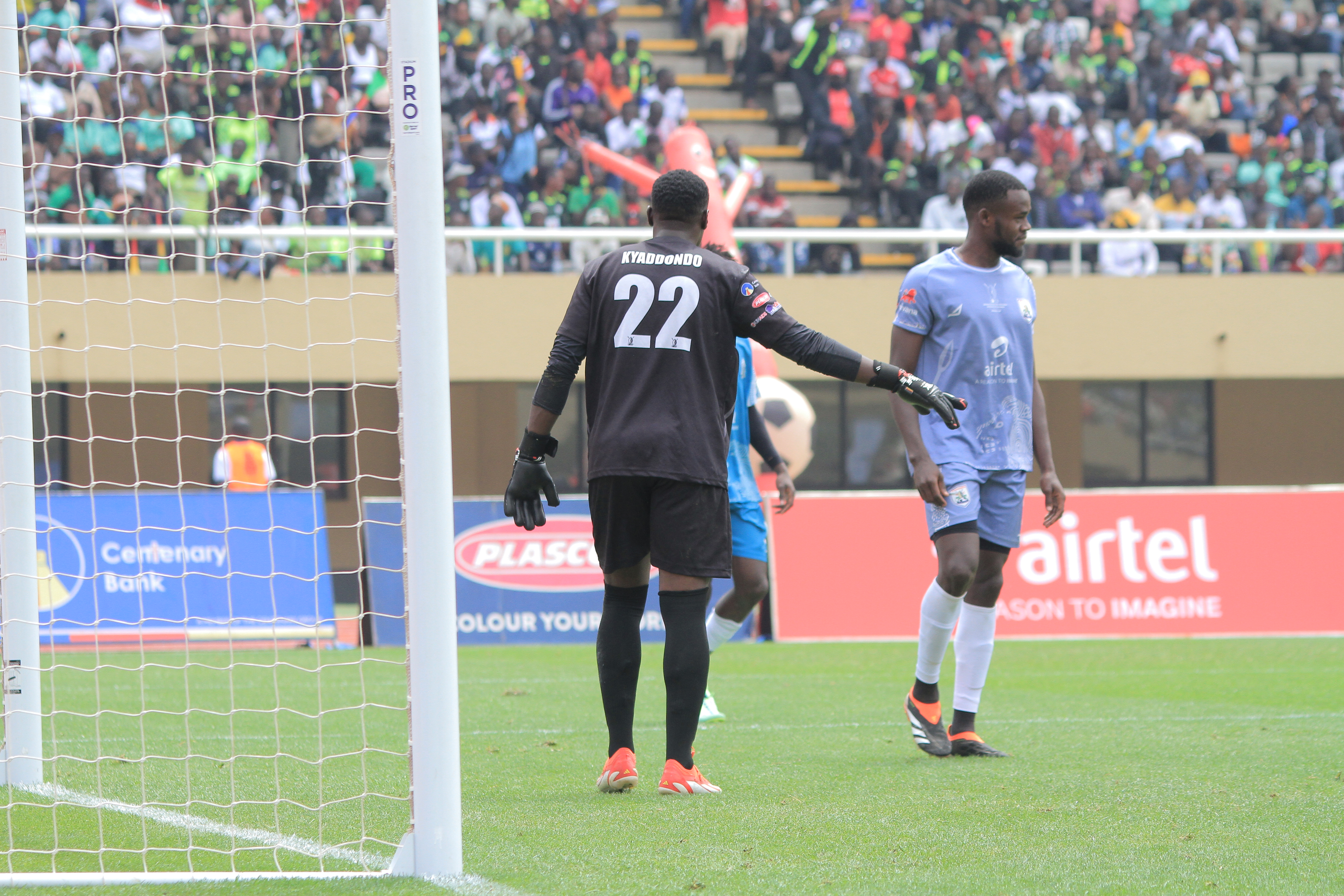
Buwekula Vs Kyaddondo

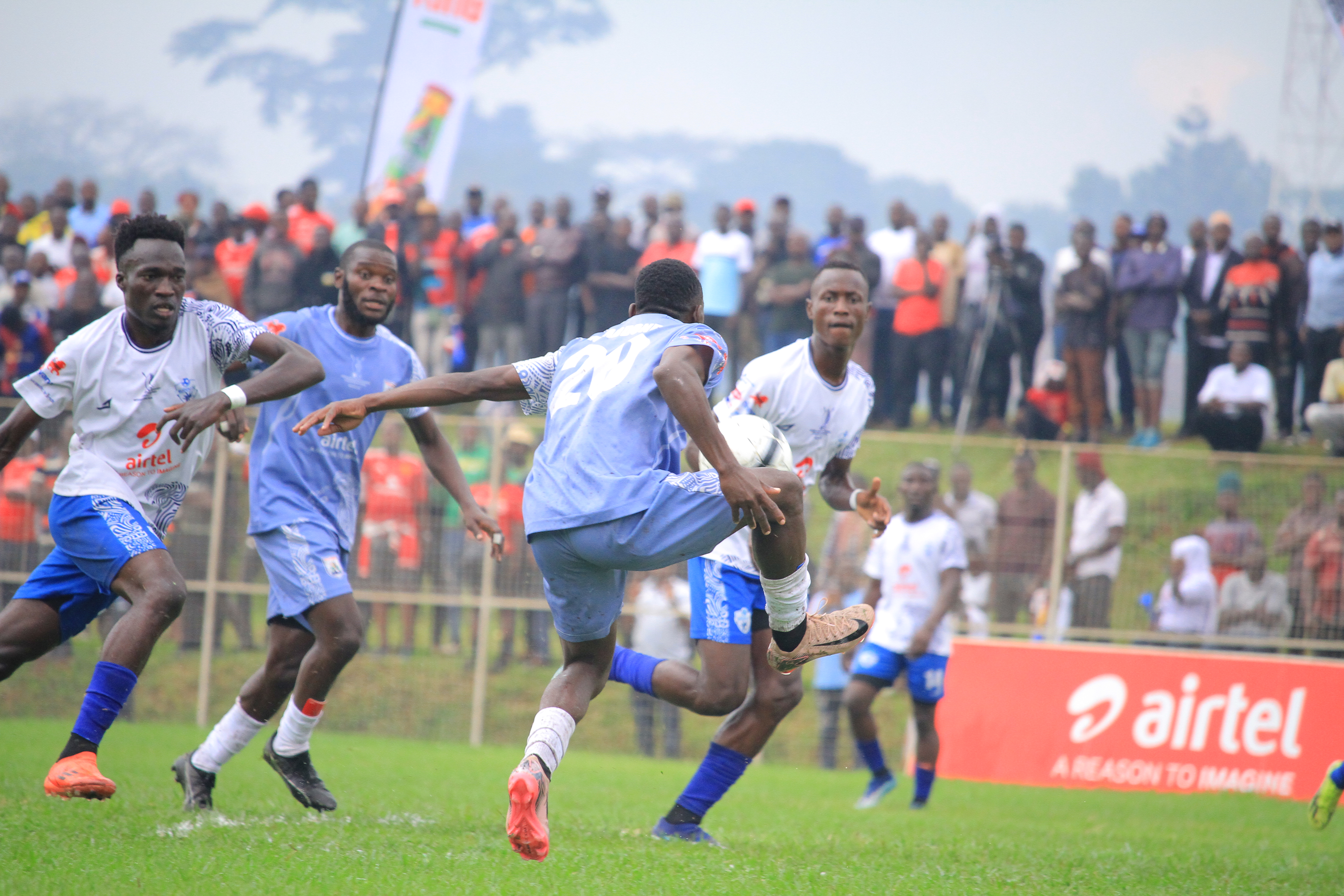
Kyaddondo Vs Buddu

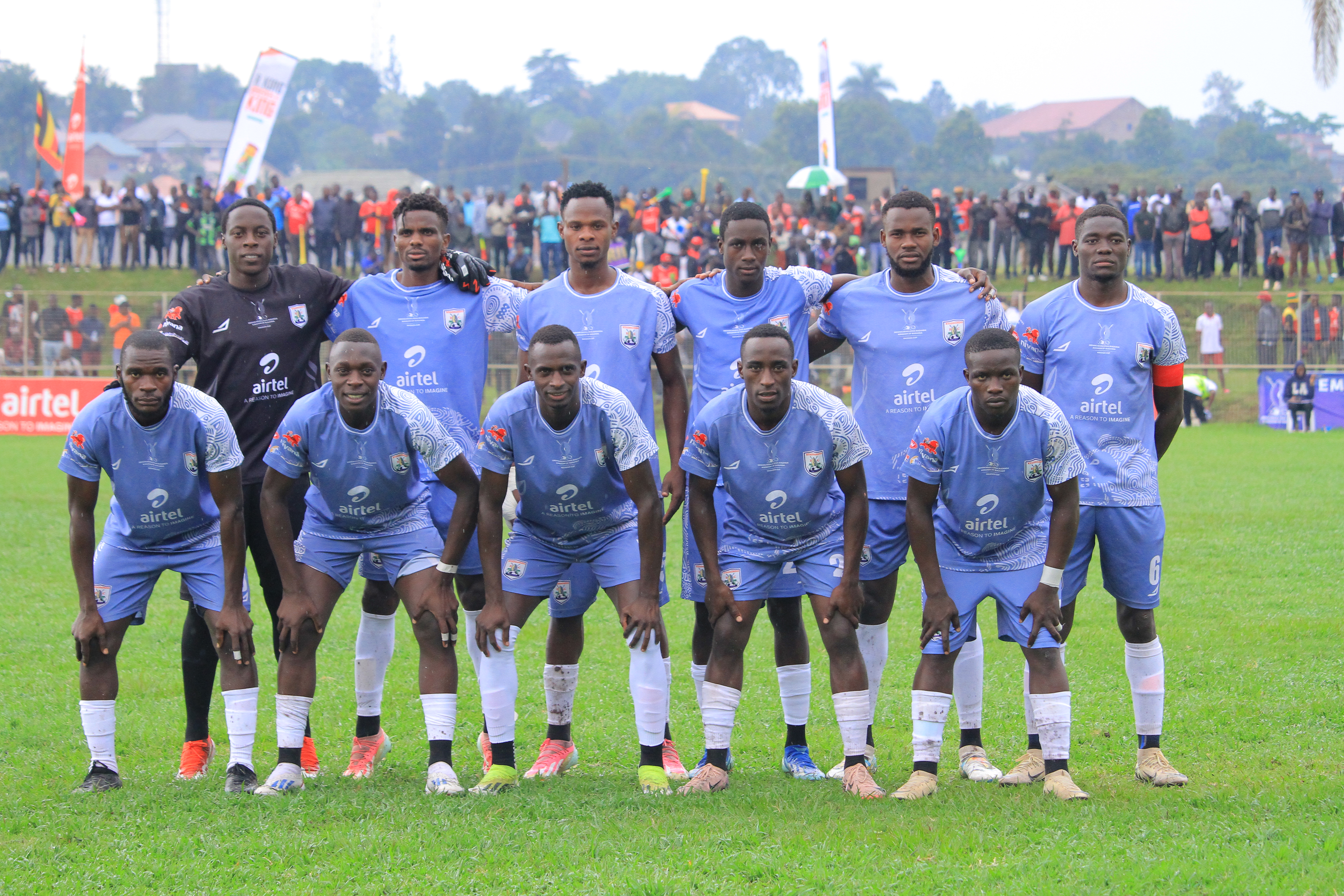
Buwekula Vs Kyaddondo

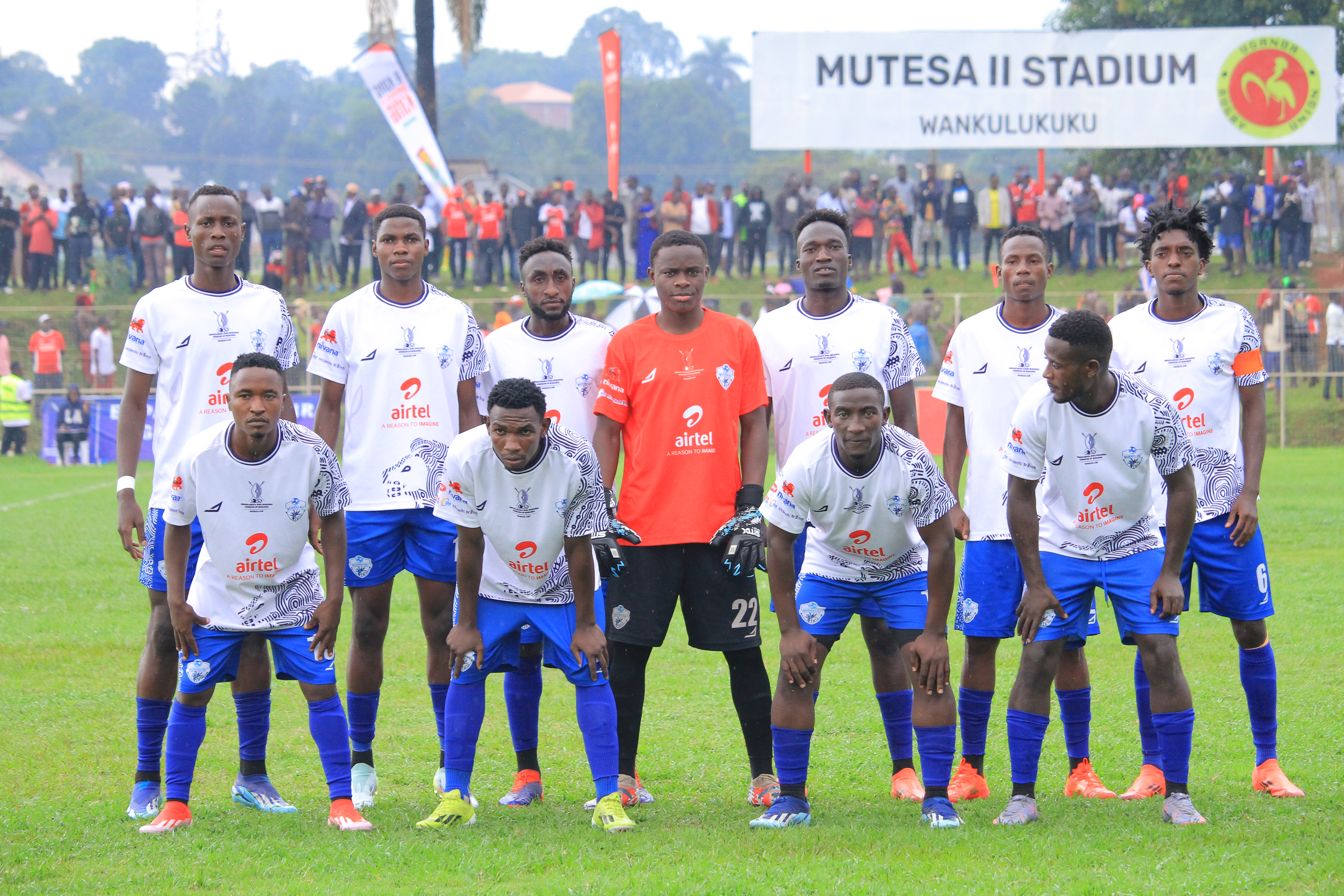
Buddu Vs Kyaddondo

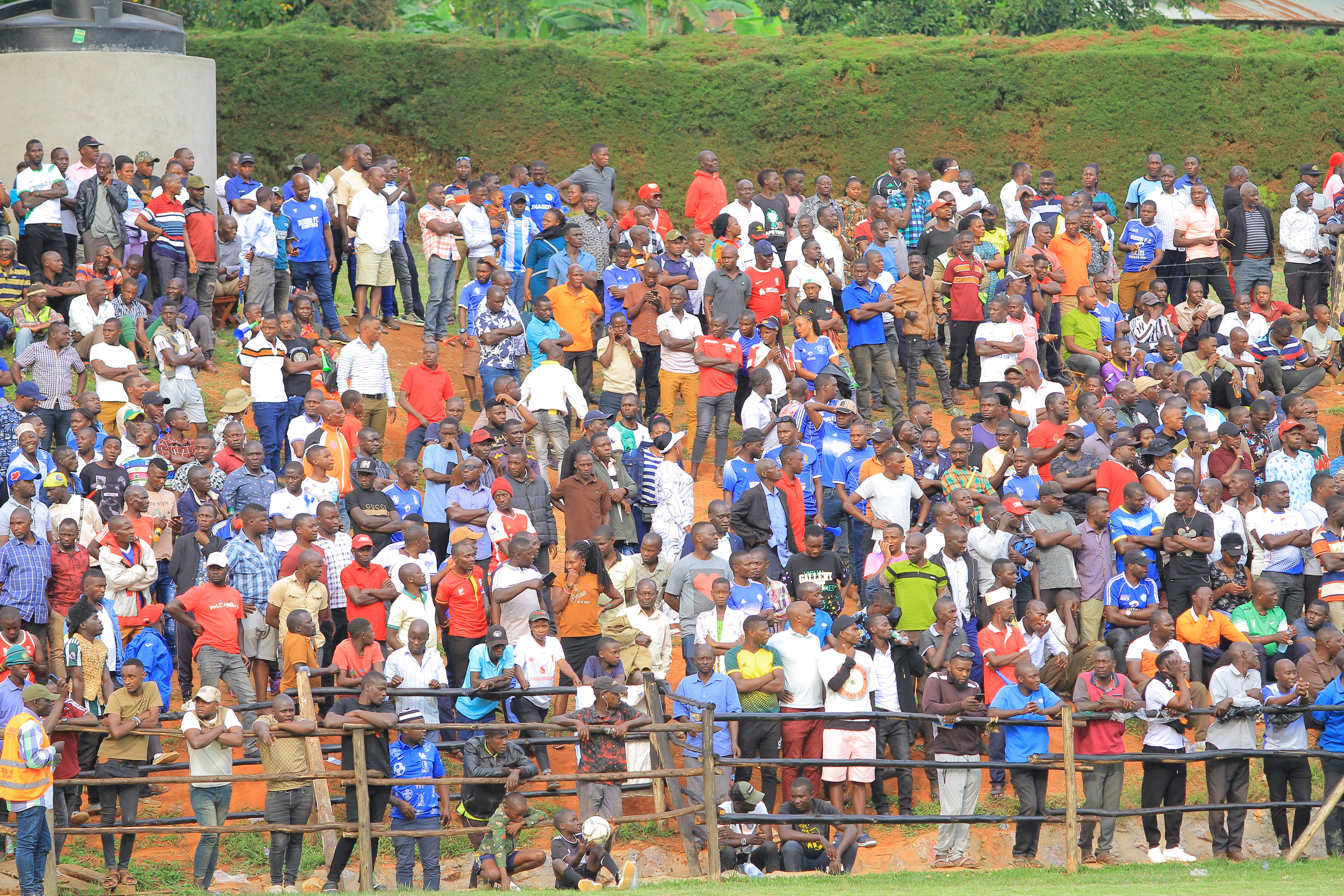
Buddu vs Butambala

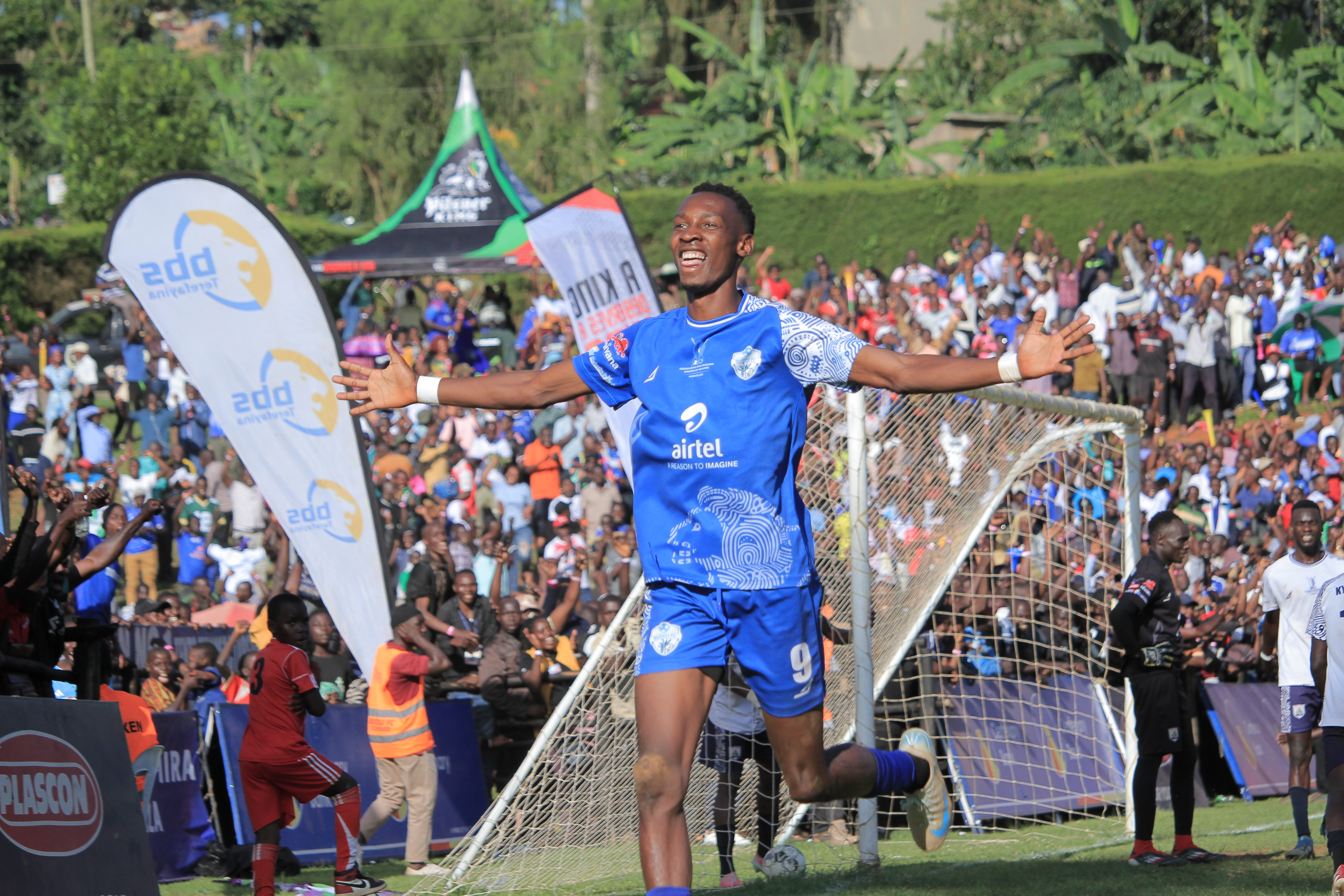
Buddu Vs Kyaddondo - Semifinals 2024

== Past winners ==
The following counties have won the Masaza Cup since its inception:

Masaza Cup Winners
Year	Winner	Runner-up	Venue
2004	Gomba	Mawogola	Nakivubo Stadium
2005	Mawokota	Gomba	Muteesa II Stadium
2006	Kooki	Bugerere	Nakivubo Stadium
2007	Mawokota	Gomba	Nakivubo Stadium
2008	Kyaddondo	Gomba	Nakivubo Stadium
2009	Gomba	Mawogola	Nakivubo Stadium
2010	Not held	–	–
2011	Buluuli	Bulemeezi	Nakivubo Stadium
2012	Bulemeezi	Buweekula	Nakivubo Stadium
2013	Mawokota	Ssingo	Nakivubo Stadium
2014	Gomba	Ssingo	Nakivubo Stadium
2015	Ssingo	Buddu	Nakivubo Stadium
2016	Buddu	Gomba	Muteesa II Stadium
2017	Gomba	Ssingo	Muteesa II Stadium
2018	Ssingo	Buddu	Mandela National Stadium
2019	Bulemeezi	Busiro	Mandela National Stadium
2020	Gomba	Buddu	St. Mary’s Stadium, Kitende
2021	Buddu	Buweekula	St. Mary’s Stadium, Kitende
2022	Busiro	Buddu	Muteesa II Stadium
2023	Bulemeezi	Gomba	Muteesa II Stadium
2024	Buddu	Kyaggwe	Muteesa II Stadium
2025	Buweekula	Ssingo	Hamz Satdium Nakivubo War Memorial grounds
2026	Kyaggwe	Gomba	Muteesa II Stadium

== Records and statistics ==
- Most titles: Gomba – 5 (2004, 2009, 2014, 2017, 2020)
- Most final appearances: Gomba– 11 (2004, 2005, 2007, 2008, 2009, 2014, 2016, 2017, 2020, 2023, 2026) , Buddu-7(2015, 2016, 2018, 2020, 2021, 2022, 2024), Ssingo- 6 (2013, 2014, 2015, 2017,2018, 2025)
- Biggest win in a final: Ssingo 5–0 Buddu (2015 final, Nakivubo Stadium)
- First champions: Gomba (2004)
- Most recent champions: Kyaggwe (2026)
- Counties that have never won: Ssese, Busujju, Kabula, Butambala, Bugerere, Buvuma and Mawogola.

== Notable players ==
- Farouk Miya scored the only goal in 2013 as Mawokota defeated Ssingo 1-0 in the final – later played for the Uganda Cranes, Vipers SC in the Uganda Premier league and clubs in Europe like Standard Liege in Belgium, Konyaspor in Turkey and others.
- Arafat Usama played for Busiro County in 2020 Masaza cup tournament– joined SC Villa and the Uganda national football team.
- Arnold Odong played for Mawokota and Buddu counties– rose from Masaza Cup to Ugandan Premier League football and is now a player at SC Villa in the Uganda premier league
- Jimmy Kalema was the 2025 masaza cup top scorer with 7 goals and won the title with Buweekula that year- Plays Kitara FC in the Uganda premier league and scored the winning goal as Kitara defeated SC Villa 2-1 in the 2026 Stanbic Uganda Cup Final at FUFA Technical Center in Njeru.

== Sponsorship ==
The Masaza Cup has been sponsored by several corporate entities. Airtel Uganda has been the lead sponsor since 2015, while Centenary Bank pledged UGX 200 million towards the 2025 edition.

== Cultural importance ==
The Masaza Cup is not only a football competition but also a cultural festival. It reflects the Buganda Kingdom’s traditions, attracting thousands of fans and dignitaries including the Kabaka (King) of Buganda, who usually presides over the opening and closing ceremonies.

== See also ==
- Buganda Kingdom
- Uganda Premier League
- Football in Uganda
