= Gift Fred =

Ugandan footballer (born 1998)

Personal information
- Date of birth: 21 July 1998 (age 28)
- Place of birth: Masindi, Uganda
- Positions: Defender; centre-back

Team information
- Current team: Saint George
- Number: 17

Youth career
- 2020–2015: Booma FC

Senior career*
Years	Team	Apps	(Gls)
2020–2023	Villa		
2023–2024	Young Africans	16	
2024–	Saint George		

International career^{‡}
2022–	Uganda	5	(0)
- * Club domestic league appearances and goals ‡ National team caps and goals as of 18:32, 22 November 2023 (UTC)

Gift Fred (born 21 July 1998) is a Ugandan professional footballer who plays for Ethiopian Premier League club Saint George and the Uganda national team.

== Club career ==
In August 2021, Gift signed a three-year contract with Uganda Premier League club SC Villa. Prior to signing for Villa, he played for the third division side of Booma FC. He served as the SC Villa captain in the 2022/2023 season.

In August 2023, Gift Fred joined Young Africans on a free transfer from SC Villa and signed a three-year contract.

In September 2024 he officially terminated his contract and joined Saint George on a two-year contract deal.

== International career ==
In December 2022, coach Milutin Sedrojevic summoned him to the Uganda national football team (The Uganda Cranes) for the 2022 African Nations Championship which happened in Algeria. He made his debut in a friendly game between Uganda and Mali which ended in a 0–0 draw in Tunisia. He made his official senior debut in the 2022 African Nations Championship tournament when Uganda was drawing against Democratic Republic of Congo on 14 January 2023 at Annaba Stadium in Algeria.

=== International career statistics ===
As of match played 18 January 2022.

Uganda national team
Year	Apps	Goals
2023	5	0
