= Arnold Odong =

Ugandan footballer (born 1999)

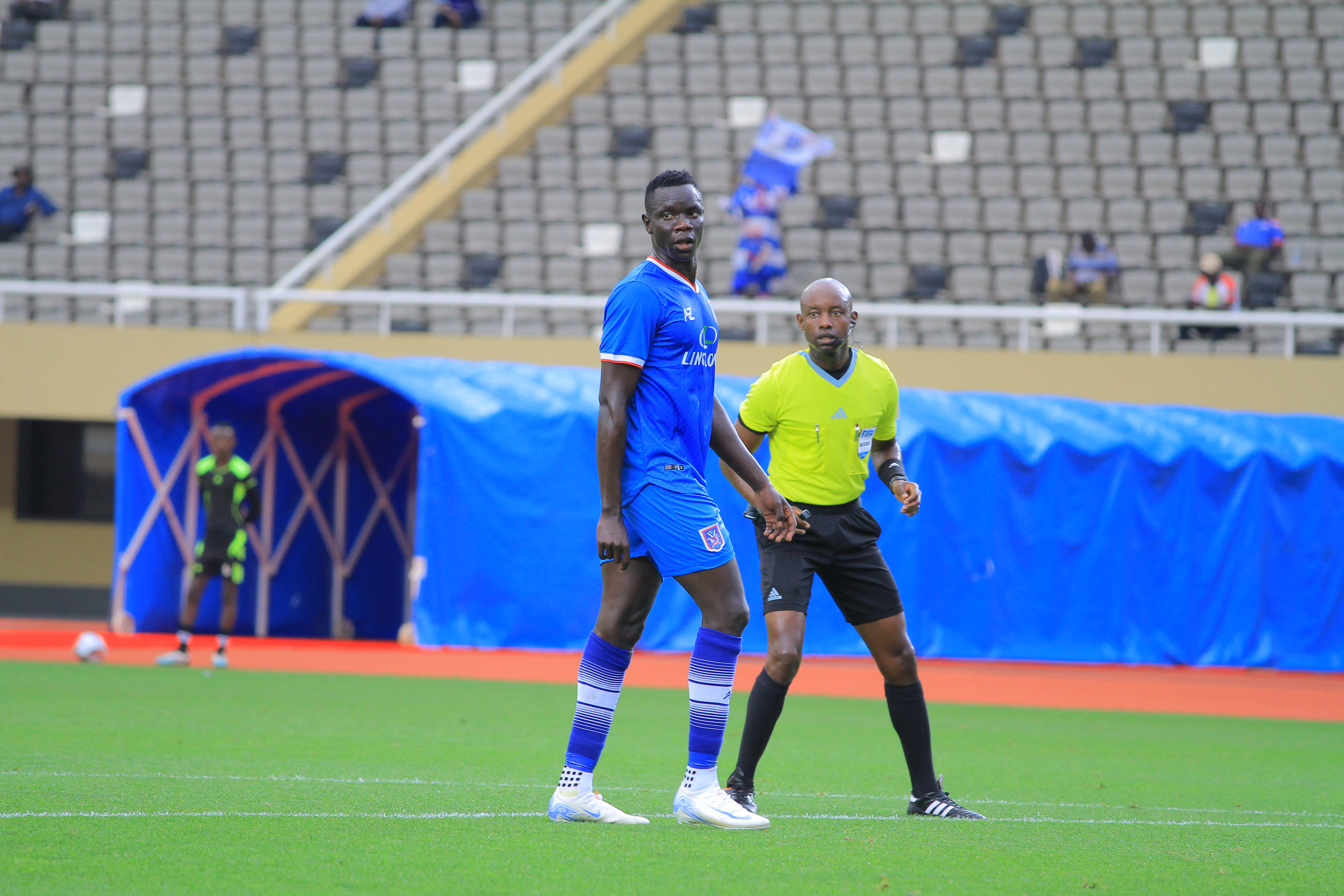
- Odong (left) with Villa in 2024

Personal information
- Full name: Arnold Odong
- Date of birth: 25 March 1999 (age 27)
- Place of birth: Gulu, Uganda
- Height: 1.92 m (6 ft 4 in)
- Position: Centre-back

Team information
- Current team: Villa

Youth career
- Watoto Sports Academy
- Watoto FC

Senior career*
Years	Team	Apps	(Gls)
2023–	Villa	31	(3)

International career
2024–	Uganda	2	(1)
- * Club domestic league appearances and goals

Arnold Odong (born March 25, 1999), is a Ugandan professional footballer who plays as a centre-back for Uganda Premier League club SC Villa and the Uganda national team.

== Early life ==
Arnold Odong was born on March 25, 1999, in Gulu, Uganda. From a young age, he had passion for football while growing up in northern Uganda. He began his football journey with local clubs like Watoto Sports Academy and Watoto FC. Later on, he played for Mawokota and Buddu in the Masaza Cup, a regional tournament that has been a stepping stone for many Ugandan footballers.

Odong's secured a place at MUBS (Makerere University Business School) and completed a diploma in Business Administration.

== Career ==
Arnold Odong's major opportunity arrived in 2023 when he joined SC Villa, one of the more successful football clubs in Uganda. He joined after the exit of their former captain Gift Fred and established himself in the team. In the 2023/24 season, Odong also scored key goals for SC Villa. He marked his first goal for the club in a match against Maroons FC, contributing to a 1–1 draw. His performance in that game earned him the Man of the Match accolade. He also played a part in SC Villa's progress in the Uganda Premier League, which saw them contending for the top positions in the table.

=== National team call-up ===
Odong's performances at SC Villa earned him a call-up to the Uganda national football team, the Cranes. His selection for the national team came at a time when key players like Kenneth Semakula and Halid Lwaliwa were unable to participate due to visa issues and the Cranes needed to address a string of disappointing performances.

== Achievements ==
- National-Team Call-Up: Received his first call-up to the Uganda Cranes in 2024.
- He represented Uganda at the 2024 African Nations Championship (CHAN) Pamoja tournament.

== See also ==
- SC Villa
- Uganda national football team
- Uganda Premier League
