= Michael Kagiri =

Ugandan footballer (born 1969)

Personal information
- Full name: Michael Kagiri
- Date of birth: December 31, 1969 (age 56)
- Place of birth: Uganda
- Position: Goalkeeper

Team information
- Current team: Express FC

Senior career*
| Years | Team | Apps | (Gls) |
| 2017 | Lweza FC | | (0) |
| 2020–2022 | Onduparaka FC | | (0) |
| 2022–2023 | Kitara FC | | (0) |
| 2023 | Muhoroni Youth | | (0) |
| 2023–2024 | URA FC | | (0) |
| 2024– | Express FC | | (0) |
- * Club domestic league appearances and goals

Michael Kagiri (born 31 December 1969) is a Ugandan professional footballer who plays as a goalkeeper.

== Early life and education ==
Kagiri was a former student of St. Juliana high school and Katende SS where he began his journey in football.

== Club career ==
Michael Kagiri is currently playing for Express FC for the season 2024/205. He signed the contract on 18th August 2024 after transferring from URA. He also played for Muhoroni Youth in Buganda Masaza Cup after signing a six-month contract in August 2023.

Michael joined Kitara Football Club during the 2022/2023 season and helped the club to be ranked as the Uganda top flight. He signed a two year contract with Onduparaka ahead of the 2020/2021 season. He played for this club for also the season 2021/2022.
