= Basena Moses =

Ugandan football coach

Moses Basena
Personal information
- Date of birth: 25 November 1967 (age 58)
- Place of birth: Buikwe, Uganda

Team information
- Current team: Ihefu SC (manager)

Managerial career
- Years: Team
- 1994–1996: Coffee Football Club
- 1997–2000: Simba Football Club
- 2001–2004: SC Villa
- 2004–2006: Uganda U20
- 2004–2007: Simba FC
- 2008–2009: Kampala Capital City Authority FC
- 2009–2010: Uganda Revenue Authority SC
- 2011–2012: Simba SC
- 2012–2013: Express FC
- 2015–2016: Uganda (Assistant Coach)
- 2016: Saints FC
- 2017: Uganda (interim)
- 2018: SC Villa
- 2019–2021: Sunrise FC
- 2021–2022: Uganda (Assistant Coach)
- 2023–: Ihefu SC
Medal record
CAF Champions League finalist (as Player)
Uganda Premier League winner (as Player)
Tanzania Premier League Winner (with Simba as Technical Director)

Moses Basena (born 25 November 1967) is a Ugandan football coach who has managed the Uganda national team and several other clubs in Uganda and other countries in East Africa.

He has had an extensive managerial career, both at the club and national team levels, including roles as an assistant coach for the Uganda national team.

== Early life and education ==
Moses Basena was born in Buikwe, Uganda. He attended Makindu Primary School from 1973 to 1979, followed by St. James Secondary School, where he completed both his O and A levels between 1981 and 1986. His early education laid the groundwork for a disciplined approach that he later applied in his football and coaching career.

== Playing career ==
Basena's playing career began at the club level, where he played as a midfielder for Jinja-based Tobacco FC and, later, Coffee FC. He later switched to right back and moved to SC Villa in 1992. His top-level football career stretched from 1987 to 1994. As a player, he was known for his tactical intelligence on the field, which ultimately influenced his future coaching style. The midfielder won three Uganda Premier League trophies in 1990, 1991, and 1993 with Sports Club Villa as a player.

== Coaching education ==
Basena has undertaken extensive coaching education, both locally and internationally. His qualifications include:

- 1995 - Medium Advanced Coaching Course
- 1995 - First Class Coaching Degree Licence
- 1998 - Confederation Africante De Football Certificate High Level Coaching Course
- 1998 - Futuro 11 Certificate of Attendance
- 2004 - International DFB Coaching Course in Germany

== Coaching style and philosophy ==
Basena's coaching style is characterized by a focus on discipline, tactical versatility, and ball retention. He is known for adapting his strategies to match his team's strengths and his opponent's weaknesses, often emphasizing defensive solidity and counter-attacking play.
