= 1979 Uganda National League =

Football season in Uganda

Uganda National League
- Season: 1979
- Champions: Uganda Commercial Bank
- Top goalscorer: Davis Kamoga, Kampala City Council FC (18)

The 1979 Uganda National League was the 12th season of the Ugandan football championship, the top-level football league of Uganda.

== Overview ==
The 1979 Uganda National League was contested by 14 teams and was won by Uganda Commercial Bank FC, while Kilembe Mines FC, Lint Marketing Board and UT Mills were relegated.

== League standings ==
| Pos | Team | Pld | W | D | L | GF | GA | GD | Pts | Qualification or relegation (Note: The previous season's champions Simba FC were excluded.) |
|---|---|---|---|---|---|---|---|---|---|---|
| 1 | Uganda Commercial Bank FC (C) | 26 | 19 | 5 | 2 | 48 | 15 | +33 | 43 | Champions |
| 2 | Kampala City Council FC | 26 | 15 | 6 | 5 | 56 | 28 | +28 | 36 | |
| 3 | Nile Breweries FC | 26 | 16 | 3 | 7 | 44 | 20 | +24 | 35 | |
| 4 | Nytil FC | 26 | 13 | 8 | 5 | 41 | 29 | +12 | 34 | |
| 5 | Maroons FC | 26 | 13 | 6 | 7 | 51 | 32 | +19 | 32 | |
| 6 | NIC | 26 | 11 | 7 | 8 | 33 | 32 | +1 | 29 | |
| 7 | Coffee SC | 26 | 11 | 3 | 12 | 40 | 38 | +2 | 25 | |
| 8 | Tobacco | 26 | 8 | 7 | 11 | 23 | 27 | −4 | 23 | |
| 9 | Nakivubo Boys | 26 | 7 | 8 | 11 | 28 | 32 | −4 | 22 | |
| 10 | Nsambya Old Timers | 26 | 9 | 4 | 13 | 35 | 40 | −5 | 22 | |
| 11 | COOPS | 26 | 8 | 5 | 13 | 25 | 39 | −14 | 21 | |
| 12 | Kilembe Mines FC (R) | 26 | 6 | 3 | 17 | 23 | 47 | −24 | 15 | Relegated |
| 13 | Lint Marketing Board (R) | 26 | 5 | 4 | 17 | 21 | 56 | −35 | 14 | Relegated |
| 14 | UT Mills (R) | 26 | 4 | 5 | 17 | 21 | 52 | −31 | 13 | Relegated |

Source: rsssf.com
(C) Champions; (R) Relegated

== Leading goalscorer ==
The top goalscorer in the 1979 season was Davis Kamoga of Kampala City Council FC with 18 goals.
