= 1999 Uganda Super League =

Football season in Uganda

Uganda Super League
- Season: 1999
- Champions: SC Villa
- Top goalscorer: Andrew Mukasa, SC Villa (45)

The 1999 Ugandan Super League was the 32nd season of the official Ugandan football championship, the top-level football league of Uganda.

== Overview ==
The 1999 Uganda Super League was contested by 20 teams and was won by SC Villa, while Maji, UNNATO FC, Posta, Pamba, Rwampara FC, Roraima FC, Gulu United FC and Rockstars were relegated.

== League standings ==
Pos	Team	Pld	W	D	L	GF	GA	GD	Pts	Qualification or relegation (Note: Umeme FC and Idudi FC were disqualified.)
1	SC Villa (C)	38	29	7	2	108	22	+86	94	Champions
2	Express FC	38	28	8	2	85	15	+70	92	
3	SC Simba	38	21	13	4	58	22	+36	76	
4	Kampala City Council FC	38	21	11	6	68	30	+38	74	
5	Dairy Heroes	38	16	14	8	45	32	+13	62	
6	Police FC	38	16	12	10	50	37	+13	60	
7	Health	38	16	12	10	53	46	+7	60	
8	Nile Breweries FC	38	15	12	11	55	48	+7	57	
9	Iganga Town Council FC	38	16	9	13	41	43	−2	57	
10	SCOUL	38	15	10	13	62	50	+12	55	
11	Military Police FC	38	13	11	14	57	44	+13	50	
12	State House FC	38	13	11	14	39	49	−10	50	
13	Maji (R)	38	12	12	14	66	54	+12	48	Relegated
14	UNNATO FC (R)	38	11	8	19	36	51	−15	41	Relegated
15	Posta (R)	38	11	8	19	54	77	−23	41	Relegated
16	Pamba (R)	38	9	7	22	37	71	−34	34	Relegated
17	Rwampara FC (R)	38	4	13	21	24	72	−48	25	Relegated
18	Roraima FC (R)	38	5	10	23	25	83	−58	25	Relegated
19	Gulu United FC (R)	38	5	6	27	30	83	−53	21	Relegated
20	Rockstars (R)	38	2	10	26	31	93	−62	16	Relegated

Source: rsssf.com
(C) Champions; (R) Relegated

== Leading goalscorer ==
The top goalscorer in the 1999 season was Andrew Mukasa of SC Villa with 45 goals. 'Fimbo' holds the record for the greatest number of league goals scored in a single season.
