= Sam Ssimbwa =

Ugandan football player and manager (born 1967)

Personal information
- Full name: Sam Ssimbwa Bamweyana
- Place of birth: Uganda
- Position: Midfielder

Team information
- Current team: Uganda (Assistant coach)

Senior career*
Years	Team	Apps	(Gls)
1986	KK Cosmos		
1987–1995	KCC FC		
1999–2000	Mbale Heroes FC		

International career
1989–1993	Uganda		

Managerial career
- 1998: Health FC
- 1999–2000: Mbale Heroes FC
- 2001: Masaka LC FC
- 2002: Military Police FC
- 2002: KCC FC
- 2003–2004: Top TV FC
- 2006: ATRACO FC
- 2007: Express F.C.
- 2008: Simba SC
- 2009: KCC FC
- 2009–2010: Sofapaka F.C.
- 2011–2012: SC Victoria University
- 2012: Somalia
- 2013: Express F.C.
- 2013–2014: Police F.C.
- 2014–2015: SC Villa
- 2017-2018: Sofapaka F.C.
- 2018-2021: ORA SC
- 2023-: Kitara FC
- 2023-: Uganda (Assistant coach)
- * Club domestic league appearances and goals

Sam Ssimbwa (born 1967) is a Ugandan professional football player and manager.

== Career ==
Played for three clubs: KK Cosmos (1986), KCC FC (1987-1995) and Mbale Heroes FC (1999-2000). Also he played for the Uganda national football team.

He has coached the clubs Health FC (1998), Mbale Heroes FC (1999-2000), Masaka LC FC (2001), Military Police FC (2002), KCC FC (twice 2002 & 2009), Top TV FC (2003-2004), Rwandan ATRACO FC (2006), Express F.C. (2007), Simba SC (2008) and Kenyan Sofapaka F.C. (2009-2010).

Since November until December 2012 he coached the Somalia national football team. Previously he was a head coach of the SC Victoria University. Later he coached the Express F.C. and Rwandan Police F.C. On 1 October 2014 SC Villa appoint Ssimbwa as coach.

On Nov 2nd 2023 was appointed the Uganda National Team Assistant Coach.

Family and children Milly Bayiyana Rebecca Nakayenga Faith Nakamanya William nakibinge Nassuna Sharon Ssimbwa kauthara
