= David Otti =

Ugandan football coach (1940-2011)

David Otti (1940 – 3 March 2011) was one of Uganda's most respected coaches and one of the most decorated persons in Ugandan football.

== Early life ==
Otti was born in Gulu, northern Uganda.

== Career ==
Otti's leg was amputated last May following a near four-year battle against diabetes. During his time, he coached all the top three Ugandan clubs - Express, KCC and SC Villa.

He spread his wings across the region to work at Kenyan sides Volcano United and Gor Mahia (1981–83), Somalia's Mogadishu Municipal Council (1987–1990) and Rwanda's outfit APR (1995–96) plus serving as National Council of Sports (NCS) general secretary.

It is at Express FC where Otti is revered most, having brought the club their first league title in almost two decades back in 1993. He also won three Ugandan Cup titles there.

Otti is best remembered as one of the most successful coaches in Ugandan football and led all giant clubs in Ugandan Football that include Express, SC Villa and KCC FC to multiple titles, and was successful both with attacking and defensive tactics.

Otti played as a defender. His career began in the 1960s, playing for Bitumastic and the Uganda national team, including the 1968 African Cup of Nations. He began his coaching career in 1973.

He also coached the Uganda Cranes, Uganda's national team which qualified for the Africa Cup of Nations in Cairo (1974) and Ethiopia (1976).

He also briefly had short coaching spells in Somalia and Rwanda.

== Personal life ==
David Otti was married to Faith, and had five children, Richard Otti, Juddy Akello Olunga, Leonard Odong, David Ochan, and Jackie Otti.

Otti died at the age of 71 on 3 March 2011 at Case MedCare Hospital in Kampala. Preliminary medical reports showed he succumbed to pulmonary embolism before his body was transferred to Mulago National Referral Hospital for a conclusive post-mortem. This was still on-going by press time. He was also battling with diabetes while he was coach of Express FC, a Ugandan football club. He was buried in Pece.
