= Paul Hasule =

Ugandan footballer and coach (1959–2004)

Paul Edwin Hasule
Personal information
- Full name: Paul Edwin Hasule
- Date of birth: 20 November 1959
- Place of birth: Kampala, Uganda
- Date of death: 26 April 2004 (aged 44)
- Place of death: Mulago Hospital, Kampala, Uganda
- Position: Right back

Senior career*
Years	Team	Apps	(Gls)
1982–1993	SC Villa		

International career
1984–1993	Uganda		

Managerial career
- 1994–1995: SC Villa
- 1995: State House
- 1995–1998: Simba SC
- 1998–2000: SC Villa
- 2000–2004: Police FC
- * Club domestic league appearances and goals

Paul Edwin Hasule (20 November 1959 – 26 April 2004) was a Ugandan former footballer. He was captain and coach of the Uganda national football team (known as "The Cranes"). He had been involved in the national team setup as player and coach for 25 years.

He made a name for himself as a footballer with record local champions SC Villa and became the main factor in their victories between 1982 and 1994. Hasule was part of the mighty SC Villa team that won the inaugural Super League unbeaten in 1982. He also led the club to the prestigious East and Central Africa club title in 1987. Twice he took SC Villa to the finals on the continent, Africa Club Championship in 1991 and CAF Cup in 1992.

He retired as a player in 1993 to become assistant coach and team manager of SC Villa. He left in 1995 to coach State House and later Simba SC but returned in 1998 to SC Villa to win a historic 4th 'Double' (championship and club title). After winning another 'Double' in 2000, Hasule's contract was not renewed in 2001 and he moved on to coach Police FC until his death.

Aged 44, he died in Mulago Hospital in 2004, his death elicited emotional responses from a legion of his followers who paid him their last respects in kind by ensuring a decent burial, pitching in to meet the funeral expenses including the purchasing of a coffin draped in the national flag in his honour.
