= 2022–23 Uganda Premier League =

Football season in Uganda

Uganda Premier League
- Season: 2022–23
- Champions: Vipers SC
- Matches: 210
- Goals: 439 (2.09 per match)

The 2022–23 Uganda Premier League was the 55th season of the Uganda Premier League, the top-tier football league in Uganda. The league was reduced to 15 teams after promoted Kyetume FC failed to receive a license in time for the fixture list to be released, causing them to be administratively relegated to the third division.

Vipers SC won the title on goal difference on the last day of the season. SC Villa topped the table with 52 points entering the last matchday, but lost to URA 1–0, meaning Vipers 5–0 win over Busoga was enough to pass Villa and claim the title over KCCA, who also won 5–0 on the last match day to qualify for the Confederations Cup. Villa had two points deducted for hooliganism in November 2022 which would have given them their first title since 2004 and were made to play five games behind closed doors.

At the other end of the table, Onduparaka were relegated after seven seasons in the top flight. Lira-based side Blacks Power were also relegated on the second to last matchday.

== League Table ==
Pos	Team	Pld	W	D	L	GF	GA	GD	Pts	Qualification or relegation
1	Vipers (C)	28	15	8	5	40	13	+27	53	Champions, Qualification to the 2023–24 CAF Champions League
2	Kampala Capital City Authority	28	15	8	5	44	23	+21	53	Qualification to the 2023–24 CAF Confederation Cup
3	Villa (Note: -2 points, -2 goals)	28	17	3	8	27	20	+7	52	
4	Arua Hill	28	13	5	10	33	28	+5	44	
5	Uganda Revenue Authority	28	10	12	6	36	23	+13	42	
6	Maroons	28	10	11	7	28	29	−1	41	
7	BUL	28	8	12	8	31	23	+8	36	
8	Wakiso Giants	28	9	9	10	30	27	+3	36	
9	Bright Stars	28	9	8	11	23	30	−7	35	
10	Express	28	8	10	10	31	35	−4	34	
11	Gaddafi	28	7	10	11	22	29	−7	31	
12	Busoga United (Note: -3 points, -3 goals)	28	9	4	15	18	40	−22	28	
13	UPDF	28	6	9	13	24	40	−16	27	
14	Blacks Power (R)	28	6	8	14	21	41	−20	26	Relegation
15	Onduparaka (Note: -2 points, -2 goals) (R)	28	5	9	14	24	38	−14	22	Relegation

Source: soccerway.com
Rules for classification: 1) points; 2) goal difference; 3) number of goals scored.
(C) Champions; (R) Relegated
