= George Mukasa =

Retired Ugandan association football coach

George Mukasa Kyagaba
Personal information
- Full name: George Kyagaba Mukasa
- Date of birth: September 22 1949
- Place of birth: Mengo
- Position: Goalkeeper

Senior career*
Years	Team	Apps	(Gls)
	Express FC	16	
- KCCA FC
- Nsambya FC

International career
- Uganda Cranes
- * Club domestic league appearances and goals

Football career

  - George Mukasa Kyagaba**(22 September 1949 – 1 November 2026)

George Mukasa Was a Ugandan footballer and football coach who made significant contributions to Ugandan football. He is particularly remembered for his achievements as head coach of Sports Club Villa (SC Villa), which he guided to its first-ever Uganda Premier League title in 1982 and its maiden Uganda Cup triumph in 1983.

He also played for Express FC and Kampala City Council Football Club (KCC), represented Uganda in football, and later coached the Uganda national football team, known as the Uganda Cranes.

  1. Early life and education

George Mukasa Kyagaba was born on 22 September 1949 in Mengo-Kisenyi, Kampala, Uganda. He attended Camp Kake Primary School before proceeding to Kololo Secondary School.

Growing up in Kisenyi, Mukasa developed an interest in football from an early age. His proximity to national team goalkeeper John Agadi inspired him to pursue goalkeeping. He began learning the position while still young, although he also played in other positions during his early football years.

  1. Playing career

Mukasa began his football journey with Nakivubo Boys, a team associated with Express FC. His performances attracted the attention of Jolly Kiwanuka, who persuaded him to join Express FC around 1968.

At Express, he initially competed for the goalkeeper position with experienced players Joseph Masajjage and Mbowa. Despite initially being third choice, he eventually established himself as the club's first-choice goalkeeper.

In 1971, Mukasa moved to Kampala City Council Football Club (KCC), following an approach by Jaberi Bidandi Ssali. He became an important member of the team and was part of the KCC side that won the 1976 league championship. He recorded five clean sheets and featured in 16 matches during that campaign.

He also earned opportunities to represent Uganda at international level.

Mukasa's playing career came to an end around 1978. A newspaper tribute published following his death reported that a hand injury prevented him from participating in the 1978 Africa Cup of Nations (AFCON).

  1. Coaching career

After retiring as a player in 1978, Mukasa transitioned into coaching. His first assignment was with City Cubs, KCC's feeder team.

Between 1979 and 1981, he travelled to Ethiopia and Germany to further develop his coaching knowledge and experience.

    1. SC Villa

Towards the end of 1981, Mukasa joined SC Villa after being persuaded by club official Patrick Kawooya.

His appointment marked the beginning of one of the most successful early periods in the club's history.

In 1982, he guided SC Villa to its first-ever Uganda Premier League championship. The achievement was particularly remarkable because Villa completed the entire league season unbeaten.

The league victory qualified SC Villa for its first appearance in continental football in 1983. Under Mukasa's leadership, the club reached the quarter-finals of the African Cup of Champions Clubs, defeating Madagascar's Dinamo Fimma and Mozambique's Ferroviário de Maputo before being eliminated by Zambia's Nkana Red Devils.

In 1983, although Villa did not retain its league championship, Mukasa guided the club to another historic achievement by winning its first Uganda Cup. Villa defeated KCC 1–0 in the final.

Mukasa left SC Villa at the end of the 1983 season following disagreements with the club's leadership.

    1. Uganda Cranes

Mukasa later served as head coach of the Uganda national football team, the Uganda Cranes, between 1984 and 1985.

His appointment marked another important chapter in his contribution to Ugandan football, as he moved from club football to leading the national side.

    1. Other coaching appointments

Throughout his coaching career, Mukasa also worked with several Ugandan football clubs, including Express FC, Coffee FC and Nsambya FC.

He continued contributing to the development of football in Uganda through his experience as a player and coach.

  1. Death and legacy

George Mukasa Kyagaba died on 1 November 2026 at Mengo Hospital in Kampala, Uganda, aged 77.

His death prompted tributes from former footballers, colleagues and members of the Ugandan football community.

He is particularly remembered for delivering SC Villa's first league championship in 1982 and its first Uganda Cup in 1983. His contribution to Express FC, KCC, SC Villa and the Uganda Cranes forms part of his lasting legacy in Ugandan football.

Mukasa remains remembered as one of the figures who helped shape an important period in the history of Ugandan football.

== Background ==
George Kyagaba Mukasa was born in 1949 at Mengo in Kampala district.

== Career ==
=== Football career ===
Mukasa joined KCCA FC from Express FC in 1971 as a goalkeeper . He kept five clean sheets in the campaign and featured in 16 games. Mukasa retired from football in 1978 and turned to coaching, handling clubs like SC Villa, Express FC, Coffee United SC and Nsambya FC among other football clubs.

=== Coaching career ===
==== SC Villa ====
Mukasa won one league title with SC Villa in 1982, He also won the Uganda Cup twice in 1983 with SC Villa and in 1985 with Express FC.

On the 13th of August 1983, SC Villa played against Millers FC in a match league at Nakivubo stadium, it is at that game that George Mukasa was ordered off the pitch for misbehaving after one of his players (Rogers Nsubuga) suffered a minor injury shortly before halftime, after several solicitations by referee Dick Nsubuga, all fell on deaf ears. This forced Dick Nsubuga to ask George Mukasa to vacate the touchline before the second half begun. This match eventually ended 1-1.

George Mukasa's acts annoyed SC Villa officials including the club president at the time (Patrick Kawooya),this led to his one-month suspension and before he could return, FUFA also gave him a one-year ban for the same incident against the Millers. later the ban was lifted allowing George Mukasa to perform his duties yet again.

On September 14, 1984,he returned to Villa Park but the club had already fallen from its glory and KCCA FC had been declared the league winners.

==== Uganda Cranes ====
George Mukasa coached The Cranes in 1984, guiding the team to the Cecafa Cup semifinal, he also played for the national team from 1971 to1976. Mukasa coached the Uganda Cranes between 1984 -1985.

George Mukasa introduced the Kawowo style of play at the National team between 1984 and 1985. However much this was entertaining, it yielded no results for the Uganda Cranes as they lost to Malawi at the CECAF semi finals games that were held at the Cranes home grounds,this led to his dismissal in 1985.

== Read also ==
- Tom Ikara
- Denis Onyango
- Ismail Watenga
