= Godfrey Walusimbi =

Ugandan footballer (born 1989)

Personal information
- Date of birth: 3 July 1989 (age 37)
- Place of birth: Kampala, Uganda
- Height: 1.75 m (5 ft 9 in)
- Position: Left-back

Senior career*
Years	Team	Apps	(Gls)
2006–2010	Villa	92	(22)
2010–2013	Bunamwaya SC	34	(5)
2013	CS Don Bosco		
2013	Villa		
2014–2018	Gor Mahia	59	(6)
2018–2019	Kaizer Chiefs	10	(0)
2019–2020	Vllaznia	8	(0)

International career
2009–2019	Uganda	105	(3)
- * Club domestic league appearances and goals

Godfrey Walusimbi (born 3 July 1989) is a Ugandan former professional footballer who played as a left-back. He is the first Ugandan footballer to play more than 100 international matches.

== Club career ==
In June 2011 Walusimbi went to Sweden for a two-week trial with Allsvenskan side BK Häcken.

=== CS Don Bosco ===
In January 2013, he left Bunamwaya for DR Congo side CS Don Bosco. Having spent a few months with the team, he canceled his contract in response to the poor working conditions. He returned to his former team SC Villa.

=== Gor Mahia ===
In December 2013, Walusimbi joined Kenyan Premier League champions Gor Mahia where coached by former Uganda national team coach Bobby Williamson.

=== Kaizer Chiefs ===
In August 2018, Walusimbi moved to South African Premier Division club Kaizer Chiefs, signing a three-year contract. The reported cost of the transfer was around 4.4 million South African rand. He made his league debut for the club on 18 September 2018, playing all ninety minutes in a 2–0 away victory over Free State Stars. In January 2019, Walusimbi left the club, electing to return home to his native Uganda.

=== Vllaznia ===
In September 2019, Walusimbi joined Albanian Superliga side KF Vllaznia Shkodër on a one-year contract. He left the club at the end of the season.

== International career ==
On 4 September 2010, Walusimbi made his Uganda national team debut in the 2012 Africa Cup of Nations qualifier against Angola as a replacement for the injured Nestory Kizito. On 16 April 2011, he helped the Uganda U23 Team to a 2–1 first leg victory over Tanzania in the All Africa Games qualifier with excellent performance in which he created the first goal with some creative work on the left flank. On 4 June 2011, he scored against Guinea-Bissau in a crucial 2012 Africa Cup of Nations qualification game. The goal was the first in a 2–0 win for the cranes which saw them top Group J in front of a packed Mandela National Stadium.

== Career statistics ==
=== International ===
Appearances and goals by national team and year
National team	Year	Apps	Goals
Uganda	2009	6	0
Uganda	2010	12	0
Uganda	2011	14	1
Uganda	2012	13	2
Uganda	2013	11	0
Uganda	2014	8	0
Uganda	2015	4	0
Uganda	2016	9	0
Uganda	2017	14	0
Uganda	2018	7	0
Uganda	2019	7	0
Total		105	3

Scores and results list Uganda's goal tally first, score column indicates score after each Walusimbi goal.

List of international goals scored by Godfrey Walusimbi
No.	Date	Venue	Opponent	Score	Result	Competition
1	4 June 2011	Mandela National Stadium, Kampala, Uganda	Guinea-Bissau	1–0	2–0	2012 Africa Cup of Nations qualification
2	9 June 2012	Mandela National Stadium, Kampala, Uganda	Senegal	1–1	1–1	2014 FIFA World Cup qualification
3	16 June 2012	Mandela National Stadium, Kampala, Uganda	Congo	2–0	4–0	2013 Africa Cup of Nations qualification

== See also ==
- List of men's footballers with 100 or more international caps
