= Asuman Lubowa =

Ugandan football coach and administrator

Asuman Lubowa is a Ugandan football coach and administrator. He has also worked as a technical director.

== Early career and playing days ==
Lubowa's football career began as a player for Ugandan clubs such as Express FC, SC Villa, and KCCA FC.

== Coaching career ==
Lubowa achieved recognition as the head coach of the Uganda Cranes, the national football team, where he led the team to a notable victory in the 1996 CECAFA Cup in Sudan. Before this achievement, he coached the Uganda U-23 (Kobs) team, steering them to the 1995 CECAFA Cup final.

In club football, Lubowa coached teams including Express FC, UMEME FC which closed in the late 1990s, Police FC, SC Villa, and KCCA FC, alongside stints with other entities like Posta and Uganda Airlines. Under his guidance, Police FC won the national league in 2005, ending SC Villa’s dominant reign. Police FC defeated SC Villa 3 - 1 on penalties at Mandela National Stadium, Namboole

== Administrative roles ==
In 2009, he was appointed as the technical director of the Federation of Uganda Football Associations (FUFA). He served in this role for nearly a decade, where his responsibilities included overseeing technical programs, aligning with FIFA’s development goals, and promoting grassroots football across the country.

During his tenure, Lubowa worked on the FIFA Grassroots Football Program, which targeted children aged 6-12 and emphasized mass participation through schools and communities. He retired from FUFA in February 2018.

== Recent involvements ==
In February 2019, Lubowa was appointed as the Technical Director of Ndejje University Football Club.

== Challenges ==
Lubowa resigned as the head coach of the Uganda Cranes in 1999, citing a lack of adequate support from the Federation of Uganda Football Associations (FUFA). This decision came after increasing frustrations over the limited resources and administrative challenges he faced, which he felt hindered his ability to deliver results.
