= Mike Mutebi =

Ugandan manager (born 1979)

Personal information
- Date of birth: 18/2/1979
- Place of birth: Uganda
- Position: Defender

Managerial career
- Years: Team
- 2004: Uganda
- 200?–200?: KCC FC
- 2011–201?: SC Villa

Mike Mutebi is a Ugandan professional football player and manager.

== Career ==
He has coached KCC FC and the Uganda national football team.

In December 2011 he became the head coach of the SC Villa.
