= Paul Nkata =

Ugandan football manager (born 1960)

Personal information
- Full name: Paul Nkata
- Date of birth: 22 March 1960 (age 66)

Paul Nkata is a Ugandan former international footballer now serving as the coach at Kenyan second-tier side Muhoroni Youth F.C.

== Career ==
As a player he turned out for Ugandan clubs Nsambya FC, Bunamwaya S.C., Express FC, and SC Villa.

He formerly coached Ugandan sides Misindye FC, SC Villa, Express FC, Uganda Revenue Authority SC. Uganda U-20, and Kenyan sides Nairobi City Stars, Tusker F.C., Bandari F.C. (Kenya), and Kakamega Homeboyz F.C.

Before heading to Muhoroni Youth F.C. he had been appointed coach by Gor Mahia F.C. only for it to be revoked days later.
