= Uganda national football team =

Uganda
- Nickname(s): The Cranes; The Uganda Cranes
- Association: Federation of Uganda Football Associations (FUFA)
- Confederation: CAF (Africa)
- Sub-confederation: CECAFA (East & Central Africa)
- Head coach: Paul Put
- Captain: Khalid Aucho
- Most caps: Godfrey Walusimbi (105)
- Top scorer: Emmanuel Okwi (28)
- Home stadium: Mandela National Stadium
- FIFA code: UGA
First colours	Third colours

FIFA ranking
- Current: 87 ▲2 (7 October 2026)
- Highest: 62 (January 2016)
- Lowest: 152 (July 2002)

First international
- Kenya 1–1 Uganda (Nairobi, Kenya; 1 May 1926)

Biggest win
- Uganda 13–1 Kenya (Uganda; 14 December 1932)

Biggest defeat
- Egypt 6–0 Uganda (Alexandria, Egypt; 30 July 1995); Tunisia 6–0 Uganda (Tunis, Tunisia; 28 February 1999)

Africa Cup of Nations
- Appearances: 8 (first in 1962)
- Best result: Runners-up (1978)

African Nations Championship
- Appearances: 6 (first in 2011)
- Best result: Quarter-finals (2024)

COSAFA Cup
- Appearances: 1 (first in 2019)
- Best result: Quarter-finals (2019)

CECAFA Cup
- Appearances: 38 (first in 1973)
- Best result: Champions (1973, 1976, 1977, 1989, 1990, 1992, 1996, 2000, 2003, 2008, 2009, 2011, 2012, 2015, 2019)
- Website: fufa.co.ug

The Uganda national football team as known as The Cranes, Uganda Cranes have represented Uganda in men's international football since the first international match in 1926. It is controlled by Federation of Uganda Football Associations (FUFA), the governing body for football in Uganda, which is affiliated with CAF and comes under the global jurisdiction of world football's governing body FIFA. Uganda competes in the three major international tournaments contested by African nations: the FIFA World Cup, Africa Cup of Nations and African Nations League.

== History ==
The Uganda Cranes made their debut on 1 May 1926 against Kenya, drawing 1–1. In 1962, they qualified for their Africa Cup of Nations debut in the third edition of the tournament, which included only 4 teams. In the semi-finals, the Cranes were defeated and eliminated by the United Arab Republic (2–1), and then lost the third-place match against Tunisia (3–0).

The Cranes returned to the Africa Cup of Nations in 1974, where they were eliminated in the first round following 2 defeats against Egypt and Zambia and a draw against Ivory Coast. In 1976, they were eliminated in the first round, being defeated by Ethiopia, Egypt and Guinea.

In the 1978 Africa Cup of Nations, the Cranes finished second in the group stages defeating the Republic of Congo (3–1) and Morocco (3–0) and lost 3–1 to Tunisia. In the semi-finals they eliminated Nigeria (2–1), and in the finals they were defeated by Ghana (2–0).

In 2017 the Cranes qualified for the African Cup of Nations again after 39 years. They finished the tournament in the first round after two consecutive 1–0 losses to Ghana and Egypt and a 1–1 draw against Mali.

In the qualifiers for the 2018 World Cup, the Cranes progressed to the second round with a 4–0 aggregate win against Togo, and were drawn into a group with Egypt, Ghana and the Republic of Congo. They finished the group with 2 0–0 draws against Ghana, a win and a draw against the Republic of Congo and a victory against Egypt followed by a defeat at the home of the Pharaohs. The 9 points won were not enough for Uganda to qualify against the 13 of the Egyptians who finished first in the standings.

In the qualifiers for the 2019 Africa Cup of Nations, the Cranes cruised through qualifiers against Tanzania, Cape Verde and Lesotho. In the competition proper, a 2–0 victory against DR Congo meant that the Uganda Cranes had won their first match in the competition for 41 years. In the other 2 games of the group Uganda obtained a draw against Zimbabwe (1–1) and a defeat against the hosts Egypt (2–0) qualifying in second place, to be eliminated in the round of 16 by Senegal (1–0). They qualified for the 2025 Africa Cup of Nations after South Sudan beat Congo 3–2 on November 14, 2024.

== Team image ==
=== Kits and crest ===
==== Kit suppliers ====
Kit supplier	Period	Ref
Admiral	1926–1978	
Orbit	1992–1994	
Erima	1998–1999	
Hummel	2000–2006	
Adidas	2007–2017	
Erreà	2017–2018	
Mafro	2018–2021	
Umbro	2021–2024	
Janzi	2024–present	

==== Colours ====
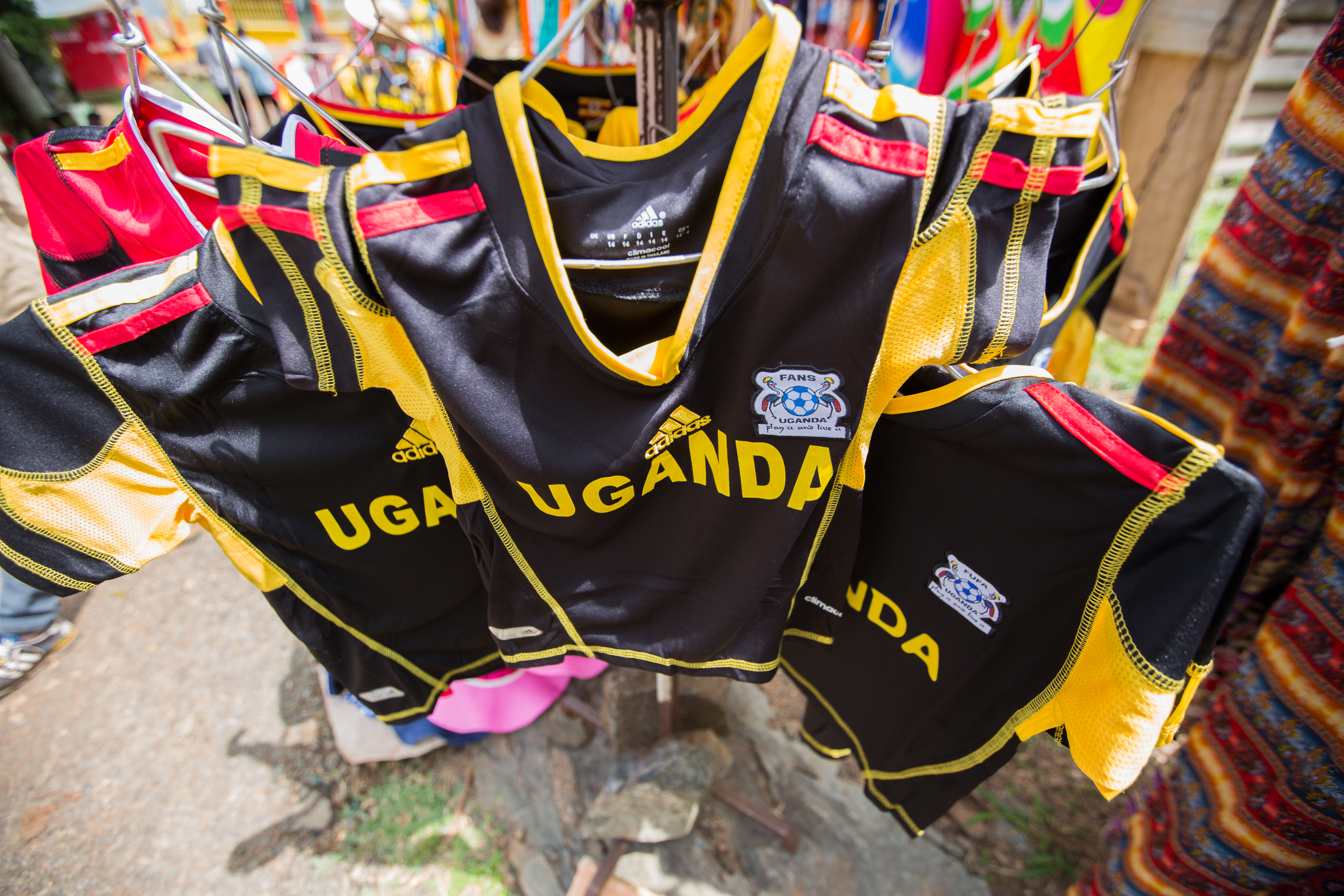
Uganda shirt for 2016

Uganda's traditional home colours are red shirts, black shorts and red or black socks. The team has periodically worn an all-red kit.

=== Home stadium ===
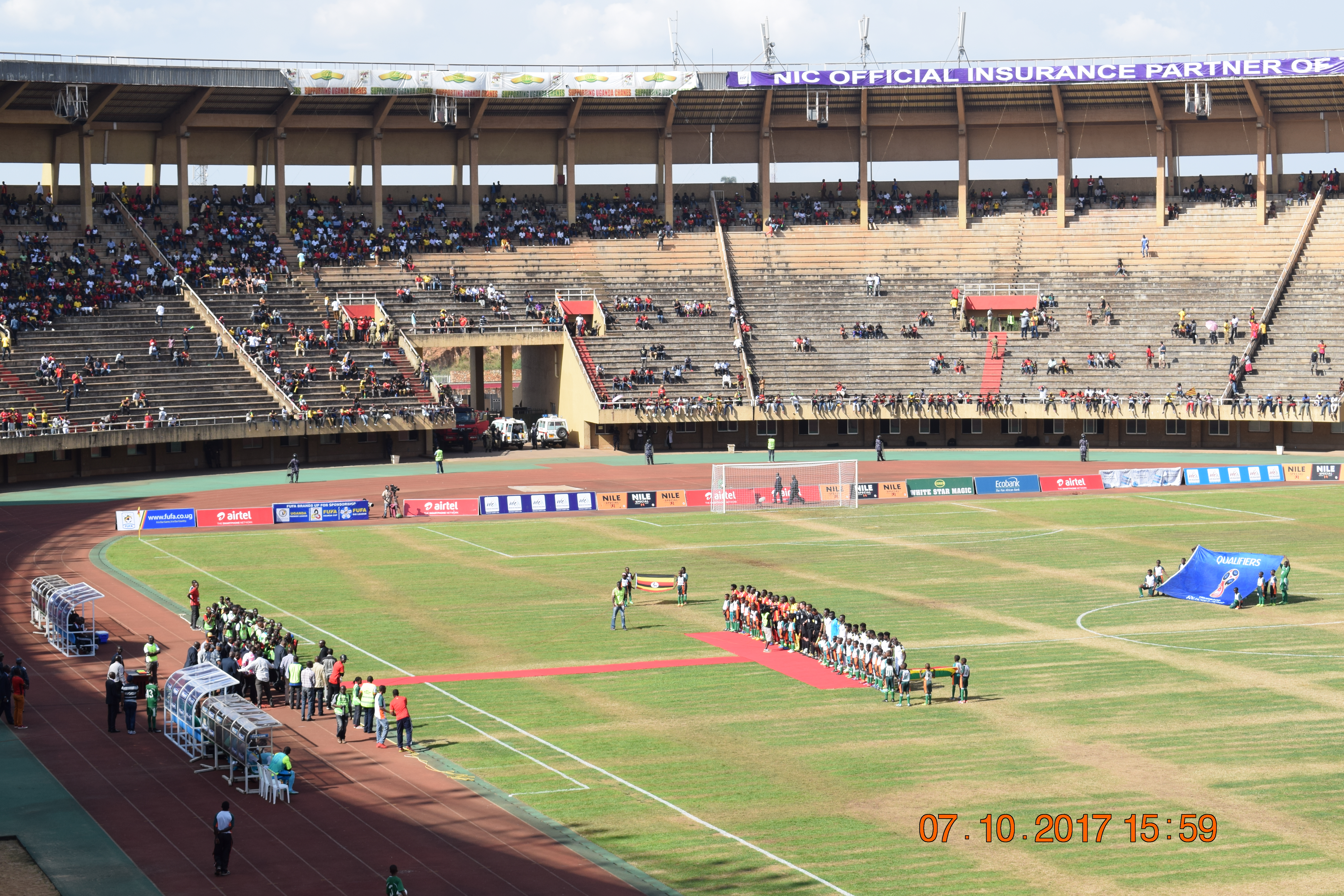
Mandela National Stadium prior to redevelopment

The Mandela National Stadium was closed for renovation in 2019 after the outbreak of COVID-19 after it failed to reach the minimum standards required by the Confederation of African Football (CAF) to host international matches. In 2020, the stadium was blacklisted from hosting football games due to its substandard condition. Reconstruction works, undertaken by the UPDF Engineering Brigade, began in 2022, and included the installation of a permanent seats in the stadium, new dressing rooms, a modern scoreboard, as well as the refurbishment of floodlights and the pitch.

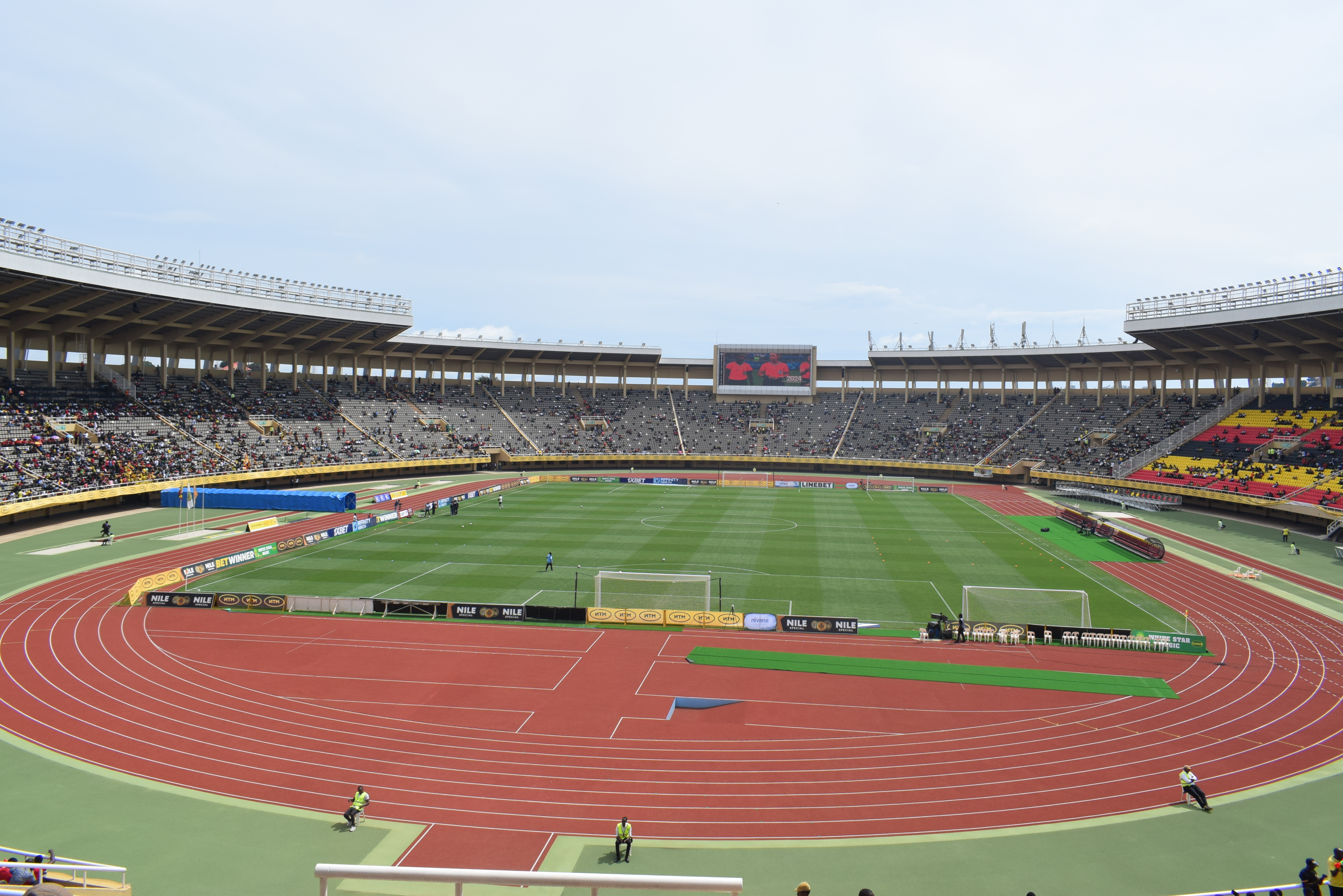
The new redeveloped Mandela National Stadium. View from Section 1 with only the expanded roof and seating yet to be completed

== Results and fixtures ==
The following is a list of match results in the last 12 months, as well as any future matches that have been scheduled.

Win Draw Loss Fixture

=== 2025 ===
14 November Friendly	Uganda	2–1	Chad	Berrechid, Morocco
	Mubiru 20' (pen.); Lorenzen 46'	Report	H. Tchaouna 64' (pen.)	Stadium: Stade Municipal De Berrechid

18 November Friendly	Morocco	4–0	Uganda	Tangier, Morocco
20:00 UTC+1	Achai 4' (o.g.); Saibari 33'; Rahimi 79' (pen.); El Khannouss 88'	Report		Stadium: Ibn Batouta Stadium; Referee: Ousmane Diakate (Mali)

23 December 2025 AFCON GS	Tunisia	3–1	Uganda	Rabat, Morocco
21:00 UTC+1	Skhiri 10'; Achouri 40', 64'	Report	Omedi 90+2'	Stadium: Rabat Olympic Stadium; Referee: Patrice Mebiame (Gabon)

27 December 2025 AFCON GS	Uganda	1–1	Tanzania	Rabat, Morocco
18:30 UTC+1	Ikpeazu 80'	Report	Msuva 59' (pen.)	Stadium: Al Medina Stadium; Attendance: 10,540; Referee: Jalal Jayed (Morocco)

30 December 2025 AFCON GS	Uganda	1–3	Nigeria	Fez, Morocco
17:00 UTC+1	Salim (red card) 56'; Mato 75'	Report	Onuachu 28'; Onyedika 62', 67'	Stadium: Fez Stadium; Referee: Djindo Louis Houngnandande (Benin)

=== 2026 ===
26 March Friendly	Bahrain	Cancelled	Uganda	Antalya, Türkiye
--:-- UTC+3		Report
Note: Match cancelled due to travel disruptions from the 2026 Iran war.

31 March Friendly	Uganda	Cancelled	Madagascar	Antalya, Türkiye
--:-- UTC+3		Report
Note: Match cancelled due to travel disruptions from the 2026 Iran war.

5 June Friendly	Tanzania	Cancelled	Uganda	Marrakesh, Morocco
--:-- UTC+1				Stadium: Marrakesh Stadium

8 June Friendly	Uganda	Cancelled	Madagascar	Marrakesh, Morocco
--:-- UTC+1				Stadium: Marrakesh Stadium

11 June Friendly	Zanzibar	Cancelled	Uganda	Zanzibar
20:15 UTC+3		Report		Stadium: Amaan Stadium
Note: Match cancelled due to health concerns related to Ebola prevention measures.

24 September 2027 AFCON qualification	Tunisia	1–1	Uganda	Tunis, Tunisia
21:00 UTC+0				Stadium: Hammadi Agrebi Stadium

29 September 2027 AFCON qualification	Uganda	1–0	Libya	Hoima, Uganda
18:00 UTC+0				Stadium: TBD

2 October Friendly	DR Congo	0–2	Uganda	Johannesburg, South Africa
			Bogere 7'; Boateng 49'	Stadium: FNB Stadium

11 November 2027 AFCON qualification	Uganda	v	Botswana	TBD, Uganda
TBD				Stadium: TBD

15 November 2027 AFCON qualification	Botswana	v	Uganda	TBD, Botswana
TBD				Stadium: TBD

=== 2027 ===
24 March 2027 AFCON qualification	Uganda	v	Tunisia	TBD, Uganda
TBD				Stadium: TBD

28 March 2027 AFCON qualification	Libya	v	Uganda	TBD, Libya
TBD				Stadium: TBD

== Coaching staff ==
Position	Staff
Head coach	(Belgium) Paul Put
Assistant coach	(Uganda) Sam Ssimbwa
Performance manager	(Belgium) Sven De Wilde
Goalkeeper coach	(Belgium) Gery Oste
Physical coach	(Belgium) Mathieu Denis
Physiotherapist & Fitness coach	(Belgium) Arthur Naudts
Video analyst	(Belgium) Jelle Sevenhant
Team Doctor	(Belgium) Arnaud Depraetere

=== Coaching history ===
Interim coaches are listed in italics.

- (England) Alan Rogers (1965–1966)
- (Uganda) Robert Kiberu (19??–1969, 1988–1989)
- (West Germany) Burkhard Pape (1969–1972)
- (Uganda) David Otti (1973–1974)
- (West Germany) Otto Westerhoff (1974–1975)
- (Uganda) Peter Okee (1976–1981, 1983)
- (Uganda) Jaberi Bidandi Ssali (1982)
- (Uganda) George Mukasa (1984–1985)
- (Uganda) Barnabas Mwesiga (1986–1988)
- (Uganda) Polly Ouma (1989–1995)
- (Uganda) Timothy Ayieko (1995–1996)
- (Uganda) Asuman Lubowa (1996–1999)
- (Uganda) Paul Hasule (1999, 2001–2003)
- (Nigeria) Harrison Okagbue (1999–2001)
- (Argentina) Pedro Pasculli (2003)
- (Uganda) Leo Adraa (2003–2004)
- (Uganda) Mike Mutebi (2004)
- (Egypt) Mohammed Abbas (2004–2006)
- (Hungary) Csaba László (2006–2008)
- (Scotland) Bobby Williamson (2008–2013)
- (Serbia) Milutin Sredojević (2013–2017)
- (Uganda) Moses Basena and (Uganda) Fred Kajoba (2017)
- (France) Sébastien Desabre (2017–2019)
- (Uganda) Abdallah Mubiru (2019, 2021)
- (Northern Ireland) Johnny McKinstry (2019–2021)
- (Serbia) Milutin Sredojević (2021–2023)
- (Uganda) Morley Beyekwaso (2023)
- (Belgium) Paul Put (2023–present)

== Players ==
=== Current squad ===
The following players were called up for the 2027 Africa Cup of Nations qualification matches against Botswana on 14 and 17 November 2026.

Caps and goals are correct as of 5 October 2026, after the match against DR Congo.

No.	Pos.	Player	Date of birth (age)	Caps	Goals	Club
	GK	Denis Onyango	15 May 1985 (age 41)	83	0	(South African Football Association) Mamelodi Sundowns
	GK	Akpan Udoh	18 July 1999 (age 27)	1	0	(Malta Football Association) Mosta
	GK	David Lukwago	10 October 2002 (age 24)	0	0	(Federation of Uganda Football Associations) Villa
	GK	Kingdom Osayi	3 June 2004 (age 22)	0	0	(Swedish Football Association) Assyriska
	DF	Aziz Kayondo	6 October 2002 (age 24)	38	2	(Football Association of the Czech Republic) Slovan Liberec
	DF	Gavin Kizito	14 January 2002 (age 24)	16	0	(Football Kenya Federation) Nairobi United
	DF	Toby Sibbick	23 May 1999 (age 27)	12	0	(The Football Association) Burton Albion
	DF	Rogers Torach	23 June 2003 (age 23)	10	1	(Algerian Football Federation) Constantine
	DF	Hilary Mukundane	22 December 1997 (age 28)	10	0	(Federation of Uganda Football Associations) Vipers
	DF	Herbert Achayi	8 August 1999 (age 27)	9	0	(Federation of Uganda Football Associations) KCCA
	DF	Nathan Asiimwe	29 December 2004 (age 21)	2	0	(The Football Association) Salford City
	DF	Jonathan Odongo	31 January 1998 (age 28)	1	0	(Federation of Uganda Football Associations) Entebbe UPPC
	DF	Herbert Bockhorn	31 January 1995 (age 31)	0	0	(German Football Association) 1. FC Magdeburg
	DF	Toto Majub	3 June 2006 (age 20)	0	0	(United States Soccer Federation) Atlanta United
	MF	Khalid Aucho	8 August 1993 (age 33)	72	2	(Ethiopian Football Federation) Sidama Coffee
	MF	Allan Okello	4 July 2000 (age 26)	38	6	(Royal Moroccan Football Federation) AS FAR
	MF	Kenneth Semakula	14 November 2002 (age 23)	38	0	(Egyptian Football Association) Al Ittihad
	MF	Travis Mutyaba	7 August 2005 (age 21)	31	2	(Tunisian Football Federation) Sfaxien
	MF	Bobosi Byaruhanga	3 December 2001 (age 24)	28	0	(United States Soccer Federation) Oakland Roots
	MF	Baba Alhassan	3 January 2000 (age 26)	7	0	(Turkish Football Federation) Mardin
	MF	Allan Oyirwoth	23 January 2007 (age 19)	7	0	(Scottish Football Association) Dunfermline Athletic
	MF	Abdoulaye Sissako	26 May 1998 (age 28)	1	0	(Royal Belgian Football Association) Sint-Truiden
	MF	Joseph Seremba	5 May 2004 (age 22)	0	0	(Football Kenya Federation) Nairobi United
	FW	Rogers Mato	20 October 1998 (age 28)	41	8	(Scottish Football Association) Heart of Midlothian
	FW	Denis Omedi	13 June 1996 (age 30)	22	4	(Football Kenya Federation) Gor Mahia
	FW	James Bogere	2 February 2008 (age 18)	4	1	(Danish Football Association) AGF
	FW	Frank Ssebuufu	9 September 2001 (age 25)	3	0	(Federation of Uganda Football Associations) Villa
	FW	Kelvin Boateng	24 March 2000 (age 26)	2	1	(Austrian Football Association) Austria Wien
	FW	Arnold Vula	26 March 1999 (age 27)	1	1	(Royal Belgian Football Association) K Beerschot VA
	FW	Sadam Masereka	9 September 2004 (age 22)	0	0	(United States Soccer Federation) Colorado Springs Switchbacks

=== Recent call-ups ===
The following players have been called up in the last 12 months.

Pos.	Player	Date of birth (age)	Caps	Goals	Club	Latest call-up
GK	Hannington Ssebwalunyo	28 May 1989 (age 37)	0	0	(Uganda) NEC	v. DR Congo, 5 October 2026
GK	Joel Mutakubwa	17 July 1994 (age 32)	8	0	(Ethiopia) Welwalo Adigrat University	v. Madagascar, 8 June 2026
GK	Salim Magoola	27 May 1995 (age 31)	17	0	(South Africa) Richards Bay	2025 Africa Cup of Nations
GK	Nafian Alionzi	1 March 1996 (age 30)	8	0	(Ethiopia) Defence Force	2025 Africa Cup of Nations
GK	Charles Lukwago	11 December 1993 (age 32)	24	0	(Uganda) KCCA	2025 Africa Cup of Nations ^{PRE}
DF	Geoffrey Lubanga	10 September 1996 (age 30)	0	0	(Uganda) Villa	v. DR Congo, 5 October 2026
DF	Souleymane Diaby	8 October 1999 (age 27)			(Switzerland) Winterthur	v. DR Congo, 5 October 2026
DF	Jordan Obita	8 December 1993 (age 32)	10	0	(Scotland) Hibernian	v. Madagascar, 8 June 2026
DF	Raymond Barasa	19 November 2007 (age 18)	0	0	(Uganda) Villa	v. Madagascar, 8 June 2026
DF	Isaac Muleme	10 October 1992 (age 34)	49	0	(Czech Republic) Viktoria Žižkov	2025 Africa Cup of Nations
DF	Timothy Awany	6 August 1996 (age 30)	40	0	(Bulgaria) Botev Plovdiv	2025 Africa Cup of Nations
DF	Elio Capradossi	11 March 1996 (age 30)	11	1	(Romania) Universitatea Cluj	2025 Africa Cup of Nations
MF	Noble Okello	20 July 2000 (age 26)	2	0	(United States) Lexington	v. DR Congo, 5 October 2026
MF	Dieudonné Gaucho Debohi	15 January 2001 (age 25)			(Poland) Raków Częstochowa	v. DR Congo, 5 October 2026
MF	Abdul Karim Watambala	3 March 2000 (age 26)	23	0	(Uganda) Vipers	v. Madagascar, 8 June 2026
MF	Ronald Ssekiganda	13 September 1995 (age 31)	12	1	(Rwanda) APR	2025 Africa Cup of Nations
MF	David Owori	23 September 1998 (age 28)	0	0	Deceased	2025 Africa Cup of Nations ^{PRE}
FW	Steven Mukwala	15 July 1999 (age 27)	30	2	(Libya) Al Nasr	v. DR Congo, 5 October 2026
FW	Richard Basangwa	17 December 2001 (age 24)	9	1	(Uganda) NEC	v. DR Congo, 5 October 2026
FW	Hassan Mubiru	25 July 2004 (age 22)	0	0	(Tanzania) Azam	v. DR Congo, 5 October 2026
FW	Ivan Ahimbisibwe	18 March 2000 (age 26)	4	1	(Iraq) Zakho	v. Madagascar, 8 June 2026
FW	Arafat Kiza Usama	27 June 2004 (age 22)	4	0	(Uganda) Vipers	v. Madagascar, 8 June 2026
FW	Sammy Ssebaduka	30 December 2002 (age 23)	0	0	(Uganda) KCCA	v. Madagascar, 8 June 2026
FW	Jude Ssemugabi	3 March 1997 (age 29)	18	4	(South Sudan) Jamus	2025 Africa Cup of Nations
FW	Reagan Mpande	7 May 2000 (age 26)	7	1	(Uganda) Villa	2025 Africa Cup of Nations
FW	Uche Ikpeazu	28 February 1995 (age 31)	6	1	(Scotland) Ross County	2025 Africa Cup of Nations
FW	Melvyn Lorenzen	26 November 1994 (age 31)	3	0	(Indonesia) Sleman	2025 Africa Cup of Nations
FW	Shafik Nana Kwikiriza	3 March 2004 (age 22)	1	0	(Uganda) KCCA	2025 Africa Cup of Nations

== Individual records ==
As of 30 December 2025
Players in bold are still active with Uganda.

Most appearances
Rank	Player	Caps	Goals	Career
1	Godfrey Walusimbi	105	3	2009–2019
2	Emmanuel Okwi	95	28	2009–2023
3	Simeon Masaba	88	6	2002–2013
4	**Denis Onyango**	87	0	2005–present
5	Tony Mawejje	86	8	2003–2018
6	**Khalid Aucho**	83	2	2013–present
7	Hassan Wasswa	81	0	2006–2019
8	Farouk Miya	79	23	2014–2023
9	Andrew Mwesigwa	75	7	2003–2014
10	Geoffrey Massa	72	22	2005–2017

Top goalscorers
Rank	Player	Goals	Caps	Ratio	Career
1	Emmanuel Okwi	28	95	0.29	2009–2023
2	Ali Kitonsa	25	30	0.83	1961–1972
3	Farouk Miya	23	79	0.29	2014–2023
4	Geoffrey Massa	22	72	0.31	2005–2017
5	Majid Musisi	20	29	0.69	1987–2000
6	Hassan Mubiru	18	63	0.29	1998–2007
7	David Obua	16	36	0.44	2003–2011
8	Geoffrey Sserunkuma	14	54	0.26	2002–2017
9	Brian Umony	12	36	0.33	2009–2015
10	Jackson Mayanja	10	27	0.37	1988–1999

== Competitive record ==
=== FIFA World Cup ===
FIFA World Cup record									Qualification record					
Year	Round	Position	Pld	W	D*	L	GF	GA	Pld	W	D	L	GF	GA
1930 to 1958	Not a FIFA member								Not a FIFA member					
1962 to 1974	Did not enter								Did not enter					
(Argentina) 1978	Did not qualify								2	1	0	1	3	4
(Spain) 1982	Withdrew								Withdrew					
(Mexico) 1986	Did not qualify								2	1	0	1	1	3
(Italy) 1990	Did not qualify								2	1	0	1	2	3
(United States) 1994	Withdrew during qualifying								Withdrew during qualifying					
(France) 1998	Did not qualify								2	0	0	2	1	5
(South Korea) (Japan) 2002	Did not qualify								2	0	1	1	4	7
(Germany) 2006	Did not qualify								12	3	2	7	10	18
(South Africa) 2010	Did not qualify								6	3	1	2	8	9
(Brazil) 2014	Did not qualify								6	2	2	2	5	6
(Russia) 2018	Did not qualify								8	4	3	1	7	2
(Qatar) 2022	Did not qualify								6	2	3	1	3	2
(Canada) (Mexico) (United States) 2026	Did not qualify								10	6	0	4	14	9
(Morocco) (Portugal) (Spain) 2030	To be determined								To be determined					
(Saudi Arabia) 2034	To be determined								To be determined					
Total									58	23	12	23	58	68

=== Africa Cup of Nations ===
Africa Cup of Nations record
Year	Round	Position	Pld	W	D*	L	GF	GA
(Sudan) 1957	Not affiliated to CAF							
(United Arab Republic) 1959	Not affiliated to CAF							
(Ethiopia) 1962	Fourth place	4th	2	0	0	2	1	5
(Ghana) 1963	Withdrew							
(Tunisia) 1965	Did not qualify							
(Ethiopia) 1968	Group stage	8th	3	0	0	3	2	8
(Sudan) 1970	Did not qualify							
(Cameroon) 1972	Did not qualify							
(Egypt) 1974	Group stage	6th	3	0	1	2	3	5
(Ethiopia) 1976	Group stage	8th	3	0	0	3	2	6
(Ghana) 1978	Runners-up	2nd	5	3	0	2	9	7
(Nigeria) 1980	Withdrew							
(Libya) 1982	Withdrew							
(Ivory Coast) 1984	Did not qualify							
(Egypt) 1986	Did not qualify							
(Morocco) 1988	Did not qualify							
(Algeria) 1990	Withdrew							
(Senegal) 1992 to (Equatorial Guinea) 2015	Did not qualify							
(Gabon) 2017	Group stage	13th	3	0	1	2	1	3
(Egypt) 2019	Round of 16	13th	4	1	1	2	3	4
(Cameroon) 2021	Did not qualify							
(Ivory Coast) 2023	Did not qualify							
(Morocco) 2025	Group stage	21st	3	0	1	2	3	7
(Kenya) (Tanzania) (Uganda) 2027	Qualified as co-hosts							
Total	Runners-up	8/35	26	4	4	18	24	45

=== African Nations Championship ===
African Nations Championship record
Year	Round	Position	Pld	W	D*	L	GF	GA
(Ivory Coast) 2009	Did not qualify							
(Sudan) 2011	Group stage	15th	3	0	0	3	1	5
(South Africa) 2014	Group stage	12th	3	1	1	1	3	4
(Rwanda) 2016	Group stage	12th	3	0	2	1	3	4
(Morocco) 2018	Group stage	12th	3	0	1	2	1	4
(Cameroon) 2020	Group stage	14th	3	0	1	2	3	7
(Algeria) 2022	Group stage	11th	3	1	1	1	2	3
(Kenya) (Tanzania) (Uganda) 2024	Quarter-finals	8th	5	2	1	2	8	7
Total	Quarter-finals	7/8	23	4	7	12	21	34

=== African Games ===
Year	Round	Pld	W	D	L	GF	GA
(Republic of the Congo) 1965	6th place	5	1	1	3	10	14
1973–1987	Did not enter						
Total	-	5	1	1	3	10	14

=== CECAFA Cup ===
(1973–2023)

- CECAFA Cup – (gold) Gold medal 15 times
- CECAFA Cup – (silver) Silver medal 5 times
- CECAFA Cup – (bronze) Bronze medal 7 times

=== Other tournaments ===
Year	Round
(Kuwait) 1989 Peace and Friendship Cup	Runners-up
(Uganda) 1962 Ugandan Independence Tournament	Runners-up

=== Head-to-head record ===
Completely updated and corrected per the cited source on 30 December 2025

Against	Played	Won	Drawn	Lost	GF	GA	GD
Algeria	14	2	4	8	11	24	−13
Angola	8	3	2	3	10	10	0
Benin	2	1	0	1	3	5	−2
Bahrain	2	0	1	1	1	3	–2
Botswana	7	5	2	0	9	2	+7
Burkina Faso	8	1	5	2	4	6	−2
Burundi	16	10	3	3	27	10	+17
Cameroon	7	1	3	3	7	14	−7
Central African Republic	1	0	0	1	0	1	−1
Cape Verde	4	3	0	1	3	1	+2
Chad	1	1	0	0	2	0	+2
Comoros	3	2	0	1	2	4	–2
Congo	8	5	1	2	14	7	+7
DR Congo	14	5	2	7	10	23	−13
Djibouti	5	5	0	0	34	3	+31
Ecuador	1	1	0	0	2	1	+1
Egypt	19	2	2	15	13	36	−23
Eritrea	5	4	0	1	12	4	+8
Ethiopia	33	14	9	10	47	39	+8
Gabon	2	0	1	1	0	1	−1
Gambia	2	0	2	0	2	2	0
Ghana	13	3	6	4	10	13	−3
Guinea	9	4	1	4	15	14	+1
Guinea-Bissau	2	2	0	0	3	0	+3
Iceland	1	0	1	0	1	1	0
Iran	1	0	1	0	2	2	0
Iraq	2	0	1	2	2	3	–1
Ivory Coast	5	1	2	2	5	7	–2
Kenya	55	19	26	11	62	58	+4
Kuwait	2	1	1	0	3	1	+2
Lebanon	2	1	1	0	2	0	+2
Lesotho	5	3	2	0	8	0	+8
Liberia	4	2	0	2	2	4	−2
Libya	3	1	1	1	6	6	0
Madagascar	6	3	0	3	10	6	+4
Malawi	29	12	8	9	33	30	+3
Mali	7	0	4	3	4	10	−6
Mauritania	3	3	0	0	6	0	+6
Mauritius	5	3	1	1	13	5	+8
Morocco	5	2	0	3	7	12	–5
Moldova	1	1	0	0	3	2	+1
Mozambique	2	1	0	1	5	3	+2
Namibia	1	0	0	1	0	1	−1
Niger	10	5	2	3	14	9	+5
Nigeria	9	4	2	3	7	8	–1
Rwanda	35	15	11	9	43	26	+17
São Tomé and Príncipe	1	1	0	0	3	1	+2
Saudi Arabia	2	0	1	1	1	3	−2
Senegal	8	2	2	4	5	9	−4
Seychelles	3	3	0	0	8	2	+6
Somalia	24	20	3	1	71	9	+62
South Africa	8	0	3	5	11	16	−5
South Sudan	8	6	1	1	20	6	+14
Sudan	24	12	8	4	35	20	+15
Tajikistan	1	0	1	0	1	1	0
Tanzania	62	33	18	11	101	56	+45
Togo	9	2	1	6	6	12	−6
Tunisia	6	0	0	6	2	19	−17
Turkmenistan	1	0	1	0	0	0	0
Uzbekistan	1	0	0	1	2	4	–2
Yemen	1	0	1	0	2	2	0
Zambia	38	12	7	19	41	51	-10
Zanzibar	1	0	0	1	1	2	-1
Zimbabwe	16	2	9	5	11	14	−3
Total	593	244	162	187	794	641	+153

Note: Country in italic is not a member of FIFA.

== Honours ==
=== Continental ===
- CAF African Cup of Nations
  - (silver) Runners-up (1): 1978

=== Regional ===
- CECAFA Cup
  - (gold) Champions (15): 1973, 1976, 1977, 1989, 1990, 1992, 1996, 2000, 2003, 2008, 2009, 2011, 2012, 2015, 2019
  - (silver) Runners-up (5): 1974, 1982, 1994, 1995, 2000
  - (bronze) Third place (7): 1983, 1984, 1987, 1991, 2007, 2010, 2017

=== Friendly ===
- Gossage Cup / Challenge Cup (25): 1928, 1929, 1930, 1932, 1935, 1936, 1937, 1938, 1939, 1940, 1943, 1945, 1947, 1948, 1952, 1954, 1955, 1956, 1957, 1960 (shared), 1962, 1963, 1968, 1969, 1970

=== Awards ===
- African National Team of the Year (1): 2016

=== Summary ===
Competition	1st place, gold medalist(s)	2nd place, silver medalist(s)	3rd place, bronze medalist(s)	Total
CAF African Cup of Nations	0	1	0	1
Total	0	1	0	1
