= SC Villa =

Association football club in Uganda

Villa
- Full name: Sports Club Villa
- Nickname: The Jogoos
- Founded: 1975; 51 years ago
- Stadium: Kadiba Stadium
- Capacity: 10,000
- Chairman: Kingsley Kaggwa
- Manager: Željko Kovačević
- League: Uganda Premier League
- 2025–26: 3rd of 16
- Website: https://scvilla.co.ug/
Home colours	Away colours

Sports Club Villa is a professional football club based in Kampala, Uganda, that competes in the Uganda Premier League.

== Overview ==
Sports Club Villa had humble beginnings in 1975, playing under the name Nakivubo Boys. The club was renamed Nakivubo Villa in 1981 and is a professional football club based in Kampala, Uganda, that competes in the Uganda Premier League.

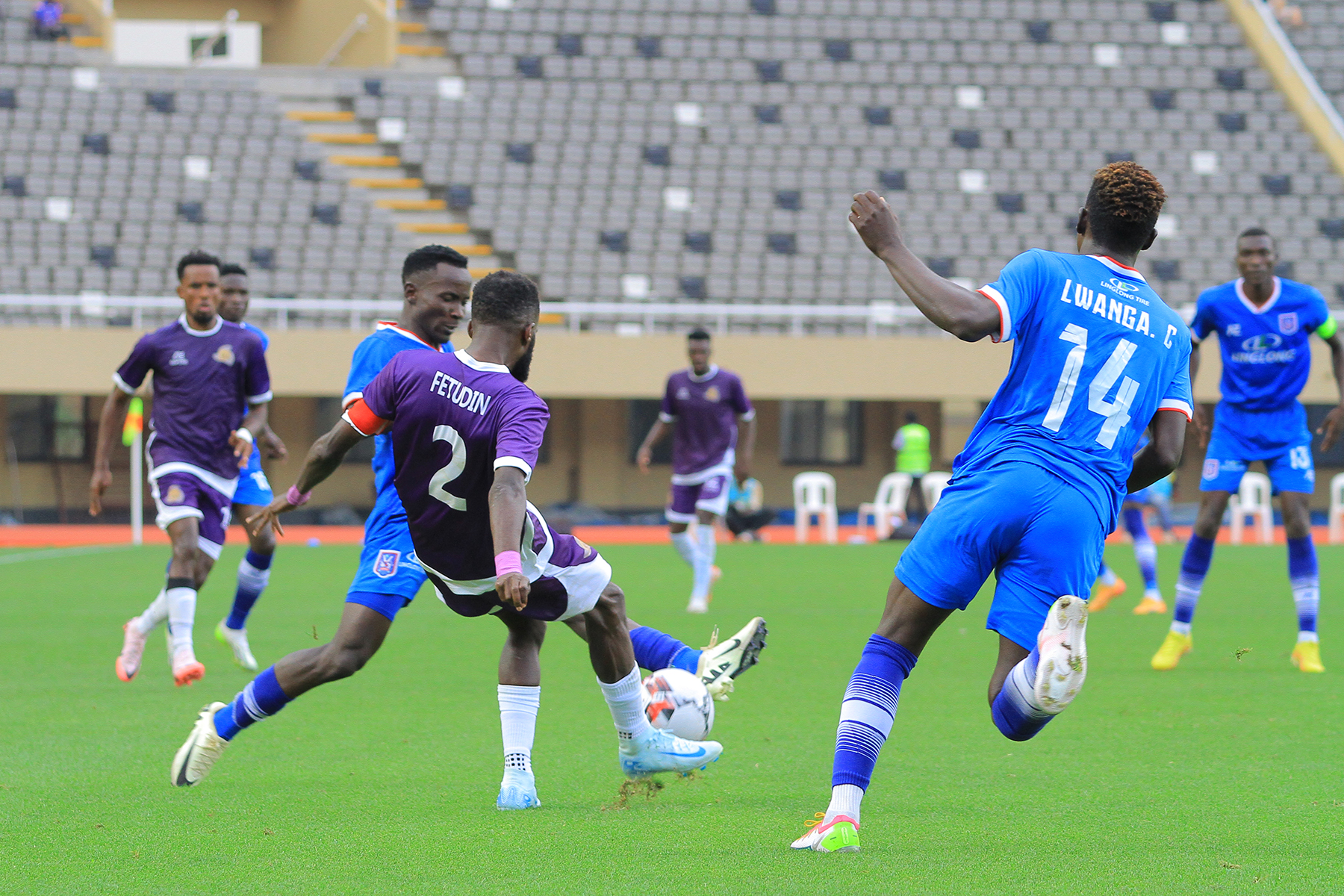
SC Villa Vs CBE SA in CAF Champions League first preliminary round 1 at Nakivubo Stadium.

SC Villa had won promotion to the topflight of Ugandan football in 1979 and has won 17 Uganda Super League Titles, 9 Ugandan Cup Titles and 3 CECAFA Clubs Cup Titles. Today there is no single local or regional trophy on which SC Villa's name is not inscribed, thus the most successful club in Ugandan football history. The club trains at East High Grounds in Kisaasi, Kampala.

== Team image ==
=== Name history ===
- 1975–1979: Nakivubo Boys
- 1980: Nakivubo Villa
- 1981–Present: Sports Club Villa

== Club legal owners ==
- Villa Members' Trust

== Past patrons ==
- Kezekiah Ssegwanga Musisi
- George Faison Ddamulira
- Henry Balamaze Lwanga
- Gerrald Kasozi
- Franco Mugabe (Current)

== Board of Trustees ==
- Gerrald Ssendawula
- McDusman Kabega
- Omar Ahmed
- Franco Mugabe
- Fredrick Ivan Kawuma
- Moses Matovu
- William Nkemba

== Past presidents ==
1. 1975 - 1979 : Daniel Musoke Kiwalabye (Assumed office as Founding Chairperson of Nakivubo Boys)

2. 1979 - Dec 1993 : Patrick Edward Kawooya (Assumed office through consensus with founding members)

3. Dec 1993 - July 2010 : Franco Mugabe (Assumed office through Club Delegates' Election)

4. Aug 2010 - Jul 2012 : Fred Muwema (Assumed office through Club Elders' Appointment)

5. Aug 2012 - Jul 2014 : Salim Ssemanda (Assumed office through Club Elders' Appointment on Interim Basis)

6. Aug 2014 - Jul 2018 : Ben Immanuel Misagga (Assumed office through Club Delegates' Election)

7. Jul 2018 - Nov 2021 : William Nkemba (Assumed office through Club Elders' Appointment on Interim Basis)

8. Nov 2021 - To date : Omar Ahmed (Assumed office through Villa Members' Trust Club Election)

== Current Club Executive Committee Members ==
Name	Role
Omar Ahmed	President
William Nkemba	CEO
Daniel Bakaki	Senior Vice President
Salim SSemanda	Vice President Fan Mobilization
Baker Mugano	Vice President Administration
Sam Mubiru	Vice President Technical
Isaac Walukagga	ExCom member in charge of legal and constitutional affairs
Asan Kasingye	ExCom member and Villa spokesperson
Sarah Adong	ExCom member in charge of women affairs
Khasim Nziraguhanga	Secretary General

== Club Record in the Top Tier ==
Season	Tier	League	Pos.	Pl.	W	D	L	GS	GA	Pts	
1979	1	Uganda National League	9th	26	7	8	11	28	32	22	
1980	1	Uganda National League	8th	30	11	9	10	40	36	31	
1981	1	Uganda National League	2nd	32	20	7	5	68	32	47	
1982	1	Uganda Super League	1st	17	11	6	0	30	9	28	Champions
1983	1	Uganda Super League	6th	22	12	6	4	35	15	30	
1984	1	Uganda Super League	1st	30	24	5	1	74	19	53	Champions
1985	1	Uganda Super League	3rd	26	17	5	4	52	21	39	
1986	1	Uganda Super League	1st	28	22	5	1	69	12	49	Champions
1987	1	Uganda Super League	1st	22	17	5	0	56	13	39	Champions
1988	1	Uganda Super League	1st								Champions
1989	1	Uganda Super League	1st	22	16	4	2	47	10	36	Champions
1990	1	Uganda Super League	1st	22	16	5	1	50	8	37	Champions
1991	1	Uganda Super League	2nd	19	14	5	0	40	7	33	
1992	1	Uganda Super League	1st	26	22	3	1	68	11	47	Champions
1993	1	Uganda Super League	2nd	28	19	7	2	53	11	45	
1994	1	Uganda Super League	1st	28	20	7	1	53	16	67	Champions
1995	1	Uganda Super League	3rd	28	15	7	6	41	19	52	
1996	1	Uganda Super League	3rd	30	19	8	3	40	16	65	
1997	1	Uganda Super League	4th	30	21	8	1	54	18	71	
1998	1	Uganda Super League	1st	21	14	3	4	43	12	45	Champions
1999	1	Uganda Super League	1st	38	29	7	2	108	22	94	Champions
2000	1	Uganda Super League	1st	30	24	3	3	87	19	75	Champions
2001	1	Uganda Super League	1st	28	22	4	2	65	20	70	Champions
2002	1	Uganda Super League	1st	28	26	1	1	62	9	79	Champions
2002–03	1	Uganda Super League	1st	27	23	3	1	53	4	72	Champions
2004	1	Uganda Super League	1st	29	21	4	4	47	12	67	Champions
2005	1	Uganda Super League; Group A	1st	8	6	2	0	11	1	20	
2006	1	Uganda Super League	5th	28	13	10	5	39	19	49	
2006–07	1	Uganda Super League	2nd	32	19	8	5	49	20	65	
2007–08	1	Uganda Super League	2nd	34	20	9	5	52	24	69	
2008–09	1	Uganda Super League	3rd	34	21	9	4	57	22	72	
2009–10	1	Uganda Super League	7th	34	12	15	7	32	27	45	
2010–11	1	Uganda Super League	6th	26	9	12	5	22	11	39	
2011–12	1	Uganda Super League	5th	28	12	9	7	25	20	45	
2012–13	1	Uganda Super League	4th	30	13	8	9	36	31	47	
2013–14	1	Uganda Super League	7th	30	11	11	8	33	34	44	
2014–15	1	Uganda Premier League	2nd	30	19	8	3	50	18	65	
2015–16	1	Uganda Premier League	4th	30	13	11	6	36	23	50	
2016–17	1	Uganda Premier League	2nd	30	16	10	4	46	26	58	
2017–18	1	Uganda Premier League	3rd	30	16	9	5	28	12	55	
2018–19	1	Uganda Premier League	12th	30	7	13	10	38	37	34	
2019–20	1	Uganda Premier League	3rd	25	13	7	5	33	21	46	
2020–21	1	Uganda Premier League	10th	27	9	9	9	29	30	36	
2021–22	1	Uganda Premier League	12th	30	8	10	12	27	32	33	
2022–23	1	Uganda Premier League	3rd	28	17	3	8	27	20	52	
2023–24	1	Uganda Premier League	1st	29	16	4	9	40	21	57	Champions

== Players ==
=== First-team squad ===
Note: Flags indicate national team as defined under FIFA eligibility rules; some limited exceptions apply. Players may hold more than one non-FIFA nationality.

No.	Pos.	Nation	Player
1	GK	UGA	Hassan Matovu
2	DF	UGA	Arnold Odong
3	DF	UGA	Jordan Mugeere
4	DF	UGA	Geoffrey Lubangakene
5	FW	UGA	Reagan Mpande
6	DF	UGA	Simon Ssemayange
7	MF	UGA	Daniel Onyango
8	MF	UGA	Joel Munanira
9	FW	UGA	Frank Ssebuufu
10	MF	UGA	Jonah Patrick Kakande
12	MF	UGA	Ibrahim Kasinde
13	MF	UGA	Gilbert Ogenrwot
14	MF	UGA	John Asiimwe
16	FW	UGA	Martin Mamer
17	MF	UGA	Najib Yiga
18	MF	UGA	Ibrahim Mubiru

No.	Pos.	Nation	Player
19	MF	UGA	Tonny Asiku
20	MF	UGA	Geoffrey Gaganga
21	FW	UGA	Andrew Otim
22	MF	UGA	Aslam Semakula
23	GK	UGA	David Lukwago
24	GK	UGA	Muhammed Menya
25	MF	UGA	Martin Kibuuka
26	MF	UGA	Jonathan Sausa
27	DF	UGA	Raymong Barasa Mangoli
30	MF	UGA	Stephen Mugisha
32	FW	UGA	Isaac Gumperom
33	MF	UGA	Ukasha Kato
36	MF	UGA	Isaac Mpagi
38	DF	UGA	Andrew Okumu
39	DF	UGA	Tonny Ssendi
40	FW	UGA	Dennis Ojara

== Head coaches since 1975 ==
Updated: July 2023

- (Uganda) Joseph Kabundi (1975–1977)
- (Uganda) Fred Sekasi (1977–1978)
- (Uganda) Charles Jaggwe (1978–1981)
- (Uganda) George Mukasa (1981–1983)
- (Uganda) David Otti (1983–1985)
- (Uganda) Timothy Ayiekoh (1985)
- (Uganda) Polly Ouma (1986–1988)
- (United Kingdom) Geoff Hudson (1988–1991)
- (Uganda) Timothy Ayiekoh (1992–1994)
- (Uganda) David Otti (1995)
- (Uganda) Timothy Ayiekoh (1995–1996)
- (Uganda) Eddie Butindo (1996)
- (Uganda) David Otti (1997)
- (Uganda) Paul Edwin Hasule (1998–2001)
- (Uganda) Paul Nkata (2001)
- (Uganda) Moses Basena (2002)
- (Serbia) Milutin Sredojević (2002–2004)
- (Uganda) Sam Timbe (2004–2006)
- (Uganda) Ibrahim Kirya (2006)
- (Uganda) Asuman Lubowa (2006–2008)
- (Uganda) Sula Kato (2008–2010)
- (Serbia) Srđjan Živojnov (2010–2011)
- (Uganda) Mike Mutebi (2011–2012)
- (Uganda) Paul Nkata (2012–2013)
- (Uganda) Hussein Mbalangu (2013)
- (Uganda) Steven Bogere (2013–2014)
- (Uganda) Sam Ssimbwa (2014–2015)
- (Spain) Antonio Flores (2015)
- (Uganda) Ibrahim Kirya (2015–2016)
- (Uganda) Deo Sserwadda (2016)
- (Uganda) Shafik Bisaso (2016–2017)
- (Uganda) Wasswa Bbossa (2017–2018)
- (Uganda) Moses Basena (2018)
- (Uganda) Douglas Bamweyana (2018–2019)
- (Uganda) Edward Kaziba (2019–2021)
- (Greece) Petros Koukouras (2021–2022)
- (Uganda) Jackson Magera (2022–2023)
- (Serbia) Dušan Stojanović (2023–2024)
- (Uganda) Morley Byekwaso (2024–2025)
- (Serbia) Željko Kovačević (2025–present)

== Honours ==
Updated: May 2024

- Ugandan Premier League: 17

Champions: 1982, 1984, 1986, 1987, 1988, 1989, 1990, 1992, 1994, 1998, 1999, 2000, 2001, 2002, 2003, 2004, 2023–24
Runner-up: 1981, 1991, 1993, 2007, 2008, 2015, 2017

- Ugandan Cup: 9

Winner: 1983, 1986, 1988, 1989, 1998, 2000, 2002, 2009, 2015
Runner-Up: 1987, 1990, 2001

- CECAFA Clubs Cup: 3

1987, 2003, 2005

== Performance in CAF Competitions ==
Updated: August 2024

- African Cup of Champions Clubs: 6 Appearances

1983 – Quarter-Finals
1985 – First Round
1987 – Second Round
1988 – Second Round
1991 – Finalist
1993 – Quarter-Finals

- CAF Champions League: 8 Appearances

1999 – Second Round
2000 – Preliminary Round
2001 – Second Round
2002 – First Round
2003 – First Round
2004 – First Round
2005 – First Round
2024 – First Round

- CAF Confederation Cup: 2 Appearances

2010 – Preliminary Round
2016 – Second Round

- CAF Cup: 2 Appearances

1992 – Finalist
1994 – Disqualified in First Round

- CAF Cup Winners' Cup: 3 Appearances

1984 – Quarter-Finals
1989 – First Round
1990 – First Round

== Notable players ==
Updated: August 2024

- Paul Hasule (Most Decorated Player)
- Abbey Mutanda
- Mike Mukasa
- Jamil Kasirye
- Geoffrey Kisitu
- Shaban Mwinda
- Moses Ndaula
- Rogers Nsubuga
- Davis Kamoga
- Livingstone Kyobe
- Dan Kitalo
- Zaid Tebesiggwa
- Edward Nansamba
- Ronald Vvubya
- Sunday Mokili
- Godfrey Kateregga
- Sam Mubiru
- Twaha Kivumbi
- Sula Kato
- William Nkemba
- Stephen Bogere
- George Otto
- Joseph Dramiga
- Adam Semugabi
- Idi Batambuze
- Robert Semakula
- Enock Kyembe
- Said Abedi
- Adam Semugabi
- Charles Katumba
- John Kawesi
- Yusuf Ssonko
- Issa Kawooya
- Alex Olum
- Robert Ssemakula
- Paul Mukatabala
- Magid Musisi
- Wilson Nsobya
- Sam Tamale
- George Mukasa
- Timothy Ayiekoh
- Hakim Magumba
- Andy Mwesigwa
- Edgar Watson
- Hassan Mubiru
- Denis Onyango
- Andrew Mukasa
- Mathias Kaweesa
- Ali Kayongo
- Isaac Kirabira
- Steven Bengo
- Emmanuel Okwi
- Geofrey Bukohore
- Godfrey Walusimbi
- Tonny Ndolo
- Timothy Batabaire
- Kenneth Semakula
