= 2016–17 Uganda Premier League =

Football season in Uganda

Ugandan Super League
- Season: 2016–17
- Champions: KCCA
- Relegated: JMC Hippos; Lweza; Sadolin Paints
- 2018 CAF Champions League: KCCA
- Matches: 240
- Goals: 515 (2.15 per match)
- Top goalscorer: Geoffrey Sserunkuma (20)
- Biggest home win: KCCA 7-0 Onduparaka (25 February 2017)
- Biggest away win: 4 matches: Police 0-3 Soana (20 September 2016); BUL 0-3 Soana (3 December 2016); Express 0-3 Proline (9 May 2017); JMC Hippos 0-3 Police (16 May 2017)
- Highest scoring: SC Villa 5-3 Bright Stars (15 November 2016)
- Longest winning run: KCCA (6)
- Longest unbeaten run: SC Villa (12)
- Longest winless run: JMC Hippos (30)
- Longest losing run: JMC Hippos (7)
- All statistics correct as of 20 May 2017.

The 2016–17 Ugandan Super League was the 50th season of top-flight football in Uganda. The season began on 19 August 2016. Kampala Capital City Authority FC (KCCA) won their second consecutive league title and 12th overall with two weeks to spare.

== Teams ==
The league consisted of 16 teams with Kirinya-Jinja SSS FC, Onduparaka FC, and Proline FC being promoted from the 2015-16 FUFA Big League. Maroons FC, SC Victoria University, and Simba FC were relegated after finishing in the bottom three spots in 2015–16.

=== Stadiums and locations ===
Team	Home city	Stadium	Capacity	2015–16 season
Bul FC	Jinja	Kakindu Municipal Stadium	1,000	6th in Ugandan Super League
Bright Stars FC	Matugga	Champions Stadium	3,000	12th in Ugandan Super League
Express FC	Kampala	Mutesa II Stadium	20,200	3rd in Ugandan Super League
Jinja Municipal Council Hippos FC	Jinja	Kakindu Municipal Stadium	1,000	10th in Ugandan Super League
Kirinya-Jinja SSS FC	Jinja	Kyabazinga Stadium (Bugembe)	3,000	FUFA Big League
Kampala Capital City Authority FC	Lugogo	Phillip Omondi Stadium	5,600	Ugandan Super League Champions
Lweza FC	Kampala	Mutesa II Stadium	20,200	13th in Ugandan Super League
Onduparaka FC	Arua	Green Light Stadium		FUFA Big League
Police FC	Wakiso	Kavumba Recreation Centre	1,000	8th in Ugandan Super League
Proline FC	Kampala	Lugogo Stadium	3,000	FUFA Big League
SC Villa	Kampala	Nakivubo Stadium	15,000	4th in Ugandan Super League
Sadolin Paints FC	Bugembe	Kyabazinga Stadium	3,000	9th in Ugandan Super League
Soana FC	Wakiso	Kavumba Recreation Centre	1,000	7th in Ugandan Super League
The Saints FC	Kampala	Mandela National Stadium	45,202	11th in Ugandan Super League
Uganda Revenue Authority SC	Lugazi	Mehta Stadium	1,000	5th in Ugandan Super League
Vipers SC	Kitende	St. Mary's Stadium	20,000	2nd in Ugandan Super League

== League table ==
Pos	Team	Pld	W	D	L	GF	GA	GD	Pts	Qualification or relegation
1	KCCA (C, Q)	30	20	6	4	59	25	+34	66	2018 CAF Champions League
2	SC Villa	30	16	10	4	46	26	+20	58	
3	Vipers	30	14	10	6	35	18	+17	52	
4	URA	30	11	15	4	39	25	+14	48	
5	Onduparaka FC	30	11	12	7	33	41	−8	45	
6	Express	30	11	11	8	39	37	+2	44	
7	Soana	30	11	10	9	35	33	+2	43	
8	Proline	30	8	15	7	40	39	+1	39	
9	Bright Stars	30	6	16	8	25	28	−3	34	
10	Kirinya-Jinja	30	6	15	9	20	22	−2	33	
11	BUL	30	8	9	13	27	32	−5	33	
12	The Saints	30	8	9	13	26	35	−9	33	
13	Police	30	8	9	13	29	40	−11	33	
14	Lweza (R)	30	6	14	10	27	32	−5	32	Relegation to 2017-18 Big League
15	Sadolin Paints FC (R)	30	5	11	14	17	30	−13	26	Relegation to 2017-18 Big League
16	JMC Hippos (R)	30	0	10	20	18	52	−34	10	Relegation to 2017-18 Big League

Updated to match(es) played on 20 May 2017. Source: Soccerway.com
Rules for classification: 1) points; 2) goal difference; 3) goals scored; 4) head-to-head points; 5) head-to-head goal difference; 6) head-to-head goals scored; 7) playoff
(C) Champions; (Q) Qualified for the phase indicated; (R) Relegated

== Positions by round ==
Leader
Relegation to regional groups

Team ╲ Round	1	2	3	4	5	6	7	8	9	10	11	12	13	14	15	16	17	18	19	20	21	22	23	24	25	26	27	28	29	30
KCCA	1	1	1	1	1	1	1	1	1	1	1	1	1	1	1	1	1	1	1	1	1	2	2	2	2	1	1	1	1	1
SC Villa	5	5	2	3	2	2	2	4	4	3	2	2	2	2	2	2	2	2	2	2	2	1	1	1	1	2	2	2	2	2
Vipers	3	2	3	2	4	5	3	2	2	2	3	3	5	5	4	3	3	4	4	4	5	5	4	5	6	5	3	3	3	3
URA	5	8	8	6	7	8	9	9	7	5	5	6	6	6	6	4	5	7	5	5	3	3	3	3	3	3	4	4	4	4
Onduparaka	5	13	13	8	8	7	8	5	8	8	8	5	4	4	3	5	4	3	3	3	4	4	5	4	5	6	5	5	5	5
Express	1	6	4	4	6	4	5	6	6	7	7	8	8	7	8	8	8	8	8	9	7	6	6	6	4	4	6	6	6	6
Soana	5	3	6	5	3	3	4	3	3	4	4	4	3	3	5	6	6	5	6	8	9	9	7	7	7	7	7	7	7	7
Proline	5	9	9	10	13	11	11	11	11	10	12	12	13	12	12	9	10	10	10	6	6	7	8	8	8	8	8	8	8	8
Bright Stars	3	3	5	7	5	6	7	8	5	6	6	7	7	9	7	7	7	6	7	7	8	8	9	9	9	9	9	12	12	9
Jinja	5	10	10	13	12	14	13	14	13	13	14	15	15	15	15	15	15	15	14	14	15	15	15	13	15	12	13	11	10	10
BUL	5	7	12	14	10	12	12	13	14	14	15	13	14	14	14	14	14	14	15	15	14	12	12	14	11	10	12	10	11	11
The Saints	5	12	7	12	13	10	6	7	9	11	9	10	10	11	11	11	12	11	11	11	12	13	13	10	12	13	10	9	9	12
Police	5	15	15	9	11	13	15	15	15	15	13	14	12	13	13	13	9	9	9	10	10	11	10	12	10	11	11	13	13	13
Lweza	15	16	11	11	9	9	10	10	10	9	10	11	11	8	9	10	11	12	12	12	13	14	14	15	13	15	14	14	14	14
Sadolin Paints	5	13	14	15	16	15	14	12	12	12	11	9	9	10	10	12	13	13	13	13	11	10	11	11	14	14	15	15	15	15
JMC Hippos	15	11	16	16	15	16	16	16	16	16	16	16	16	16	16	16	16	16	16	16	16	16	16	16	16	16	16	16	16	16

Updated to match(es) played on 20 May 2017. Source: Soccerway

== Season statistics ==
=== Goals ===
==== Top scorers ====
As of 17 May 2017

Rank	Player	Team	Goals
1	(Uganda) Geoffrey Sserunkuma	KCCA	20
2	(Uganda) Shaban Mohammed	Onduparaka	13
3	(Uganda) Tony Odur	Vipers	11
4	(Uganda) Emmanuel Okwi	SC Villa	10
4	(Uganda) Nelson Senkatuka	Proline	10
6	(Uganda) Shafiq Kagimu	URA	8

==== Hat-tricks ====
Player	For	Against	Result	Date
(Uganda) Allan Okello	KCCA	Onduparaka	7-0	25 February 2017
(Uganda) Emmanuel Okwi	Villa	Onduparaka	4-1	12 March 2017

=== Scoring ===
- First goal of the season: Joseph Ochaya for KCCA against JMC Hippos (19 August 2016)
