= 2019–20 Uganda Premier League =

Football season in Uganda

Uganda Premier League
- Season: 2019–20
- Champions: Vipers
- Relegated: Maroons; Proline; Tooro United
- All statistics correct as of 14 July 2019.

The 2019–20 Uganda Premier League was the 53rd season of the Uganda Premier League, the top-tier football league in Uganda.

The season was abruptly ended on 20 May 2020 due to the COVID-19 pandemic with Vipers SC declared as champions. Matches were suspended on March 18 with more than 75 percent league matches already held.

== Participating teams ==
The 2019–20 Uganda Premier League is being contested by 16 teams. Nyamityobora FC, Ndejje University, and Paidha Black Angels were relegated to the FUFA Big League from the 2018–19 Uganda Premier League season. They were replaced by Proline, winners of the Rwenzori group, Wakiso Giants, winners of the Elgon group, and playoff winners Kyetume.

Kirinya-Jinja SS were renamed as Busoga United FC.

Locations of the Uganda Premier League clubs

Club	Settlement	Stadium	Capacity
Bright Stars	Kampala	Mwererwe Stadium / Muteesa II Stadium	5,000 / 20,200
BUL Jinja FC	Jinja	Kakindu Municipal Stadium / Bugembe Stadium	1,000
Express	Kampala	Muteesa II Stadium	20,200
KCCA FC	Kampala	Star Times Stadium, Lugogo [5]	3,000
Busoga United FC	Jinja	Kakindu Municipal Stadium	1,000
Kyetume FC	Mukono	Nakisunga Saaza Ground	1,000
Maroons FC	Kampala	Luzira Prisons Stadium	1,000
Mbarara City FC	Mbarara	Kakyeka Stadium	2,000
Onduparaka FC	Onduparaka, Arua	Greenlight Stadium	
Police FC	Kampala	Star Times Stadium, Lugogo [6]	3,000
Proline FC	Kampala	Star Times Stadium, Lugogo	3,000
SC Villa	Kampala	Nakivubo Stadium	15,000
Tooro	Fort Portal	Buhinga Stadium	1,000
Uganda Revenue Authority SC	Kampala	Lugazi Stadium	2,000
Vipers SC	Kitende, Kampala	St. Mary's Stadium-Kitende	2,000
Wakiso Giants FC	Wakiso	Wakisha Stadium (under renovations)	2,000

Some of the Kampala clubs may on occasions also play home matches at the Mandela National Stadium.

== League table ==
Pos	Team	Pld	W	D	L	GF	GA	GD	Pts	Qualification or relegation
1	Vipers SC	24	16	5	3	38	15	+23	53	2020–21 CAF Champions League
2	KCCA FC	24	15	4	5	42	21	+21	49	2020–21 CAF Confederation Cup
3	SC Villa	24	12	7	5	32	21	+11	43	
4	URA FC	24	10	10	4	28	20	+8	40	
5	Busoga United FC	24	12	3	9	29	22	+7	39	
6	BUL FC	24	9	6	9	27	25	+2	33	
7	Mbarara City	24	9	6	9	26	26	0	33	
8	Onduparaka FC	24	9	4	11	30	24	+6	31	
9	Kyetume FC	24	9	3	12	24	36	−12	30	
10	Bright Stars FC	24	7	8	9	23	25	−2	29	
11	Wakiso Giants FC	24	8	5	11	24	27	−3	29	
12	Express FC	24	8	4	12	29	37	−8	28	
13	Maroons FC	24	6	6	12	26	40	−14	24	
14	Police FC	24	7	4	13	28	36	−8	22 (Note: Police 3 points deducted)	Relegation to 2020–21 FUFA Big League
15	Tooro United FC	24	6	4	14	18	38	−20	22	Relegation to 2020–21 FUFA Big League
16	Proline FC	24	8	3	13	18	38	−20	21 (Note: Proline 6 points deducted)	Relegation to 2020–21 FUFA Big League

Updated to match(es) played on 28 February 2020. Source: rsssf.com Soccerway
Rules for classification: 1) points; 2) goal difference; 3) goals scored; 4) head-to-head points; 5) head-to-head goal difference; 6) head-to-head goals scored; 7) playoff
