= 2014–15 Uganda Super League =

Football season in Uganda

Uganda Super League
- Season: 2014–15
- Champions: Vipers S.C.
- Promoted: Lweza FC (1st Rwenzori Group); Sadolin Paints FC (1st Elgon Group); Rwenshama FC (Winner Promotion Playoff)
- Relegated: Kiira Young FC (14th); Rwenshama FC (15th); Entebbe FC (16th)

The 2014–15 Ugandan Super League is the 48th season of the official Ugandan football championship, the top-level football league of Uganda. Vipers SC won the title, their first since 2004.

Vipers SC held off second placed SC Villa for the title. SC Villa had three matches overturned to 3–0 victories in their favour during the season, with Express SC and Entebbe SC both being judged to have fielded ineligible players in their matches against SC Villa. Vipers would also hold of SC Villa on penalties in the 2015 Super Cup in August.

== Overview ==
The 2014-15 FUFA Super League was contested by 16 teams, including Lweza FC, Sadolin Paints FC and Rwenshama FC who were promoted from the Ugandan Big League at the end of the 2013-14 season.

=== Participants and locations ===
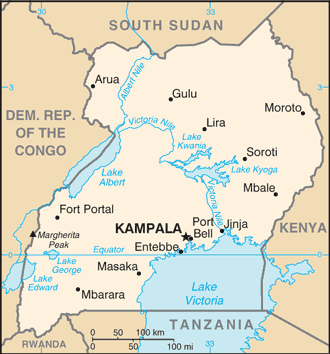
Uganda.

Club	Settlement	Stadium	Capacity
Bul FC	Jinja	Kakindu Municipal Stadium	1,000
Bright Stars FC	Kampala	Nakivubo Stadium	15,000
Entebbe FC	Entebbe	Muteesa II Stadium	20,200
Express FC	Kampala	Muteesa II Stadium	20,200
Kampala Capital City Authority FC	Kampala	Lugogo Stadium	3,000
Kiira Young	Kampala	Luzira Prisons Stadium	1,000
Lweza FC	Kampala	Mutessa 2 Royal Stadium Wankuluku	40,000
Police FC	Jinja	Kavumba Recreation Centre	1,000
KJT-Rwenshama FC	Kampala	Nakivubo Stadium	15,000
Sadolin Paints FC	Bugembe	Kyabazinga Stadium	3,000
Simba FC	Bombo	Bombo Stadium	1,000
Uganda Revenue Authority SC	Kampala	Lugazi Stadium	2,000
SC Victoria University	Kampala	Mandela National Stadium	45,200
SC Villa	Kampala	Nakivubo Stadium	15,000
Soana FC	Kampala	Kavumba Recreation Centre	1,000
Vipers SC	Buikwe	Buikwe Stadium	2,000

Some of the Kampala clubs may on occasions also play home matches at the Mandela National Stadium.

=== League standings ===
Pos	Team	Pld	W	D	L	GF	GA	GD	Pts	Qualification or relegation
1	Vipers S.C. (C)	30	20	9	1	42	18	+24	69	Champions
2	SC Villa	30	19	8	3	50	18	+32	65	
3	KCCA FC	30	16	6	8	42	21	+21	54	
4	Uganda Revenue Authority SC	30	15	11	4	48	30	+18	53 (Note: 3 points deducted.)	
5	Bul FC	30	11	10	9	27	26	+1	43	
6	Uganda Police	30	11	7	12	35	29	+6	40	
7	Bright Stars FC	30	9	11	10	24	25	−1	38	
8	Express FC	30	11	5	14	28	31	−3	38	
9	SC Victoria University	30	9	11	10	20	25	−5	38	
10	Lweza FC	30	10	7	13	28	32	−4	37	
11	Simba FC	30	10	7	13	22	27	−5	37	
12	Sadolin Paints FC	30	9	10	11	23	32	−9	37	
13	Soana FC	30	9	7	14	32	41	−9	34	
14	Kiira Young FC (R)	30	9	7	14	33	39	−6	31	Relegated
15	Rwenshama FC (R)	30	6	4	20	28	54	−26	22	Relegated
16	Entebbe FC (R)	30	3	6	21	11	51	−40	15	Relegated

(C) Champions; (R) Relegated
