= 2018–19 Uganda Premier League =

Football season in Uganda

Uganda Premier League
- Season: 2018–19
- Champions: KCCA FC
- Relegated: Ndejje University FC; Nyamityobora; Paidha Black Angels
- Matches: 240
- Goals: 525 (2.19 per match)

The 2018–19 Uganda Premier League was the 52nd season of the Uganda Premier League, the top-tier football league in Uganda. The season started on 28 September 2018.

KCCA FC won the championship with two games left to play in the home and away season, after drawing 1–1 with Ndejje University.

== Participating teams ==
UPDF, Proline FC and Masavu FC Entebbe were relegated from the 2017–18 Uganda Premier League. They were replaced by Nyamityobora FC, who won the Rwenzori group of the 2017–18 FUFA Big League, Ndejje University, and Paidha Black Angels, who won the promotion playoff. All three promoted teams would be relegated this season.

Locations of the Uganda Premier League clubs

Club	Settlement	Stadium	Capacity
Bright Stars	Kampala	Mwererwe Stadium	5,000
Bul FC	Jinja	Kakindu Municipal Stadium	1,000
Express	Kampala	Muteesa II Stadium	20,200
KCCA FC	Kampala	Lugogo Stadium	3,000
Kirinya-Jinja SSS	Jinja	Kakindu Municipal Stadium	1,000
Maroons FC	Kampala	Luzira Prisons Stadium	1,000
Mbarara City FC	Mbarara	Kakyeka Stadium	2,000
Ndejje University FC	Ndejje	Ndejje Stadium	2,000?
Nyamityobora FC	Mbarara	Nyamityobora Playing Grounds	
Onduparaka FC	Onduparaka, Arua	Greenlight Stadium	N/L
Paidha Black Angels FC	Paidha, Zombo	Okoro Stadium	6,000
Police FC	Jinja	Kavumba Recreation Centre	1,000
SC Villa	Kampala	Nakivubo Stadium	15,000
Tooro United FC (renamed from Soana FC)	Kampala	Kavumba Recreation Centre	1,000
Uganda Revenue Authority SC	Kampala	Lugazi Stadium	2,000
Vipers SC	Wakiso	St. Mary's Stadium	2,000

Some of the Kampala clubs may on occasions also play home matches at the Mandela National Stadium.

== League table ==
Pos	Team	Pld	W	D	L	GF	GA	GD	Pts	Qualification or relegation (Note: Proline (from FUFA Big League) are Uganda Cup winners and qualify for Confederation Cup.)
1	KCCA (C)	30	19	9	2	61	23	+38	66	Qualification for Champions League
2	Vipers	30	16	11	3	40	20	+20	59	
3	URA	30	12	15	3	28	13	+15	51	
4	Tooro United	30	13	10	7	32	23	+9	49	
5	Mbarara City	30	12	10	8	34	24	+10	46	
6	Onduparaka	30	12	9	9	28	23	+5	45	
7	BUL	30	11	10	9	33	28	+5	43	
8	Bright Stars	30	10	11	9	38	30	+8	41	
9	Kirinya-Jinja	30	10	11	9	28	34	−6	41	
10	Express	30	10	10	10	30	30	0	40	
11	Police	30	10	7	13	41	48	−7	37	
12	SC Villa	30	7	13	10	38	36	+2	34	
13	Maroons	30	8	9	13	32	40	−8	33	
14	Ndejje University (R)	30	6	9	15	23	41	−18	27	Relegation to 2019–20 FUFA Big League
15	Nyamityobora (R)	30	4	5	21	22	57	−35	17	Relegation to 2019–20 FUFA Big League
16	Paidha Black Angels (R)	30	2	7	21	17	55	−38	13	Relegation to 2019–20 FUFA Big League

Source: UPL
Rules for classification: 1) points; 2) goal difference; 3) goals scored; 4) head-to-head points; 5) head-to-head goal difference; 6) head-to-head goals scored; 7) playoff
(C) Champions; (R) Relegated
