= List of football clubs in Uganda =

The following is a list of association football clubs based in Uganda.

== A ==
- Alpha Young FC (Kiryandongo)
- Athletic Club Kampala
- Alur United
- Al-shadad (Kampala)

== B ==
- Blacks power F.C
- Biharwe F.C. (Biharwe)
- Bitumastic FC (Kampala)
- Boroboro FC (Lira)
- Bright Stars FC (Kampala)
- Bul FC (Jinja)
- Bunamwaya SC (Wakiso)
- Bweyale Town Council (Kiryandongo)
- Budondo FC (Jinja)
- Battle Storm FC(Bugiri)
- Butambala Hills FC (Butambala)
- Buhimba United Saints FC (Hoima)
- Bulindo young FC(Wakiso)

== C ==
- Coffee United SC (Kakira)
- CRO FC (Mbale)
- DANIDA FC (JINJA Masese)slogan ″The Masese Boys″
- CLOUD 23 FC

== E ==
Eastern talents soccer academy

Edgars Football Club (Kampala)

== Y ==
- Ediofe Hills FC (Arua)
- Entebbe Young Football Club (Kampala)
- Express FC (Kampala)
- Elgon Soccer Club (Found in Busiu Town Council - Mbale district.)

== F ==
- Fire Masters FC (Kampala)
- Fire fire FC
- Fasial international fc mbale

== G ==
- Gaddafi FC (Jinja)
- God's Army FC (kawaala)
- Gulu United FC (Gulu)
- Gomba Lions

== H ==
- Hoima FC (Hoima)
- Heritage Football Club Uganda
- Homeland FC

== J ==
- Jinja Municipal Council Hippos FC (Jinja)
- Jaguar FC

== K ==
- Kayabwe town council FC (Kayabwe)
- kakajjo fc (jinja)
- Kampala Capital City Authority FC (Kampala)
- Kawempe United Football Club (Kampala)
- Kazo United (Kampala)
- Kiira Young FC (Kampala)
- Kilembe Mines FC (Kilembe)
- Kirinya-Jinja SS FC (Busoga United FC)
- Kibuye FC (Kibuye)
- Kazo City
- Kase
- Katanga FC
- Kamunana FC(Kawempe)
- Katwe United
- Kitara FC

== L ==
- Lweza FC (Kampala)
- Lungujja Galaxy sc
- Luweero FC
- Luzira United

== M ==
- Maroons FC (Kampala)
- Masaka Local Council FC (Masaka)
- Mbale Heroes Football Club (Mbale)
- Mbarara United FC (Mbarara)
- Mbarara City F.C. (Mbarara)
- Mpumudde fc (Jinja)
- Mbogo United

== N ==
- Nile Breweries FC (Jinja)
- Nabweru FC
- Nabweru United
- Nansana United
- NEC FC (Kampala)
- Nsambya United(Kampala)

== O ==
- Onduparaka FC (Arua)

== P ==
- Police FC (Kampala)
- Police FC (Wakiso)
- Proline FC (Kampala)
- Parombo United(Nebbi), accessed 6 June 1989]>/ref>*Parombo United (Nebbi)

== R ==
- Rwenshama FC (Kampala)
- Rubaga Youth FC (Jinja)

== S ==
- Sadolin Paints FC (Bugembe)
- SC Villa (Kampala)
- Simba FC (Bombo)
- Soana FC (Kampala)
- Skyran UG FC (Kassanda)
- Santander Fc( Fort portal)
- Sky sports SC (Mbale)
- Sseguku United
- Super heroes Fc
- Sparten FC

== T ==
- The Saints FC (Kampala)

== U ==
- Uganda Revenue Authority SC (Kampala)
- Umeme FC (Jinja)
- UTODA FC (Kampala)

== V ==
- Victoria University SC (Kampala)
- Victors FC (Kampala)
- Vipers SC (Wakiso Town)
- Walukuba West FC (Jinja)

== W ==
Wakiso Giants

== Y ==
- Youth Path Academy
