= 2013–14 Uganda Super League =

Football season in Uganda

Uganda Super League
- Season: 2013–14
- Champions: Kampala Capital City Authority FC
- Relegated: Masaka Local Council FC (14th); Proline FC (15th); CRO FC (16th)
- Top goalscorer: Francis Olaki, Soana FC (15)

The 2013–14 Ugandan Super League is the 47th season of the official Ugandan football championship, the top-level football league of Uganda.

== Overview ==
The 2013–14 FUFA Super League was being contested by 16 teams, including Bright Stars FC, CRO FC and Soana FC who were promoted from the Ugandan Big League at the end of the 2013/13 season.

=== Participants and locations ===
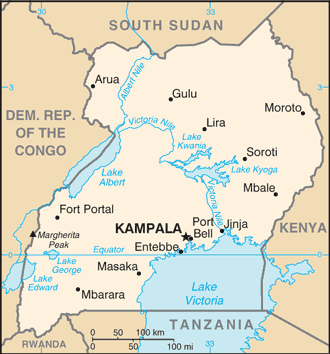
Uganda.

Club	Settlement	Stadium	Capacity
Bul FC	Jinja	Kakindu Municipal Stadium	1,000
Bright Stars FC	Kampala	Nakivubo Stadium	15,000
CRO FC	Mbale	Mbale Municipal Stadium	10,000
Entebbe FC	Entebbe	Muteesa II Stadium	20,200
Express FC	Kampala	Muteesa II Stadium	20,200
Kampala Capital City Authority FC	Kampala	Lugogo Stadium	3,000
Kiira Young	Kampala	Luzira Prisons Stadium	1,000
Masaka Local Council FC	Masaka	Masaka Recreation Ground	1,000
Police FC	Jinja	Kavumba Recreation Centre	1,000
Proline FC	Buikwe	Nakivubo Stadium	15,000
Simba FC	Bombo	Bombo Stadium	1,000
Uganda Revenue Authority SC	Kampala	Lugazi Stadium	2,000
SC Victoria University	Kampala	Mandela National Stadium	45,200
SC Villa	Kampala	Nakivubo Stadium	15,000
Soana FC	Kampala	Kavumba Recreation Centre	1,000
Vipers SC	Buikwe	Buikwe Stadium	2,000

Some of the Kampala clubs may on occasions also play home matches at the Mandela National Stadium.

=== League standings ===
Pos	Team	Pld	W	D	L	GF	GA	GD	Pts	Qualification or relegation
1	Kampala Capital City Authority FC (C)	30	18	6	6	60	24	+36	60	Champions
2	Victoria University SC	30	16	11	3	41	17	+24	59	
3	Uganda Revenue Authority SC	30	14	12	4	47	18	+29	54	
4	Vipers S.C.	30	13	12	5	35	20	+15	51	
5	Soana FC	30	13	8	9	30	31	−1	47	
6	Bul FC	30	11	12	7	28	20	+8	45	
7	SC Villa	30	11	11	8	33	34	−1	44	
8	Kiira Young	30	11	10	9	26	23	+3	43	
9	Police FC	30	9	12	9	38	31	+7	39	
10	Express FC	30	10	9	11	31	28	+3	39	
11	Simba FC	30	9	9	12	20	26	−6	36	
12	Bright Stars FC	30	5	14	11	20	35	−15	29	
13	Entebbe Young Football Club	30	4	16	10	29	43	−14	28	
14	Masaka Local Council FC (R)	30	5	12	13	26	36	−10	27	Relegated
15	Proline FC (R)	30	5	6	19	21	45	−24	21	Relegated
16	CRO FC (R)	30	3	6	21	15	69	−54	15	Relegated

(C) Champions; (R) Relegated

=== Leading goalscorer ===
The top goalscorer in the 2013–14 season was Francis Olaki of Soana FC with 15 goals.
