= 2015–16 Uganda Premier League =

Football season in Uganda

Uganda Super League
- Season: 2015–16

The 2015–16 Ugandan Super League is the 49th season of top-flight football in Uganda. Vipers are the defending champions having won their second championship last season. The campaign started on 22 August 2015.

== Teams ==
Sixteen teams played the 2015/16 season. The top side will qualify for a qualification place in the 2017 CAF Champions League and the bottom three will be relegated to the Ugandan Big League.

=== Stadia and locations ===
Club	Settlement	Stadium	Capacity
Bright Stars FC	Kampala	Nakivubo Stadium	15,000
Bul FC	Jinja	Kakindu Municipal Stadium	1,000
Express FC	Kampala	Muteesa II Stadium	20,200
Jinja Municipal Council Hippos FC	Jinja	Kakindu Municipal Stadium	1,000
Kampala Capital City Authority FC	Kampala	Lugogo Stadium	3,000
Lweza FC	Kampala	Mutessa 2 Royal Stadium Wankuluku	40,000
Maroons FC	Kampala	Luzira Maximum Prisons Stadium	1,000
Police FC	Jinja	Kavumba Recreation Centre	1,000
Sadolin Paints FC	Bugembe	Kyabazinga Stadium	3,000
Simba FC	Bombo	Bombo Stadium	1,000
Soana FC	Kampala	Kavumba Recreation Centre	1,000
The Saints FC	Kampala	Mandela National Stadium	45,200
Uganda Revenue Authority SC	Kampala	Lugazi Stadium	2,000
SC Victoria University	Kampala	Mandela National Stadium	45,200
SC Villa	Kampala	Nakivubo Stadium	15,000
Vipers SC	Buikwe	Buikwe Stadium	2,000

== League table ==
Pos	Team	Pld	W	D	L	GF	GA	GD	Pts	Qualification or relegation
1	Kampala Capital City Authority	30	16	9	5	39	21	+18	57	Qualification to the 2017 CAF Champions League
2	Vipers SC	30	14	11	5	37	22	+15	53	
3	Express FC	30	15	8	7	39	28	+11	53	
4	SC Villa	30	13	11	6	36	23	+13	50	
5	Uganda Revenue Authority SC	30	12	11	7	47	31	+16	47	
6	Bul FC	30	14	5	11	32	28	+4	47	
7	Soana FC	30	12	9	9	44	41	+3	45	
8	Police FC	30	11	11	8	31	28	+3	44	
9	Sadolin Paints FC	30	12	7	11	22	25	−3	43	
10	Jinja Municipal Council Hippos FC	30	10	8	12	26	23	+3	38	
11	The Saints FC	30	10	7	13	30	28	+2	37	
12	Bright Stars FC	30	9	10	11	20	23	−3	37	
13	Lweza FC	30	9	7	14	26	40	−14	34	
14	Simba FC (R)	30	7	11	12	27	27	0	32	Relegation to the Ugandan Big League
15	SC Victoria University (R)	30	5	4	21	17	60	−43	19	Relegation to the Ugandan Big League
16	Maroons FC (R)	30	3	7	20	15	40	−25	16	Relegation to the Ugandan Big League

Updated to match(es) played on 27 May 2016. Source: Standings
Rules for classification: 1) points; 2) goal difference; 3) number of goals scored.
(R) Relegated
