= 2020–21 Uganda Premier League =

Football season in Uganda

Uganda Premier League
- Season: 2020–21
- Champions: Express FC
- Matches: 213
- Goals: 602 (2.83 per match)

The 2020–21 Uganda Premier League was the 53rd season of the Uganda Premier League, the top-tier football league in Uganda. The season ended prematurely due to a 42-day lockdown as a result of the COVID-19 pandemic with only four rounds to play. FUFA announced Express FC the winners in July 2021 under league regulations that allow a winner to be declared if the league is more than 75% complete. Because the cup was cancelled during the semi-final stage, runners-up URA were selected to represent Uganda in the Confederation Cup.

MYDA and Kitara were already statistically relegated by the time the league was suspended, while Kyetume FC were relegated when the league ended early.

== League Table ==
Pos	Team	Pld	W	D	L	GF	GA	GD	Pts	Qualification or relegation
1	Express (C)	26	17	7	2	44	13	+31	58	Champions, Qualification to the 2021–22 CAF Champions League
2	Uganda Revenue Authority	26	17	6	3	41	18	+23	57	Qualification to the 2021–22 CAF Confederation Cup
3	Vipers	26	17	5	4	56	21	+35	56	
4	Kampala Capital City Authority	27	14	6	7	56	22	+34	48	
5	Bright Stars	27	11	9	7	40	27	+13	42	
6	Police	27	11	7	9	50	31	+19	40	
7	Mbarara City	27	10	8	9	30	34	−4	38	
8	UPDF	27	11	4	12	34	39	−5	37	
9	Wakiso Giants	26	8	12	6	42	33	+9	36	
10	SC Villa	27	9	9	9	29	30	−1	36	
11	BUL	27	9	6	12	39	41	−2	33	
12	Onduparaka	26	8	4	14	25	45	−20	28	
13	Busoga United	26	6	8	12	21	44	−23	26	
14	Kyetume (R)	27	5	8	14	28	47	−19	23	Relegation to the 2021–22 FUFA Big League
15	MYDA (R)	27	3	5	19	32	77	−45	14	Relegation to the 2021–22 FUFA Big League
16	Kitara (R)	27	3	4	20	35	80	−45	13	Relegation to the 2021–22 FUFA Big League

Source: soccerway.com
Rules for classification: 1) points; 2) goal difference; 3) number of goals scored.
(C) Champions; (R) Relegated
