= 2017–18 Uganda Premier League =

Football season in Uganda

Ugandan Premier League
- Season: 2017–18
- Champions: Vipers SC

The 2017–18 Ugandan Premier League is the 51st season of top-flight football in Uganda. The season began on 12 September 2017 and ended on 25 May 2018.

== League table ==
Pos	Team	Pld	W	D	L	GF	GA	GD	Pts	Qualification or relegation
1	Vipers (C)	30	19	8	3	50	20	+30	65	2018–19 CAF Champions League
2	KCCA	30	17	10	3	54	21	+33	61	2018–19 CAF Confederation Cup
3	SC Villa (Note: two goals and two points deducted)	30	16	9	5	28	12	+16	55	
4	Onduparaka	30	13	9	8	28	17	+11	48	
5	Kirinya-Jinja (Note: one goal and one point deducted)	30	12	8	10	30	27	+3	43	
6	Bul	30	11	6	13	26	29	−3	39	
7	Police	30	11	6	13	31	39	−8	39	
8	Bright Stars	30	8	14	8	24	26	−2	38	
9	URA	30	9	10	11	26	28	−2	37	
10	Maroons	30	6	19	5	18	20	−2	37	
11	Mbarara City	30	6	14	10	17	25	−8	32	
12	Soana	30	8	8	14	19	35	−16	32	
13	Express	30	8	7	15	25	31	−6	31	
14	UPDF (R)	30	7	8	15	22	41	−19	29	Relegation to 2017-18 Big League
15	Proline (R)	30	7	7	16	27	34	−7	28	Relegation to 2017-18 Big League
16	Masavu (R)	30	5	11	14	18	41	−23	26	Relegation to 2017-18 Big League

Rules for classification: 1) points; 2) goal difference; 3) goals scored; 4) head-to-head points; 5) head-to-head goal difference; 6) head-to-head goals scored; 7) playoff
(C) Champions; (R) Relegated

Note: The Saints FC were renamed UPDF FC (UPDF = Uganda Peoples' Defence Forces)
