= Ndejje University FC =

Ugandan football club

Ndejje University Football Club
- Full name: Ndejje University Football Club
- Nicknames: NDU Lions, The Learners
- Dissolved: 2024
- Stadium: Arena of Visions, Ndejje University
- Owner: Ndejje University
- League: FUFA Big League
- BetPawa 2023–24: BetPawa Big League, 14th, Disbanded
- Website: www.ndejjeuniversityfc.com
colours

Ndejje University Football Club, also NDU Lions, were a Ugandan University football club from Ndejje, in Luwero District. They have mostly played in the second division of Ugandan football but appeared in the top flight for the 2018–19 season.

The club was affiliated with Ndejje University, the second Ugandan team in the Uganda Premier League to be affiliated with an educational institution after Kirinya–Jinja Senior Secondary School FC now Busoga United, which is affiliated with Jinja Senior Secondary School.

== History ==
Ndejje were one of the founding clubs of the FUFA Big League in 2009.

Ndejje were promoted to the Uganda Premier League after winning the Elgon group and their promotion from the FUFA Big League in the 2017/2018 football season.

The NDU Lions were relegated after one season in the top flight after losing 1–0 to Onduparaka FC on the second to last matchday of the 2019 season.

However at the half season of BetPawa FUFA Big League, Ndejje University administration decided to disband the club citing a number of reasons including low revenue generation and poor performances. All the players that were registered in the club's system were then relieved by FUFA and considered free agents.

== Statistics ==
=== Ndejje University FC Results ===
Date	Opponent	Score	WDL
Saturday, 4 May 2023	Busoga United FC	0–0	D
Thursday 2 May 2023	Onduparaka FC	0–1	L
Tuesday 23 April 2023	KCCA FC	1–1	D
Tuesday 16 April 2023	SC Villa	0–0	D
Tuesday 9 April 2023	Nyamityobora FC	3–1	W
Friday 5 April 2023	Bul FC	1–1	D
Wednesday 13 April 2023	Mbarara City FC	0–0	D
Tuesday 5 March 2023	Vipers FC	2–1	W
Saturday 2 March 2023	Bright Stars FC	0–3	L
Tuesday 26 February 2023	Express FC	0–1	L

== Non playing squad ==
The late Raymond Timothy Komakech was the team's longest serving coach who unfortunately succumbed to kidney failure. He also managed four games for Ndejje University FC. Asuman Lubowa, the Team's Technical Director was then expected to assume the coaching role on interim basis.

== Honours ==
- FUFA Big League Champions, 2017–18
- FUFA Big League Fairplay Team, 2022–24

== See also ==
- Express FC
- Kampala Capital City Authority FC
- SC Villa
- Bright Stars FC
- Vipers SC
- BUL Jinja FC
- Busoga United FC
- Muteesa II Wankulukuku Stadium
- Ugandan Premier League
