= 2012–13 Uganda Big League =

Uganda Big League
- Season: 2012–13
- Champions: CRO FC (Elgon Group); Bright Stars FC (Rwenzori Group)

The 2012–13 Ugandan Big League was the 4th season of the official second tier Ugandan football championship.

== Overview ==
The 2012–13 Uganda Big League was contested by 19 teams divided into two groups. The Elgon Group was won by CRO FC and the Rwenzori Group was won by Bright Stars FC. The third promotion place went to Soana FC who won the promotion play-off.

Clubs within the Big League enter the Ugandan Cup and Bright Stars FC progressed as far as the Quarter Finals where they were defeated 2-0 away to SC Victoria University, the eventual winners of the competition.

== League standings ==
=== Elgon Group ===
Pos	Team	Pld	W	D	L	GF	GA	GD	Pts	Promotion or relegation
1	CRO FC (C, P)	16	9	2	5	30	15	+15	29	Promotion to 2013–14 Uganda Super League
2	Soroti Garage FC	16	8	5	3	16	11	+5	29	Qualification to Promotion playoffs
3	Mbale Heroes FC	16	7	6	3	19	11	+8	27	Qualification to Promotion playoffs
4	Jinja MC FC	15	6	4	5	15	12	+3	22 (Note: FCC ruled in favour of Jinja MC when Kasese Youth did not turn up for their fixture - points and goals adjustments unknown.)	
5	Bugembe United FC	16	3	7	6	11	13	−2	16	
6	Hoima Busia FC	16	6	3	7	6	19	−13	15 (Note: Hoima Busia FC were docked 6 points and 6 goals for not honouring fixtures with Rwenshama FC and Kasese Youth FC.)	
7	Rwenshama FC	15	6	3	6	11	22	−11	15 (Note: Rwenshama FC were docked 6 points and 6 goals for not honouring fixtures with Mbale Heroes FC and Bugembe United FC.)	
8	Ngora Freda Carr FC	16	3	5	8	15	21	−6	14	
9	Kasese Youth FC (R)	15	4	2	9	13	28	−15	8 (Note: Kasese Youth FC were docked 6 points and 6 goals for not honouring fixtures with Ngora Freda Carr FC and Soroti Garage FC.)	Relegated to Regional Leagues
10	Old Timers FC	0	–	–	–	–	–	—	0	Withdrew

(C) Champions; (P) Promoted; (R) Relegated

=== Rwenzori Group ===
Pos	Team	Pld	W	D	L	GF	GA	GD	Pts	Promotion or relegation
1	Bright Stars FC (C, P)	18	11	5	2	23	6	+17	38	Promotion to 2013–14 Uganda Super League
2	Soana FC (P)	18	10	7	1	31	9	+22	37	Qualification to Promotion playoffs
3	Koboko FC	18	10	2	6	31	19	+12	32	Qualification to Promotion playoffs
4	Wandegeya FC	18	8	5	5	29	18	+11	29	
5	Ndejje University FC	18	7	6	5	25	11	+14	27	
6	Nkumba University FC	18	6	2	10	23	30	−7	20	
7	Baza Holdings FC	18	3	6	9	14	20	−6	15	
8	Mvara Boys FC	17	3	4	10	10	31	−21	13	
9	Iganga MC FC (R)	17	4	4	9	9	33	−24	13 (Note: Iganga MC FC were docked 3 points and 3 goals for not honouring their fixture with Bright Stars FC.) (Note: Iganga MC FC did not travel to Mvara Boys FC - points and goals adjustments unknown.)	Relegated to Regional Leagues
10	UTODA FC (R)	18	3	7	8	1	32	−31	7 (Note: UTODA FC were docked 9 points and 9 goals for not honouring fixtures with Baza Holdings FC and Bright Stars FC.)	Relegated to Regional Leagues

(C) Champions; (P) Promoted; (R) Relegated

== Promotion playoff ==
=== Semi-finals ===
Thursday, 25 April 2013
4:00 pm

Soroti Garage FC	Match abandoned Awarded to Koboko	Koboko FC
	Report

Kakindu Stadium

Thursday, 25 April 2013
4:00 pm

Soana FC	3-0	Mbale Heroes FC
	Report

Njeru Technical Centre

=== Final ===
Saturday, 27 April 2013
1:30 pm

Koboko FC	0-3	Soana FC
	Report	Siraje Tirwamureba; Dan Wagaluka; Mark Kagimu

Mehta Stadium, Lugazi

== Championship playoff ==
=== Final ===
Saturday, 4 May 2013
4.00 pm

Bright Stars FC	2-1	CRO FC

Mehta Stadium, Lugazi
