= 2011–12 Uganda Big League =

Uganda Big League
- Season: 2011–12
- Champions: Entebbe FC

The 2011–12 Ugandan Big League is the 3rd season of the official second tier Ugandan football championship.

== Overview ==
The 2011–12 Uganda Big League was contested by 19 teams divided into two groups. The Elgon Group was won by Entebbe FC and the Rwenzori Group was won by Kiira Young FC. The third promotion place went to Victoria University FC who won the promotion play-off with Aurum Roses FC. Entebbe FC finished as overall champions after defeating Kiira Young FC 1-0 in the championship final

Clubs within the Big League enter the Ugandan Cup and a number of clubs reached the last 16.

== League standings ==
The final league tables are not available for the 2011-12 season. Details of the teams that formed the constitution of the Elgon and Rwenzori Groups are provided below:

=== Elgon Group ===
- CRO FC
- Entebbe Young FC
- Iganga Municipal Council FC
- Jinja Municipal Council FC
- Kirinya United FC
- Mbale Heroes FC
- Mbarara Old Timers FC
- Sharing Youth FC
- Soroti Garage FC
- Wandegeya FC

=== Rwenzori Group ===
- Aurum Roses FC
- Boroboro Tigers FC
- Jogoo Young FC
- Kiira Young
- Koboko Sports Club FC
- Kwania Sports Club FC
- Misindye Soana FC
- Ndejje University FC
- SC Victoria University
- Gulu United FC withdrew

== Promotion playoff ==
=== Semi-finals ===
Thursday 10 May 2012

Aurum Roses FC	WO	Mbarara Old Timers FC
	Report

Masaka Recreation Ground

Mbarara Old Timers failed to honour the semi-final encounter.

Thursday 10 May 2012

SC Victoria University	1-1	CRO FC
Dennis Guma	Report	Musa Malunda

Njeru Technical Centre

Victoria University won 8-7 on post-match penalties.

=== Final ===
Saturday 19 May 2012
1:30 pm

Aurum Roses FC	0-4	SC Victoria University
	Report	Moses Gaale (2); Edrine Kagende; Ronald Kirumira

Namboole Stadium

== Championship playoff ==
=== Final ===
Saturday 19 May 2012
4.30 pm

Entebbe Young FC	1-0	Kiira Young
Henry Nyanzi [pen]	Report

Namboole Stadium
