= Wakiso Giants FC =

Association football club in Uganda

- Wakiso Giants FC Logo
- Full name: Wakiso Giants Football Club
- Nickname: Purple Sharks
- Short name: wgfc
- Founded: 2009
- Ground: Wakisha Stadium, Wakiso
- Capacity: 3,200
- Chairman: Lule Hassan
- Coach: Steven Bengo
- League: Uganda Super League
- 2023–24: 12th
- Website: www.wakisogiantsfc.com

Wakiso Giants FC is a football team from Wakiso, Uganda currently playing in the FUFA Big league.The team is currently owned by proprietor Musa Atagenda, also known as Musa Ssebulime. Wakiso Giants FC was playing in the Uganda Premier League last season and it was relegated back to FUFA Big League after its humiliating 5-0 defeat at the hands of KCCA FC. The Club is also The Purple Sharks.

== History ==
The club was established in 2009 as Artland Katale by city lawyer Muhammad Bazirengedde. During that campaign in the first division as well as the second division, the club hosted their games at Katale, moved to Taibah, and later Mashariki. But the club shifted their home ground to Buziga Islamic pitch, along Ggaba Road after qualifying for the FUFA Big League.

However, after three seasons of very little success, the club owner then opted to sell it off.

=== Post Artland Katale Era ===
From Artland, the team was bought off by then, Kamuli Park, then a Regional side in eastern Uganda. Under Abedi Muwanika, the chairman of the club then, it rose to the second highest division in Ugandan football, the FUFA Big League.

In its first season as a merger, it was referred to as Artland Kamuli Park as per the regulations of the Ugandan FA in 2016/17 but gained full independence in the following season changing name to Kamuli Park. The 2017/18 season proved better as the team put up spirited performances but missed out on promotion to the Azam Uganda Premier League – finishing fourth in Rwenzori Group, a slot behind Promotional Play Offs.

=== New Era ===
In June 2018, a group of businessmen bought the club and renamed it Wakiso Giants Football Club. The renaming of the club was crystal clear since it shifted home from Kamuli (eastern Uganda) to Wakiso (central Uganda) and the owners hail from the area. It immediately went on a signing spree acquiring some of the best talent on the land and also embarked on rebranding.

== Stadium ==
Giants play their home matches at Kabaka Kyabaggu stadium, also known as Wakissha Resource Centre in Wakiso. However, due to stadium-quality and a disagreement with the Ugandan football licensing authorities, the Purple Sharks played their home games for the 2018–19 season in the FUFA Big League at Kyabazinga Stadium, Bugembe.

== Statistics and records ==
WAKISO GIANTS FC RESULTS
17.11.23 16:00	Wakiso Giants FC	0:0	Express Football Club	D
31.10.23 19:00	Vipers SC	3:0	Wakiso Giants FC	L
25.10.23 16:00	Wakiso Giants FC	1:3	Airtel Kitara	L
21.10.23 16:00	Uganda Revenue Authority	1:0	Wakiso Giants FC	L
29.09.23 16:00	UPDF FC	0:2	Wakiso Giants FC	W
23.09.23 16:00	Wakiso Giants FC	1:1	Bright Stars FC	D
17.09.23 15:00	Wakiso Giants FC	0:3	Maroons FC	L
27.05.23 15:00	Arua Hill	1:0	Wakiso Giants FC	L
16.05.23 16:00	Wakiso Giants FC	2:0	Bright Stars FC	W
12.05.23 16:00	Busoga United FC	0:0	Wakiso Giants FC	D
01.05.23 16:00	Wakiso Giants FC	0:0	Bul FC	D
28.04.23 16:00	Express Football Club	1:1	Wakiso Giants FC	D
23.04.23 14:00	Wakiso Giants FC	3:0	Onduparaka FC	W
18.04.23 14:00	Gaddafi	0:0	Wakiso Giants FC	D
08.04.23 16:00	Wakiso Giants FC	1:3	SC Villa JOGOO	L
05.04.23 16:00	Uganda Revenue Authority	2:1	Wakiso Giants FC	L
31.03.23 16:00	Wakiso Giants FC	0:1	UPDF FC	L
22.03.23 16:00	Blacks Power	1:0	Wakiso Giants FC	L
03.03.23 16:00	Wakiso Giants FC	1:2	Maroons FC	L
21.02.23 16:00	Vipers SC	0:0	Wakiso Giants FC	D

== Current squad ==
This was the squad of 2023. Note: Flags indicate national team as defined under FIFA eligibility rules; some limited exceptions apply. Players may hold more than one non-FIFA nationality.

No.	Pos.	Nation	Player
30	GK	UGA	Lukuya Kenneth
14	GK	UGA	Ssekagya Bashir
6	DF	UGA	Arinda Ambrose
2	DF	UGA	Bashir Asiku
21	DF	UGA	Kaddu George
23	DF	UGA	Onega Collines
15	DF	UGA	Willa Paul
28	MF	UGA	Blanchar Mulamba
4	MF	UGA	Bukenya Lawrence
5	MF	UGA	Kagogwe Apollo
20	MF	UGA	Kigozi Andrew Samson
9	MF	UGA	Kimera Kenneth
16	MF	UGA	Lukooya Baker
7	MF	UGA	Masiko Tom
26	MF	UGA	Mukiibi Marvin
17	MF	UGA	Nyanzi Marvin
18	MF	UGA	Ssenfuka Rahmat
11	MF	UGA	Ssenyonga Mikidadi
12	MF	UGA	Ssenyonjo Hassan
27	MF	UGA	Tito
29	MF	UGA	Wamusi Jerome
19	FW	UGA	Nsubuga Mark
10	FW	UGA	Ssenoga Muhammad Kagawa

== See also ==
- Express FC
- Kampala Capital City Authority FC
- SC Villa
- Uganda Revenue Authority SC
- Vipers SC
- BUL Jinja FC
- Busoga United FC
- Muteesa II Wankulukuku Stadium
- Ugandan Premier League
- Police FC
