= 2010–11 Uganda Big League =

Uganda Big League
- Season: 2010–11
- Champions: Maji FC

The 2010–11 Ugandan Big League is the 2nd season of the official second tier Ugandan football championship.

== Overview ==
The 2010–11 Uganda Big League was contested by 18 teams divided into two groups. The Elgon Group was won by Hoima-Busia FC and the Rwenzori Group was won by Maji FC. The third promotion place went to BUL Bidco FC who won the promotion play-off.

Clubs within the Big League enter the Ugandan Cup and Misindye FC and Jinja Arsenal FC progressed as far as the Quarter Finals.

== League standings ==
The final league tables are not available for the 2010-11 season. Details of the teams that formed the constitution of the Elgon and Rwenzori Groups are provided below:

=== Elgon Group ===
- Bul FC
- Entebbe Young FC
- Iganga Municipal Council FC
- Hoima-Busia FC
- Jinja Arsenal FC
- Jinja MC Hippos FC
- KASE FC
- Mbale Heroes FC
- Misindye FC

=== Rwenzori Group ===
- Arua Central FC
- Bishop Nankyama FC
- Boroboro Tigers FC
- CRO FC
- Hoima Central Market FC
- Jogoo Young FC
- Maji FC (also known as Water FC)
- Ndejje University FC
- Sharing Youth FC

== Promotion playoff ==
=== Semi-finals ===
First leg

29 May 2011

| Iganga Municipal Council FC | 5-0 | Boroboro Tigers FC |
|---|---|---|
| | Report |

Saza Ground, Iganga

29 May 2011

| CRO FC | 2-0 | Bul FC |
|---|---|---|
| | Report |

Mbale Municipal Stadium

Second leg

7 June 2011

| Boroboro Tigers FC | 5-0 Abandoned (55min) | Iganga Municipal Council FC |
|---|---|---|
| | Report |

Lira

Score 5–5 on aggregate. Iganga progressed to Final as Boroboro refused to participate in replay.

7 June 2011

| Bul FC | 2-0 | CRO FC |
|---|---|---|
| | Report |

Score 2–2 on aggregate. BUL Bidco FC won 3-0 on penalties.

=== Final ===
10 July 2011

| Iganga Municipal Council FC | 0-1 [aet] | Bul FC |
|---|---|---|
| | | Ali Maganda |

== Championship playoff ==
=== Final ===
10 June 2011

| Maji FC | 5-2 | Hoima-Busia FC |
|---|---|---|
| Julius Engude (3); Patrick Ssenfuka [pen] Innocent Alimadri | Report | Isa Baraza; Patrick Wafula [pen] |

Njeru Stadium
