= Ibrahim Mugulusi =

Ugandan footballer

Personal information
- Full name: Ibrahim Mugulusi
- Date of birth: November 22, 1997 (age 28)
- Place of birth: Uganda
- Position: Midfielder

Team information
- Current team: BUL FC

Senior career*
Years	Team	Apps	(Gls)
2017–2020	Busoga United		
2020	Kampala University / SC Villa		
2020–	BUL FC		
- * Club domestic league appearances and goals as of date=July 2025

Ibrahim Mugulusi (born November 22, 1997) is a Ugandan footballer who plays as a Midfielder for BUL FC.

== Club career ==
Ibrahim began his football career at Busoga United from 2017 to 2020 before joining Kampala University and SC Villa. He then signed with BUL FC in August 2020 and extended his contract in June 2024 through June 2026.

== Honours ==
He was part of the BUL FC squad that reached the Uganda Cup final in 2021, finishing as runners-up to Vipers SC. In 2022/23 season of CAF Confederation Cup, he participated and competed in the continental football with BUL FC after the Uganda Cup win.
