= 2021–22 FUFA Big League =

FUFA Big League
- Season: 2021–22
- Champions: Blacks Power
- Promoted: Blacks Power; Maroons
- Matches played: 110
- Goals scored: 310 (2.82 per match)

The 2022–23 FUFA Big League was a season of second division football in Uganda.

This season, FUFA changed the format of the Big League to 12 teams in one group because of the failure to complete the regional leagues as a result of the COVID-19 pandemic. Eight teams were promoted from regional leagues this season so the competition could return to 16 teams.

The league resumed in October 2021 without Water FC, who failed licensing requirements, and the league went ahead with 11 teams.

Lira-based Blacks Power won the Big League title after defeating Luweero United 2–1 on the last match day. Kataka led the league entering the final match day but not even secure promotion. Kyetume defeated Kataka 3–2 on the final match day to move above them in the table. With Maroons 5–0 win over relegated Nyamityobora moving Maroons into second, Kataka fell to fourth place. Proline were also relegated after having a bye in the final round, which allowed Ndejje University to move above them with a 5–0 win over Kitara.

Kyetume was later denied promotion for failing to meet licensing requirements, and was relegated to the third division.

== League Table ==
Pos	Team	Pld	W	D	L	GF	GA	GD	Pts	Qualification or relegation
1	Blacks Power (P, C)	20	11	6	3	34	17	+17	39	Promotion to the 2022–23 Uganda Premier League
2	Maroons (P)	20	11	5	4	35	18	+17	38	Promotion to the 2022–23 Uganda Premier League
3	Kyetume (R)	20	11	4	5	45	23	+22	37	Relegated after failing promotion criteria
4	Kataka	20	10	6	4	35	20	+15	36	
5	Calvary	20	8	5	7	23	19	+4	29	
6	Kitara	20	7	6	7	31	42	−11	27	
7	Ndejje University	20	7	5	8	28	24	+4	26	
8	Luweero United	20	7	4	9	21	25	−4	25	
9	Proline (R)	20	7	4	9	25	32	−7	25	Relegation
10	MYDA (R)	20	2	5	13	17	38	−21	11	Relegation
11	Nyamityobora FC (R)	20	1	6	13	16	52	−36	9	Relegation

Rules for classification: 1) points; 2) goal difference; 3) number of goals scored.
(C) Champions; (P) Promoted; (R) Relegated
