= Acholi Queens FC =

Ugandan women's association football club

- Nickname: "The Queens"
- Founded: 2015
- Stadium: Kitgum Boma Grounds
- Coordinates: 3.2941° N, 32.8779° E
- President: Michael Kilama
- Manager: Wilfred
| Home colours | Away colours |

Acholi Queens FC, also known as Vision College Football Club, is a Ugandan football club based in Kitugum, Uganda. They play in the top division of Ugandan football, the FUFA Women Elite League.

Their home stadium is located in Booma Kitgum. In 2028 Kitgum Boma Ground Development Task Force (KBGDTF) was established to oversee the upgrading of the stadium to attract national games and identify and develop the talents of young stars in sports. The club is currently held by the Club President Micheal Kalima and Club Manager Wilfred. The Club is known as the "Queens".

== History ==
Acholi Queens FC started in 2015 as Vision College Football Club. The director of Vision College Kitgum founded Acholi Queens FC, formerly known as Vision Ladies Football Club, as a school team in 2015. (Mr Kilama Micheal). The Vision Women's Football Club entered the FUFA Competition League in 2015 and initially competed in the 5th Division before moving up to the 4th Division. The team earned a spot in the third division.

In the third division, the first leg was played in the Apac District (Apac Municipal Stadium) and the second leg in the Amolator District, where the team advanced to the play-off between Vision Women's Football Club and Amugu SS, which was held in the Omoro District. The squad was paired to meet West Nile Champion Paidha Women FC on a home-and-away basis after winning the Northern Region, and Vision Women Football Club defeated Paidha Women 3–1 on aggregate following a 1–1 draw in Paidha and a 2–0 win in Kitgum. The team subsequently earned a spot in the FUFA Women's Elite League. The club participated in the Elite League for two seasons (2019–2020 and 2020–2021). FUFA Executive Member changed the name of Vision Women's Football Club to Acholi Queens FC on 13.10.2021. In recent seasons, the club has participated in both the Elite League and the FUFA Women's Cup. In early 2023, they were drawn against top-flight side Kampala Queens in the Uganda Cup Round of 32.

== Players ==
=== Current squad ===
Note: Flags indicate national team as defined under FIFA eligibility rules; some limited exceptions apply. Players may hold more than one non-FIFA nationality.

| No. | Pos. | Nation | Player |
|---|---|---|---|
| 1 | GK | UGA | Alum Kadijjah Mohammed |
| 18 | GK | UGA | Lamwaka Winfred Lomakech |
| 5 | DF | UGA | Adongocen Lillian Kaggwa |
| 4 | DF | UGA | Lakica Tracy |
| 20 | DF | UGA | Acio Recho |
| 9 | FW | UGA | Akwii Barbrah |
| 6 | MF | UGA | Atimango Winfred |
| 16 | MF | UGA | Amolo Tracy |
| 23 | FW | UGA | Lukica Merion |
| 10 | FW | UGA | Apili Elizabeth |
| 22 | MF | UGA | Amito Vivian Charity |
| 11 | FW | UGA | Atimango Salipher |
| 7 | FW | UGA | Agenorwot Jeriza |
| 15 | DF | UGA | Anena Lucky |
| 26 | MF | UGA | Atenyo Sharon |
| 27 | MF | UGA | Atimango Gloria |
| 19 | DF | UGA | Laker Feltaline |
| 21 | DF | UGA | Abio Racheal |
| 17 | MF | UGA | Adongo Peace |
| 25 | DF | UGA | Anena Scovia |
| 14 | FW | UGA | Atim Gift |
| 12 | MF | UGA | Atimango Patricia Ricky |
| 03 | DF | UGA | Ayee Solinda |
| 10 | FW | UGA | Aber Prisca Eva |
| — | MF | UGA | Akulu Sharon |

== See also ==
- Express FC
- Kampala Capital City Authority FC
- SC Villa
- Uganda Revenue Authority SC
- Vipers SC
- BUL Jinja FC
- Busoga United FC
- Muteesa II Wankulukuku Stadium
- Ugandan Premier League
