= 2013–14 Uganda Big League =

Uganda Big League
- Season: 2013–14
- Champions: Lweza FC
- Promoted: Lweza FC; Sadolin Paints FC; KJT-Rwenshama FC
- Relegated: Kumi University FC; Mbale Heroes FC; Kigezi Good Sammaritan FC; Gulu University FC; Vurra FC; Mvara Boys FC

The 2013–14 Ugandan Big League is the 5th season of the official second tier Ugandan football championship.

== Overview ==
The 2013–14 Uganda Big League is being contested by 21 teams divided into two groups, the Elgon Group and the Rwenzori Group. The following clubs have been renamed since the 2012/13 season:

- Artland Katale FC (formerly Koboko FC)
- Hope Doves FC (formerly Aurum Roses FC).
- Sadolin Paints (formerly Bugembe United FC)

Former Uganda Super League clubs Maroons FC, Victors FC and Water FC were excluded from the FUFA Big League after they failed to apply for registration.

With effect from Tuesday 29 October 2013 FUFA de-registered Kigezi Good Samaritan FC (KGS FC) from the Big League. The Kabale-based club failed to honour their first game against Kirinya FC from Jinja. Although the match was at their home ground in Kabale, Kigezi Samaritan FC did not turn up for the match.

In December 2013 Water FC (namely National Water and Sewerage Corporation (NWSC) FC) submitted a request to FUFA to take over the fixtures of Kigezi GS FC.

Clubs within the Big League enter the Ugandan Cup.

== League standings ==
2013–14 final league tables:

=== Elgon Group ===
Pos	Team	Pld	W	D	L	GF	GA	GD	Pts	Qualification or relegation
1	Sadolin Paints FC	18	14	3	1	31	5	+26	45	Qualified for the Championship playoff
2	KJT-Rwenshama FC	18	10	4	4	34	10	+24	34	Qualified for the Promotion playoff
3	Kirinya-Jinja SS FC	18	9	6	3	21	9	+12	33	Qualified for the Promotion playoff
4	Jinja Municipal Council FC	18	8	6	4	24	12	+12	30	
5	Busia United FC	18	6	5	7	20	21	−1	20 (Note: Docked points and goals for not honouring fixtures.)	
6	Ngora Freda Carr FC	18	6	4	8	12	25	−13	19	
7	Hope Doves FC	18	3	6	9	13	19	−6	15	
8	Soroti Garage FC	17	3	7	7	6	18	−12	13	
9	Kumi University FC	17	2	5	10	8	32	−24	11	Relegated
10	Mbale Heroes FC	18	2	6	10	9	27	−18	9	Relegated
11	Kigezi Good Sammaritan FC	0	–	–	–	–	–	—	0	Withdrew

=== Rwenzori Group ===
Pos	Team	Pld	W	D	L	GF	GA	GD	Pts	Qualification or relegation
1	Lweza FC	19	12	5	2	48	18	+30	41	Qualified for the Championship playoff
2	Baza Holdings FC	19	12	3	4	34	16	+18	39	Qualified for the Promotion playoff
3	Mutundwe Lions FC	18	9	6	3	27	11	+16	33	Qualified for the Promotion playoff
4	The Saints FC	18	8	6	4	27	18	+9	30	
5	Ndejje University FC	18	7	5	6	21	16	+5	26	
6	Wandegeya FC	19	6	3	10	22	24	−2	21	
7	Artland Katale FC	19	5	5	9	23	37	−14	20	
8	Victoria Club California FC	19	4	7	8	18	32	−14	19	
9	Gulu University FC	19	4	4	11	20	36	−16	16	Relegated
10	Vurra FC	18	5	1	12	20	45	−25	13 (Note: Docked points and goals for not honouring fixtures.)	Relegated
11	Mvara Boys FC	10	2	3	5	9	16	−7	3	Relegated

== Promotion playoff ==
=== Semi-finals ===
21 May 2014

KJT-Rwenshama FC	2-0	Mutundwe Lions FC

Lugogo Stadium

21 May 2014

Kirinya-Jinja SS FC	2-0	Baza Holdings FC

Lugogo Stadium

=== Final ===
24 May 2014

KJT-Rwenshama FC	3-2	Kirinya-Jinja SS FC

Lugogo Stadium

== Championship playoff ==
=== Final ===
24 May 2014

Lweza FC	2-0	Sadolin Paints FC

Lugogo Stadium
