= 2009–10 Uganda Big League =

Uganda Big League
- Season: 2009–10

The 2009–10 Ugandan Big League is the 1st season of the official second tier Ugandan football championship.

== Overview ==
The 2009–10 Uganda Big League was contested by 16 teams divided into two groups. The Elgon Group was won by Gulu United FC and the Rwenzori Group was won by Maroons FC. The third promotion place went to UTODA FC who won the promotion play-off.

Clubs within the Big League enter the Ugandan Cup and Gulu United FC progressed as far as the Quarter Finals where they were defeated 3-0 away to Masaka LC .

== Participants and locations ==
The 16 clubs that competed in the first season of the FBL in 2009-10 were as follows:

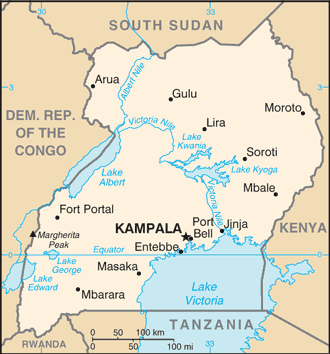
Uganda.

Participating clubs	Settlement	Position in the 2008/09 season
Bishop Nankyama FC	Bukalasa	Semi-finalists from Buganda Regional League
Devine Waters FC	Apac	Third placed team from North Regional Super Mini League
Fort Hills FC	Fort Portal	Third placed team from West Regional Super Mini League
Gulu United FC	Gulu	
Jinja Arsenal FC	Jinja	
Jinja Municipal Council Hippos FC	Jinja	Runner-up from East Regional Super Mini League
KASE FC	Kampala	Third placed team from Kampala Regional Super Mini League
Maroons FC	Kampala	Runners-up from Kampala Regional Super Mini League
Masaka Municipal Council FC	Masaka	
Mbale Heroes FC	Mbale	Third placed team from East Regional Super Mini League
Mbarara United FC	Mbarara	Fourteenth team in Uganda Super League
Misindye FC	Mukono	Third placed team from Buganda Regional Super Mini League
Ndejje University FC	Luwero	Runners-up from Buganda Regional Super Mini League
Samba Boys FC	Yumbe	Runners-up from North Regional Super Mini League
Sharing Youth FC	Kampala	Seventeenth team in Uganda Super League
UTODA FC	Kampala	Semi-finalists from Kampala Regional League

== League standings ==
=== Elgon Group ===
Pos	Team	Pld	W	D	L	GF	GA	GD	Pts	Promotion or qualification
1	Gulu United FC (C, P)	14	8	4	2	21	9	+12	28	Promotion to 2010–11 Uganda Super League
2	UTODA FC(P)	14	6	5	3	25	13	+12	23	Qualification to promotion playoff
3	Bishop Nankyama FC	14	5	6	3	15	15	0	21	
4	Samba Boys FC	14	7	1	6	18	18	0	22	
5	Jinja MC Hippos FC	14	4	6	4	17	12	+5	18	
6	Mbale Heroes FC	14	5	3	6	15	26	−11	18	
7	Sharing Youth FC	14	5	2	7	16	18	−2	17	
8	Devine Waters FC	14	1	3	10	7	23	−16	6	

(C) Champions; (P) Promoted

=== Rwenzori Group ===
Pos	Team	Pld	W	D	L	GF	GA	GD	Pts	Promotion or qualification
1	Maroons FC (C, P)	14	11	2	1	34	11	+23	35	Promotion to 2010–11 Uganda Super League
2	Misindye FC	14	8	0	6	22	25	−3	24	Qualification to promotion playoff
3	KASE FC	14	7	2	5	31	18	+13	23	
4	Ndejje University FC	14	5	6	3	25	18	+7	21	
5	Jinja Arsenal FC	14	5	3	6	21	23	−2	18	
6	Mbarara United FC	14	5	2	7	17	25	−8	14 (Note: Mbabara United FC were docked 3 points and 3 goals for not honouring a fixture with Misindye FC.)	
7	Masaka Municipal Council FC	14	3	3	8	15	28	−13	12	
8	Fort Hills FC	14	2	2	10	12	32	−20	8	

(C) Champions; (P) Promoted

== Promotion playoff ==
=== Final ===
10 July 2010

Misindye FC	0-1	UTODA FC
		Michael Birungi

Kampala

== Championship playoff ==
=== Final ===
Gulu United FC	0-2	Maroons FC
	Report	Isaac Kitgyo (2)

Masindi
