= 2010–11 Uganda Super League =

Football season in Uganda

Uganda Super League
- Season: 2010–11
- Champions: Uganda Revenue Authority SC
- Top goalscorer: Diego Hamis Kiiza, Uganda Revenue Authority SC (14)

The 2010–11 Ugandan Super League was the 44th season of the official Ugandan football championship, the top-level football league of Uganda.

== Overview ==
The 2010–11 Uganda Super League was contested by 14 teams and was won by Uganda Revenue Authority SC, while Fire Masters and Gulu United FC were relegated.

== League standings ==
Pos	Team	Pld	W	D	L	GF	GA	GD	Pts	Qualification or relegation
1	Uganda Revenue Authority SC (C)	26	18	5	3	41	15	+26	59	Champions
2	Kampala City Council FC	26	14	6	6	26	14	+12	48	
3	Bunamwaya SC	26	14	5	7	27	18	+9	47	
4	Simba FC	26	12	6	8	20	16	+4	42	
5	Victors FC	26	10	9	7	33	22	+11	39	
6	SC Villa	26	9	12	5	22	11	+11	39	
7	Express FC	26	9	10	7	18	14	+4	37	
8	Proline FC	26	9	9	8	28	24	+4	36	
9	Police FC	26	8	7	11	18	21	−3	31	
10	Masaka Local Council FC	26	9	4	13	20	27	−7	31	
11	UTODA FC	26	7	7	12	19	34	−15	28	
12	Maroons FC	26	5	11	10	13	21	−8	26	
13	Fire Masters (R)	26	4	7	15	23	38	−15	19	Relegated
14	Gulu United FC (R)	26	3	4	19	11	44	−33	13	Relegated

(C) Champions; (R) Relegated

== Leading goalscorer ==
The top goalscorer in the 2010-11 season was Diego Hamis Kiiza of Uganda Revenue Authority SC with 14 goals.
