= FUFA Big League =

Ugandan association football league

- Founded: 2009
- Country: Uganda
- Confederation: CAF
- Divisions: 2
- Number of clubs: 16
- Level on pyramid: 2
- Promotion to: Uganda Premier League
- Relegation to: Regional Leagues
- Domestic cup(s): Uganda Cup & Pilsner Super 8
- Most championships: Maroons; (2 titles)
- Broadcaster(s): FUFA TV
- Website: fufa.co.ug
- Current: 2025–26 FUFA Big League

The Federation of Uganda Football Associations Big League, known simply as the Big League and for sponsorship purposes as the BetPawa Big League, is a professional association football league in Uganda. Contested by 16 clubs, it is the second-highest overall in the Ugandan football league system, sitting below the Uganda Premier League.

Each season, the two top-finishing teams in the Big League are automatically promoted to the Uganda Premier League. The team that finish the season in third place enter a play-off, with the winner also gaining promotion to the Uganda Premier League. The four lowest-finishing teams in the Big League are relegated to Regional Leagues.

== History ==
=== Original concept ===
The concept of re-structuring Ugandan football with the creation of a new second tier league was first mooted in October 2008 by the Federation of Uganda Football Associations. The idea that was single-handedly promoted by Eng. Moses Magogo was ridiculed, resisted, and fought by everyone. Although Magogo felt abandoned but he was buoyed by the inaugural clubs that were determined to proceed. Eventually out of persistence, Magogo won one by one convert and eventually the league was passed by the FUFA Executive Committee. The new national second division league, known as the FUFA Big League (FBL), was to cater for leading sides in the five regions. Second tier sides at that time competed at the regional level, with many of them failing to cope with advancement whenever they gained promotion to the national Super League.

FUFA Competitions Committee secretary, Moses Magogo, confirmed that qualification to the Super League through the regional mini leagues would be ended and replaced by promotion through the national first division league. A major objective of the initiative was to help raise the standard of football outside the Super League.

=== Administration ===
The FUFA Big League (FBL) is managed by the FUFA Competitions Committee and was launched on 6 August 6, 2009. The following clubs are eligible to play in the FBL:

- Clubs that participated in the Uganda Premier League (UPL) in the previous season and were relegated;
- Clubs that participated in the FBL in the previous season and were not relegated to the regional leagues;
- Clubs that participated in the FBL in the previous season and were not promoted to the UPL; and
- Clubs that are promoted from the FUFA Regional Competitions through an FBL Qualification Competition.

If there are more than 16 clubs in the FBL it is divided into two groups with each group being run as a league competition. However, if there are less than 17 clubs, the competition will be run as a single group league competition.

The Competitions Committee set stringent standards for member clubs covering computer literacy, a sound bank account, stadia that meet FUFA standards, qualified coaches and doctors. The initial requirements for clubs included:

- Payment of a sh250,000 registration fee;
- An office or physical address with a fixed telephone line, fax and e-mail address;
- A secretary with a minimum O-level qualification;
- Signing of legal declaration form covering discipline; and
- Submission of bank statements to the FUFA Competitions Committee.

=== Initial participants ===
The 16 clubs that competed in the first season of the FBL in 2009-10 were as follows:

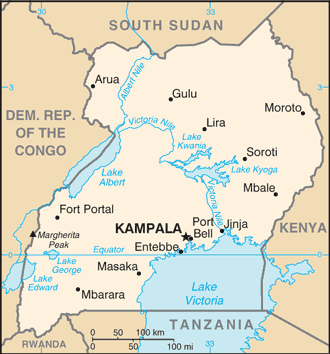
Uganda.

Participating clubs	Settlement	Position in the 2008/09 season
Bishop Nankyama FC	Bukalasa	Semi-finalists from Buganda Regional League
Devine Waters FC	Apac	Third placed team from North Regional Super Mini League
Fort Hills FC	Fort Portal	Third placed team from West Regional Super Mini League
Gulu United FC	Gulu	
Jinja Arsenal FC	Jinja	
Jinja Municipal Council Hippos FC	Jinja	Runner-up from East Regional Super Mini League
KASE FC	Kampala	Third placed team from Kampala Regional Super Mini League
Maroons FC	Kampala	Runners-up from Kampala Regional Super Mini League
Masaka Municipal Council FC	Masaka	
Mbale Heroes FC	Mbale	Third placed team from East Regional Super Mini League
Mbarara United FC	Mbarara	Fourteenth team in Uganda Super League
Misindye FC	Mukono	Third placed team from Buganda Regional Super Mini League
Ndejje University FC	Luwero	Runners-up from Buganda Regional Super Mini League
Samba Boys FC	Yumbe	Runners-up from North Regional Super Mini League
Sharing Youth FC	Kampala	Seventeenth team in Uganda Super League
UTODA FC	Kampala	Semi-finalists from Kampala Regional League

== Honours ==
=== Big League Championship Playoffs ===
Season	Champions	Result	Runner-up	Venue
2009-10	Maroons FC	2-0	Gulu United FC	Masindi Municipal Stadium, Masindi
2010-11	Maji FC	5-2	Hoima-Busia FC	Njeru Stadium, Jinja
2011-12	Entebbe Young FC	1-0	Kiira Young	Namboole Stadium, Kampala
2012-13	Bright Stars FC	2-1	CRO FC	Mehta Stadium, Lugazi
2013-14	Lweza FC	2-1	Sadolin Bugembe FC	KCCA STADIUM, Lugogo
2014–15	Maroons FC	1-0	The Saints FC	Phillip Omondi Stadium
2015–16	Kirinya Jinja SS	2-0	Onduparaka FC	Nakivubo Stadium
2016–17	Maroons FC	2-1	Masavu FC	Phillip Omondi Stadium
2017–18	Ndejje University FC	1-0	Nyamityobora FC	Star Times Stadium, Lugogo
2018–19	Proline FC	1-0	Wakiso Giants FC	Star Times Stadium, Lugogo

=== Big League Promotion Playoffs ===
Season	Winners	Result	Runner-up	Venue
2009-10	UTODA FC	1-0	Misindye FC	Kampala
2010-11	Bul FC	1-0 [aet]	Iganga Municipal Council FC	
2011-12	SC Victoria University	4-0	Aurum Roses FC	Namboole Stadium, Kampala
2012-13	Soana FC	3-0	Koboko FC	Mehta Stadium, Lugazi
2015–16	Proline FC	4–1	Sporting United (Lira)	Nakivubo Stadium
2017–18	Paidha Black Angels FC	0–0 (p. 4-2)	Kitara FC	Star Times Stadium, Lugogo
2018-19	Kyetume FC	4–1	Kansai Plascon FC	Star Times Stadium, Lugogo

=== Big League Group honours ===
==== Elgon Group ====
Season	Group Winners	Playoff Qualifier 1	Playoff Qualifier 2
2009-10	Gulu United FC (P)	UTODA FC (P)	
2010-11	Hoima-Busia FC (P)	Bul FC (P)	Iganga Municipal Council FC
2011-12	Entebbe Young FC (P)	Mbarara Old Timers FC	CRO FC
2012-13	CRO FC (P)	Soroti Garage FC	Mbale Heroes FC
2013-14	Sadolin Paints FC (P)	KJT Rwenshama (P)	Kirinya Jinja SSS
2014-15	Maroons FC (P)		
2015-16			
2016-17	Maroons FC (P)	Ndejje University	Kiira United
2017-18	Ndejje University (P)	Paidha Black Angels (P)	Kyetume FC
2018-19	Wakiso Giants FC (P)	Kyetume FC (P)	UPDF
2019-20			

==== Rwenzori Group ====
Season	Group Winners	Playoff Qualifier 1	Playoff Qualifier 2
2009-10	Maroons FC (P)	Misindye FC	
2010-11	Maji FC (P)	Boroboro Tigers FC	CRO FC
2011-12	Kiira Young (P)	SC Victoria University (P)	Aurum Roses FC
2012-13	Bright Stars FC (P)	Soana FC (P)	Koboko FC
2013-14	Lweza FC (P)	Baza Holdings	Mutundwe Lions
2014-15	The Saints FC (P)		
2015-16			
2016-17	Masavu FC (P)	Synergy FC	Mbarara City FC (P)
2017-18	Nyamityobora FC (P)	Kitara FC	Kabale Sharp FC
2018-19	Proline FC (P)	Kansai Plascon FC	Dove FC
2019-20			

=== Single table era ===
Season	Winner	Runner-Up	Third Place
2021-22	Blacks Power (P)	Maroons (P)	Kyetume
2022-23	Kitara (P)	Mbarara City (P)	NEC (P)

=== Player Honours ===
Season	Most Valuable Player	Top Scorer
2014–15		Fred Kalanzi, Lweza FC (9 goals)
2015–16	Muhammad Shaban, Onduparaka FC	Edrisa Lubega, Proline FC (19 goals)
2016–17		Patrick Kaddu, Maroons FC (16 goals)
2017–18		
2018–19	Bright Anukani, Proline FC	Ivan Bogere, Proline FC (14 goals)

== Sponsorship ==
On 1 November 2013, it was announced that the Airtel Telecommunications company had signed a four-year contract providing a total of 400 million shillings (about 160,000 US dollars) towards funding different activities under both the FUFA Big League and the Ugandan Cup until 2016.

== See also ==
- Football in Uganda
