= Kansai Plascon FC =

Ugandan football club

- Ground: Kyabazinga Stadium, Bugembe, Uganda
- Capacity: 3000
- League: FUFA Big League
Home Colours colours	Away Colours colours

Kansai Plascon FC (formerly known as Sadolin Paints FC) are a Ugandan football club from Bugembe, Uganda. They were relegated from the Uganda Premier League in the 2016–17 season and currently play in the FUFA Big League.

They were promoted from the FUFA Big League in 2013-14 and spent three years in the Uganda Premier League. Sadolin Paints reached the Ugandan cup semifinals in 2016–17, losing to second division side Paidha Black Angels 3–2 on aggregate.

In 2015, they were managed by Dutch coach Jacques Van der Walt, only the second foreign manager in the Uganda Premier League. He was demoted in 2015.

== Name ==
The club were known as Sadolin Paints FC during their time in the Uganda Premier League through sponsorship. However, Sadolin Paints in Uganda lost the right to use that trade name in 2017 and were bought by Kansai Plascon. The team rebranded to Kansai Plascon for the 2018 season.
