= Onduparaka =

Onduparaka is a village in Ayivu County, Arua District in Uganda.

The soccer team Onduparaka FC got its name from this place and its official home ground – Greenlight Stadium – off the main road after the junction. Ondu paraka in Lugbara language means 'sorghum stem'. A lot of sorghum used to be grown in Onduparaka and traded to the Democratic Republic of Congo, a few kilometers west.
