= Nyamityobora FC =

Association football club in Uganda

Nyamityobora Football Club
- Nyamityobora FC logo
- Full name: Nyamityobora Football Club
- Nickname: Abanyakore The Ankole Bulls
- Ground: Kakyeka studium
- Owner: Community Club
- Manager: Sulait Makumbi
- Coach: Alex Isabirye Musongola
- League: FUFA Big League
Home colours colours	colours

Nyamityobora Football Club, also Nyamityobora FC, is a football club based in Mbarara, in the Western Region of Uganda.

== History ==
Nyamityobora played in the Uganda Premier League for the 2018–19 season following their promotion from winning the FUFA Big League Rwenzori Division in the 2017/2018 Ugandan football season. They won the western regional league playoffs in 2016. They were relegated after only one season in the top flight.

The club contests the Mbarara derby against Mbarara City FC, who they beat for their first-ever victory in the top flight.
