= Kiira Young FC =

Ugandan football club

Kira Young
- Full name: Kira Young Football Club
- Founded: 2010; 16 years ago
- Ground: Mandela National Stadium, Kampala
- Capacity: 45,200
- Manager: (Uganda) George Ssemwogerere
- League: Ugandan Super League

Kira Young Football Club, or short Kira Young FC, is a Ugandan football club from Kampala. The club was founded in 2010 and primarily uses the Mandela National Stadium in Kampala as its home ground. The club has experienced several changes in league status. However, the club was relegated at the end of the 2014/15 season and subsequently demoted to the fourth division in April 2016 for failing to honor multiple fixtures in the second division (FUFA Big League).

They play in the top division of Ugandan football, the Ugandan Super League.

== Stadium ==
Currently the team plays its home games at the 45,200 seater Mandela National Stadium.

== See also ==
- Acholi Queens FC
- Afriyea Golf Academy
- Arua Hill S.C.
- Asubo Ladies FC
