= CRO FC =

Association football club in Uganda

Child Restoration Outreach Football Club
- Founded: 2000
- Ground: Mbale Municipal Stadium
- League: Ugandan Super League
- 2013–14: 16th

Child Restoration Outreach Football Club or simply CRO FC is a football club in Mbale, Uganda. They play in the top level of Ugandan professional football, the Ugandan Super League. They were relegated in 2008. Mbale Municipal Stadium is their home stadium; it has a capacity of 10,000. CRO has played in different national leagues in Uganda and these include Uganda Premier League where it retained the championship for three consecutive times. FUFA Super League is a football competition CRO participates in.

CRO FC is governed by Federation of Uganda Football Association (FUFA). The football club plays in Under 16/17, FUFA District 4th Division league, Uganda Super League, Uganda Big League and other tournaments organized by FUFA in Uganda and is Registered with the Uganda Youth Football Association (UYFA), an association managing football academies in Uganda.

== History ==
CRO football is a professional football club that was founded in 2000. this club was founded with the mission of developing abilities of the children that have been on street towns of Mbale Town through sports with the slogan "The Raider". this club is found in Mbale one of the towns in the Eastern Uganda.

CRO FC has been an associate of Federation of Uganda Football Association (FUFA) since 2000. From that time club have a number of teams that have been majoring in the FUFA Eastern Regional League, FUFA District 4^{th} League, under 16/17 FUFA tournament among others. CRO FC is also registered with the Uganda Youth Football Association (UYFA). UYFA is responsible for all football academies that operates in Uganda. This has helped the children from the CRO FC academy to compete in all competition because UYFA is the foundation of Ugandan translation.

== See also ==
- Biharwe FC
- Arua Hill S.C.
- Entebbe UPPC
- Entebbe Young Football Club
