= Lweza FC =

Ugandan football club

- Full name: Lweza Football Club
- Founded: 2011
- Ground: Mutesa II Stadium, Kampala
- Capacity: 40,000
- Chairman: Ahmed Ddamulira
- Head coach: (Uganda) Joseph Mutyaba
- League: Ugandan Premier League

Lweza Football Club was a football club based in Kampala, Uganda. They played their home games at the Mutesa II Stadium in Wankuluku.

== History ==
The club competed in the Uganda's top flight Premier League. The Kajjansi based side was founded in 1990 to provide a premier-level experience through professional training and player development programs built upon the international guidelines.

Lweza football Club developed into one of the largest and successful sports clubs in Uganda, boasting over 70 players in both professional and youth teams.

Lweza FC was a non-profit association that worked in conjunction with committee members, players, volunteers, coaches and managers to provide a football club for the whole community. It relied on volunteers for its success and all money raised was used to benefit the club and the surrounding community.

In 2017, the club was sold to Jude Mbabali, a lawyer and politician, who later moved the club's base from Kajjansi to Masaka.

== Achievements ==
- FUFA Regionals Cup
  - Winners (1): 2013
- FUFA Big League
  - Runners-up (1): 2014
