= Bugembe =

- Map of Uganda showing the location of Bugembe.
- Coordinates: 00°28′03″N 33°14′29″E
- District: Jinja District
- Elevation: 1,269 m (4,163 ft)

Population (2011 Estimate)
  - Total: 33,100
- Time zone: UTC+3 (EAT)

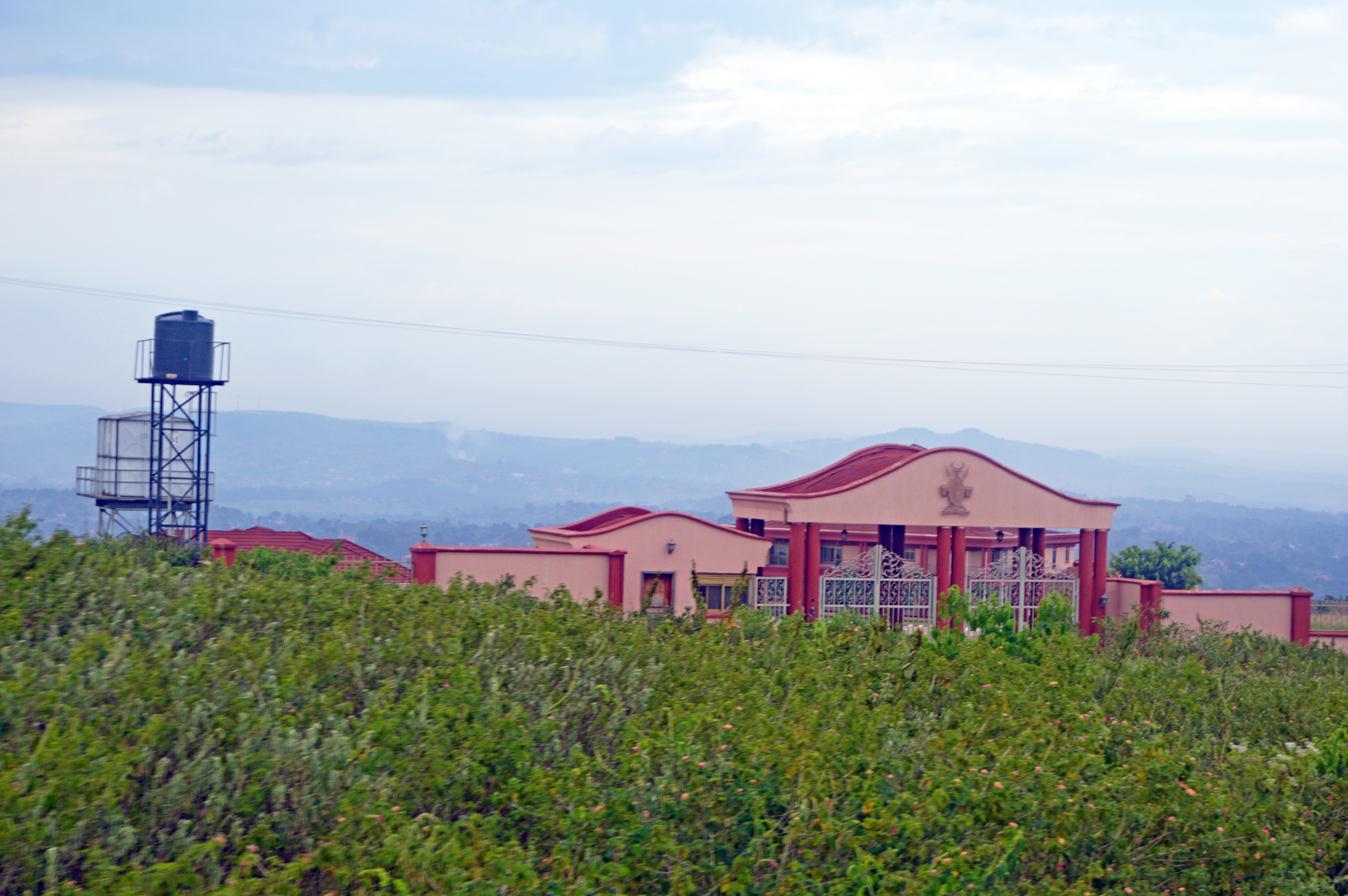
Kyabazingas palace at Wanyange

Bugembe is a town in Jinja District in the Eastern Region of Uganda. It is the seat of the Kingdom of Busoga, one of the four constitutional in Uganda, which is coterminous with the Busoga sub-region.

== Location ==
Bugembe is located approximately 8 kilometres (5.0 mi), by road, in Jinja district the largest city in the sub-region. The town is located on the highway between Jinja and Iganga. The coordinates of Bugembe are:0°28'03.0"N, 33°14'29.0"E (Latitude:0.467500; Longitude:33.241389). The town sits at an average elevation of 1,269 metres (4,163 ft) above sea level.

== History ==
In November 1987, the forest near Bugembe was the site of the final defeat of Alice Lakwena's Holy Spirit Movement during their march on Kampala as part of the War in Uganda.

== Population ==
In 2002, the national census counted the town's population as 26,268. In 2010, the Uganda Bureau of Statistics estimated the population at 32,200. In 2011, the bureau estimated the mid-year population at 33,100.

== Points of interest ==
The following points of interest lie within the town limits or near the edges of town:

- offices of Bugembe Town Council
- Headquarters of the Kingdom of Busoga
- Bugembe Police Barracks
- Nakanyangi Primary School
- Jinja Lake View Primary School
- Nakanyonyi Girls' Secondary School
- St. Thaddeus Secondary School
- Bugembe central market
- Bugembe Health Center
- St. Florence Secondary School
- Vic View High School
- Wanyange Girls' Secondary School

== See also ==
- Kyabazinga
