= Entebbe Young Football Club =

Association football club in Uganda

Entebbe Young Football Club, alternatively called Entebbe FC, is a football club from Entebbe, Uganda.

They play in the second division of Ugandan football, the FUFA Big League.

The clubs plays in yellow and black kits.

== Stadium ==
The team's home matches are held at Entebbe Municipal Stadium where they usually draw a vast crowd of supporters.

== See also ==
- List of football clubs in Uganda
- Biharwe FC
- Proline FC
