= Mbarara City FC =

Association football club in Uganda

Mbarara City
- MBARARA CITY LOGO
- Full name: Mbarara City Football Club
- Nickname: Ankole Lions
- Founded: Mbarara City FC was formed on 25th August 2016 after a merger between Citizens FC and Wakiso Town Council FC. The club played in the 2nd tier of Ugandan Football; the Big League that season (2016/17) and immediately gained promotion to the Uganda Premier League
- Ground: Kakyeka Stadium, Mbarara
- Capacity: 1,500
- President: Hon Mwine Mpaka Rwamirama
- Manager: Charles Livingstone Mbabazi
- League: Uganda Premier League
- 2025–26: 12th
Home colours

Mbarara City Football Club is a Ugandan football club in Mbarara City, Uganda. The team plays in the top division of Ugandan professional football, the Star Times Uganda Premier League where they have been participating since 5 May 2017, after defeating Synergy FC in the FUFA Big League Play Offs, and the club uses Kakyeka Stadium as their home hosting grounds. Mbarara City FC has more fans than any other team in the Western Region of Uganda.

== History ==
The club was founded in 2010 as Citizens FC, after the management of Citizens High School in Mbarara decided to create a team to play in mature competitions and help in nurturing football at the school. The team played in the Western Uganda regional league starting from 2010 to 2014. In 2014, the team won the Western Uganda Regional League and was promoted to the FUFA Big League. In July 2016, Citizens FC was renamed Mbarara City FC, mainly to get acceptability and fan base among the people of Mbarara and the whole of Western Uganda. This coincided with the club being promoted to the topflight, the Uganda Premier League in its first season after adopting the name Mbarara City FC. The club clinched promotion after defeating Synergy 2–1 in the FUFA Big League playoffs on 5 May 2017.

=== 2017/2018 Uganda Premier League Season ===
Mbarara City FC participated in the Uganda Premier League Season, the first division of the Uganda football league. In their first season in the top flight, it was the only team out of 16 that was based in Western Uganda. Its first game was played against Bul FC on 12 September 2017, and the result was a goalless draw. This was followed by a 1–0 win against Express FC with a goal scored by Pitis Barenge, a Burundian International in the 73rd minute on 16 September. The club finished 11th, avoiding relegation.

=== 2018/19 Uganda Premier League Season ===
Mbarara City were excluded from the Uganda Premier League at the start of the season, after failing a ground inspection, but appealed the exclusion and were reinstated. Mbarara City were on top of the standings just after eight games with sixteen points. Paul Mucurezi scored the only goal against Bul to take Mbarara City to the top of the table for the first time in history. Mbarara City won its first four home games, a club record. Their first round match was rescheduled after they moved to the Kavumba recreation ground. Mbarara City played 3 matches at Kavumba and won all of them (Mbarara City 3-1 Express, Mbarara City 2-0 Maroons & Mbarara City 2-1 Villa). The club has since returned to Kakyeka stadium in Mbarara.

=== 2019 - 2020 Premier League Season ===
During the 2019-2020 season, Mbarara City FC participated in the Uganda Premier League. The season was impacted by the COVID-19 pandemic, which led to an early conclusion on May 20, 2020. By that time, Mbarara City FC had played 24 matches, achieving 9 wins, 6 draws, and 9 losses and finishing in 7th place with 33 points.

2020 - 2021 Premier League Season

In the 2020-2021 season, Mbarara City FC solidified its presence in the Uganda Premier League, playing home matches at Kakyeka Stadium. The team finished in 7th place again, with victories against SC Villa and a draw against Vipers SC. The statistics were 10 wins, 11 draws, and 9 losses, including playing 6 games without a loss. Mbarara City did not lose their last four matches in the competition.

Striker Jude Ssemugabi shifted from shirt 11 to 9, and defender Bamba Soulymane wore shirt 5, having put on 4 last season. Key players like Jude Ssemugabi, Hilary Mukundane, and Innocent Wafula were instrumental in both defense and attack. Despite challenges, including injuries, the club’s strategy of a solid defense and effective counterattacks helped secure crucial points.

2021 - 2022 Premier League Season

The 2021-2022 season was a challenging period for Mbarara City FC in the Uganda Premier League. The club faced significant difficulties, both on and off the pitch. Financial constraints were a major issue, and these were worsened by the loss of a key sponsorship deal with Top Bet. This financial strain impacted the club’s ability to retain and attract top talent, leading to the departure of several key players, including Ivan Eyam, Bashir Mutanda, and Innocent Wafula.

On the field, Mbarara City FC struggled to find consistent form. The team experienced a series of poor results, which ultimately led to their relegation. Despite these challenges, the club managed to secure some notable performances, including a win against Vipers SC at St. Mary’s Kitende. With 22 points in 28 games, the club finished the season in 15th place, a position that both ended their 5-year stay in the top flight and saw them drop to the second tier, the FUFA Big League. The departure of head coach Livingstone Mbabazi to Arua Hill SC further destabilized the team. His replacement, Kefa Kisala, also left the club shortly after his appointment, leading to Hussein Mbalangu taking over as caretaker manager. He later resigned due to arrears.

2022 - 2023 FUFA Big League

The 2022-2023 season began with some uncertainty due to the loss of several key players during the preseason. However, the team quickly found its footing, starting the campaign with a decisive 3-1 victory over Booma FC.

Under head coach Sadiq Ssempijja, Mbarara City FC maintained a competitive edge in the league. Notable performances included a crucial win against Jinja North United and a series of unbeaten matches that bolstered their position in the standings. At the end of the season, the team finished runners-up and was promoted back to the Uganda Premier League.

== Stadium ==
The team play their home games at Kakyeka Stadium, in Mbarara City, which has a capacity of 10,000. The stadium is also home to other regional football tournaments in western Uganda.

== Supporters ==
The bulk of Mbarara City FC supporters come from the Western Ugandan districts of Mbarara, Isingiro, Ibanda, Kiruhura, Ntungamo, Sheema, Bushenyi and the country's Capital City of Kampala.

== Notable players ==
- Paul Mucureezi
- Hillary Mukundane
- Ivan Eyam
- Ali Kimera
- Ibrahim Orit
- Makueth Wol
- Brian Aheebwa
- Jude Ssemugabi
- Martin Elugant

== Achievements ==
- Western Regional League: 1

2014

- FUFA Big League Playoffs: 1

2017
