= Proline FC =

Association football club in Uganda

Proline
- Full name: Proline Football Club
- Founded: 2006; 20 years ago
- Ground: Lugogo Stadium, Kampala
- Capacity: 3,000
- Chairman: Mujib Kasule
- Manager: Shafik Bisaso
- League: Regional leagues
- 2021–22: 9th, FUFA Big League (relegated)
Home colours

Proline FC, or short Proline, is a Ugandan professional football based in Kampala, currently competing in the Ugandan regional leagues.

== History ==
The team was founded in 2006 and was promoted to the top flight Uganda Premier League in 2007. Proline played seven seasons before finishing 15th and being relegated in 2013–14. In 2007, Proline invited Rio Ferdinand to Uganda, where he met with Ugandan President Yoweri Museveni.

Proline won the FUFA Big League playoff in 2016 to return to the top flight, beating Sporting United 4–1 in the deciding match. 2016 Big League top scorer Edrisa Lubega won a key penalty to secure promotion.

Proline were relegated from the Premier League a second time in the 2017–18 season after failing to beat URA. Even with their relegation the 2018–19 season was one of the best in club history, winning the Elgon group of the FUFA Big League on the final match day to clinch promotion and then two weeks later winning the 2018–19 Uganda Cup on penalties as a lower division side. Proline won 5–4 on penalties after a 1–1 stalemate, with Mujuzi Musitafa claiming tournament MVP and joint top scorer. They also beat Wakiso Giants 1–0 in the Big League championship match to win the second division title.

The cup win qualified Proline for the 2019 CECAFA Cup, but they were eliminated in the group stage, only winning one of their three matches.

Proline were relegated to the third division in 2022 after having a bye on their final match day which allowed other teams to bypass them in the table.

== See also ==
- List of football clubs in Uganda

== Honours ==
- Uganda Cup
  - Winners (1): 2018–19
- FUFA Big League (second division)
  - Champions (1): 2018–19

== Stadium ==
Currently the team plays at the 3000 capacity Lugogo Stadium.
