= SC Victoria University =

Association football club in Uganda

SCVU
- Full name: Sports Club Victoria University
- Founded: 2011
- Ground: Mandela National Stadium, Kampala
- Capacity: 45,000
- Chairman: Simo Dubajic
- Head coach: Morley Byekwaso
- League: Ugandan Super League
- 2012-13: 5th place
Home colours	Away colours

Sports Club Victoria University (SCVU) is a Ugandan football club, based in Kampala. They play their home games at the Mandela National Stadium.

== History ==
SCVU was formed on 19 August 2011, and played in the Uganda Big League, winning the play-off final 4–0 against Aurum Roses to gain promotion to the Uganda Premier League. First Head Coach in history of SC Victoria University was Serbian tactician Ivan Zoric. Following the promotion of Sports Club Victoria University (SCVU) to the Uganda Super League in 2012, SCVU finished fifth in the 2012–13 season and won its first major trophy, the Uganda Cup in 2013. SCVU played in the 2014 CAF Confederation Cup, losing to CS Don Bosco in the first round.

In 2014 Uganda Cup, SCVU was knocked out at the semifinals round by KCC FC by an aggregate score of 2–1, goals all after the second leg at Namboole which ended in a goalless draw.

== Achievements ==
- Ugandan Cup
  - Winners (1): 2013
- Ugandan Super Cup
  - Runners-up (1): 2013
