= Lugogo Stadium =

Cricket ground in Kampala, Uganda

- Lugogo Cricket Oval
- Interactive map of Lugogo Stadium

Ground information
- Location: Kampala, Uganda
- Country: Uganda
- Coordinates: 0.3259°N 32.6041°E
- Establishment: 1957
- Capacity: 5,000 (cricket), 8,000 (football), 20,000 (concerts)
- End names
- n/a

International information
- First men's T20I: 20 May 2019: Uganda v Botswana
- Last men's T20I: 24 May 2019: Uganda v Nigeria
- First women's T20I: 6 April 2019: Kenya v Zimbabwe
- Last women's T20I: 22 April 2023: Rwanda v Tanzania

Team information
Uganda	(1957–present)
- As of 22 April 2023; Source: Ground profile

Lugogo Stadium, also known as Lugogo Cricket Oval, is a cricket ground in Kampala, Uganda. The first recorded match held on the ground came in 1957 when Kenya Asians played Sunder Cricket Club. It has also gained popularity as a music concert venue in Uganda.

In that same year Uganda first used the ground when the national team played the Sunder Cricket Club. The ground held its inaugural first-class match when an East African Invitation XI played the touring Marylebone Cricket Club in 1963.

A further first-class match followed in 1967 when a combined East Africa team played the touring Indians. The next first-class matches to be held on the ground didn't come until 2005, when Uganda played two matches there in the Intercontinental Cup against Kenya and Namibia. The Lugogo Stadium is the only cricket venue in Uganda to have held first-class cricket.

Surrounding the cricket ground there are tennis courts and a football ground which is the home ground of Kampala City Council FC.

The stadium is scheduled for redevelopment in 2024.
