= Onduparaka FC =

Association football club in Uganda

- Full name: Onduparaka Football Club
- Nickname: The Green Caterpillars
- Founded: October 2011; 14 years ago
- Ground: AbaBet Greenlight Stadium, Arua
- Capacity: 2,000
- Chairman: Benjamin Nyakuni
- League: Ugandan Premier League
- 2018: 4th
- Website: http://onduparakafc.co.ug/
colours

Onduparaka Football Club is a Ugandan football club currently playing in the FUFA Big League. They play home games at Greenlight Stadium in Onduparaka, a suburb of Arua. The club's name means 'sorghum stem' in the Lugbara language while motto is: "The struggle continues".

== Amateur era ==
Onduparaka FC was formed in late October 2011 by Joe Erema and Benjamin Nyakuni, who had graduated from Makerere University Business School. Originally, the club was intended to benefit students and young people and enable them to play in inter-village competitions. The team was strictly amateur and created so that the youth would be kept on the path of moral uprightness through a healthy passion for competitive games. After only one year of participation, the team renamed themselves Onduparaka Football Club and got promoted from the Ugandan Big League to the Azam Uganda Premier League (AUPL) at the end of the 2015/2016 season.

== 2015–16 season ==
Onduparaka appointed former South Sudan national team coach Leo Adraa as their first Uganda Premier League head coach to replace Allan Kabonge whose contract expired after promoting the club to the top flight league and reaching the Uganda Cup Final. He later became the Technical Director. In August 2016, Charles Livingstone Mbabazi was named Head Coach and Adraa became the Assistant Coach while Moses "Ugoboss" Oloya became Goalkeeping Coach.

In 2016, Onduparaka FC lost in the 42nd Uganda Cup Final by 3–1 to Vipers SC, their first appearance in the final.

== 2016–17 season ==
During 2017, their first season in the top flight, Onduparaka FC was the only UPL team unbeaten at home.

One of the club's targets in its maiden top-flight season was to avoid relegation. By the end of the first round of matches, Onduparaka had climbed to the top four. The last time an upcountry team won the league was in 1999 by Dairy Heroes from Mbale

They started the season with a goalless draw against Soana, then lost to Bright Stars before drawing again on 6 September 2016, this time with Express FC. The fourth game was against defending champions KCCA who had won all their first three games. Ondu needed a quick second half brace by Muhammad Shaban to inflict the first season loss to the 11-time champions on 9 September 2016 at Greenlight Stadium.

Despite a late onslaught, the visitors only managed a consolation goal; that was Onduparaka's first Uganda Premier League win. On 1 October 2016, SC Villa scored first, then the newcomers from Arua crawled back scoring three through Caesar Okhuti, Wahab Ajuman Gadafi and Muhammad Shaban.

The visitors fought back from 3–1 down until they equalised via a penalty netted by Tabu Vitalis but Shaban scored his second of the game. The match took place at Greenlight Stadium. A week before, Ondu beat Police FC 2–1 on the same ground (with goals by Shaban and Kabon). Three days prior to Ondu ending Villa's unbeaten run, FUFA cleared 26-year-old Caesar Okhuti to play for the Northwesterners who sat at 5th on the table; he was on loan from KCCA. On 10 December 2016, Ondu beat Sadolin FC 1–0 at Bugembe Stadium to climb to 3rd place around half season courtesy of a Gaddafi free-kick.

Ondu's leading goalscorer Muhammad Shaban (aka [I]jagason) was voted the 2016 FUFA MVP (Most Valuable Player) in a year when Mamelodi Sundowns goalkeeper Denis Onyango also performed well and actually won the CAF Best Player in Africa Award and Farouk Miya scored the goal against Comoros that took Uganda to the tournament. In 2017, the three travelled to Gabon for AFCON. Also on Onduparaka's squad is KCCA loanee Caesar Okhuti.

Other players on the 2017 Onduparaka team included: Richard Anyama (goalkeeper formerly at Saints FC), Nisar Kasim (another Goalkeeper), Alex Gasper Adriko (aka The Rock), Norman Saddam, Rashid Toha, Gibson Adinho, Akram Kakembo, Ivan Mbowa, Ibrahim Faizul (aka Anini), Sabir Simba, Dickens Okwir, Mohammad Rashid, Ajobe Toto, Denis Andama, Rashid Agau, Living Kabon, Wahab Ajuman Gaddafi Gadinho and Fahd Muhammad Toko.

On 17 February 2017, Azam TV broadcast a live game from Onduparaka's Greenlight Stadium for the first time. Kabon Living (also known as Messi), scored the only goal of the game from a Shaban assist in the 88th minute to give Ondu a win over Kirinya Jinja SS. Kabon took off his shirt, somersaulted in the goal celebration and got a yellow card for indecency but his goal leapfrogged Ondu to 3rd place next to SC Villa and KCCA.

They dropped points with humiliating away defeats to KCCA (7–0 at the Phillip Omondi Stadium in Lugogo - Record Biggest Loss in Uganda Premier League) and SC Villa (4–1 at Masaka Recreation Ground) but bounced back. Starting the day in sixth place on 1 April 2017 with a chance to climb to 4th with a win at Kakindu Stadium in Jinja after Vipers SC had already lost to a different Jinja side, Gaddafi scored one of the Contenders for Goal of the Season against Jinja Municipal Council who salvaged a 1–1 draw. On 5 April 2017, Muhammad Shaban's first half goal was enough to beat nine-man Lweza at Greenlight Stadium and end a three match winless streak. In their first international friendly of the season, Onduparaka beat Gor Mahia 2–0 at Mandela National Stadium Nambole on 4 February 2017.

Kizza Besigye, the four time Runner-up in the Ugandan Presidential Elections, watched the game clad in a green jersey and offered Onduparaka FC 2 million Uganda shillings. Then on 21 February 2017, Onduparaka came from a goal down to beat Mbarara FC and advance to the Uganda Cup Round of 16. Airtel - FUFA MVP Shaban missed a penalty but Okhuti scored the winner in a 2–1 triumph at Kakyeka Stadium in Mbarara. On 26 March 2017, goals from Okhuti again and a returning Rashid Agau helped Ondu knock out Big League team Water FC and qualify for the quarterfinals.

On 9 April 2017, Sadolin Paints FC knocked Onduparaka out of the Uganda Cup by 2–1 in Jinja. Nevertheless, Onduparaka's Greenlight Stadium was chosen to host the 43rd Uganda Cup Final (KCCA defeated Paidha Black Angels 2–0 in June 2017). In a UPL fixture twelve days later, the Painters left Onduparaka with a point after a 0–0 draw. According to Coach Livingstone Mbabazi, his side created the most chances in the league during the 2017 season. He added that his "players don't fear big teams" because they know that they are big too though recovering from a 2–1 loss to Soana where substitute Shaban scored the consolation on 29 April 2017.

Ondu was one of the only two teams in the AUPL still unbeaten at home going into the Game Week 27 Fixture against Express FC on 5 May 2017. Livingstone's first game as Onduparaka Coach was at Wankulukuku and ended 1–1.

The return leg almost seemed to be heading in that direction with Express taking the lead through Didier Jean within the first halfhour after assistant captain Rashid Toha (towering defender nicknamed Per Mertesacker) slipped and Express capitalised. Ondu badly needed an equaliser after all their wasted chances; Muhammad Shaban hit the woodwork and missed other chances. Kickoff was in sunny weather but even the winds could not discourage the many high balls. Then just before halftime, Dickens Okwir was fouled in the penalty box by the Express captain.

Toha scored the equaliser in the 41st minute.

Shaban played well but missed a good opportunity for the winner close to extratime. Four minutes were added and Rashid Toha scored the winner in the 3rd additional minute to send the stadium into a glorious frenzy. As the celebrations waned, Agau - the substitute for Caesar Okhuti was substituted with Caesar Olega, a fairytale of two Caesars crossing the line before and after the winner. A few seconds later, the final whistle was blown.

Coach Leo Adraa said that Ondu had more time to prepare unlike the Oldest Club in Ugandan football who were thumped four goals by Lweza in their previous game. Kampala musician Kalifah Aganaga was present donning a green Onduparaka jersey. Arua musician and producer King Weedah was also at the game. This win propelled the Caterpillars from 6th to 5th Position out of 16 above Express who remained with 40 points with three games left to the end of the season.

Four points behind 3rd-placed Vipers, the Caterpillars needed a win to reduce the gap to within one point. They were beaten 4–1 at the St. Mary's Kitende Stadium in Kajjansi on 9 May 2017. The game was marred with violence. That same day, KCCA were crowned Champions for the second consecutive year. In the last home game of the season, Muhammad Shaban scored in the 16th minute but Saints FC equalised just before halftime.

The army side needed only one point, that is a draw to be safe from relegation and leave the battle for survival to Lweza and Police; JMC Hippos had already been relegated. Caesar Okuti replaced Dickens Okwir in the second half while Denis Andama (aka Koko Makosa) later replaced Gasper. Saints goalie Alex Mugabi hit himself on the goalpost while trying to save a goal attempt and seriously needed medical attention; he was stretchered off and replaced by Harrison Sempajji who made a number of saves from rejuvenated Onduparaka attacks.

Mohammad Rashid was replaced with Rashid Agau, the darling of Ondu fans and minutes later, Kabon Living was fouled in the penalty box. Captain Rashid Toha stepped up to convert the spotkick. Close to the end of normal time, Richard Anyama in the Ondu goal who had been transferred from Saints in January (along with Ivan Mbowa) conceded the second equaliser from a freekick. It seemed like the visitors were safe but after the four additional minutes were over, Kabon also known as Messi scored and relegated the Saints. Armymen cocked their guns while disgruntled visiting fans and officials pursued the referee plus his linesmen.

After the chaos subsided minutes later, the game resumed until the 100th minute but Ondu still maintained their Unbeaten Record at home in their maiden top flight season. The last team to defeat them at Greenlight Stadium was Nebbi Central three years behind. In the final game of the season at Kakindu Stadium in Jinja, Dickens Okwir put Ondu ahead in the 28th minute while BUL FC had a goal disallowed immediately after. However, after some pressure, the hosts equalised in the 57th minute. This season finale in which Ibrahim Faizul was redcarded ended 1–1.

Onduparaka ended their first Azam Uganda Premier League season in 5th place on 45 points. Despite a negative goal difference, Ondu managed 11 wins, 12 draws and 7 losses in 30 games. At the Uganda Premier League Awards on 27 July 2017, Muhammad Shaban was included in the Azam UPL Team of the Year. During that season, each player in the list received 250,000 UgX. Meanwhile, Ondu fans were voted the Best Fans in the same gala at Kampala's Imperial Royale.

=== 2017–18 season ===
Shaban and Rashid Toha were sponsored for trials in South Africa but returned in the middle of July 2017. During pre-season with some new players, Onduparaka won 1–0 in their first friendly before beating Nyowa Young Elephants 4–1 with goals from Caesar Okhuti, Dickens Okwi and newcomer Karim Ndugwa who netted a brace. Then they visited Masindi (1–1, Ndugwa again) and Hoima. In the rain on Eid Adha Day (1 September 2017), Ondu beat JKS 3–0 with goals from Agau, Gadinho and Shaban who was returning from injury. Three days later, Betway announced a 600 Million Shilling sponsorship package for Onduparaka's transport and player welfare. 7 September, they would face Jinja Kirinya SS in a friendly.

The 2018 UPL season started on 12 September 2017 and Ondu drew 0–0 with Proline FC at Greenlight Stadium despite 6 additional minutes in the second half. Four days later amidst a transfer request from Shaban who later joined KCCA, veteran Caesar Okhuti scored twice away to Maroons in Luzira to give Ondu their first win of the season. On 19 September 2017, KCCA whipped Ondu 4–1. On 27 September 2017, Ondu beat Police FC 1–0 in Arua. On 14 October 2017 in Arua, Ondu beat Soana FC 2–0 with early goals from Captain Rashid Toha (1st minute) and the debutant from Jinja Municipal Council - Viane Sekajugo (ninth minute).

Ondu pushed to the same 10 points with the table leaders but in 3rd place while Soana remained second last with four points. Earlier that day, MTN Uganda had announced a one-year 390 Million UgX sponsorship deal for Onduparaka FC. During a press conference at Desert Breeze Hotel Arua, Val Oketcho, the MTN Uganda Corporate Communications Manager handed over a dummy cheque to Ondu Patron Honourable Bernard Atiku (who is the former Ayivu County MP, and the current Land Board Chairman - Arua City). 21 October 2017, Ondu beat Express FC 2–1 at Wankulukuku to go top of the table (until the following Wednesday when an own goal by Kirinya Jinja SS at Nambole propelled Police FC to the summit on goal difference).

Alfred Leku's 46th-minute goal and an acrobatic 92nd minute volley from veteran Caesar Okhuti (who has played for both teams) gave the visitors three points. Serunkuma got the goal for Express after a goalless first half. On 28 October 2017, Ondu and Vipers played out a goalless draw in Arua. Leku was ineligible to play because he was on loan from Vipers, Toha had a groin injury he picked from the Express game while Agau had a toe injury but Gasper was returning. The goalless draw nevertheless took Ondu back to the summit by a one-point difference until 31 October when Police beat hosts UPDF in Bombo by 1–0. On 3 November, Ondu drew 0–0 with BUL FC in Jinja.

On 7 November 2017, a jubilant Mbarara held Ondu to a 0–0 draw in Arua, their second goalless draw in a week. On 18 November 2017, Ondu beat Kirinya Jinja SS 1–0 in Arua courtesy of a penalty converted by goalkeeper Sebwato placing them one point behind table leaders Police FC but in 4th tied with KCCA and Villa on 19 points. Beginning the day in 5th place, Karim Bida's comeback brace gave Ondu a 2–1 victory over UPDF in Arua on 28 November 2017 at a time when Caterpillar goalkeeper Nicholas Sebwato (nicknamed Mr. Safe Hands) had been summoned for national duty ahead of the CECAFA Challenge Cup. This game marked the middle of the season.

Ondu's second half-end of the season began on 19 December 2017 with a 2–1 loss to Masavu FC. Okhuti got the consolation goal by netting a penalty in the 90th minute. On 22 December 2017, they beat URA 1–0 courtesy of a Viane goal at Mandela National Stadium.

On 27 January 2018, FUFA awarded Onduparaka a walkover into the 2018 Uganda Cup round of 32 after opponents Light S.S. did not appear.

Onduparaka drew 0–0 with Express on 10 February 2018. The following Tuesday, they were beaten 2–0 by Vipers in Kajjansi before losing 3–2 to 10-man Soana in the Stanbic Uganda Cup.

On 20 February 2018, Ondu beat BUL FC 1–0 in Arua courtesy of former Express player Yafesi Mubiru's first goal for the Caterpillars. Ondu visited Kyabazinga Stadium on 3 March 2018 but trailed Jinja Kirinya SS at halftime. The goal was scored by former Caterpillar Fred Adaku. On 10 March 2018, the first time Onduparaka FC lost at home in the Uganda Premier League, beaten 0–1 by SC Villa. Ondu remained with 29 points after 20 games and in 6th place.

The following week after criticism from fans, Head Coach Livingstone Mbabazi parted ways with Onduparaka FC. In a public statement, the team management reported that they asked Livingstone "to step aside with immediate effect from (the) UPL Matchday 21 Clash with UPDF (14 March 2018) until further notice."

In his absence, the technical bench comprising Leo Adraa, Simeon Masaba, Moses Oloya, Morris Adiga and Ramathan Musema took care of the team. Ondu drew 0–0 in Bombo after a goal was cancelled, penalty denied and woodwork hit in the last minutes. On 30 March 2018, two first half goals by Viane and a second half goal by Okhuti gave Onduparaka a 3–0 victory over Masavu FC.

It was the first three-goal margin home win for the Caterpillars in the Uganda Premier League. A 40th-minute goal on 4 April 2018 from Viane Sekajugo gave Ondu a 1–0 win at Proline FC's Startimes Stadium Lugogo, Kampala. OFC hosted Maroons on 9 April 2018 in Arua, but the game remained locked at 0–0. On 17 April 2018, Ondu hosted defending champions KCCA FC who took their starman Muhammad Shaban. He scored in the first half but Viane equalised for the hosts after the restart; game ended 1–1.

At Nambole on 27 April, OFC beat the Law Keepers 5–0 with two goals from Viane in the first half (30', 40'), Moses Ndawula (62'), Hassan Muhammod - Mudu (64') and Ezra Bida (83'). Ondu ended the day in 4th place (but having played one game more) with 41 points, 11 points behind the table leaders SC Villa, nine behind KCCA and seven from Vipers with four games left. Ondu faced URA FC on 2 May 2018 but drew 0–0.

Two days later, a 94th-minute lone goal by Jamal Malish gifted the Caterpillars victory over hosts Soana. On 9 May, they visited Mbarara FC. The game was lost to a penalty for the hosts. In the final game of the season on 25 May 2018, Ondu beat their visitors Bright Stars 2–0 with a first half goal from Caesar Okhuti and second half strike from Ezra Bilda. OFC remained 4th, one place better than their first season in the top flight.

=== 2018–19 season ===
To start the offseason, Onduparaka FC and KCCA FC played a two-legged friendly charity matchup to support palliative care in Arua, Onduparaka winning the first leg 3–1 in Lugogo on 30 June 2018. The Charity Walk to Greenlight for Hospice Arua was on 14 July 2018. That same month, KCCA's double-winning captain Denis Okot Oola joined Onduparaka on a two-year deal among half a dozen new players including Abel Eturude from SC Villa plus the pacy winger Nicholas Kagaba from URA FC. New Onduparaka coach Asaph Mwebaze led his side to the first FUFA Super 8 Final sponsored by Pilsner featuring the Top 8 Teams from the Uganda Premier League. Onduparaka drew 1–1 in the semifinals with SC Villa but knocked out the Jogoos 5–4 on penalties.

Though they lost 2–0 to KCCA in the finals on 25 August 2018, Ondu walked away with a 5 Million UgX cash prize, half of what the winners got. Ondu lost 1–0 at Soana in a friendly on 5 September 2018. On 22 September 2018, Ondu hosted Wakiso Giants in a friendly six days before the UPL season started. A fundraising drive was started by fans to purchase a bus for the team.

On the Opening Day of the 2019 UPL Season, a 28th-minute header by Viane Sekajugo plus a 78th-minute penalty by Sebwato gave Onduparaka three points in Arua against Mbarara-based debutants Nyamityobora FC. A lone goal by Rashid Toha gave Ondu a 1–0 away win at Nambole against SC Villa on 3 October 2018. Match Day 3 goals from Allan Okello (eighth minute) and Timothy Awany (64th minute) saw KCCA FC beat their hosts Onduparaka 2–0 on 19 October 2018. At the Mighty Arena Jinja on 23 October 2018, Caesar Okhuti scored the first goal (25th minute) for Onduparaka in a 3–0 win over Kirinya Jinja SS.

Despite getting a yellow card, the Most Valuable Player of the inaugural 2018 FUFA Drum (scored tournament-winning equaliser for Buganda against West Nile at Greenlight) and Pilsner Super 8 - Viane Sekajugo netted a hattrick by the 75th minute but Ondu's fourth goal was disallowed by the referee though given by the linesman. Viane's two legitimate goals were assisted by Okwalinga (34th minute) and Okhuti (65th minute). After the game, Coach Asaph said, "We could have scored even five." On 3 November, Ondu drew 0–0 with Tooro United (formerly called Soana FC since 2015 to 2018) at their new home - Buhinga Playground in Fort Portal (Kabarole District).

On 7 November, Ondu lost 2–1 at Maroons with a consolation goal delivered by Toha. Nevertheless, that same week, Asaph Mwebaze won the Coach of the Month accolade at the Real Stars Sports Monthly Awards. On 20 November 2018, Ondu beat Ndejje University 3–0 with goals from Denis Okot (19th minute), Gadafi Gadinho (67th) and Abel Eturude (76th). Nobody was booked in this game. A few hours before the Ndejje fixture, Asaph Mwebaze—barely four months into his tenure - resigned as Onduparaka coach citing maladministration, poor club structures, no record books, inefficiency plus intrigue as his reasons.

He announced his departure on NTV's Monday Night Pressbox (19 November 2018) and joined Nyamityobora FC. Mwebaze's assistant Simeon Masaba who was hired in January 2018 took charge. On 1 December, second half goals from Ezra Bida (50') and Pilsner Man of the Match Gadafi Gadinho (56') saw Ondu beat Express FC at Wankulukuku again. In their first ever West Nile Derby (8 December), Ondu rallied from a ninth minute Andrew Kidega opener for their opponents to earn maximum points.

An equaliser from Gadafi Gadinho (56') and winner by veteran striker Caser Okhuti seven minutes from fulltime ensured the bragging rights for the Caterpillars who share the same venue with UPL newcomers Paidha Black Angels. On 11 December, Ondu lost 1–0 to BUL FC in Jinja. Goals from Per Mertesacker and Okhuti gave Ondu a 2–1 victory over visitors Police on 16 December. On 28 December, a consolation away goal from Viane before halftime was followed by URA FC's third about three minutes after the restart to hand Ondu their fourth loss of the season.

Nevertheless, Onduparaka remained 3rd on the table two points ahead of their opponents who accumulated 20 points after their 3–1 victory. On 4 January 2019, Ondu drew 0–0 with their visitors who got two red cards. First was a straight red to Karim Ndugwa in the 63rd minute for a challenge on Viane while the Mbarara FC goalkeeper was sent off in additional time for headbutting Gadinho; it was his second bookable offence after also timewasting earlier. Ondu ended the first round of the season on 8 January by losing 3–0 at Vipers. In the Uganda Cup on 11 January, Solomon Okwalinga scored the lone goal at Kirinya Jinja SS in the fourth minute of additional time. It was his first goal for Onduparaka.

On 2 February 2019, Nelson Senkatuka scored for hosts Bright Stars FC in the 18th minute before Rashid Toha equalized for Ondu in the 55th minute. KCCA beat Ondu 1–0 on 5 February 2019. Four and seven days later respectively, Ondu drew 0–0 with Kirinya Jinja SS and URA FC in Arua. On 20 February 2019, hosts Mbarara City FC went ahead in the 19th minute from a corner with a Mukundani header but Toha leveled up with a header too in the 54th minute.

Then Okhuti netted the 77th-minute winner continuing the trend in which all Okhuti goals in the past two seasons were winners. Onduparaka also ended Mbarara's Unbeaten Home Run in this game. On 26 February 2019, a goalless draw with 2nd placed visitors Vipers meant Ondu finished the day in 6th place. On 2 March 2019, Ondu beat Maroons 2–1 to climb to 5th place.

On 5 March 2019, they visited Nyamityobora but lost 1–0. On 27 March 2019, goals from Gadafi and Okhuti gave Ondu a 2–1 victory over visitors SC Villa who pulled one goal back through Magwali. On 5 April 2019, Ondu lost 1–0 to their visitors Soana. On Matchday 26 (9 April 2019), Ondu lost 2–1 against Police for the first time and remained in 7th position.

On 20 April 2019, Ondu beat BUL 1–0. Four days later, they drew 1–1 at Paidha Black Angels. In May, Onduparaka FC signed a Football for Peace partnership with AVSI Foundation to help South Sudanese refugee communities especially in Omugo and Palabek Settlements. Their final game of the 2019 Startimes Uganda Premier League season against Express FC in Arua ended goalless. Onduparaka finished their campaign in 6th position, the club's worst since jumping to the top flight.

== 2019–20 season ==
Livingstone Mbabazi returned to Onduparaka in pre-season. On 4 August 2019, after a goalless draw with Tooro United in Arua, goals from Jamal Malish, Dudu Ramadhan, Amis Muwonge and Tabu Vitalis (also making a comeback) in the spotkicks plus a final save from Richard Anyama sent Ondu to the semifinals of the Pilsner Super 8 to face KCCA who knocked them out. On 7 November 2019, Ondu beat Kyetume 7–1 in Arua with two hattricks to register their biggest Premier League win and ended the day in 3rd place.

== Crest ==
Onduparaka's crest features three rings and a circle. The outer ring is green and the thinnest, the second is white while the third biggest is green and emblazoned with the name of the club in all caps at the top in white and motto ("The Struggle Continues") at the bottom, also in white. Between the club name and motto are two white stars that appear on the left and right centre of the big inner green ring. The rings encircle a white space (a few times avocado green) that contains a green caterpillar (hence the nickname) on the left feeding on a black stemmed plant with yellow fruits plus a black and white ball on its bottom right.

== Colours ==
Onduparaka's home colours in their first top flight season was all green while the away jersey was all white though sometimes there were mixtures including black and white. Keepers dressed in blue, black or yellow depending on the kits of outfield players.

== Stadium ==
Legally referred to as AbaBet Greenlight Stadium, Onduparaka's home ground also known as Paruku (Lugbara for "No escape") is found in Onduparaka village, less than a 10-minute ride north of Arua City and on the right side when you cut from the main road a few metres after the suburb's chief junction. Previously it was referred to as the Discovery Greenlight Arena. It has a chainlink fence separating fans from the playing field and also a perimeter fence and can accommodate 1,000 people. Advertising banners are attached to the fences. Some refer to it as The Valley of No Return because of Onduparaka's unbeaten run at home in their first season. Big teams like KCCA, Police and Express (all 2–1), Vipers (1–0) plus SC Villa (4–3) lost there.

== Sponsorship ==
AbaBet signed a partnership with Onduparaka FC in 2021 which requires the club to don their logo on their jerseys and the home ground is also renamed AbaBet Greenlight Stadium. MTN Uganda, which first announced a sponsorship deal for Onduparaka FC in October 2017, renewed their kit sponsorship deal with Onduparaka in February 2019.

== Junior Caterpillars ==
The next generation of Onduparaka FC stars are called Ondunyiri. In Lugbara, nyiri means little or small like children.

== Individual records ==
- First chairman: Benjamin Nyakuni
- First player to feature for Uganda Cranes: Caesar Okhuti
- First player to win Uganda Super League [now UPL]: Caesar Okhuti (with Bunamwaya [now Vipers], 2010)
- First player to win Cecafa: Caesar Okhuti
- First player to win FUFA MVP (Most Valuable Player) Award: Muhammad Shaban, 2016
- First player to feature in Africa Cup of Nations: Muhammad Shaban, Gabon 2017
- Leading Club goalscorer, all-time: Muhammad Shaban (in all competitions)
- Most goals by a Caterpillar in UPL: 13 for Muhammad Shaban (in 2017, Second Best Top Scorer)
- Uganda Cup Top Scorer: Muhammad Shaban (joint 7 goals), 2016

== Club records ==
- First league game: 0–0 against Soana (in 2016)
- First league loss at home: 0–1 against SC Villa, 10 March 2018
- First league win: 2–1 against KCCA, 9 September 2016
- First live broadcast league match on Azam TV: 1–0 against Kirinya Jinja SS, Uganda Premier League, 17 February 2017
- First international friendly: 2–0 against Gor Mahia, 4 February 2017
- First three-goal margin home win, 3–0 against Masavu FC, 30 March 2018
- Highest away win in UPL: 5–0 against Police FC at Nambole, April 2018
- Highest scoring in win: 16 goals v Muni FC (Division League)
- Highest UPL finish: 4th (in 2018)
- Lowest UPL finish: 6th (in 2019)
- Record league defeat: 7–0 against KCCA, 25 February 2017
- Record time unbeaten at home, four years between loss to Nebbi Central and SC Villa, one and a half UPL seasons too
- Runner-up: Uganda Cup, 2016
- Trophies: Regional League (1), 2016 which saw them promoted into the UPL
- Unbeaten at home in a whole UPL season, 2017 (only team)
