= Bright Stars FC =

Association football club in Uganda

Bright Stars
- Logo for Soltilo Bright Stars F.C
- Full name: Soltilo Bright Stars Football Club
- Founded: 1997; 29 years ago
- Ground: Kavumba Recreation Grounds; Wakiso, Wakiso District
- Capacity: 5,000
- Chairman: Terrence Rutashobya
- Manager: Herbert Mwebesa
- League: Ugandan Big League
- 2025–26: 5th
- Website: soltilobrightstars.co.ug
Home colours	Away colours

Bright Stars Football Club, also Soltilo Bright Stars, is a professional football club. They play in the top division of Ugandan football, the Ugandan Super League.

In September 2017, it was announced that Japan International Keisuke Honda, through his management company called Honda Estilo, bought a controlling interest in the club. Their motto is "Always Innovating, Never Imitating."

== History ==
Bright Stars was founded in 1997. They were promoted to the Uganda Super League after winning the FUFA Big League in 2012–13. John Kayanja was the coach who led the Stars to the Super League.

For their inaugural top flight season in 2013–14, Bright Stars turned to Livingstone Mbabazi to coach the team. Bright Stars flirted with relegation but finished in 12th place, two spots above the drop.

Bright Stars made the 2019 Uganda Cup final, their first ever finals appearance, but were defeated 5–4 on penalties by Proline FC after the game finished at a 1–1 draw. In 2024, the club roped in first ever Indian footballer in the country, Aaryan Badoni.

== Stadium ==
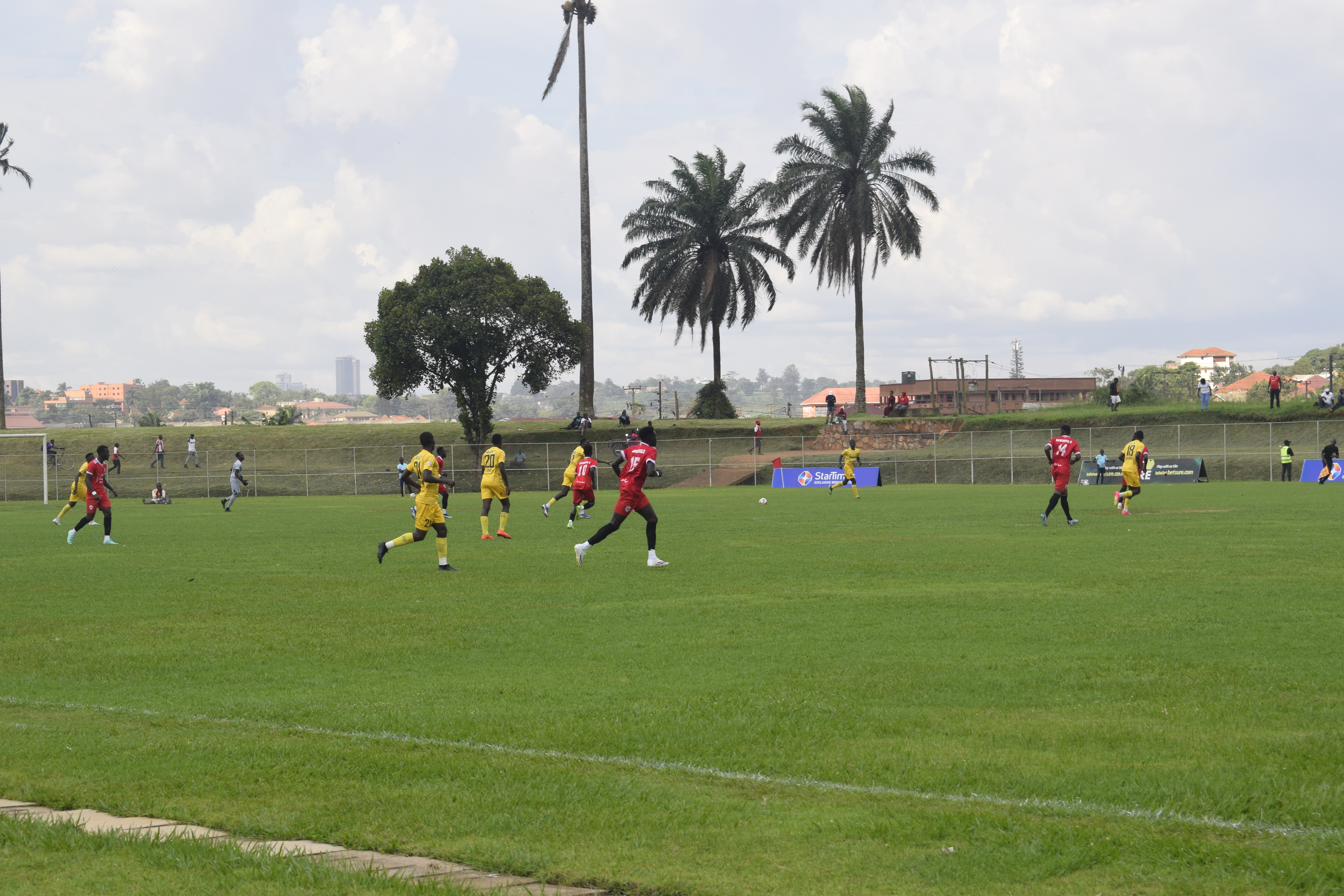
A Match between Bright Stars FC and Express FC at Mutesa II Stadium in Kampala, Uganda during the Uganda Premier League 2023.

In the 2014–15 season, the club moved to Mwererwe, in the Matugga neighborhood, north of Kampala, Uganda's capital and largest city. Previously, the team played at the 15,000 capacity Nakivubo Stadium.

== Current squad ==
This is the current squad of 2023. Note: Flags indicate national team as defined under FIFA eligibility rules; some limited exceptions apply. Players may hold more than one non-FIFA nationality.

No.	Pos.	Nation	Player
—	GK	UGA	Patrick Mubiru
—	GK	UGA	Hassan Matovu
—	GK	UGA	Shamulan Kamya
—	DF	UGA	Samuel Kato
—	MF	JPN	Yasuyuki Fujimoto
—	MF	UGA	Yasin Mugume
—	MF	UGA	Noordin Bunjo
—	MF	UGA	Ibrahim Kasinde
—	FW	UGA	Samuel Ssenyonjo
—	FW	UGA	Issa Bugembe
—	FW	UGA	Douglas Ochoko

== Non-playing staff ==
Corporate Hierarchy

Position Name

- Chairman: (Uganda) Ronnie Mutebi
- Board member: (Uganda) Ahmed Marsha Hussein
- Board member: (Uganda) Joseph Mubiru
- Board member: (Uganda) Tadeo Miiro

=== Technical team hierarchy ===
Position Name

- Head Coach: (Uganda) Joseph Harold Mutyaba
- Assistant Coach: (Uganda) Tom Ssali
- Team Doctor: (Uganda) Solomon Ndawula
- Team Statistician: (Uganda) Steven Lwanga
- Equipment Manager: (Uganda) Mustapha Kyakoonye

== Sponsorship History ==
- YOSHINO TRADING Ltd.

From 2018 to 2024, YOSHINO TRADING Ltd. was an official sponsor of Bright Stars FC. In 2018, the company served as the club’s chest sponsor for one season. Additionally, throughout the sponsorship period, YOSHINO TRADING Ltd. provided a wrapped team bus free of charge, supporting the team’s transportation needs.

== See also ==
- Express FC
- Kampala Capital City Authority FC
- SC Villa
- Uganda Revenue Authority SC
- Vipers SC
- BUL Jinja FC
- Busoga United FC
- Muteesa II Wankulukuku Stadium
- Ugandan Premier League
