= Tooro United F.C. =

Association football club in Uganda

Tooro United FC
- Full name: Tooro United Football Club
- Nicknames: The Roaring Lions, Entale Za Tooro, The Oranges
- Short name: Tooro United
- Founded: 2007
- Ground: Buhinga Stadium, Fort Portal
- Capacity: 5,000
- Owner: Mdm Alice Namatovu
- Chairman: Owek.Enganjani
- CEO: Rayyan S Hasheem
- League: Star Times Uganda Premier League
- 2020-2021: 16th

Tooro United Football Club is a Uganda based football club from Fort Portal currently playing in the top division of the Star Times Uganda Premier League.

== History ==
The club was established in 2007 initially as Soana F.C. and played at the Kavumba ground in Wakiso. The club was originally named after an investment firm.

Soana earned promotion to the Ugandan Super League in 2013.They quickly established themselves by winning their opening four matches of the season and ultimately securing a fifth place finish.

During the year 2018, the club's chairman who was from the Tooro region of Uganda, made up his mind and moved the team to Fort Portal.

Since then, Smart Obed sold the club to Mdm Alice Namatovu, who has guided the team from the Big League up to the Star Times Uganda Premier League. Under the new leadership, the club is transitioning from an amateur to a professional sports organization. Mdm President Alice Namatovu envisions transforming it into a genuine sporting club, comparable to those on the international stage.

== Stadium ==
The team currently plays at the 5000 capacity Buhinga playground in Fort Portal in the Western region of Uganda.

== League participations ==
- Ugandan Super League: 2013–2017
- Ugandan Second Division: 2007–2013
- Star Times Uganda Premier League: 2017–present
