= Mutesa II Stadium =

Stadium in Kampala, Uganda

Coordinates: 0.284°N 32.5483°E

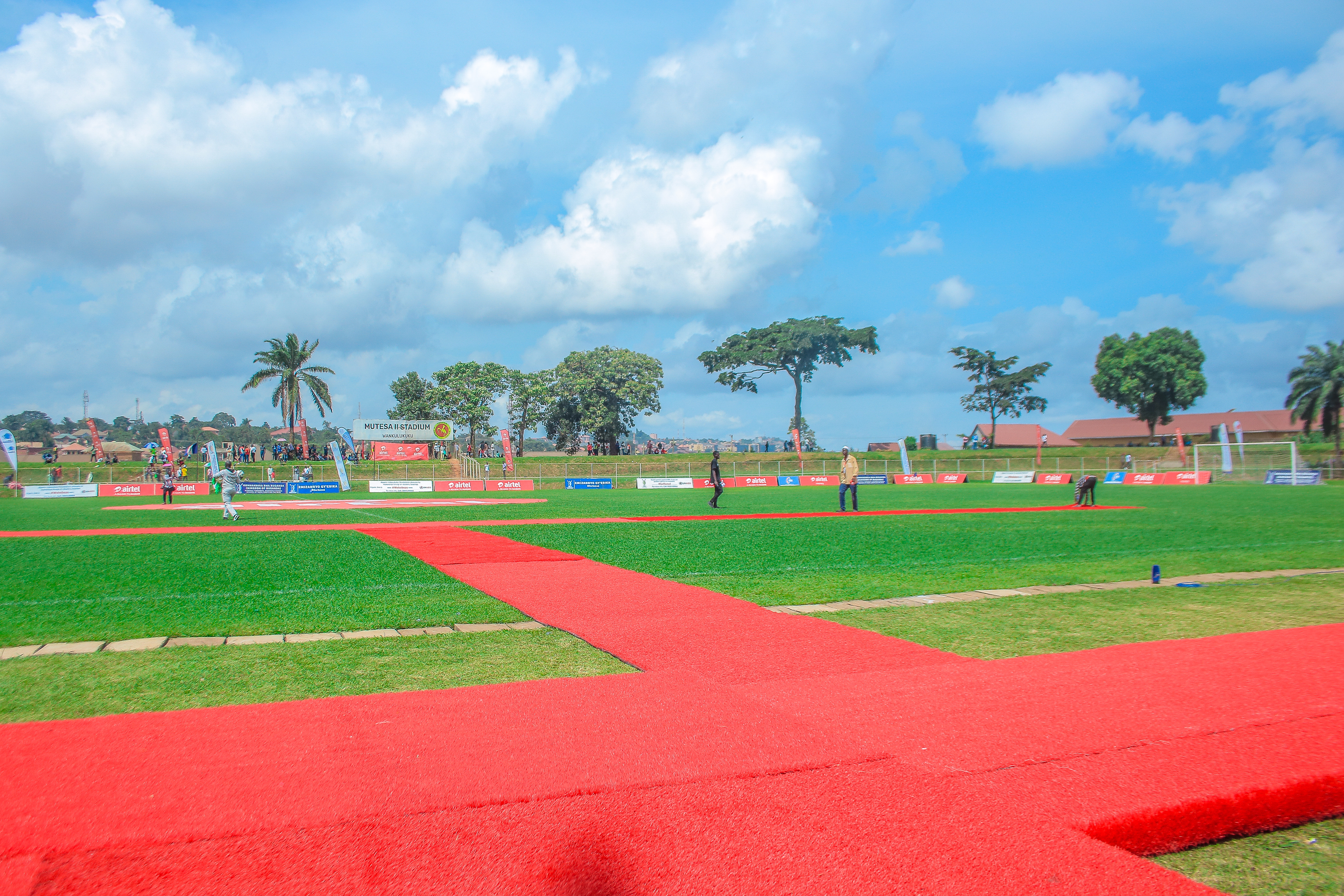
- Interactive map of Mutesa II Stadium
- Location: Kampala, Uganda
- Capacity: 8,000
- Field size: 115 yd × 74 yd (105 m × 68 m)

Construction
- Renovated: 2002, 2024–

Tenants
- Express FC (1991–2024);Entebbe Young FC

Mutesa II Stadium is a multi-purpose stadium in Kampala, Uganda. It is currently used mostly for football matches and serves as the home venue of Express FC of the Ugandan Super League. The stadium has a capacity of 8,000 people. It is named after Mutesa II of Buganda.

== See also ==
- List of African stadiums by capacity
- List of stadiums in Africa
