= Busoga United FC =

Association football club in Uganda

- Logo for Busoga United FC
- Full name: Busoga United Football Club
- Nickname: The Kingsmen
- Founded: 2012; 14 years ago as Kirinya–Jinja Senior Secondary School FC
- Ground: Kakindu Stadium
- Capacity: 20,000
- Coordinates: 00°28′01″N 33°14′13″E
- Chairman: Diana Hope Nyago
- Manager: Vincent Lukyamuzi
- Coach: Onen Peter
- League: Uganda Premier League
- 2023–24: 14th
- Website: https://busogautdfc.com/
colours	colours

Busoga United Football Club, also Busoga United FC, is a football team from the town of Jinja, Jinja District, in the Busoga sub-region, in the Eastern Region of Uganda, who currently play in the Uganda Premier League after their promotion, in the 2013/2014 season.

== History ==
Busoga United Football Club (BUFC) is a registered member of the Federation of Uganda Football Associations (FUFA), and a professional football club in the top flight league, the Startimes Uganda Premier League (SUPL), founded in 2012 as Kirinya-Jinja SSS.

Kirinya-Jinja SSS rebranded to Busoga United FC in 2019. The team is the most popular fan-based club in Busoga region, which comprises more than eight districts with over four million fans.

Busoga United FC has its offices at Kakindu Stadium in Jinja, and hosts its top flight home games at Kakindu Stadium, which has a capacity to seat a maximum of 45,000 fans.

== Records and statistics ==
No	Name	Year of Birth

== Players ==
The current squad is as of October 18, 2022.

=== Current squad ===
Note: Flags indicate national team as defined under FIFA eligibility rules; some limited exceptions apply. Players may hold more than one non-FIFA nationality.

No.	Pos.	Nation	Player
11	GK	UGA	Micheal Lutaaya
1	GK	UGA	Salim Munaku Wekiya
23	DF	UGA	Matata Jeremy
30	MD	UGA	Hussein Ssajjabbi (Double Licensed with Kyetume FC)
3	DF	UGA	Charles S. Mulanda
6	DF	UGA	Fredrick Ngalo
7	FW	UGA	Ronald Kasamba
22	MD	UGA	Isaac Doka Mweru
5	DF	UGA	Isaac Isinde (Captain)
19	FW	UGA	Bashamu Mugwa
27	FW	UGA	Moses Logono (Double licensed with Kyetume)
29	FW	UGA	Fred Massa (Double licensed with Kyetume)
16	MD	UGA	Kenneth Elvis Kibbale
8	MD	UGA	Simon O. Ngore
21	MD	UGA	Musa Kasimba
14	FW	UGA	Edrine C. Mawerere
28	DF	UGA	Dhafa George

No.	Pos.	Nation	Player
17	MD	UGA	Sharifu Ziraba
4	DF	UGA	Aggrey Madoi
10	FW	UGA	Joshua E. Ssentambule
18	MD	UGA	Hamdan Nsubuga
26	DF	UGA	Stephen Odongo (Double licensed with Kyetume)
25	FW	UGA	Allan Galandhi
15	MD	UGA	Ibrahim Kayiwa
20	FW	UGA	Emmanuel Ajo

== Management ==
=== Technical team hierarchy ===
Position Name

- Chairman: (Uganda) Diana Hope Nyago
- CEO: (Uganda) Lule Derrick
- Head Coach/ Manager: (Uganda) Vincent Lukyamuzi
- Assistant Head Coach: (Uganda) Jalendo Jimmy
- Goal Keeping Coach: (Uganda) Bright Dhaira
- Fitness Coach : (Uganda) Ikoba Afani
- Team Doctor: (Uganda) Kulika Ivan
- Team Doctor: (Uganda) Kaluma Racheal
- Physiotherapist: (Uganda) Ongei Daniel

== Stadium ==
The team uses Kakindu Stadium that has a seating capacity of 4,500 and this is shared with multiple clubs with in the Busoga Region such as Bul FC, Jinja Municipal Council Football Club.

== See also ==
- Bright Stars FC
- Express FC
- SC Villa
