= BUL Jinja FC =

Association football club in Uganda

- Full name: BIDCO Uganda Limited Jinja Football Club
- Nickname: The Jinja Bulls
- Short name: BUL
- Founded: January 1, 2007; 19 years ago
- Ground: Kyabazinga Stadium Bugembe; Jinja
- Capacity: 1,000
- Director: Suvrajit Ghosh, Rajagopal S.
- Manager: Travis Mulyanti
- League: Uganda Premier League
- 2025–26: 9th
- Website: https://bulfc.co.ug/
Home colours	Away colours

BIDCO Uganda Limited Jinja Football Club, also BUL Jinja FC, is a Ugandan football club from Jinja, in the Eastern Region of the country. The club is owned by the Jinja-based BIDCO Uganda Limited. They play in the top tier division of Ugandan football, the Uganda Premier League and play there home games at FUFA Technical Centre in Njeru.

== History ==
The club was founded in 2006-2007 as Bidco Co. departmental competitions with an intent of corporate social responsibility to market and promote Bidco Products, through which they developed the idea of joining Fufa associated leagues.

The team played in the FUFA Super League for the first time in 2011 and finished thirteenth out of sixteen teams in the league that season.

== Achievements ==
- Bul FC won the 2007-2008 Jinja division one league title.
- The BUL FC Junior Team crowned champions of the FUFA Juniors League in the 2018 - 2019 season.
- Bul FC defeated Vipers Soccer club to win the Stanbic Uganda cup edition of 2021 - 2022
- The club had a first appearance in a CAF competition: making their debut in the 2022 CAF confederations cup Preliminary round with Future FC of Egypt.

== Management ==
Initial club management was spearheaded by football fanatic Rupesh and Rao Kodey then company treasurer and managing director respectively. The current administration is composed of the club's directors Sankha Chatterjee and Leo Deng Hao, chairperson Ronald Barente, Vice Chairman Martin Ocitti, Club CEO Joseph Mutaka and the team manager Alex Isabirye.

== Stadium ==
Currently the team plays at the 1,000 capacity Kakindu Municipal Stadium, which they share with another football club, Jinja Municipal Council Football Club.

== Coaches ==
The head coach in the 2020/2021 Uganda Premier League season is Arthur Kyesimira, at one time a left winger with the Uganda national football team, the Uganda Cranes. The other team coaches include Peter Onen (assistant coach), David Kiwanuka (coach), and Bright Dhaira (goalkeeping coach).

== Competitions ==
- BUL FC participated in the 2022 CAF confederations cup Preliminary round, losing to Future FC of Egypt.
- The club is currently taking part in the 2022–2023 Uganda Premier League.
