= 1982 Uganda Cup =

Tournament details
- Country: Uganda

Final positions
- Champions: Kampala City Council FC
- Runners-up: Nile Breweries FC

The 1982 Uganda Cup was the eighth season of the main Ugandan football Cup.

== Overview ==
The competition has also been known as the Kakungulu Cup and was won by Kampala City Council FC who were awarded the tie after Nile Breweries FC left the field of play after 75 minutes. KCC were leading Nile 1-0 when the final was abandoned. The Nile players walked off the pitch in protest to a foul committed by KCC's John Latigo on Moses Musoke. The Nile players wanted the referee to send off Latigo, but the referee gave Latigo a caution. This annoyed Nile players and they walked off the pitch leaving KCC to be awarded the trophy. The results are not available for the earlier rounds

== Final ==
Tie no	Team 1	Score	Team 2	
1	Kampala City Council FC	1–0 abandoned	Nile Breweries FC	Nile walked off in the 75th minute at 1–0. KCC were awarded the match.

== See also ==
- 2000 Uganda Cup
- 2001 Uganda Cup
- 2013–14 Uganda Cup
- 2017 Uganda Cup
- 2018 Uganda Cup
