= 1991 Uganda Cup =

Tournament details
- Country: Uganda

Final positions
- Champions: Express Red Eagles
- Runners-up: Nile Breweries FC

The 1991 Uganda Cup was the 17th season of the main Ugandan football Cup . It was won by Express Red Eagles FC, now commonly known as Express FC.

== Overview ==
The competition has also been known as the Kakungulu Cup, and was won by Express Red Eagles who beat Nile Breweries FC 4–1 in the final. The results are not available for the earlier rounds.

Express FC and Kampala Capital City Authority FC (KCCA FC) currently hold the joint record for the most Uganda Cup wins, with 10 titles each. SC Villa follows closely with 9 titles.

== Final ==
Tie no	Team 1	Score	Team 2
1	Express Red Eagles	4–1	Nile Breweries FC

== See also ==
- 2000 Uganda Cup
- 2001 Uganda Cup
- 2013–14 Uganda Cup
- 2017 Uganda Cup
- 2018 Uganda Cup
