= 1992 Uganda Cup =

Tournament details
- Country: Uganda

Final positions
- Champions: Express Red Eagles
- Runners-up: Nile Breweries FC

1992 Uganda Cup was the 18th season of the main Ugandan football Cup.

== Overview ==
The competition was known as the Kakungulu Cup and was won by Express Red Eagles who beat Nile Breweries FC 1-0 in the final. The results are not available for the earlier rounds

== Final ==
Tie no	Team 1	Score	Team 2
1	Express Red Eagles	1–0	Nile Breweries FC

== See also ==
- 2000 Uganda Cup
- 2001 Uganda Cup
- 2013–14 Uganda Cup
- 2017 Uganda Cup
- 2018 Uganda Cup
