= 1987 Uganda Cup =

Tournament details
- Country: Uganda

Final positions
- Champions: Kampala City Council FC
- Runners-up: SC Villa

The 1987 Uganda Cup was the 13th season of the main Ugandan football Cup.

== Overview ==
The competition has also been known as the Kakungulu Cup and was won by Kampala City Council FC who beat SC Villa 1–0 in the final. The results are not available for the earlier rounds

== Semi-finals ==
Tie no	Team 1	Score	Team 2	
1	SC Villa	3–1	Express Red Eagles	Unknown
2	Kampala City Council FC	1–0	Uganda Airlines FC	Unknown

== Final ==
Tie no	Team 1	Score	Team 2
1	Kampala City Council FC	1–0	SC Villa

== See also ==
- 2000 Uganda Cup
- 2001 Uganda Cup
- 2013–14 Uganda Cup
- 2017 Uganda Cup
- 2018 Uganda Cup
