= 1989 Uganda Cup =

Tournament details
- Country: Uganda

Final positions
- Champions: SC Villa
- Runners-up: Express Red Eagles

1989 Uganda Cup was the 15th season of the main Ugandan football Cup. The tournament was also known as Kakungulu Cup, and it is currently called the Standbic Uganda Cup. This edition was won by SC Villa. This victory completed a domestic double for SC Villa, who also won the 1989 Uganda Super League title.

== Overview ==
The competition has also been known as the Kakungulu Cup. It was won by SC Villa, who beat Express Red Eagles 4–2 in the final. The results are not available for the earlier rounds.

=== Recent trends ===
- SC Villa was in a period of dominance during this time, winning both the league and cup titles in 1988 and 1989 under British coach Geoff Hudson.
- The Uganda Cup is also known as the Kakungulu Cup.
- Other notable winners around that time include KCC FC and Express FC, who regularly contested the final with SC Villa in the late 80s and early 90s.

== Final ==
Tie no	Team 1	Score	Team 2
1	SC Villa	4–2	Express Red Eagles

== See also ==
- 2000 Uganda Cup
- 2001 Uganda Cup
- 2013–14 Uganda Cup
- 2017 Uganda Cup
- 2018 Uganda Cup
- SC Villa
- Express FC
