= 1988 Uganda Cup =

Tournament details
- Country: Uganda

Final positions
- Champions: SC Villa
- Runners-up: Express Red Eagles

The 1988 Uganda Cup was the 14th season of the main Ugandan football Cup.

== Overview ==
The competition has also been known as the Kakungulu Cup and was won by SC Villa who beat Express Red Eagles 3–1 in the final. The results are not available for the earlier rounds

== Final ==
Tie no	Team 1	Score	Team 2
1	SC Villa	3–1	Express Red Eagles

== See also ==
- 2000 Uganda Cup
- 2001 Uganda Cup
- 2013–14 Uganda Cup
- 2017 Uganda Cup
- 2018 Uganda Cup
