= 1978 Uganda Cup =

Tournament details
- Country: Uganda

Final positions
- Champions: Nsambya Old Timers FC
- Runners-up: Uganda Commercial Bank FC

1978 Uganda Cup was the fourth season of the main Ugandan football Cup also known as the Kakungulu Cup and it is currently called standbic Uganda Cup. It was won by Nsambya Old Tiomers FC who defeated Uganda Commercial Bank FC UCB 1-0.

== Overview ==
The competition has also been known as the Kakungulu Cup and was won by Nsambya Old Timers FC who beat Uganda Commercial Bank FC (UCB) 1-0 in the final. The results are not available for the earlier rounds.

== Final ==
The 1978 Uganda Cup final was contested by Nsambya Old Timers FC and Uganda Commercial Bank FC (UCB), with Nsambya Old Timers FC winning the game 1-0 against Uganda Commercial Bank FC (UCB).

Tie no	Team 1	Score	Team 2
1	Nsambya Old Timers FC	1-0	Uganda Commercial Bank FC

== See also ==
- 2000 Uganda Cup
- 2001 Uganda Cup
- 2013–14 Uganda Cup
- 2017 Uganda Cup
- 2018 Uganda Cup
