= 1995 Uganda Cup =

Tournament details
- Country: Uganda

Final positions
- Champions: Express Red Eagles
- Runners-up: Posta FC

The 1995 Uganda Cup was the 21st season of the main Ugandan football cup. The 1995 cup was won by Express FC, who achieved a league and cup double in 1995, winning both the Uganda Cup and the Uganda Super League title that season.

The Uganda Cup has also been known as the Kakungulu Cup, and is currently called the Standbic Uganda Cup.

== Overview ==
The competition was won by Express Red Eagles, who beat Posta FC 2–0 in the final after extra time. The results are not available for the earlier rounds.

== Final ==
Tie no	Team 1	Score	Team 2
1	Express Red Eagles	2–0 (aet)	Posta FC

== See also ==
- 2000 Uganda Cup
- 2001 Uganda Cup
- 2013–14 Uganda Cup
- 2017 Uganda Cup
- 2018 Uganda Cup
- Express FC
