= 1993 Uganda Cup =

Tournament details
- Country: Uganda

Final positions
- Champions: Kampala City Council FC
- Runners-up: Dairy Heroes FC

1993 Uganda Cup was the 19th season of the main Ugandan football Cup. The tournament was also known as kakungulu Cup currently called Standbic Uganda Cup. This edition was won by Kampala City Council FC also known as KCC FC.

== Overview ==
The competition was known as the Kakungulu Cup and was won by Kampala City Council FC who beat Dairy Heroes FC 2-1 in the final. The results are not available for the earlier rounds

== Final ==
Tie no	Team 1	Score	Team 2
1	Kampala City Council FC	2–1	Dairy Heroes FC

== See also ==
- 2000 Uganda Cup
- 2001 Uganda Cup
- 2013–14 Uganda Cup
- 2017 Uganda Cup
- 2018 Uganda Cup
