= 1985 Uganda Cup =

Tournament details
- Country: Uganda

Final positions
- Champions: Express Red Eagles
- Runners-up: Kampala City Council FC

1985 Uganda Cup was the 11th season of the main Ugandan football Cup.

== Overview ==
The competition has also been known as the Kakungulu Cup and was won by Express Red Eagles who beat Kampala City Council FC 3–1 in the final. The results are not available for the earlier rounds. The final took place at the Nakivubo stadium.

Express' goals were scored by Joachim Matovu, Phillip Musoke, and Jimmy Muguwa, while Charles Masiko scored KCC's lone goal. The final was highly anticipated, as KCC had just edged Express to win the 1985 Uganda Super League title on goal difference. Express' victory in the Cup final served as a consolation for losing the league title.

== Final ==
Express FC won the 1985 Uganda Cup, defeating Kampala Capital City Council FC (KCCA FC) 3–1 in the final at Nakivubo stadium.

Tie no	Team 1	Score	Team 2
1	Express Red Eagles	3–1	Kampala City Council FC

== See also ==
- 2000 Uganda Cup
- 2001 Uganda Cup
- 2013–14 Uganda Cup
- 2017 Uganda Cup
- 2018 Uganda Cup
