= 1979 Uganda Cup =

Football competition

Tournament details
- Country: Uganda

Final positions
- Champions: Kampala City Council FC
- Runners-up: Uganda Commercial Bank FC

1979 Uganda Cup was the fifth season of the main Ugandan football Cup.

== Overview ==
The competition has also been known as the Kakungulu Cup and was won by Kampala City Council FC who were awarded a walkover for their match against Uganda Commercial Bank FC in the final. The results are not available for the earlier rounds

== Final ==
Tie no	Team 1	Score	Team 2
1	Kampala City Council FC	w/o	Uganda Commercial Bank FC

== See also ==
- 2000 Uganda Cup
- 2001 Uganda Cup
- 2013–14 Uganda Cup
- 2017 Uganda Cup
- 2018 Uganda Cup
