= 1980 Uganda Cup =

Tournament details
- Country: Uganda

Final positions
- Champions: Kampala City Council FC
- Runners-up: Maroons FC

1980 Uganda Cup was the sixth season of the main Ugandan Cup football. KCC FC emerged as the winners in the final. The tournament can also be termed as Kakungulu Cup and it is called Standbic Uganda Cup. KCC FC eventually changed its name to KCCA FC in August 2015. This was brought up by an administrative rebranding of the parent body, from Kampala City Council (KCC) to Kampala Capital City Authority (KCCA) in 2011.

== Overview ==
The competition has also been known as the Kakungulu Cup and was won by Kampala City Council FC who defeated Maroons FC 2–0 in the final. The results are not available for the earlier rounds. This was KCC FC's second consecutive Uganda Cup title. KCC FC's victorious coach was Moses Nsereko, who led the team to a four cup triumphs in his career. In the 1980 Uganda National League, a separate competition, the Nile Breweries were the champions while KCC FC finished in the third place.

== Final ==
Tie no	Team 1	Score	Team 2
1	Kampala City Council FC	2–0	Maroons FC

== See also ==
- 2000 Uganda Cup
- 2001 Uganda Cup
- 2013–14 Uganda Cup
- 2017 Uganda Cup
- 2018 Uganda Cup
- KCCA FC
