= 1986 Uganda Cup =

Tournament details
- Country: Uganda

Final positions
- Champions: SC Villa
- Runners-up: Tobacco FC

The 1986 Uganda Cup was the 12th season of the main Ugandan football cup.

== Overview ==
The competition has also been known as the Kakungulu Cup and was won by SC Villa who beat Tobacco FC 2–0 in the final. The results are not available for the earlier rounds. The final was played at Nakivubo stadium. The victory secured SC Villa first domestic league and cup double for the first time in their history. The goals in the final by SC Villa were scored by Sula Kato and Twaha Kivumbi.

== Final ==
Tie no	Team 1	Score	Team 2
1	SC Villa	2–0	Tobacco FC

== See also ==
- 2000 Uganda Cup
- 2001 Uganda Cup
- 2013–14 Uganda Cup
- 2017 Uganda Cup
- 2018 Uganda Cup
