= 1983 Uganda Cup =

Tournament details
- Country: Uganda

Final positions
- Champions: SC Villa
- Runners-up: Kampala City Council FC

1983 Uganda Cup was the ninth season of the main Ugandan football Cup.

== Overview ==
The competition has also been known as the Kakungulu Cup and was won by SC Villa who beat Kampala City Council FC 1–0 in the final. While results are not available for the earlier rounds, KCCA defeated Jinja's Tobacco FC, while SC Villa defeated Express to reach the final.

== Final ==
Tie no	Team 1	Score	Team 2
1	SC Villa	1–0	Kampala City Council FC

== See also ==
- 2000 Uganda Cup
- 2001 Uganda Cup
- 2013–14 Uganda Cup
- 2017 Uganda Cup
- 2018 Uganda Cup
