= 1999 Uganda Cup =

Tournament details
- Country: Uganda

Final positions
- Champions: Dairy Heroes FC
- Runners-up: Lyantonde FC

The Uganda Cup is the Uganda's main annual national football competition, organized by FUFA. It is played on a knock out basis. This annual competition is open for non league sides, registered clubs playing in all the five football divisions (Division I, II, III, Iv and V) FUFA. The 1999 Uganda Cup was the 25th season of the main Ugandan football Cup.

== Overview ==
The competition was known as the Kakungulu Cup and was won by Dairy Heroes FC also known as Mbale Heroes FC who defeated Lyantonde FC 3-0 on penalties in the final. The score was level at 0-0 at the end of extra time. The results are not available for the earlier rounds but it is known that Dairy Heroes eliminated SC Villa in the semi-finals.

== Final ==
The match was tied 0-0 after extra time, with Dairy Heroes winning the penalty shootout 3-0.

Tie no	Team 1	Score	Team 2	
1	Dairy Heroes FC	0–0 (aet) (p. 3–0)	Lyantonde FC	The final was played on 8 October 1999 at the Nakivubo Stadium.

== See also ==
- 1971 Uganda Cup
- 1976 Uganda Cup
- 1977 Uganda Cup
- 2017 Uganda Cup
- 2018 Uganda Cup
