= 1977 Uganda Cup =

Tournament details
- Country: Uganda

Final positions
- Champions: Simba FC
- Runners-up: Nytil FC

1977 Uganda Cup was the third season of the main Ugandan football Cup. It is currently called Standbic Uganda Cup, the name was changed in 2017 when it welcomed its new sponsor Standbic Bank.

The 1977 Uganda Cup was won by Simba FC defeating Nytil FC by a walkover in the final.

== Overview ==
The competition has also been known as the Kakungulu Cup and was won by Simba FC who were awarded a walkover after Nytil FC failed to appear for the final. At a time of the Idi Amin regime, the Army side, Simba FC, were eager to represent the country and forced the organisers to change the date of the final. Nytil learnt of the change via a radio-announcement and hence failed to show up. The results are not available for the earlier rounds

== Final ==
Tie no	Team 1	Score	Team 2
1	Simba FC	w/o	Nytil FC

== See also ==
- 2000 Uganda Cup
- 2001 Uganda Cup
- 2013–14 Uganda Cup
- 2017 Uganda Cup
- 2018 Uganda Cup
