= 1994 Uganda Cup =

Tournament details
- Country: Uganda

Final positions
- Champions: Express Red Eagles
- Runners-up: Kampala City Council FC

The 1994 Uganda Cup season was the 20th season of the main Ugandan football cup.

== Overview ==
The competition was known as the Kakungulu Cup and was won by Express Red Eagles who beat Kampala City Council FC 4–3 on penalties in the final. The results are not available for the earlier rounds

== Final ==
Tie no	Team 1	Score	Team 2
1	Express Red Eagles	0–0 (p. 4–3)	Kampala City Council FC

== See also ==
- 2000 Uganda Cup
- 2001 Uganda Cup
- 2013–14 Uganda Cup
- 2017 Uganda Cup
- 2018 Uganda Cup
