= 1990 Uganda Cup =

Tournament details
- Country: Uganda

Final positions
- Champions: Kampala City Council FC
- Runners-up: SC Villa

The 1990 Uganda Cup was the 16th season of the main Ugandan football Cup. KCC FC went into the match as the underdogs, but their victory extended their impressive record in the event, marking them as a six time winner of the Uganda Cup. SC Villa had won the league title in 1990 and was aiming for a "double" (winning both the league and cup competitions) for the third consecutive time, but KCC FC denied them.

== Overview ==
The competition has also been known as the Kakungulu Cup. It was won by Kampala City Council FC who defeated SC Villa 3–0 in the final. The results are not available for the earlier rounds.

The final match was played in Nakivubo Stadium on 10 October 1990. Goals in the final for KCC FC were scored by Masiko Charles, Issa Ssekatawa and Mayanja Joseph. SC Villa's Steven Bogere was sent off during the match after getting a red card in the match. The results for the earlier rounds of the tournament are not publicly available. SC Villa had won the league title in 1990.

== Final ==
Tie no	Team 1	Score	Team 2
1	Kampala City Council FC	3–0	SC Villa

== See also ==
- 2000 Uganda Cup
- 2001 Uganda Cup
- 2013–14 Uganda Cup
- 2017 Uganda Cup
- 2018 Uganda Cup
