= 1971 Uganda Cup =

Tournament details
- Country: Uganda

Final positions
- Champions: Coffee Kakira
- Runners-up: Simba FC

The 1971 Uganda Cup was the first edition of Uganda's premier knockout football tournament, and it was won by Coffee United FC. Coffee United SC defeated Simba FC (also known as the Army side) with a final score of 2–1.

== Overview ==
The competition has also been known as the Kakungulu Cup and was won by Coffee Kakira who beat Simba FC (the Army side) 2–1 in the final. The results are not available for the earlier rounds

It was initiated in 1971 by the Henry Balamaze Lwanga-led FUFA (Federation of Uganda Football Associations). The winner of the Uganda Cup earns a spot to represent the country in the CAF Confederation Cup (formerly the Africa Cup Winner's Cup).

Following the inaugural edition, the competition was suspended and not held again until 1976 due to civil unrest.

== Final ==
Coffee United SC emerged as the winners, defeating Simba FC with a final score of 2–1. This made them the first team to win the trophy in the tournament's history.

Tie no	Team 1	Score	Team 2
1	Coffee Kakira	2–1	Simba FC

== See also ==
- 2018 Uganda Cup
- 2013–14 Uganda Cup
- 2017 Uganda Cup
- 2000 Uganda Cup
- 2001 Uganda Cup
