= 1976 Uganda Cup =

Tournament details
- Country: Uganda

Final positions
- Champions: Gangama United FC
- Runners-up: Coffee United SC

1976 Uganda Cup (then known as the Kakungulu Cup) was the second season of the main Ugandan football Cup. It was won by Gangama United FC, who defeated Coffee United SC 4–2 on penalties after a 0–0 draw in normal play.

== Overview ==
The competition has also been known as the Kakungulu Cup named in the honour of Prince Badru Kakungulu (a former UFA vice president) and was won by Gangama United FC who beat Coffee United SC 4–2 on penalties in the final. The score was level at 0–0 at the end of normal play. The results are not available for the earlier rounds.

== Final ==
The match was a 0–0 draw after normal play, and Gangama United FC won the penalty shootout 4–2.This victory made the Mbale-based Gangama United FC the first upcountry team (outside the Kampala area) to win a major Ugandan football trophy.

Tie no	Team 1	Score	Team 2
1	Gangama United FC	0–0 (p. 4–2)	Coffee United SC

== See also ==
- 2000 Uganda Cup
- 2001 Uganda Cup
- 2013–14 Uganda Cup
- 2017 Uganda Cup
- 2018 Uganda Cup
