= Ayub Khalifa Kiyingi =

Ugandan football Coach and a former association football player

Personal information
- Full name: Ayub Khalifah Kiyingi
- Nationality: Ugandan
- Born: 4 June 1975 (age 51) Walukuba Village Jinja District
- Occupation: Coach

Sport
- Club: Kawempe Muslim LFC

Ayub Khalifa Kiyingi (born 4 June 1975) is a Ugandan football Coach and a former association football player who is the head coach for Kawempe Muslim Ladies FC and Kawempe Muslim Secondary school football team. He has lifted six trophies since the Uganda Women football topflight league was introduced in 2014/15.

== Early life ==
Ayub Khalifa Kiyingi was born on 4 June 1975 to Khalifa Kassim Ayub and Nakazimba Nalumansi Amina, the residents of Walukuba village in Jinja District. He is the fourth child in the family of four children on the mother's side. He got involved in football at the age of 10 years while at Walukuba West Primary School in Jinja District

In 1989, he joined Jinja secondary school. His father was the Manager of Nytil football club Jinja now a defunct club which was featuring in Uganda Men Super League.

== Personal life ==
Ayub is a professional teacher who teaches a subject called Technical Drawing. He joined Kawempe Muslim Secondary School in 1999 after attaining a diploma in Technological Studies from Institute of Teachers Education in Kyambogo.

He furthered his studies and in 2003, he graduated with a bachelor in Education in Technological Studies majoring in Technical Drawing from Kyambogo University.

Ayub Khalifa Kiyingi is a married man with two wives. Abil Khalifa, Haira Nabbosa, Twins Hakam Khalifa and Halim Khalifa, Ajmal Haam are among his children who play football.

== Career ==
=== Playing career ===
Ayub started is club football at WAMA Football club Jinja in 1991, in 1992 he joined UTODA FC Jinja a district level club, between 1993–95, Ayub was playing as a midfielder for Iganga FC. In 1995 he joined FUFA Big league football club, Kireka United FC where he spend four years before he got an injure that ended his playing career in 1999.

=== Managerial career ===
Ayub started his managerial career in 1999 after a forced retirement from football due to right leg fracture. He started his coaching career at Kawempe Muslim SS, the school he joined in 1999 as assistant games teacher, by then, he was only coaching boys football team.

In 2002, Ayub Khalifah started a girl's team at Kawempe Muslim SS but did not play in any major or national tournament until 2007 when they reached final and lost to Masaka SS 2-1 in the match played at Luweero Freedom Arena. Masaka SS goals were scored by Mary Nakawooza and Carol Nabwowe while the consolation for Kawempe Muslim was scored by Sauda Nakirya.

=== Club coaching career ===
In 2014 after the introduction of fufa women elite league, Ayub established Kawempe Muslim Lfc and it won the first trophy after beating Buikwe She Stars FC 3-2. Yudaya Nakayenze and Sandra Nabweteme scored the goals for Kawempe while Winnie Babirye and an own goal were for Buikwe. Since then, he has managed Kawempe Muslim todate and helped the side to win six topflight league trophies and CAF Women Champions League CECAFA Zonal qualifiers.

=== National teams coaching career ===
Ayub Khalifah was the first head coach of Teen Cranes (U17 women team) in 2019 and guided the team to 2019 COSAFA U17 Women gold medal. Ayub also guided the team to 2019 inaugural CECAFA U17 Women trophy. He was again trusted with the national team responsibility by FUFA in 2021 with the U20. In 2023 he guided U18 team and lost to Tanzania, Uganda finished us runners-up with 9 points. Ayub also entrusted with Crested Cranes as an interim head coach in 2023.

== Achievements ==
School championships

- Uganda Secondary Schools Sports Association Girls national championship trophies; 2010,2011,2013,2014,2015,2016,2019,2024
- Federation of East Africa Schools Association Girls football championship trophies; 2012,2017,2023

Club Trophies

- FUFA Women Elite League; 2015,2015/16,2016/2017,2017/18.
- FUFA Women Super League; 2023/24,2025/26.
- CAF Women Champions League CECAFA Zonal Qualifiers; 2026

National Teams

- COSAFA U-17; 2019
- CECAFA WOMEN U-17; 2019

== Honours ==
- Airtel FUFA Women Football coach of the year, 2019
- MTN FUFA Women Football coach of the year, 2024
- Fortebet Real Stars Achievement Award, 2026
- FUFA Women in Sport Symposium coach of the year, 2026

== See also ==
- David Otti
- Morley Byekwaso
- Baker Mbowa
