= Mbale Heroes FC =

Association football club in Uganda

Mbale Heroes
- Full name: Mbale Heroes Football Club
- Nickname: The Surgeons
- Founded: early 1970s
- Ground: Mbale City Stadium, Mbale, Uganda
- Capacity: 10,000 (approx.)
- Chairman: Peter Karugaba
- Manager: Baker Mbowa (as of January 2025)
- League: FUFA Big League
- 2024–25: 16th in UPL (relegated)
Home colours

Mbale Heroes Football Club is a Ugandan professional football club based in Mbale, Eastern Uganda. Founded in the early 1970s, the team is nicknamed The Surgeons and plays its home matches at the Mbale City Stadium. The club is one of the most historic sides from Eastern Uganda, twice winning the Ugandan Cup (1976, 1999).

== History ==
=== Early years (1970s–1980s) ===
The club traces its origins to the early 1970s under the name Gangama United. In 1976, they claimed their first major trophy, lifting the Kakungulu Cup (now Uganda Cup), which marked them as one of the top provincial clubs outside Kampala.

=== Rise to prominence (1990s) ===
In the 1990s, the club merged with Dairy Corporation to form Mbale Dairy Heroes, a merger that briefly stabilized finances and attracted top talent. They reached the 1993 Uganda Cup final and later won the trophy in 1999, defeating SC Villa in a famous upset.

The team was promoted to the Uganda Super League in 1994 and became a strong presence in the league throughout the decade.

=== Decline and relegation (2000s) ===
Mbale Heroes struggled financially in the early 2000s. Inconsistent management, loss of key players, and reduced sponsorship contributed to their relegation from the Uganda Super League in 2004. For nearly two decades, they played in lower divisions, occasionally challenging for promotion but failing to return to the top flight.

=== Revival and promotion (2020s) ===
In May 2024, the club finally secured promotion back to the Uganda Premier League after 19 years, defeating Onduparaka FC in a playoff and finishing third in the FUFA Big League.

Despite the excitement, their return season (2024–25) was difficult. With only 10 points in 26 matches, the club was relegated back to the FUFA Big League in April 2025.

== Stadium ==
The team hosts its matches at the Mbale City Stadium, which holds approximately 10,000 spectators. The stadium underwent renovations in 2024 to meet Uganda Premier League standards, including improved changing rooms and upgraded seating.

== Notable players ==
Several players who represented Mbale Heroes went on to feature for the Uganda national football team and other top clubs, including:

- Jackson Mayanja – Uganda Cranes legend, later a national team coach.
- Hassan Mubiru – prolific striker who also played for SC Villa and Express FC.
- Charles Masiko – former Cranes goalkeeper.

== Rivalries and fan culture ==
Mbale Heroes share a historic rivalry with Uganda’s Eastern clubs, especially Busia United Stars FC, Tororo United FC, and in some cases URA FC. Matches against Kampala-based clubs like SC Villa, Express FC, and KCCA FC have traditionally drawn large crowds due to Mbale Heroes’ passionate fan base.

The supporters are known locally as "The Surgeons’ Army", a nod to the club’s nickname.

== Honours ==
- Ugandan Cup / Kakungulu Cup
  - Winners (2): 1976, 1999
  - Runners-up (1): 1993

== Recent managers ==
- Abbey Kikomeko (until mid-2023)
- Asaph Mwebaze (2023–early 2025)
- Baker Mbowa (2025–present)

== See also ==
- Uganda Premier League
- FUFA Big League
- Ugandan Cup
