= 1998 Uganda Cup =

Tournament details
- Country: Uganda

Final positions
- Champions: SC Villa
- Runners-up: SC Simba

1998 Uganda Cup was the 24th season of the main Ugandan football Cup.

== Overview ==
The competition was known as the Kakungulu Cup and was won by SC Villa who beat SC Simba 2-0 in the final. Hassan Mubiru scored a brace for SC Villa dribbling past Fred Kajoba the Express keeper on two occasions and finishing clinically.

== Quarter-finals ==
The 4 matches in this round were played between 7 October and 10 October 1998.

Tie no	Home team	Score	Away team
1	SC Simba	2–2 (p. 4–2)	SCOUL FC
2	SC Villa	4–0	Police FC
3	Express Red Eagles	beat	Umeme FC
4	Kampala City Council FC	1-0	Iganga Town Council FC

== Semi-finals ==
The semi-finals were played on 15 September 1998.

Tie no	Team 1	Score	Team 2
1	SC Villa	2–0	Express Red Eagles
2	SC Simba	2–0	Kampala City Council FC

== Final ==
Tie no	Team 1	Score	Team 2	
1	SC Villa	2–0	SC Simba	Scorer for SC Villa: Hassan Mubiru (2)
