= 1996 Uganda Cup =

Tournament details
- Country: Uganda

Final positions
- Champions: Uganda Electricity Board FC
- Runners-up: Nile Breweries FC

1996 Uganda Cup was the 22nd season of the main Ugandan football Cup.

== Overview ==
The competition was known as the Kakungulu Cup and concluded on 2 November 1996 at Jinja where Uganda Electricity Board FC beat Nile Breweries FC 1-0 in the final.

== Quarter-finals ==
The 4 matches in this round were played between 7 October and 21 October 1996.

| Tie no | Home team | Score | Away team | |
|---|---|---|---|---|
| 1 | Express FC | 2–0 | Mbale Dairy Heroes FC | 7 October 1996 |
| 2 | Police FC | 1–2 | Nile Breweries FC | 10 October 1996 |
| 3 | SC Villa | 0–0 (p. 2–3) | Kampala City Council FC | 17 October 1996 |
| 4 | Uganda Electricity Board FC | 2-0 | Villa International FC | 21 October 1996 |

== Semi-finals ==
The semi-finals were played on 23 and 24 October 19961.

| Tie no | Home team | Score | Away team | |
|---|---|---|---|---|
| 1 | Express FC | 0–0 (p. 2–3) | Uganda Electricity Board FC | 23 October 1996 |
| 2 | Kampala City Council FC | 0–0 (p. 3–4) | Nile Breweries FC | 24 October 1996 |

== Final ==
The final was played on 2 November 1996 at Jinja.

| Tie no | Team 1 | Score | Team 2 | |
|---|---|---|---|---|
| 1 | Uganda Electricity Board FC | 1–0 | Nile Breweries FC | 2 November 1996 |

== See also ==
- Uganda Cup
