= 2002 Uganda Super League =

Football season in Uganda

Uganda Super League
- Season: 2002
- Champions: SC Villa
- Top goalscorer: Hassan Mubiru, Express FC (22)

The 2002 Ugandan Super League was the 35th season of the official Ugandan football championship, the top-level football league of Uganda.

== Overview ==
The 2002 Uganda Super League was contested by 15 teams and was won by SC Villa, while SCOUL, Maji FC, Nile FC/Military Police, Arua Garage and Kasese Town Council FC were relegated.

== League standings ==
Pos	Team	Pld	W	D	L	GF	GA	GD	Pts	Qualification or relegation
1	SC Villa (C)	28	26	1	1	62	9	+53	79	Champions
2	Express FC	28	21	3	4	62	20	+42	66	
3	Kampala City Council FC	28	20	4	4	47	20	+27	64	
4	Lyantonde/URA	28	11	13	4	28	20	+8	46	
5	Police FC	28	11	11	6	34	25	+9	44	
6	SC Simba	28	13	4	11	33	26	+7	43	
7	Masaka Local Council FC	28	10	11	7	30	21	+9	41	
8	Iganga Town Council FC	28	8	9	11	24	32	−8	33	
9	Mbale Heroes	28	8	9	11	25	34	−9	33	
10	Mbarara United FC	28	9	5	14	30	46	−16	32	
11	SCOUL (R)	28	6	7	15	21	39	−18	25	Relegated
12	Maji FC (R)	28	7	2	19	25	53	−28	23	Relegated
13	Nile FC/Military Police (R)	28	6	4	18	26	43	−17	22	Relegated
14	Arua Garage (R)	28	5	5	18	26	48	−22	20	Relegated
15	Kasese Town Council FC (R)	28	1	6	21	14	53	−39	9	Relegated

(C) Champions; (R) Relegated

== Leading goalscorer ==
The top goalscorer in the 2002 season was Hassan Mubiru of Express FC with 22 goals.
