= Ramz Kawooya =

Ugandan footballer (born 1999)

Personal information
- Date of birth: 27 January 1999 (age 27)
- Place of birth: Bugiri
- Height: 1.82 m (6 ft 0 in)
- Position: Central midfielder

Team information
- Current team: Express FC
- Number: 14

Youth career
- Years: Team
- 2014–2016: Kataka FC Academy
- 2016–2022: Kataka FC
Total		12	(0)

Ramz Kawooya (born 27 January 1999) is a Ugandan professional footballer who plays as a center midfielder for Uganda Premier League club Express FC.

== Early life ==
At a young age, Ramz Kawooya emerged as the best player of a football tournament in the U10 player level organized by a regional division counsellor in a tournament aimed at scouting young talents.

== Club career ==
In January 2014, Ramz joined an academy team of Kataka United FC playing in the lower division regional league in Eastern Uganda where he joined as a center midfielder playing in the U17 level. Ramz won different football awards which impressed the club management board and upgraded him to the first team squad lineup.

He made his debut match as a professional midfielder for Kataka United FC on a match against Bugiri United FC in 2016 at the age of 17 years. He later signed a 6 year long-term contract with his Kataka United team playing as a first team player in a role of Central midfielder. Ramz played 254 games as a starter and 22 games as a substitute, he scored 28 goals for Kataka United FC and made 45 assists in his time at the club. At the end of his contract with his childhood club, Ramz did not renew his contract with Kataka United FC as he wanted to explore other clubs and advance his talent in other leagues as a center midfielder.

In January 2023, Ramz Kawooya joined Express FC a football club playing in the Uganda Premier League. Ramz joined as a center midfielder and made his debut match playing against Busoga United FC coming in as a substitute at Mutesa II Stadium in Wankulukuku the home of Express FC.

Ramz played his next match in a Kampala derby of Express FC against KCCA FC at MTN Omondi Stadium in Kampala. He managed to put an outstanding performance and emerged as player of the match.

On 5 December 2023, Ramz Kawooya made his 6th appearance in Express FC squad and his 4th start on the team line-up this 2023–24 season. He put up an amazing performance in their 1–1 draw at home to Bul FC.

== Personal stats ==
Uganda Premier League 2023 / 2024 Season
Apps	Bench Starts	Total Shots	Shots On Target	Pass Accuracy	Tackles	Fouls	Goals
12	2	11	5	78%	41	5	0

== International ==
Ramz Kawooya was called up on the Uganda squad which travelled to Morocco to play against Guinea in the World Cup qualifiers (African Qualifiers) and against Somalia as unused substitutes. He also played against Berkane FC of Morocco in a friendly match. In 2024, Ramz Kawooya featured on the Uganda lineup squad that played a friendly match against Kuwait in preparation for the World Cup Qualifiers (African Category) a match that was played from Cairo International Stadium in Egypt.

Club Career Stats
Club	Years	Apps	Goals
Kataka United	2016 - 2022	254	28
Express FC	2023	12	0

== Honors ==
- Young Player of the tournament 2015
- Best midfielder U17 2016
- Player of the match 2023
