= 1980 Uganda National League =

Football season in Uganda

Uganda National League
- Season: 1980
- Champions: Nile Breweries
- Top goalscorer: Davis Kamoga, Kampala City Council FC (21)

The 1980 Uganda National League was the 13th season of the Ugandan football championship, the top-level football league of Uganda.

== Overview ==
The 1980 Uganda National League was contested by 16 teams and was won by Nile Breweries from Jinja, while COOPS, Mbarara and Bell FC were relegated.

== League standings ==
Pos	Team	Pld	W	D	L	GF	GA	GD	Pts	Qualification or relegation
1	Nile Breweries (C)	30	17	9	4	50	22	+28	43	Champions
2	Nytil FC	30	17	8	5	48	29	+19	42	
3	Kampala City Council	30	16	8	6	51	26	+25	40	
4	Uganda Commercial Bank	30	15	8	7	49	28	+21	38	
5	Express FC	30	14	6	10	46	41	+5	34	
6	Coffee SC	30	11	11	8	50	37	+13	33	
7	Tobacco (Bugembe)	30	11	10	9	40	38	+2	32	
8	Nakivubo Villa	30	11	9	10	40	36	+4	31	
9	Mbale Heroes	30	11	6	13	34	33	+1	28	
10	Maroons FC	30	9	10	11	29	37	−8	28	
11	Masaka Union FC	30	10	8	12	37	51	−14	28	
12	NIC	30	9	8	13	26	42	−16	26	
13	Nsambya Old Timers	30	7	8	15	27	37	−10	22	
14	COOPS (R)	30	6	7	17	27	45	−18	19	Relegated
15	Mbarara United FC (R)	30	8	3	19	26	53	−27	19	Relegated
16	Bell FC (R)	30	6	5	19	28	54	−26	17	Relegated

(C) Champions; (R) Relegated

== Leading goalscorer ==
The top goalscorer in the 1980 season was Davis Kamoga of Kampala City Council FC with 21 goals.
