= Dragan Popadić =

Serbian football manager and player

Personal information
- Date of birth: 4 February 1945 (age 81)
- Place of birth: Šabac, PR Serbia, FPR Yugoslavia
- Position: Defender

Youth career
- Partizan Majur
- Radnički Beograd

Senior career*
Years	Team	Apps	(Gls)
1968–1969	Radnički Beograd	30	(2)
1969	Eskişehirspor	0	(0)
1970	Radnički Kragujevac	17	(0)
1970–1972	Olimpija Ljubljana	66	(2)
1972–1973	OFK Beograd	26	(0)
1973–1974	Olimpija Ljubljana	31	(1)
1975	Haarlem	3	(0)
1976	Lierse	6	(0)
Total		179	(5)

Managerial career
- 1988: Mačva Šabac
- 1994–1996: Simba
- 1996–1997: Express
- 1998: Rwanda
- 1999: Petro Atlético
- 2011: King Faisal
- 2015–2016: Ethiopian Coffee
- 2016: African Lyon
- 2017: Ethiopian Coffee
- 2019: Singida United
- * Club domestic league appearances and goals

Dragan Popadić (Serbian Cyrillic: Драган Попадић; born 4 February 1945- died 18 April 2026) is a Serbian former football manager and player.

== Playing career ==
Born in Majur, a village near Šabac, Popadić began playing football at local club Partizan. He later joined the youth system of Radnički Beograd, making his senior debut in the 1968–69 Yugoslav Second League. During his career, Popadić made 140 appearances in the Yugoslav First League, mostly with Olimpija Ljubljana in the early 1970s. He also spent some time playing in the Benelux countries before retiring.

== Managerial career ==
After a long hiatus beginning in 1999, Popadić was appointed as new manager of Ghana Premier League club King Faisal in February 2011. He was dismissed from his position in April due to poor results.

In July 2015, Popadić became the first foreign manager of Ethiopian Premier League club Ethiopian Coffee. He parted ways with them following the expiration of his contract at the end of the 2015–16 season. In May 2017, Popadić returned to the club as manager, remaining in charge until October.

== Honours ==
Simba

- Tanzanian Premier League: 1994, 1995
- Tanzania FA Cup: 1995

Express

- Uganda Super League: 1996
