= 2002–03 Uganda Super League =

Football season in Uganda

Uganda Super League
- Season: 2002–03
- Champions: SC Villa
- Top goalscorer: Hassan Mubiru, Express FC (16)

The 2002–03 Ugandan Super League was the 36th season of the official Ugandan football championship, the top-level football league of Uganda.

== Overview ==
The 2002–03 Uganda Super League was contested by 15 teams and was won by SC Villa, while Buikwe Red Stars, Mbarara United, Game Boys FC and Akol FC were relegated.

== League standings ==
Pos	Team	Pld	W	D	L	GF	GA	GD	Pts	Qualification or relegation
1	SC Villa (C)	27	23	3	1	53	4	+49	72	Champions
2	Express FC	27	23	3	1	55	9	+46	72	
3	Kampala City Council FC	27	16	5	6	52	25	+27	53	
4	Uganda Revenue Authority SC	27	15	8	4	37	16	+21	53	
5	Masaka Local Council FC	27	13	8	6	32	18	+14	47	
6	SC Simba	27	11	5	11	35	33	+2	38	
7	Police FC	27	9	9	9	34	29	+5	36	
8	Mbale Heroes	27	9	6	12	28	35	−7	33	
9	Kinyara Sugar Works FC	27	9	5	13	27	37	−10	32	
10	Tower of Praise TV	27	8	7	12	31	41	−10	31	
11	Iganga Town Council FC	27	9	4	14	27	42	−15	31	
12	Buikwe Red Stars (R)	27	6	4	17	17	42	−25	22	Relegated
13	Mbarara United FC (R)	27	4	3	20	27	58	−31	16 (Note: 1 bonus point awarded?)	Relegated
14	Game Boys FC (R)	27	3	2	22	21	59	−38	11	Relegated
15	Akol FC (R)	14	1	2	11	7	35	−28	5	Relegated

(C) Champions; (R) Relegated

== Leading goalscorer ==
The top goalscorer in the 2002–03 season was Hassan Mubiru of Express FC with 16 goals.
