= Uganda Cup =

Association football tournament

- Organiser(s): FUFA
- Founded: 1971
- Region: Uganda
- Teams: 168
- Current champions: Kitara (2nd title)
- Most championships: Express and Kampala Capital City Authority (10 titles)
- Broadcaster(s): FUFA TV and UBC
- Website: fufa.co.ug
- 2026–27 Uganda Cup

The Uganda Cup is Uganda's main national cup competition in football. This annual competition is open for member clubs of the Federation of Uganda Football Associations.

The Uganda Cup is the second most prestigious competition in Uganda football.

It is played on a knock out basis. This annual competition is open for non league sides, registered clubs playing in all the five football divisions (Div I, II, III, IV and V) of the Federation of Uganda Football Associations (FUFA)

== Background ==
The Uganda Cup was first held in 1971. The current holders are BUL FC who won the cup by defeating VIPERS SC 3-1 on 12 June 2022 in Masindi district. Express and KCCA FC now hold the record number of wins with 10 cup titles, followed by Villa who have won 9 titles.

The winner of the competition represents Uganda in the CAF Confederations Cup and CECAFA Nile Basin Cup Winners Cup (maiden edition 2014).

== List of cup winners ==
Season	Winners	Result	Runners-up
1971	Coffee United	2-1	Simba
1972–75	Competition not held		
1976	Gangama United FC (Mbale)	0–0 (p. 4–2)	Coffee United
1977	Simba	w/o	Nytil FC
1978	Nsambya Old Timers FC	1-0	Uganda Commercial Bank FC
1979	Kampala City Council FC	w/o	Uganda Commercial Bank FC
1980	Kampala City Council FC	2-0	Maroons
1981	Coffee United	1-1 (p. 5–4)	Uganda Commercial Bank FC
1982	Kampala City Council FC	1–0 abandoned	Nile Breweries FC
1983	Villa	1-0	Kampala City Council FC
1984	Kampala City Council FC	3-2	Coffee United
1985	Express	3-1	Kampala City Council FC
1986	Villa	2-0	Tobacco FC
1987	Kampala City Council FC	1-0	Villa
1988	Villa	3-1	Express
1989	Villa	4-2	Express
1990	Kampala City Council FC	3-0	Villa
1991	Express	4-1	Nile Breweries FC
1992	Express	1-0	Nile Breweries FC
1993	Kampala City Council FC	2-1	Dairy Heroes FC (Mbale)
1994	Express	0–0 (p. 4–3)	Kampala City Council FC
1995	Express	2-0	Posta FC
1996	Uganda Electricity Board FC	1-0	Nile Breweries FC
1997	Express	4-1	Uganda Electricity Board FC
1998	Villa	2-0	Simba
1999	Dairy Heroes FC (Mbale)	0–0 (aet) (p. 3–0)	Lyantonde FC

Season	Winners	Result	Runners-up
2000	Villa	1-0	Military Police FC
2001	Express	3-1	Villa
2002	Villa	2-1	Express
2002–03	Express	3-1	Police
2004	Kampala City Council FC	1–1 (p. 3–2)	Express
2005	Uganda Revenue Authority	2-1	Kampala City Council FC
2006	Express	2-0	Maji FC
2006–07	Express	0–0 (p. 4–2)	Kampala City Council FC
2007–08	Victors	1-0	Kinyara FC (Masindi)
2008–09	Villa	2-1	Uganda Revenue Authority
2009–10	Victors	1–1 (p. 5–4)	Simba
2010–11	Simba	2-1	Uganda Revenue Authority
2011–12	Uganda Revenue Authority	1-0	Bunamwaya SC
2012–13	SC Victoria University	1–1 (p. 5–3)	Vipers SC
2013–14	Uganda Revenue Authority	2–2 (p. 4–2)	Kampala Capital City Authority
2014–15	Villa	3–0	Kampala Capital City Authority
2015–16	Vipers	3–1	Onduparaka FC
2017	Kampala Capital City Authority	2–0	Paidha Black Angels
2018	Kampala Capital City Authority	1–0	Vipers SC
2019	Proline FC	1-1 (p. 5–4)	Bright Stars
2020	Not played because of COVID-19		
2021	Vipers	8-1	Bul
2022	Bul	3-1	Vipers
2023	Vipers	1-0	Police
2024	Kitara	1-0	NEC
2025	Vipers	1-0	Kampala Capital City Authority
2026	Kitara	2-1	Villa

== Performance by club ==
Club	Other names	Settlement	Winners	R/U	Cup titles
Kampala Capital City Authority	Kampala City Council, KCC & KCCA	Kampala	10	8	1979, 1980, 1982, 1984, 1987, 1990, 1993, 2004, 2016–17, 2018
Express	Express Red Eagles	Kampala	10	4	1985, 1991, 1992, 1994, 1995, 1997, 2001, 2002–03, 2006, 2006–07
Villa	Nakivubo Villa & Nakivubo Boys	Kampala	9	4	1983, 1986, 1988, 1989, 1998, 2000, 2002, 2008–09, 2014–15, 2026
Vipers	Bunamwaya SC	Wakiso	4	4	2015–16, 2021, 2023, 2025
Uganda Revenue Authority	URA	Kampala	3	2	2005, 2011–12, 2013–14
Simba	Simba SC & Army FC	Lugazi	2	3	1977, 2010–11
Coffee United	Coffee Kakira	Kakira	2	2	1971, 1981
Mbale Heroes	Gangama United & Dairy Heroes	Mbale	2	1	1976, 1999
Victors		Jinja (previously Kampala)	2	-	2007–08, 2009–10
Kitara		Hoima	2	-	2024, 2026
Uganda Electricity Board	Umeme & UCI	Jinja	1	1	1996
Bul		Jinja	1	1	2022
Nsambya Old Timers	Nsambya	Kampala	1	-	1978
SC Victoria University	SCVU	Kampala	1	-	2012–13
Proline FC		Kampala	1	-	2019
Nile Breweries	Nile	Jinja	-	4	-----
Uganda Commercial Bank	UCB	Kampala	-	3	-----
Police	Uganda Police	Jinja	-	2	-----
Kinyara Sugar Works		Masindi	-	1	-----
Lyantonde		Lyantonde	-	1	-----
Maji		Kampala	-	1	-----
Maroons	Prisons	Luzira	-	1	-----
Military Police		Kampala	-	1	-----
Nytil		Jinja	-	1	-----
Paidha Black Angels	-	Paidha	-	1	-----
Posta		Kampala	-	1	-----
Tobacco		Bugembe	-	1	-----
Bright Stars		Matugga	-	1	-----
National Enterprises Corporation	NEC	Bugolobi	-	1	-----
