= Justus Mugisha =

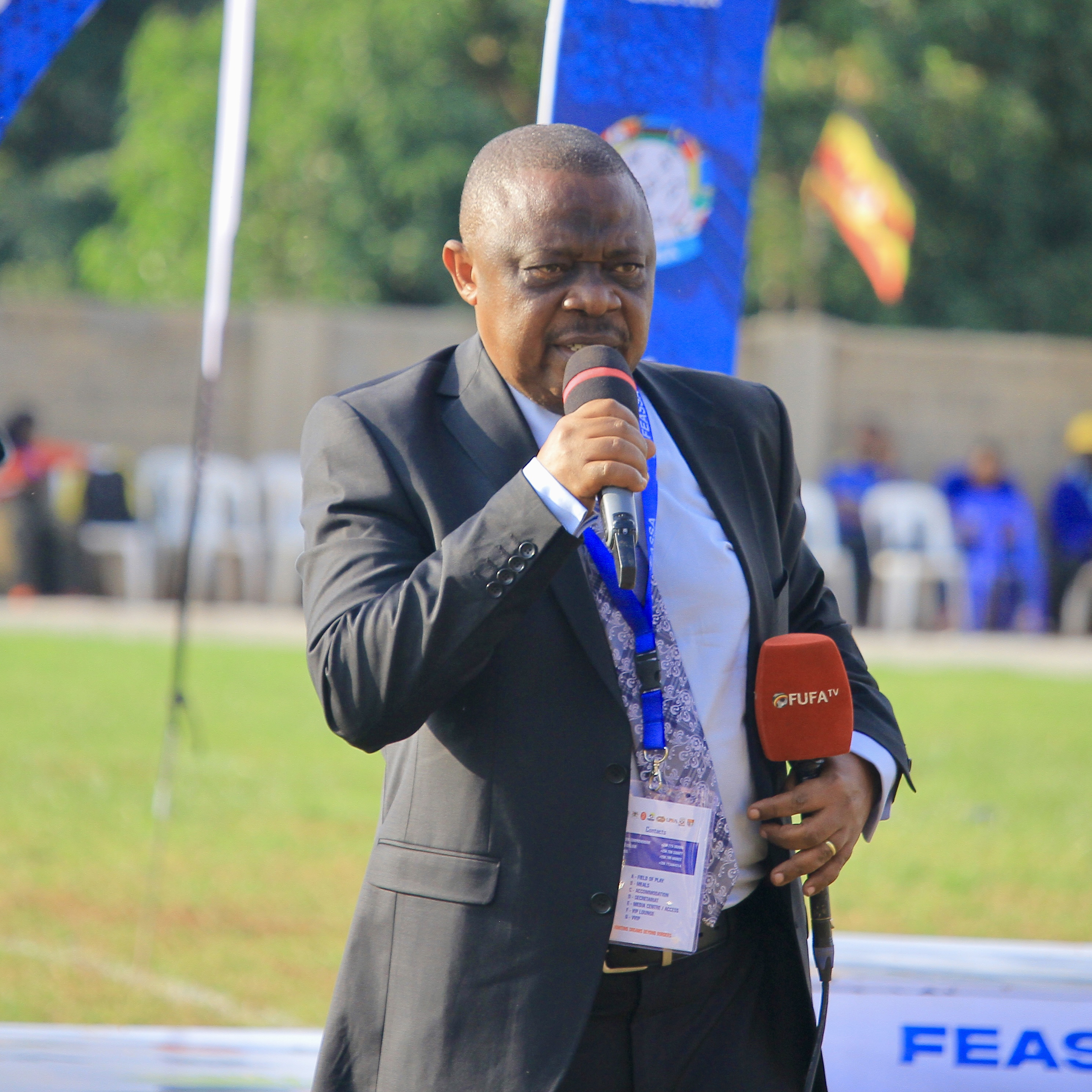
- USSSA President Mugisha
- Born: April 27, 1965 (age 61)
- Occupation: Sports Administrator

Justus Mugisha (born 27 April 1965) is a Ugandan sports administrator and teacher. He is the current first vice president of the Federation of Uganda Football Associations (FUFA). He is also president of the Uganda Secondary Schools Sports Association (USSSA). He also serves as the president of the Federation of Secondary Schools Sports Association (FEASSSA). He is also the president of the International School Sport Federation (ISF) Technical commission in charge of Football. He is also a member of the executive committee of the Africa school sport federation.

== Background and education ==
Justus Mugisha was born on 27 April 1965 in Rugyeyo, Kanungu in Western Uganda and currently lives in Kampala, Uganda.

In 2023, Mugisha was elected as the president for Federation of Secondary Schools Sports Association. He was re-elected in 2017 for another four-year term.

Justus Mugisha went to Nyakabungo Primary School, Ibanda Secondary School, Ntare School before joining Makerere University in 1992 for a Bachelor of Science degree in education (Honors).

== Career ==
Teaching career:

Mugisha is a retired teacher and one of the directors at Standard High School, Zzana.

Administrative career:

In 2001, Mugisha became a Federation of Uganda Football Associations (FUFA) delegate and started representing schools in 2009. He was appointed the first vice president of Federation of Uganda Football Associations (FUFA) in 2006, a position he held until 2009. He was reappointed at Federation of Uganda Football Associations (FUFA) as the first vice president in charge of administration in 2013.

Mugisha is the president of the Federation of Secondary Schools Sports Association (FEASSSA) since 2003. He is also the president of the International School Sport Federation (ISF) Technical commission in charge of Football.

Mugisha also served as the treasurer for Uganda Secondary School Sports Association (USSSA) from 2003 to 2023. In 2023, Mugisha was elected as Uganda Secondary School Sports Association (USSSA) president.

In 2023, Mugisha was elected to the executive committee of the African School Sport Federation for 4 years.
