= Pius Ssebulime =

Ugandan footballer (born 2004)

Personal information
- Date of birth: 6 June 2004 (age 22)
- Place of birth: Kasana in Masaka District
- Height: 5 ft 9 in (1.75 m)
- Position: Midfielder

College career
Years	Team	Apps	(Gls)
- Rutgers University Soccer team

Senior career*
Years	Team	Apps	(Gls)
- Annapolis Blues FC
- * Club domestic league appearances and goals

Pius Ssebulime (born 6 June 2004) is a Ugandan footballer who plays as a midfielder for American club Annapolis Blues FC. The club was founded in 2022 and competes in the Chesapeake Division of USL League Two, considered the fourth tier of the United States soccer league system. He also played for Kampala Capital City Authority FC between 2020 and 2022. The club competes in Uganda Premier League.

== Early life and education ==
Pius Ssebulime was born in Kasana Masaka District to Mayega Bonny and Nassanga Getrude, he started his education Journey at Nyendo Modern Primary School (P.1-P.7) in Masaka District where he sat his PLE in 2017.

In 2018, he joined Masaka Secondary School (S.1-S.4) where he got Uganda Certificate of Education in 2021. He joined St. Henry's College Kitovu for his A'Level education (S.5) but he spent one year at Kitovu and returned to Masaka Secondary School where he completed his A'Level in 2023.

In 2025 he left Uganda and furthered his studies at Gardner–Webb University in United States, then in 2026 he joined Rutgers University where he is still studying to date.

== Football career ==
Ssebulime's football career roots from Masaka, he played for Masaka Secondary School in 2020 and 2021 in the Uganda Secondary Schools Sports Association games, he played for St. Henry's College Kitivu in 2022 in the same competitions.

In 2020, he joined Kampala Capital City Authority FC youth team and won them the Cambiasso Youth tournament which was held in Tanzania in 2022. He also got an U17 National team call in 2021 and in 2023 he got an U20 national team call.

In August 2023 he joined C.D. Feirense in Portugal where he spent a half a season and returned to Uganda

As a captain, in 2024 he helped Buddu Sazza football team to win the 2024 Buganda Masaza Cup tournament and also voted the Buganda Kingdom football player of the year 2024. In July 2025 he joined Gardner Webb University Men's Soccer team that is competing in the NCAA Division I Big South Conference, he joined on a full scholarship, After playing 18 games for Webb, he joined Rutgers University for education, pursuing a bachelor's in Sports Management. Subsequently, he was also signed by Annapolis Blues FC in 2026.

== Honours ==
- Masaza cup winner with Buddu in 2024
- Buganda football player of the year for 2024
- Cambiasso Youth Tournament winner in 2022
