= 2005 Uganda Super League =

Football season in Uganda

Uganda Super League
- Season: 2005
- Champions: Police FC
- Top goalscorer: Martin Muwanga, Police FC; Geoffrey Sserunkuma, KCC FC (8)

The 2005 Ugandan Super League was the 38th season of the official Ugandan football championship, the top-level football league of Uganda.

== Overview ==
The 2005 Uganda Super League used a different format with 15 teams divided into 3 groups with 8 qualifying teams then progressing to the knock-out phase. The championship playoff was won by Police FC who defeated SC Villa 3-1 on penalties following a 0-0 draw in the final at Namboole Stadium. Those teams that failed to qualify for the knock-out phase entered a relegation pool but some teams failed to complete their league fixtures.

== League standings ==
=== Group A ===
Pos	Team	Pld	W	D	L	GF	GA	GD	Pts	Qualification
1	SC Villa (Q)	8	6	2	0	11	1	+10	20	Qualified
2	Masaka Local Council FC (Q)	8	3	3	2	9	9	0	12	Qualified
3	Uganda Revenue Authority SC (Q)	8	2	5	1	8	4	+4	11	Qualified
4	Lugazi United	8	1	2	5	8	15	−7	5	Relegation Pool
5	Mbarara United FC	8	1	2	5	6	13	−7	5	Relegation Pool

(Q) Qualified for the phase indicated

=== Group B ===
Pos	Team	Pld	W	D	L	GF	GA	GD	Pts	Qualification
1	Police FC (Q)	8	5	3	0	12	2	+10	18	Qualified
2	Victors FC (Q)	8	4	3	1	11	7	+4	15	Qualified
3	Kampala City Council FC (Q)	8	4	2	2	18	9	+9	14	Qualified
4	Mityana UTODA	8	1	1	6	12	14	−2	4	Relegation Pool
5	Gulu United FC	8	1	1	6	4	25	−21	4	Relegation Pool

(Q) Qualified for the phase indicated

=== Group C ===
Pos	Team	Pld	W	D	L	GF	GA	GD	Pts	Qualification
1	Express FC (Q)	8	5	2	1	10	4	+6	17	Qualified
2	SC Simba (Q)	8	5	1	2	15	6	+9	16	Qualified
3	Kampala United	8	3	1	4	7	12	−5	10	Relegation Pool
4	Kinyara Sugar Works FC	8	2	2	4	4	7	−3	8	Relegation Pool
5	Kakira Sugar	8	1	2	5	6	13	−7	5	Relegation Pool

(Q) Qualified for the phase indicated

== Championship playoff ==
=== Quarter-finals ===
==== First leg ====
26 July 2005	Kampala City Council FC	3–2	SC Simba

27 July 2005	Police FC	4–2	Masaka Local Council FC

July 2005	Express FC	1–1	Uganda Revenue Authority SC

July 2005	SC Villa	1–0	Victors FC

==== Second leg ====
29 July 2005	SC Simba	0–2 (2 – 5 agg.)	Kampala City Council FC

30 July 2005	Masaka Local Council FC	0–0 (2–4 agg.)	Police FC

1 August 2005	Victors FC	0–1 (0–2 agg.)	SC Villa

August 2005	Uganda Revenue Authority SC	3–3 (4–4a agg.)	Express FC

=== Semi-finals ===
==== First leg ====
2 August 2005	Kampala City Council FC	0–2	SC Villa

3 August 2005	Express FC	1–1	Police FC

==== Second leg ====
8 August 2005	Police FC	2–1 (3–2 agg.)	Express FC

9 August 2005	SC Villa	2–1 (4–1 agg.)	Kampala City Council FC

=== Final ===
23 September 2005	SC Villa	0–0 (1-3 p)	Police FC	Namboole Stadium

== Leading goalscorer ==
The top goalscorers in the 2005 season were Martin Muwanga (Police FC) and Geoffrey Sserunkuma (Kampala City Council FC) with 8 goals each.

== Relegation pool ==
Kinyara Sugar Works FC and Kampala United finished top of the table and avoided relegation from the Super League. Mbarara United FC, Lugazi United, Kakira Sugar, Gulu United FC and Mityana UTODA were relegated, the latter two clubs having failed to fulfill their fixtures.
