= 1968–69 Uganda National First Division League =

Football season in Uganda

Uganda National First Division League
- Season: 1968–69
- Champions: Prisons
- Goals: Alex Oyote

The 1968–69 Uganda National First Division League was the first season of the Ugandan football championship, the top-level football league of Uganda.

== Overview ==
The 1968–69 Uganda National First Division League was contested by 8 teams and was won by Prisons.

== League standings ==
Pos	Team	Pld	W	D	L	GF	GA	GD	Pts	Qualification
1	Prisons FC (C)	14	11	2	1	51	16	+35	24	Champions
2	Simba FC	14	10	1	3	41	14	+27	21	
3	Coffee Kakira	14	8	5	1	33	14	+19	21	
4	Express FC	14	8	2	4	32	17	+15	18	
5	Jinja	14	4	4	6	33	29	+4	12	
6	Masaka	14	4	1	9	39	38	+1	9	
7	Mbarara United FC	14	2	1	11	20	57	−37	5	
8	Mbale	14	1	0	13	14	77	−63	2	

(C) Champions
