= 2008–09 Uganda Super League =

Football season in Uganda

Uganda Super League
- Season: 2008–09
- Champions: Uganda Revenue Authority SC
- Top goalscorer: Peter Ssenyonjo, Police FC (22)

The 2008–09 Ugandan Super League was the 42nd season of the official Ugandan football championship, the top-level football league of Uganda.

== Overview ==
The 2008–09 Uganda Super League was contested by 18 teams and was won by Uganda Revenue Authority SC, while Mbarara United FC, Bugerere FC, Youfra FC, Sharing FC and Kakira FC were relegated.

== League standings ==
Pos	Team	Pld	W	D	L	GF	GA	GD	Pts	Qualification or relegation
1	Uganda Revenue Authority SC (C)	34	24	6	4	60	16	+44	78	Champions
2	Kampala City Council FC	34	24	6	4	60	21	+39	78	
3	SC Villa	34	21	9	4	57	22	+35	72	
4	Bunamwaya SC	34	19	6	9	60	29	+31	63	
5	Simba FC	34	17	11	6	35	21	+14	62	
6	Police FC	34	18	6	10	58	25	+33	60	
7	Nalubaale FC	34	17	8	9	46	31	+15	59	
8	Express FC	34	14	11	9	28	24	+4	53	
9	Maji FC	34	14	5	15	36	36	0	47	
10	Victors FC	34	11	11	12	31	30	+1	44	
11	Kinyara Sugar Works FC	34	10	8	16	32	41	−9	38	
12	Boroboro Tigers FC	34	9	11	14	22	37	−15	38	
13	Iganga Town Council FC	34	9	10	15	29	39	−10	37	
14	Mbarara United FC (R)	34	7	14	13	22	30	−8	35	Relegated
15	Bugerere FC (R)	34	5	8	21	18	60	−42	23	Relegated
16	Youfra FC (R)	34	3	10	21	14	47	−33	19	Relegated
17	Sharing FC (R)	34	3	8	23	19	78	−59	17	Relegated
18	Kakira FC (R)	34	2	10	22	18	58	−40	16	Relegated

(C) Champions; (R) Relegated

== Leading goalscorer ==
The top goalscorer in the 2008–09 season was Peter Ssenyonjo of Police FC with 22 goals.
