= 1997 Uganda Cup =

Tournament details
- Country: Uganda

Final positions
- Champions: Express Red Eagles
- Runners-up: Uganda Electricity Board FC

The 1997 Uganda Cup was the 23rd season of the main Ugandan football cup.

== Overview ==
The competition was known as the Kakungulu Cup and was won by Express Red Eagles who beat Uganda Electricity Board FC 4–1 in the final. The results are not available for the earlier rounds. The 1997 super league title was won by Kampala City Council Football Club, with Express Football Club Finishing in the third place.

== Final ==
The Express Red won the 1997 Uganda Cup, defeating Uganda Electricity Board FC 4-1.

Tie no	Team 1	Score	Team 2
1	Express Red Eagles	4–1	Uganda Electricity Board FC
