= 1974 Uganda National League =

Football season in Uganda

Uganda National League
- Season: 1974
- Champions: Express FC
- Top goalscorer: Peter Kirumira, Express FC (14)

The 1974 Uganda National League was the seventh season of the Ugandan football championship, the top-level football league of Uganda.

== Overview ==
The 1974 Uganda National League was contested by 8 teams and was won by Express FC. In the two previous seasons of 1972 and 1973 the championship was not completed because of civil unrest.

== League standings ==
Pos	Team	Pld	W	D	L	GF	GA	GD	Pts	Qualification
1	Express FC (C)	14	9	4	1	29	12	+17	22	Champions
2	Kampala City Council FC	14	10	1	3	29	16	+13	21	
3	Simba FC	14	8	3	3	26	14	+12	19	
4	Lint Marketing Board	14	5	4	5	21	19	+2	14	
5	Coffee SC	14	4	5	5	23	23	0	13	
6	Prisons FC Kampala	14	4	4	6	14	17	−3	12	
7	Uganda Police FC	14	4	1	9	11	24	−13	9	
8	Kilembe Mines FC	14	0	4	10	9	30	−21	4	

(C) Champions

== Leading goalscorer ==
The top goalscorer in the 1974 season was Peter Kirumira of Express FC with 14 goals.
