= 1981 Uganda Cup =

Tournament details
- Country: Uganda

Final positions
- Champions: Coffee Kakira
- Runners-up: Uganda Commercial Bank FC

1981 Uganda Cup was the seventh season of the main Ugandan football Cup.

== Overview ==
The competition has also been known as the Kakungulu Cup and was won by Coffee Kakira who beat Uganda Commercial Bank FC 5–4 on penalties in the final. The score was level at 1–1 at the end of normal play.

Results are not available for the earlier rounds, although it is known that Kampala City Council FC conceded a contentious match to Uganda Commercial Bank in the semi-final. KCC players were subsequently accused of match-fixing in particular Godfrey Kateregga who had a one-on-one against UCB's keeper Jimmy Bossa Jnr but instead turned and sent a long back pass to his goalkeeper John Tebusweke. There appears to have been a reciprocal arrangement where UCB conceded a vital league match in order to assist KCC take the league title. The scandal has been identified as one of the most serious match fixing episodes in Ugandan football.

== Final ==
Tie no	Team 1	Score	Team 2
1	Coffee Kakira	1–1 (p. 5–4)	Uganda Commercial Bank FC
