= 2011–12 Uganda Super League =

Football season in Uganda

Uganda Super League
- Season: 2011–12
- Champions: Express FC
- Top goalscorer: Robert Ssentongo, Uganda Revenue Authority SC (13)

The 2011–12 Ugandan Super League was the 45th season of the official Ugandan football championship, the top-level football league of Uganda.

== Overview ==
The 2011–12 Uganda Super League was contested by 15 teams and was won by Express FC, while Hoima-Busia and UTODA were relegated.

== League standings ==
Pos	Team	Pld	W	D	L	GF	GA	GD	Pts	Qualification or relegation
1	Express FC (C)	28	15	9	4	39	21	+18	54	Champions
2	Bunamwaya SC	28	15	8	5	46	18	+28	53	
3	Uganda Revenue Authority SC	28	14	9	5	40	23	+17	51	
4	Simba FC	28	13	7	8	26	21	+5	46	
5	SC Villa	28	12	9	7	25	20	+5	45	
6	Proline FC	28	11	11	6	30	16	+14	44	
7	Kampala City Council FC	28	12	8	8	32	22	+10	44	
8	Masaka Local Council FC	28	11	5	12	21	24	−3	38	
9	Water FC	28	7	13	8	18	27	−9	34	
10	Maroons FC	28	8	9	11	25	25	0	33	
11	Victors FC	28	7	12	9	21	22	−1	33	
12	Police FC	28	6	13	9	23	30	−7	31	
13	Bul FC	28	7	10	11	21	31	−10	31	
14	Hoima-Busia (R)	28	5	5	18	22	48	−26	20	Relegated
15	UTODA (R)	28	0	6	22	16	57	−41	6	Relegated
16	Fire Masters	0	–	–	–	–	–	—	0	Expelled

(C) Champions; (R) Relegated

== Leading goalscorer ==
The top goalscorer in the 2011–12 season was Robert Ssentongo of Uganda Revenue Authority SC with 13 goals.
