= 1993 Uganda Super League =

Football season in Uganda

Uganda Super League
- Season: 1993
- Champions: Express FC
- Top goalscorer: Mathias Kaweesa, SC Villa (20)

The 1993 Ugandan Super League was the 26th season of the official Ugandan football championship, the top-level football league of Uganda.

== Overview ==
The 1993 Uganda Super League was contested by 15 teams and was won by Express FC, while Wandegeya FC, Busia and Uganda Airlines were relegated.

== League standings ==
Pos	Team	Pld	W	D	L	GF	GA	GD	Pts	Qualification or relegation (Note: Final table indicates that some matches were not completed.)
1	Express FC (C)	28	20	7	1	60	15	+45	47	Champions
2	SC Villa	28	19	7	2	53	11	+42	45	
3	Kampala City Council FC	27	17	7	3	45	8	+37	41	
4	Dairy Corporation	28	10	13	5	34	21	+13	33	
5	Coffee Kakira	27	12	7	8	41	32	+9	31	
6	Nile Breweries	28	12	7	9	33	25	+8	31	
7	Arua Municipal Council FC	28	12	7	9	35	41	−6	31	
8	Nsambya Old Timers	28	10	10	8	32	25	+7	30	
9	Uganda Commercial Bank	28	8	8	12	36	32	+4	24	
10	Uganda Electricity Board	28	8	8	12	36	32	+4	24	
11	Bell FC	27	7	4	16	21	41	−20	18	
12	Miracle	27	7	4	16	21	41	−20	18	
13	Wandegeya FC (R)	28	5	7	16	21	41	−20	17	Relegated
14	Busia (R)	27	4	2	21	19	60	−41	10	Relegated
15	Uganda Airlines (R)	26	2	2	22	16	56	−40	6	Relegated

(C) Champions; (R) Relegated

== Leading goalscorer ==
The top goalscorer in the 1993 season was Mathias Kaweesa of SC Villa with 20 goals.
