= Fred Kajoba =

Ugandan footballer (1969–2024)

Personal information
- Date of birth: 5 May 1969
- Place of birth: Uganda
- Date of death: 13 May 2024 (aged 55)
- Place of death: Tanzania

Managerial career
- Years: Team
- 2009–2024: Uganda (goalkeeping coach)
- 2023–2024: Ihefu SC
- 2019-2020: Soltilo Bright Stars FC
- 2009–2011: Simba FC
- 1997-2009: Simba FC (assistant coach)
Medal record
Uganda Premier League winner
CECAFA Cup (as Player)
Uganda Cup

Fred Kisitu Kajoba (1969 – 13 May 2024) was a Ugandan football player and coach, known for his contributions to Ugandan football both on and off the field. He died at the age of 54 in Tanzania due to heart failure.

== Early life and career ==
Fred Kajoba began his football career in 1986 with Pepsi FC, a then second-tier team in Uganda. His talent as a goalkeeper was soon recognized, and he gained prominence during the 1987 Bika Bya Baganda tournament, playing for the Fumbe clan. In 1988, he was signed by Coffee FC for a then-record fee of Shs 1 million.

== Playing career ==
Kajoba’s career at Coffee FC saw him rise from fourth-choice goalkeeper to team captain by 1990. He was instrumental in Coffee FC’s near-success in the Ugandan league and Uganda Cup during the early 1990s. Kajoba made his debut for the Uganda national team, the Cranes, in 1991 and was part of the squad that won the Cecafa Cup in 1992.

In the mid-1990s, Kajoba transitioned to playing as a striker due to a shortage of forwards at Coffee FC. He later played in Oman for Majjees FC before returning to Uganda to join Simba FC, where he continued to play both as a goalkeeper and a striker.

== Coaching career ==
After retiring as a player, Kajoba pursued a coaching career, obtaining a UEFA B license in England. He returned to Uganda and joined Simba FC’s technical bench, eventually becoming the head coach. Kajoba also served as the goalkeeping coach for the Uganda Cranes, contributing to their qualification for the Africa Cup of Nations in 2017 and 2019.

Kajoba’s coaching career included stints with Vipers SC, Solitilo Bright Stars, and Tanzania’s Ihefu FC. He was known for mentoring several top Ugandan goalkeepers, including Denis Onyango, Robert Odongkara, and Jamal Salim Magoola.

== Personal life ==
Outside of football, Kajoba was a successful farmer and a Catholic, earning the nickname “Maama Maria.” He was well-regarded for his friendly demeanor and dedication to his work.

== Death ==
Kajoba died on 13 May 2024, in Tanzania. He was buried on 19 May 2024, at his country home in Malangala sub-county, Uganda.
