= 1995 Uganda Super League =

Football season in Uganda

Uganda Super League
- Season: 1995
- Champions: Express FC
- Top goalscorer: Ibrahim Kizito, Uganda Electricity Board FC (20)

The 1995 Ugandan Super League was the 28th season of the official Ugandan football championship, the top-level football league of Uganda.

== Overview ==
The 1995 Uganda Super League was contested by 15 teams and was won by Express FC, while Miracle FC and Nsambya Old Timers were relegated.

== League standings ==
Pos	Team	Pld	W	D	L	GF	GA	GD	Pts	Qualification or relegation
1	Express FC (C)	28	24	2	2	73	16	+57	74	Champions
2	Uganda Electricity Board FC	28	18	7	3	52	20	+32	61	
3	SC Villa	28	15	7	6	41	19	+22	52	
4	Entebbe Works FC	28	10	13	5	30	23	+7	43	
5	Nile Breweries	28	10	9	9	37	35	+2	39	
6	Kampala City Council FC	28	7	15	6	21	23	−2	36	
7	Mbale Heroes	28	9	7	12	30	48	−18	34	
8	SCOUL	28	7	11	10	28	29	−1	32	
9	State House FC	28	8	7	13	32	31	+1	31	
10	Dairy Corporation	28	7	10	11	35	40	−5	31	
11	Posta	28	8	7	13	34	54	−20	31	
12	Coffee Kakira	28	7	9	12	23	31	−8	30	
13	Miracle FC (R)	28	7	8	13	33	41	−8	29	Relegated
14	Villa International	28	6	10	12	35	57	−22	28	
15	Nsambya Old Timers (R)	28	2	8	18	11	48	−37	14	Relegated

(C) Champions; (R) Relegated

== Leading goalscorer ==
The top goalscorer in the 1995 season was Ibrahim Kizito of Uganda Electricity Board FC with 20 goals.
