= Mbarara United FC =

Association football club in Uganda

- Full name: Mbarara United Football Club
- Ground: Kakyeka stadium, Mbarara, Uganda

Mbarara United Football Club was a Ugandan football club located in Mbarara, Mbarara District in Western Uganda. The club played in the Ugandan Big League in the 2009–10 season but there is currently no FUFA records that confirm that the club is still operating.

== History ==
Mbarara United FC were one of the 8 teams that participated in the inaugural season of the National First Division in 1968–69, the league being the forerunner of the Ugandan Super League. The club dropped out after one season at the highest level but have had 6 spells playing in topflight football covering 9 seasons over a 40-year period.

They last played in the Ugandan Super League in the 2008–09 season and were unfortunate to be relegated having finished in 14th position with 35 points. The following season in 2009–10 they joined the Ugandan Big League, FUFA's new second-tier league, but made little impact in the Rwenzori Group. Their last result in the league was a 7–1 win against Masaka Municipal Council FC. The club has not been active in recent seasons.

Mbarara United FC were financed by club members and the Mbarara Municipal Town Council. As Mbarara is located near the south-western border of the country it is not surprising that naturalised Congolese players often dominated their first team.

=== Record in the top tiers ===
Season	Tier	League	Pos.	Pl.	W	D	L	GS	GA	Pts	Movements
1968–69	1	Uganda National First Division League	7th	14	2	1	11	20	57	5	
1969–79		Participated in lower tiers									
1980	1	Uganda National League	15th	30	8	3	19	26	53	19	Relegated
1981–82		Participated in lower tiers									
1983	1	Uganda Super League	12th	29	8	7	14	29	41	23	Relegated
1984–99		Participated in lower tiers									
2000	1	Uganda Super League	7th	30	11	13	20	45	39	46	
2001	1	Uganda Super League	6th	28	13	5	10	42	41	44	
2002	1	Uganda Super League	10th	28	9	5	14	30	46	32	
2002–03	1	Uganda Super League	13th	27	4	3	20	27	58	16	Relegated
2004		Participated in lower tiers									
2005	1	Uganda Super League – Group A	5th	8	1	2	5	6	13	5	Moved to Relegation Pool
		Uganda Super League – Relegation Pool									Relegated
2006–08		Participated in lower tiers									
2008–09	1	Uganda Super League	14th	34	7	14	13	22	30	35	Relegated
2009–10	2	Uganda Big League – Rwenzori Group	6th	14	5	2	7	17	25	14	Withdrew at end of season.
2011 - present		No information to confirm that the club is operating.									

== See also ==
- Proline FC
- BUL Jinja FC
- Kiira Young FC
