= 1996 Uganda Super League =

Football season in Uganda

Uganda Super League
- Season: 1996
- Champions: Express FC
- Top goalscorer: David Kiwanuka, Uganda Electricity Board FC (21)

The 1996 Ugandan Super League was the 29th season of the official Ugandan football championship, the top-level football league of Uganda.

== Overview ==
The 1996 Uganda Super League was contested by 16 teams and was won by Express FC, while Entebbe Works FC, Coffee Kakira, Villa International and Bushenyi United were relegated.

== League standings ==
Pos	Team	Pld	W	D	L	GF	GA	GD	Pts	Qualification or relegation (Note: Arua Municipal Council FC withdrew)
1	Express FC (C)	30	23	6	1	61	15	+46	75	Champions
2	Kampala City Council FC	30	20	5	5	56	19	+37	65	
3	SC Villa	30	19	8	3	40	16	+24	65	
4	Uganda Electricity Board FC	30	14	8	8	54	29	+25	50	
5	Nile Breweries FC	30	11	10	9	42	30	+12	43	
6	SCOUL	30	13	3	14	35	34	+1	42	
7	Iganga Town Council FC	30	10	10	10	42	29	+13	39 (Note: 1 point deducted?)	
8	Police FC	30	10	9	11	45	35	+10	39	
9	State House FC	30	10	9	11	36	26	+10	39	
10	Posta	30	10	9	11	33	33	0	39	
11	Mbale Dairy Heroes	30	10	8	12	43	49	−6	38	
12	Simba SC	30	11	4	15	53	53	0	37	
13	Entebbe Works FC (R)	30	9	8	13	33	31	+2	35	Relegated
14	Coffee Kakira SC (R)	30	7	10	13	34	52	−18	31	Relegated
15	Villa International (R)	28	5	9	14	24	41	−17	24	Relegated
16	Bushenyi United (R)	30	0	2	28	9	113	−104	2	Relegated

Source: rsssf.com
(C) Champions; (R) Relegated

== Leading goalscorer ==
The top goalscorer in the 1996 season was David Kiwanuka of Uganda Electricity Board FC with 21 goals.
