= Baker Mbowa =

Football Coach

Baker Mbowa is a Ugandan football coach. He has worked with a number of sports clubs in Uganda which include Mbale Heros Footbal Club where he is head coach as of January 2025. He served as head coach in Express Football Club for a 2 year contract, Soltilo Bright Stars FC and Uganda Revenue Authority Football Club as assistant coach.

Mbowa's coaching career has made teams play in national leagues and tournaments like the Uganda Premier League and FUFA Drum. He has launched the Baker Football Academy to develop local sports in Uganda and Internationally having been exposed to International football and an ex player for Uganda Cranes, Uganda national football team. Bakers new academy is in compliance with the national sports regulation under the ministry of Education and sports, including the sports governing body Federation of Uganda Football Association (FUFA) .

Mbowa was relieved of his duties having served as assistant coach in 2022 by Uganda Revenue Authority Footbal Club leaders.

== See also ==
- Federation of Uganda Football Association
- Paul Put
- Tom Ikara
- Ismail Watenga
