= Ndugwa Abraham =

Ugandan footballer (born 1996)

Ndugwa Abraham (born 30 June 1996 in Entebbe) is a Ugandan professional footballer who plays for NK Slavija Pleternica as a centre forward and attacking midfielder.

He left Vipers Soccer Club when his contract ended in 2021 to join FK Buducnost Dobanovci, a Serbian team.

Ndugwa Abraham was a former team captain for Masavu Football Club and a well traveled sportsman.
