= Paidha Black Angels FC =

Association football club in Uganda

- Paidha black angels logo
- Full name: Paidha Black Angels Football Club
- Founded: 1979; 46 years ago
- Ground: Bar Okoro Stadium
- Capacity: 6,000
- League: FUFA Big League
- 2018–19: Uganda Premier League, 16th, relegated
colours	colours

Paidha Black Angels FC is a football team from Paidha, Zombo District, in the West Nile sub-region, in the Northern Region of Uganda. It competed in the 2018-19 Uganda Premier League.

== History ==
Black Angels played the 2018–19 season in the Uganda Premier League after their promotion in the 2017/2018 season. They only managed two wins in their first 26 games and were the first team to have their relegation confirmed.

Black Angels, managed by Allan Kabonge, won the 2017/2018 FUFA Big League promotion playoff to qualify for the top flight. Black Angels were the fourth club Kabonge managed to achieve promotion to the FUFA Big League.

They are also notable for having played in the 2016/2017 Ugandan Cup Final, which they lost 2–0 to KCCA FC.
