= Uganda Secondary Schools Sports Association =

Governing body for school sports in Uganda

- Abbreviation: USSSA
- Formation: 1986
- Type: Sports governing body
- Legal status: Non-profit organization
- Purpose: Development and promotion of secondary school sports in Uganda
- Headquarters: Kampala, Uganda
- Region served: Uganda
- Members: Secondary schools sports teachers in Uganda
- Official language: English
- President: Justus Mugisha
- Main organ: Executive Committee
- Parent organization: Ministry of Education and Sports (Uganda)
- Affiliations: Federation of East Africa Secondary Schools Sports Association
- Website: usssaonline.com

The Uganda Secondary Schools Sports Association (USSSA) is an association of secondary school sports in Uganda who are under the Ministry of Education and Sports (MoES) and Association of Secondary Schools Head Teachers of Uganda (ASSHU).

USSSA organises sports competitions for schools.

== History ==
The USSSA started in 1986 as KSSSA. Schools competed in football, netball and athletics.
