= Hassan Mubiru =

Ugandan footballer (born 1978)

Hassan Mubiru (born 16 December 1978) in Lukuli, Makindye division, Kampala district) is an Ugandan football striker who played for Express FC.

== Early life ==
Born in Lukuli, a suburb of Kampala district in Makindye division, Hassan Mubiru is one of the most talented footballers that Uganda has ever produced. Born on 16 December 1978, Mubiru began his soccer career in school like many other footballers in the country. However, his dream as a child was not to become a footballer as he always dreamt of a career in law or medicine. This wasn't to be as he dropped out of school in O level. He had attended Katwe Noor Primary school before joining Makindye High school for secondary education.

== Career ==
After leaving school in 1994, Mubiru decided to concentrate on football and his career was established at Lukuli United, a first division side in his home village. Coach Walakira Siraje who was handling the side at the time called Mubiru and asked him to train with the club. The forward became a starter immediately. In 1995-96 Kampala first division league competition, Lukuli United featured alongside many teams that among others included Police FC. Mubiru's exploits on the right flank of midfield in the competition caught the eye of many including Police FC Coach, Denis Obua (Former FUFA president) who lured the winger to Nakawa Police play ground to join the cops after joining the country's top tier division super league. At this time, Mubiru was eager to join the side as he wanted to become a super league player.

== Police FC ==
When he joined Police FC, he found it hard breaking into the first team as a winger since Paul Kabyomere was the undisputed right winger at the club. On realizing this, Obua decided to find a new role for his new recruit playing Hassan Mubiru as a centre forward. In his first season at the club, he finished the second runner up in the race for the golden boot. This attracted the attention of big clubs such as Villa, KCC, Express FC and Umeme who began to fight for his signature. In the 1997 player transfer season, Hassan Mubiru opted to join Villa for a fee believed to be between Shs 2m and Shs 3m. However, this surprised many Express fans who believed Mubiru who is alleged to have been sighted at Wankulukuku had already been signed by their club.

== SC. Villa ==
On his arrival at Villa Park, Mubiru found a star studded side that included the likes of Iddi Batambuze, Charles Kayemba, Edgar Watson and didn't find it easy commanding a starting place in the side. However, his quality on the ball was evident for all to see. Coach Paul Hasule who had described Mubiru as a rough diamond that needed polishing transformed the forward into a deadly striker difficult to mark by even the best defenders on the land. Mubiru later formed a striking combination with another youngster Mukasa Andrew. Despite failing to help Villa to the league title in the 1997 season, Mubiru looked a safe bet for a future star centre forward. In 1998, Mubiru helped SC Villa to a league and cup double. The Villa Park side had last won a league title in 1994. He also led the club to finals of the CECAFA club Championship that year for the first time since 1987. Unfortunately, Villa lost the final game to Tanzanian giants Yanga Africans 4-3 on penalties after a barren draw in the 90 minutes in which Mubiru hit a post with a ferocious shot.

== Mu-Mu Attack ==
In 1999, Hassan Mubiru and Andrew Mukasa formed a deadly striking partnership following the falling of Charles Kayemba to third choice in the pecking order. The combination holds a place among the deadliest in the history of Ugandan football. During that season, the duo scored 70 league goals between them with Mukasa scoring 45 to break Kirunda's record of 32 league goals while Mubiru netted 25 goals. SC Villa eventually defended the league title but lost to Mbale Heroes in the semi-finals of the Uganda Cup something that ended Mubiru's dream for a consecutive double. At the end of the season, Express Chairman then Kirumira Godfrey courted Mubiru and eventually lured him to Wankulukuku in a transfer that shocked many Villa fans. It is believed that "money bags" Kirumira had to cough over Shs 10 million for the services of the forward making him the most expensive player in the league at the time.

== FIGO Nick Name ==
Following that transfer to Express FC, the Red eagles’ fans nicknamed him Luis Figo in reference to the Portuguese star who had crossed to rivals Real Madrid from Barcelona in what was the most expensive soccer transfer in the world at the time. Real Madrid president Florentine Perez had engineered the move thus Kirumira getting the alias Perez. Like the Barca fans hated Figo forever, most Villa fans even at the moment have never forgiven Mubiru.

== Express FC ==
At Wankulukuku, Mubiru joined a line up of stars that included James Odoch, Buwembo Ibrahim, Obwiny Phillip, Lwebuga Peter and custodian Kawalya Sam among others. The centre forward was viewed as the man signed to move Express FC to greater heights and dethrone rivals SC Villa as the Kings of the game on the land. However, it didn't happen in the 2000 season as Villa reclaimed the league and won the cup for a double. In 2001, Express FC and Mubiru failed to dislodge Villa as the league champions but the forward helped the side to a Kakungulu Cup scoring a number of important goals including a brace in the 3-1 win over his former club SC Villa in the finals. Mathias Kawesa netted the other as Kenyan striker Maurice Sunguti who had joined Villa from Express FC netted the Jogoos’ consolation on the day. On a personal note, Hassan Mubiru won the golden boot when he top scored in the league with 27 goals. Following the departure of skipper James Odoch in 2002, Express FC appointed Hassan Mubiru as the club captain. The new skipper however failed to lead Express FC to league glory despite winning the golden boot for a second consecutive season. To make matters, Express FC lost to rivals SC Villa 2-1 in the finals. In 2003, Mubiru won the golden boot for a third year running and also captained his side to Kakungulu cup glory with a 3-1 to Police FC in the finals. Hassan Mubiru was again on the score sheet for the Red eagles. The skipper also led Express FC to the semi-finals of CECAFA club championship held in Kampala where they lost 2-1 again to SC Villa in the semi-finals. He led the club to the finals of Uganda Cup the following year losing to city rivals KCC FC in the finals on penalty shoot out.

Mubiru led the Kenyan Premier League in goalscoring three consecutive seasons a row (2001 to 2003) while at Express FC.

== APR FC ==
After five seasons at Express FC, Hassan Mubiru decided to seek challenges abroad and joined Rwandan giants APR FC in 2005. The striker helped the side to a league title and led the Rwanda side to the finals of Cecafa Club Championship where they lost to SC Villa 3-0.

== Return to Express FC ==
Mubiru spent just a single season in Rwanda before rejoining the Red eagles in 2006. He resumed his duties as club captain and was very instrumental in helping the side survive relegation that year with Coach Sam Ssimbwa at the helm. Surprisingly, the side also went on to lift the Kankungulu cup crown after beating Maji 2-0 in the finals. He again led the club to the Uganda cup finals the following year but lost to KCC 4-2 on penalties after drawing goalless after 90 minutes. Hassan then had a professional stint in Denmark with Danish Superliga side Silkeborg before returning to Express FC in 2008. Express FC released the centre forward at the end of the 2008 season and the veteran joined Victors FC amidst controversy that saw another super division side Proline FC claiming the striker had ‘chewed’ their money to play for them. While at Victors FC in 2010, Mubiru again won another Uganda Cup medal after helping the side triumph over Simba SC in the finals 5-4 in penalty shoot out.

== International career ==
In the absence of Turkish-based professional Majid Musisi, Mubiru was called to fill the big shoes of Musisi in the group four African Cup of Nations qualifiers encounter between The Cranes and Algeria in 1998. He made a spectacular historical debut in the game, scoring twice, including a memorable last minute strike that gave Uganda a 2-1 victory. Since then, he played a major part in the national team.

The striker became a poster boy and an instant celebrity as fans nicknamed him Zidane in comparison to French star who had led his country to World Cup victory when he scored twice against Brazil in the finals. Despite Cranes failure to qualify, Mubiru was viewed by many as an heir to the Magic Musisi upfront. In 1999, Mubiru helped U-23 side The Kobs to the semifinals of the All African Games in South Africa. Uganda's highest achievement in the history of the tournament. In 2000, Mubiru played an instrumental role as the Cranes won the CECAFA Challenge title for the first title since 1996. Uganda cranes (A) beat The Lions (B) 2-0 in the finals. He also helped the Cranes win the Castle Cup held in Tanzania converting from the spot in the finals against West African giants Ghana. In 2002, Mubiru was a menace to Samuel Kuffour as Uganda drew 1-1 with Ghana in an AFCON qualifier at Namboole. In his post match interview, the former Bayern Munich defence kingpin inquired where the striker was plying his trade and was surprised to hear Mubiru was playing in the local league and advised him join paid ranks in Europe. In 2006, Hassan Mubiru was instrumental in the 3-0 win over Lesotho making two assists as the Cranes began the quest for AFCON qualification on a winning note. In 2007, he made a beauty of a pass to break a resilient Nigerian defence to set up Geofrey Massa before he was fouled in the area for a penalty that Ibrahim Ssekagya converted to give the Cranes a 2-1 win. Unceremoniously retired from the international duty as he was consistently not summoned for national engagements citing his failure to transform his club goal scoring instincts to national level. Since his retirement, the national team has lacked a striker that can offer the threat Mubiru offered while in national and club color. Hassan Mubiru remains one of Uganda's most technically gifted centre forwards of all time.

== Career statistics ==
=== International ===
Scores and results list Uganda's goal tally first, score column indicates score after each Mubiru goal.

List of international goals scored by Hassan Mubiru
No.	Date	Venue	Opponent	Score	Result	Competition	Ref.
1	2 October 1998	Nakivubo Stadium, Kampala, Uganda	Uganda	1–1	2–1	2000 African Cup of Nations qualification	
2	2 October 1998	Nakivubo Stadium, Kampala, Uganda	Uganda	2–1	2–1	2000 African Cup of Nations qualification	
3	8 April 2000	Nakivubo Stadium, Kampala, Uganda	Guinea	1–2	4–4	2002 FIFA World Cup qualification	
4	1 July 2000	Nakivubo Stadium, Kampala, Uganda	Malawi	1–0	3–1	2002 African Cup of Nations qualification	
5	15 July 2000	Kamuzu Stadium, Blantyre, Malawi	Malawi	1–0	2–1	2002 African Cup of Nations qualification	
6	2 September 2000	Nakivubo Stadium, Kampala, Uganda	Guinea	1–0	3–1	2002 African Cup of Nations qualification	
7	2 September 2000	Nakivubo Stadium, Kampala, Uganda	Guinea	2–0	3–1	2002 African Cup of Nations qualification	
8	25 October 2000	Moi International Sports Centre, Kasarani, Kenya	Ghana	1–0	2–1	Friendly	
9	18 November 2000	Nakivubo Stadium, Kampala, Uganda	Ethiopia	1–1	2–2	2000 CECAFA Cup	
10	23 November 2000	Nakivubo Stadium, Kampala, Uganda	Somalia	–	6–0	2000 CECAFA Cup	
11	27 November 2000	Nakivubo Stadium, Kampala, Uganda	Djibouti	–	7–0	2000 CECAFA Cup	
12	29 November 2000	Nakivubo Stadium, Kampala, Uganda	Rwanda	1–1	3–1	2000 CECAFA Cup	
13	2 December 2000	Nakivubo Stadium, Kampala, Uganda	Uganda B	1–0	2–0	2000 CECAFA Cup	
14	30 July 2002	Al-Hilal Stadium, Omdurman, Sudan	Chad	1–0	2–0	Friendly	
15	24 September 2002	19 May 1956 Stadium, Annaba, Algeria	Algeria	1–0	1–1	Friendly	
16	11 October 2003	Nakivubo Stadium, Kampala, Uganda	Mauritius	2–0	3–0	2006 FIFA World Cup qualification	
17	1 December 2005	Amahoro Stadium, Kigali, Rwanda	Somalia	–	7–0	2005 CECAFA Cup	
18	3 December 2005	Amahoro Stadium, Kigali, Rwanda	Sudan	–	3–0	2005 CECAFA Cup	
