= Nile Breweries FC =

Ugandan football club

Nile Breweries
- Full name: Nile Breweries FC
- Ground: Kakindu Municipal Stadium; Jinja, Uganda

Nile Breweries FC, or Nile Breweries, is a Ugandan football club from Jinja, Uganda.

They play in the Second division of Ugandan football, the Ugandan Big League. In 1980 the team won the Ugandan Super League.

== Honours ==
- Ugandan Super League: 1980

== Performance in CAF competitions ==
- 1981 African Cup of Champions Clubs
