= Express FC =

Association football club in Uganda

Express Football Club
- Full name: Express Football Club
- Nicknames: Red Eagles, Square Pass, Mukwano Gwa bangi
- Founded: 1957; 69 years ago
- Ground: Hamz Stadium
- Capacity: 15,000
- Chairman: Counsel Kiryowa Kiwanuka
- Manager: Badru Kaddu
- League: Uganda Premier League
- 2025–26: 10th
- Website: expressfc.co.ug
Home colours

Express Football Club (abbreviated as Express) is a Ugandan professional football club from Kampala. The club previously played their home games at the Muteesa II Wankulukuku Stadium, but recently shifted to the newly renovated Hamz Stadium, Nakivubo.

== History ==
Express FC is popularly referred to by the club fans as the Red Eagles and has also been known as the Express Sports Club. The club is one of the oldest football clubs in Uganda, having been founded in October 1957 by managers of the Uganda Express Newspapers. The main architect of the club's foundation was Jolly Joe Kiwanuka, the owner of the newspaper, who was ably supported by Paul Ssengendo, Hannington Kiwanuka, Dr. Banabas Kiwanuka, Gaster Nsubuga and Bishop Dr. Dunstan Nsubuga.

The Red Eagles were among the first Ugandan clubs to use football boots and since the club was revived in 1979 they have ever been relegated from the top-tier league. They are the only Super League side that has never featured in the promotional mini leagues. Hassan Mubiru finished the club and league's top scorer for three consecutive seasons from 2001 to 2003.

In total Express FC has won six league championships and ten Uganda Cup titles with the 'double' (league & cup winners) being achieved in 1995.

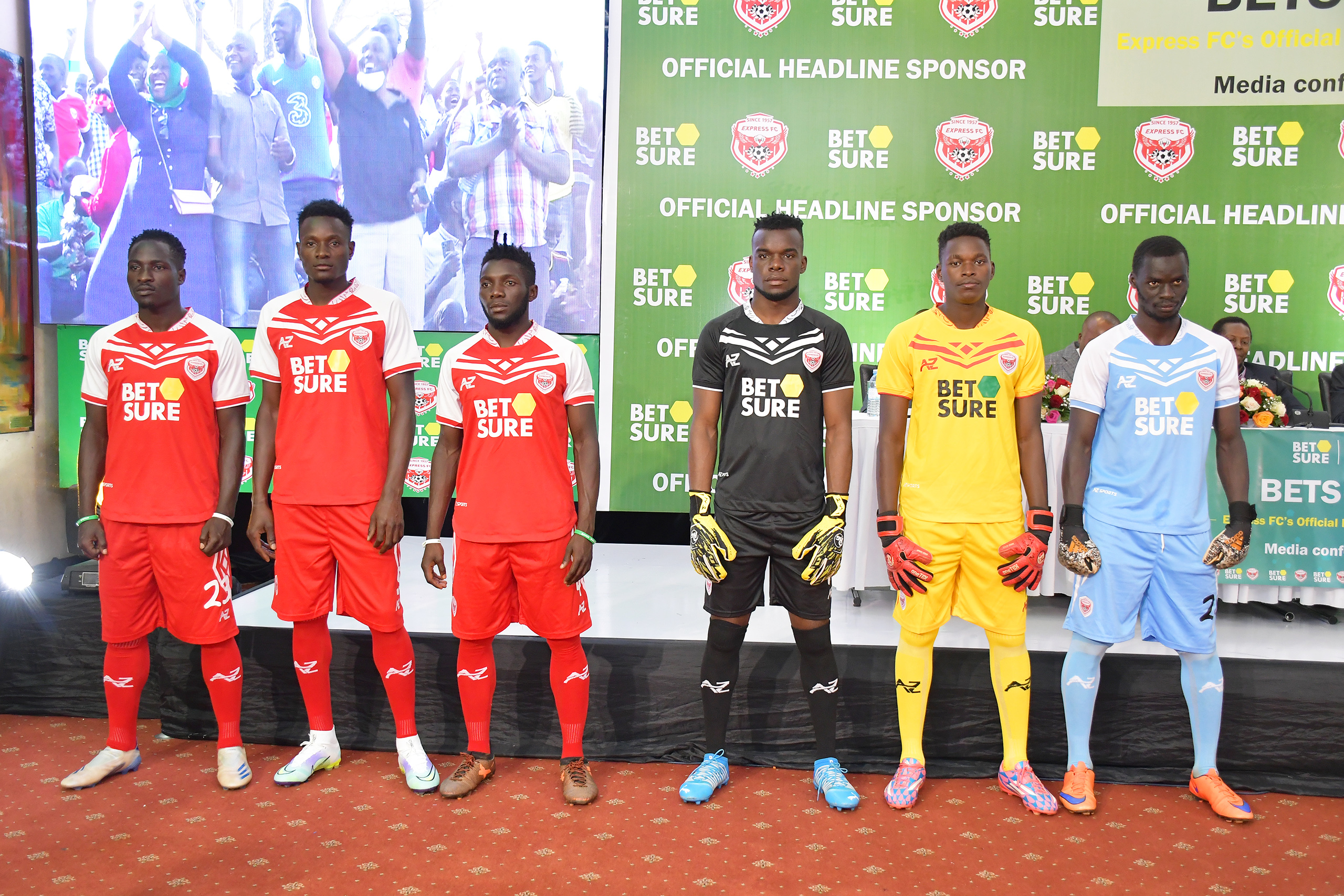
Express Football Club Players in the new jerseys clad with the BetSure logo upon their three-year sponsorship deal

=== League history ===
Express joined the Kampala and District Football League (KDFL) and by 1964 had become a leading force in the competition by winning Division One championship, with the club's leading scorer Ali Kitonsa netting 54 goals in 18 appearances. In 1968–69 the club participated in the inaugural season of the National League First Division, finishing in fourth position.

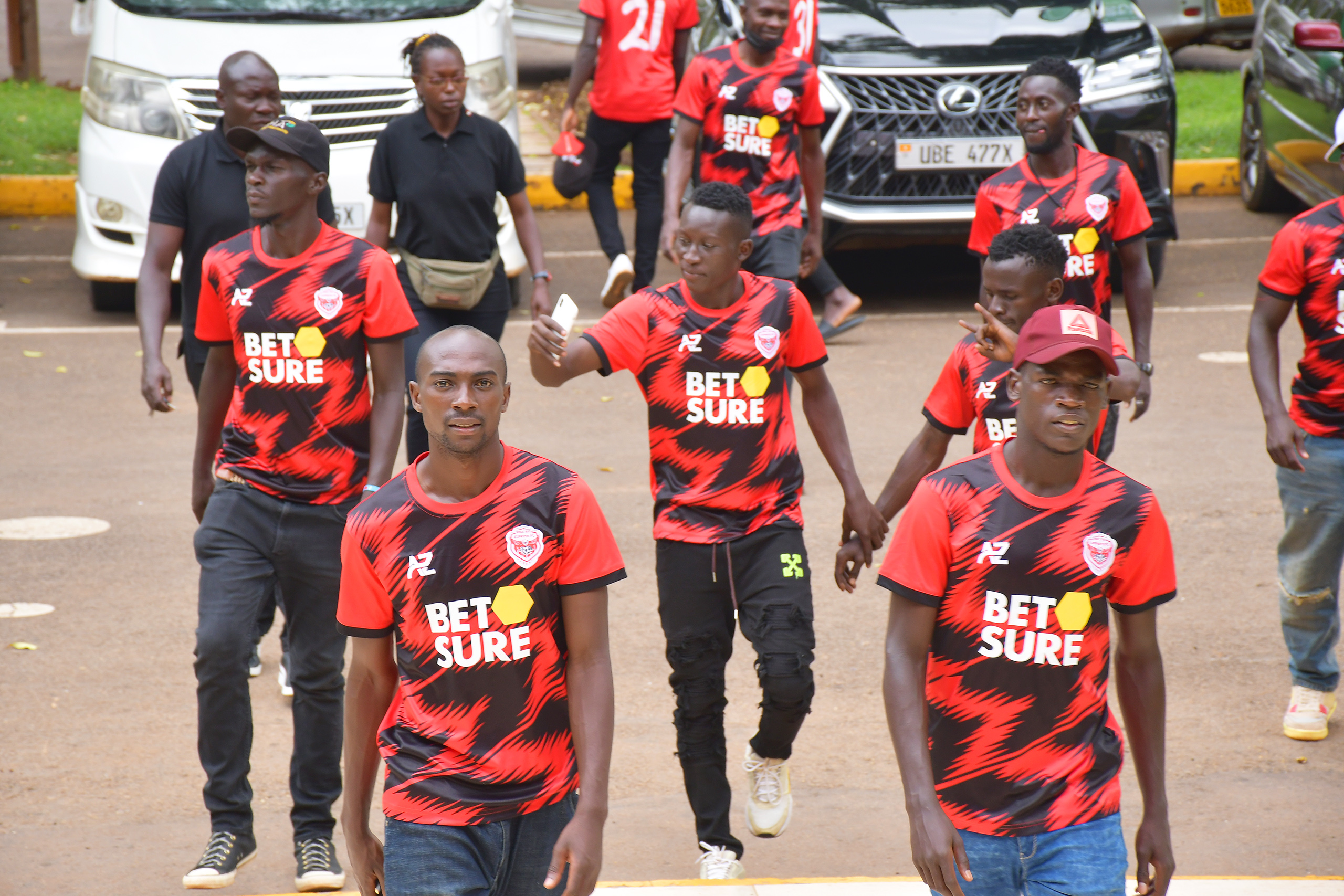
Express Football personnel dressed up in their new training kits clad with the BetSure logo, celebrating the parties' three-year sponsorship deal.

The Red Eagles won their first Uganda National League championship title in 1974 and repeated the feat the following season in 1975. In the 1977 season Express defeated the Army side Simba FC 2–0 in a crucial league match and were subsequently banned for allegedly being involving in anti-government activities, by the Governor of the Central Province, Col. Abdallah Nasur, who was unhappy about his side's loss. In 1979 the ban was lifted after the regime of Idi Amin had ended and Express returned to the National League for the 1980 season.

The Red Eagles brief interlude from National League football had lasting consequences as it gave rise to the development of its youth side Nakivubo Boys. All officials of Express turned to Nakivubo Boys and engineered their new team to become a footballing force in Uganda. Nakivubo Boys changed its name to Nakivubo Villa and then later changed its name to Sports Club Villa.

It was not until the 1993 season that Express won the Super League championship and there followed the most successful period in the club's history with further league titles in 1995 and 1996. Then a match fixing scandal involving Express' arch rival Villa interrupted this successful period. The scandal climaxed in 2002–03 season. and at the end of this season seriously tainting Ugandan football with Villa scoring 22 goals past Akol FC and then going on to take league title on goal difference from Express.

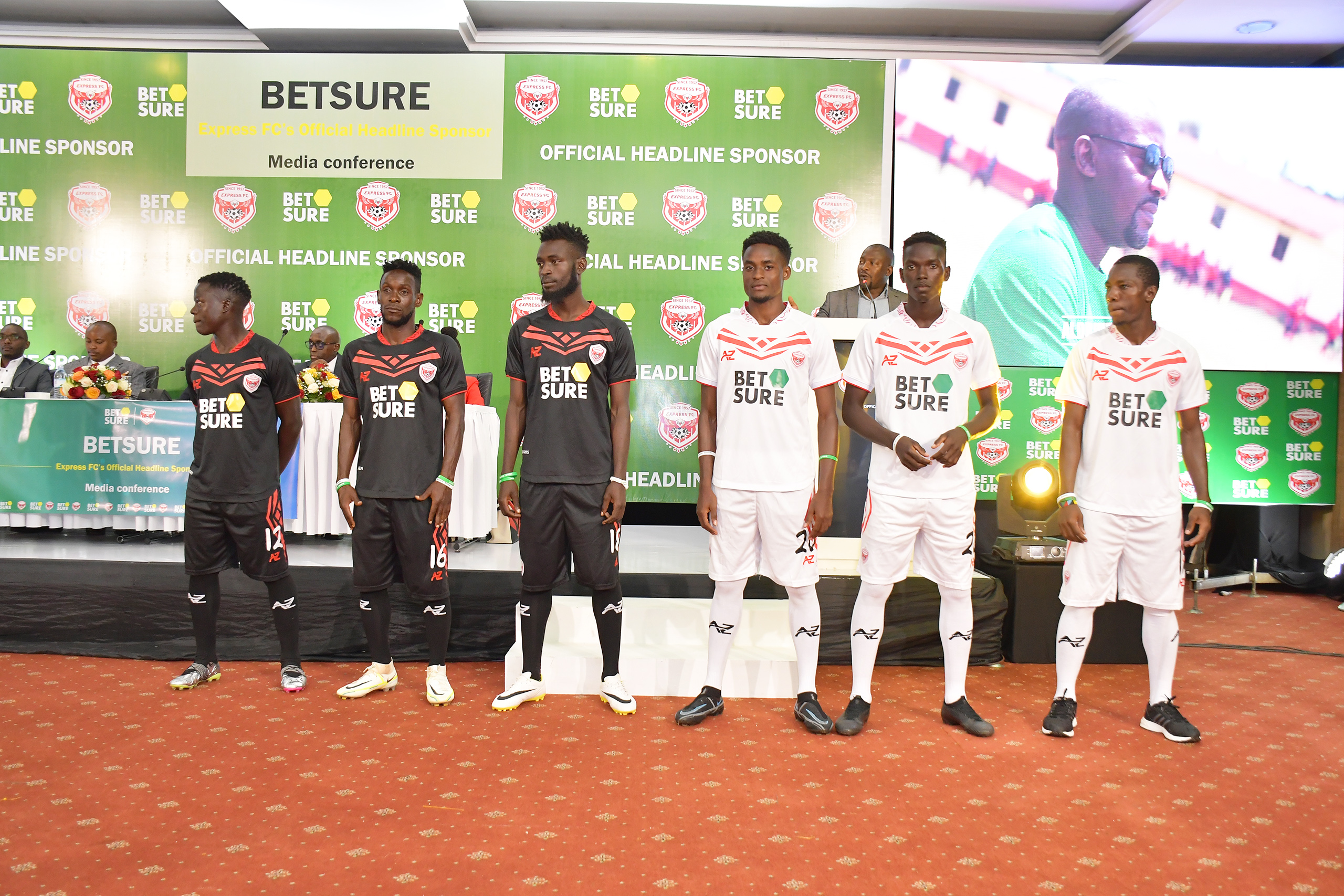
Express FC players in the new jerseys clad with Betsure logo upon their three year sponsorship deal.

Over the last ten years the club's league performance has diminished although in 2011–12 the Red Eagles secured the Super League championship title once more by finishing one point above Bunamwaya SC. The following season in 2012–13 the club finished in 11th place, their lowest top tier position. In 2018 a fundraising campaign was held in order to help save the team from relegation. Express barely survived relegation in the 2017–18 season, ensuring their spot only after defeating bottom club Masavu 1–0 in the final game of the season. Their 13th-place finish became their lowest finish in the top flight.

=== Cups ===
In contrast to their league performances, Express have been the most successful club in the Ugandan Cup winning the competition on 10 occasions in 1985, 1991, 1992, 1994, 1995, 1997, 2001, 2002–03, 2006 and 2006–07. They have also made numerous appearances in African cup competitions, including one appearance in the CAF Champions League, six appearances in the African Cup of Champions Clubs, two appearances in the CAF Confederation Cup, two appearances in the CAF Cup and five appearances in the CAF Cup Winners' Cup. In 1995 the Red Eagles reached the semi-finals of the African Cup of Champions Clubs before going out 2–1 on aggregate to South African club, Orlando Pirates, the eventual champions. In addition the club has twice finished runners-up in the CECAFA Clubs Cup, the regional club competition covering East and Central Africa, in 1994 and 1995. Another success was winning the East African Hedex Super Cup in 2001–02.

=== Record in the top tier ===
Season	Tier	League	Pos.	Pl.	W	D	L	GS	GA	Pts	
1968–69	1	Uganda National First Division	4th	14	8	2	4	32	17	18	
1969	1	Uganda National First Division	2nd	18	12	2	4	64	24	26	
1970	1	Uganda National First Division	4th	10	6	1	3	22	13	13	
1971	1	Uganda National First Division	4th	14	7	2	5	20	20	16	
1972		Competition abandoned									
1973		Competition abandoned									
1974	1	Uganda National League	1st	14	9	4	1	29	12	22	Champions
1975	1	Uganda National League	1st	18	11	5	2	35	15	27	Champions
1976	1	Uganda National League	2nd	22	16	2	4	47	14	34	
1977	1	Uganda National League									Expelled
1978–79		Not permitted to participate									
1980	1	Uganda National League	5th	30	14	6	10	46	41	34	
1981	1	Uganda National League	3rd	32	15	9	8	63	37	39	
1982	1	Uganda Super League	3rd	18	9	6	3	32	20	24	
1983	1	Uganda Super League	4th	28	16	5	7	54	39	37	
1984	1	Uganda Super League	3rd	30	14	9	7	49	34	37	
1985	1	Uganda Super League	2nd	26	19	3	4	50	23	41	
1986	1	Uganda Super League	8th	28	9	9	10	25	28	27	
1987	1	Uganda Super League	2nd	21	11	8	2	38	14	30	
1988	1	Uganda Super League									Not available
1989	1	Uganda Super League	2nd	22	14	7	1	37	21	35	
1990	1	Uganda Super League	4th	22	11	4	7	26	17	26	
1991	1	Uganda Super League	4th	20	13	5	2	39	10	31	
1992	1	Uganda Super League	2nd	26	17	7	2	43	19	41	

Season	Tier	League	Pos.	Pl.	W	D	L	GS	GA	Pts	
1993	1	Uganda Super League	1st	28	20	7	1	60	15	47	Champions
1994	1	Uganda Super League	2nd	28	20	5	3	64	14	65	
1995	1	Uganda Super League	1st	28	24	2	2	73	16	74	Champions
1996	1	Uganda Super League	1st	30	23	6	1	61	15	75	Champions
1997	1	Uganda Super League	3rd	30	22	6	2	68	18	72	
1998	1	Uganda Super League; Nile SL Serie A	2nd	21	13	5	3	44	17	44	
1999	1	Uganda Super League	2nd	38	28	8	2	85	15	92	
2000	1	Uganda Super League	3rd	30	20	5	5	53	24	65	
2001	1	Uganda Super League	3rd	28	14	7	7	37	25	49	
2002	1	Uganda Super League	2nd	28	21	3	4	62	20	66	
2002–03	1	Uganda Super League	2nd	27	23	3	1	55	9	72	
2004	1	Uganda Super League	3rd	29	16	9	4	47	20	57	
2005	1	Uganda Super League; Group C	1st	8	5	2	1	10	4	17	Qualified for KO phase: reached semi-finals
2006	1	Uganda Super League	3rd	28	15	9	4	32	16	54	
2006–07	1	Uganda Super League	9th	32	8	15	9	22	30	39	
2007–08	1	Uganda Super League	6th	34	12	15	7	30	20	51	
2008–09	1	Uganda Super League	8th	34	14	11	9	28	24	53	
2009–10	1	Uganda Super League	2nd	34	21	9	4	44	15	72	
2010–11	1	Uganda Super League	7th	26	9	10	7	18	14	37	
2011–12	1	Uganda Super League	1st	28	15	9	4	39	21	54	Champions
2012–13	1	Uganda Super League	11th	30	8	12	10	31	31	36	
2013–14	1	Uganda Super League									
2020–21	1	Uganda Premier League	1st	26	17	7	2	44	13	58	Champions

=== African cups history ===
Season	Competition	Round	Club	1st leg	2nd leg	Aggregate
1975	African Cup of Champions Clubs	First round	(Somalia) Horsed FC	1–0	0–0	1–0
1975	African Cup of Champions Clubs	Second round	(Egypt) Ghazl Al-Mehalla	1–1	0–1	1–2
1976	African Cup of Champions Clubs	First round	(Cameroon) Caïman Douala	1–0	0–1	1–1 (4–3 p.)
1976	African Cup of Champions Clubs	Second round	(Nigeria) Enugu Rangers	0–0	2–2	2–2 (ag.)
1986	African Cup Winners' Cup	First round	(Egypt) Al Ahly	0–2	1–0	1–2
1989	African Cup of Champions Clubs	First round	(Eswatini) Mbabane Highlanders FC	4–0	1–2	5–2
1989	African Cup of Champions Clubs	Second round	Zimbabwe Saints FC	1–0	0–1	1–1 (3–4 p.)
1992	African Cup Winners' Cup	First round	(Sudan) Al-Merreikh	0–1	1–1	1–2
1993	African Cup Winners' Cup	First round	(Sudan) Al-Merreikh	0–3	2–0	2–3
1994	African Cup of Champions Clubs	First round	(Egypt) Zamalek SC	disqualified	disqualified	w/o
1995	African Cup of Champions Clubs	First round	(Djibouti) Force Nationale Securité	2–0	7–0	9–0
1995	African Cup of Champions Clubs	Second round	(Cameroon) Aigle Nkongsamba	3–0	0–1	3–1
1995	African Cup of Champions Clubs	Quarter-finals	(Zimbabwe) Dynamos	0–1	2–1	2–2 (ag.)
1995	African Cup of Champions Clubs	Semi-finals	(South Africa) Orlando Pirates	0–1	1–1	1–2
1996	African Cup of Champions Clubs	Preliminary round	(Mauritius) Sunrise Flacq United	1–0	1–3	2–3
1997	CAF Champions League	Preliminary round	(Tanzania) Young Africans	0–0	1–0	1–0
1997	CAF Champions League	First round	(Zimbabwe) CAPS United	2–5	4–2	6–7
1998	African Cup Winners' Cup	First round	(Sudan) Al-Mourada	0–0	1–0	1–0
1998	African Cup Winners' Cup	Second round	(Tunisia) Espérance	1–0	0–2	1–2
1999	CAF Cup	First round	(Eritrea) Medlaw Megbi	0–1	6–0	6–1
1999	CAF Cup	Second round	(Tunisia) Etoile du Sahel	2–2	0–2	2–4
2002	African Cup Winners' Cup	First round	(Egypt) Ghazl Al-Mehalla	2–1	1–2	3–3 (1–4 p.)
2003	CAF Cup	First round	(Zambia) Green Buffaloes	1–2	1–1	2–3
2004	CAF Confederation Cup	Preliminary round	(Ethiopia) Ethiopian Bunna	2–1	0–0	2–1
2004	CAF Confederation Cup	First round	(Nigeria) Lobi Stars	1–1	0–3	1–4
2008	CAF Confederation Cup	Preliminary round	(Burundi) AS Inter Star	1–0	0–1	1–1 (5–4 p.)
2008	CAF Confederation Cup	First round	(Democratic Republic of the Congo) AS Vita Club	0–0	0–0	0–0 (2–4 p.)

== Achievements ==
- Ugandan Premier League: 7

1974, 1975, 1993, 1995, 1996, 2011–12, 2020-2021

- Ugandan Cup: 10

1985, 1991, 1992, 1994, 1995, 1997, 2001, 2002–03, 2006, 2006–07.

- East African Hedex Super Cup: 1

2001–02.

== Performance in CAF competitions ==
- CAF Champions League: 1 appearance

1997 – First round

- African Cup of Champions Clubs: 6 appearances

1975 – Second round
1976 – Second round
1989 – Second round

1990 – First round
1994 – disqualified in first round
1995 – Semi-finals

1996 – Preliminary Round

- CAF Confederation Cup: 2 appearances

2004 – First round

2008 – First round

- CAF Cup: 2 appearances

1999 – Second round

2003 – First round

- African Cup Winners' Cup: 5 appearances

1986 – First round
1992 – First round

1993 – First round
1998 – Second round

2002 – First round

== Managerial history ==
As of 14 February 2014

Since the formation of the club a total of 44 men have been appointed as head coach of Express. The coaches that have served Express are detailed below:

- (Uganda) Jolly 'Joe' Kiwanuka (1959–73)
- (Uganda) Robert Kiberu (1974–77)
- (Uganda) Ashe Mukasa (1979)
- (Uganda) John Dibya (1980)
- (Uganda) Emmanuel Nsubuga (1980–82)
- (Uganda) Henry Buyego (1983)
- (Uganda) George Mukasa (1984–85)
- (Uganda) Charles Masembe (1985–86)
- (Uganda) Dan Lutalo (1986)
- (Uganda) George Mukasa (1986)
- (Uganda) Robert Kiberu (1987–90)
- (Uganda) Billy Kizito (1990)
- (Uganda) David Otti (1990–95)
- (Uganda) Jimmy Muguwa (1995–96)
- (Serbia) Dragan Popadić (1996–97)
- (Uganda) Jimmy Muguwa (1997–98)
- (Sierra Leone) Abo Korouma (1998–99)
- (Uganda) Godfrey Nyola (1999)
- (Kenya) Rashid Shedu (1999–00)
- (Uganda) Godfrey Nyola (2000)
- (England) Eddie May (2000–01)
- (Uganda) Asumani Lubowa (2001)
- (Uganda) Godfrey Nyola (2001)
- (Uganda) Jimmy Muguwa (2002)
- (Turkey) Abdul Kadir (2002)
- (Uganda) Leo Adraa (2002–03)
- (Denmark) Jan Fray (2003)
- (Kenya) James S'ianga (2004)
- (Uganda) Leo Adraa (2004–05)
- (Uganda) Godfrey Nyola (2005)
- (Uganda) Polly Ouma (2005)
- (Uganda) George Ssimwogerere (2006)
- (Uganda) Kefa Kisala (2006)
- (Uganda) George Ssimwogerere (2006)
- (Uganda) Kefa Kisala (2006–07)
- (Uganda) Ibrahim Buwembo (2007)
- (Uganda) Kennedy Lubogo (2007)
- (Uganda) Sam Ssimbwa (2007)
- (Uganda) Polly Ouma (2007)
- (Uganda) Jimmy Muguwa (2007–08)
- (Uganda) David Otti (2008–11)
- (Uganda) Sam Ssimbwa (2010–12)
- (Uganda) Moses Basena (2012–13)
- (Uganda) Frank Anyau (2013)
- (Uganda) Sam Ssimbwa (2013)
- (Uganda) Wasswa Bossa (2014 – 14th February 2022)
- (Uganda) James Odoch (August 2022)

== See also ==
- Muteesa II Wankulukuku Stadium
- Ugandan Premier League
