= 2001 Uganda Cup =

Tournament details
- Country: Uganda

Final positions
- Champions: Express Red Eagles
- Runners-up: SC Villa

The Uganda Cup is the Uganda's main annual national football competition, organized by FUFA. It is played on a knock out basis. This annual competition is open for non league sides, registered clubs playing in all the five football divisions (Division I, II, III, Iv and V) FUFA. The Uganda Cup was first held in 1971. The winner of the Stanbic Uganda Cup represents Uganda in the CAF Confederation Cup. It is the second most prestigious competition in Ugandan football after the national league. So 2001 Uganda Cup was the 27th season of the main Ugandan football Cup. The 2001 Uganda Cup was won by Express FC after its victory against SC Villa. The competition was known as the Kakungulu Cup at the time. But the Competition is now called The Stanbic Uganda Cup.

== Overview ==
The competition was known as the Kakungulu Cup and was won by Express Red Eagles who defeated SC Villa 5-3 on penalties in the final. The score was level at 1-1 at the end of extra time. The results available for the earlier rounds are incomplete.

== Quarter-finals ==
The 4 matches in this round were played between 7 October and 8 November 2001.

Tie no	Home team	Score	Away team	
1	Mbale Heroes FC	1–0	Mityana UTODA FC	7 October 2001
2	SC Villa	5–0	Masaka United	12 October 2001
3	Express Red Eagles	1–0 (asdet)	SC Simba	7 November 2001
4	Kampala City Council FC	1–0 (asdet)	Police FC	8 November 2001

== Semi-finals ==
The semi-finals were played on 10 and 11 November 2001.

Tie no	Team 1	Score	Team 2	
1	Mbale Heroes FC	0–1 (asdet)	Express Red Eagles	10 November 2001
2	SC Villa	2–1 (asdet)	Kampala City Council FC	11 November 2001

== Final ==
The final was played on 14 November 2001. The match was tied 1-1 after extra time, and Express FC won the penalty shootout 5-3.

Tie no	Team 1	Score	Team 2	
1	SC Villa	1–1 (aet) (p. 3–5)	Express Red Eagles	14 November 2001

== See also ==
- 1988 Uganda Cup
- 1989 Uganda Cup
- 1990 Uganda Cup
- 1998 Uganda Cup
- 1999 Uganda Cup
