= 2017 Uganda Cup =

Tournament details
- Country: Uganda
- Teams: 64

Final positions
- Champions: KCCA FC
- Runners-up: Paidha Black Angels

Tournament statistics
- Top goal scorer: Derek Nsimbambi (KCCA) (8 goals)

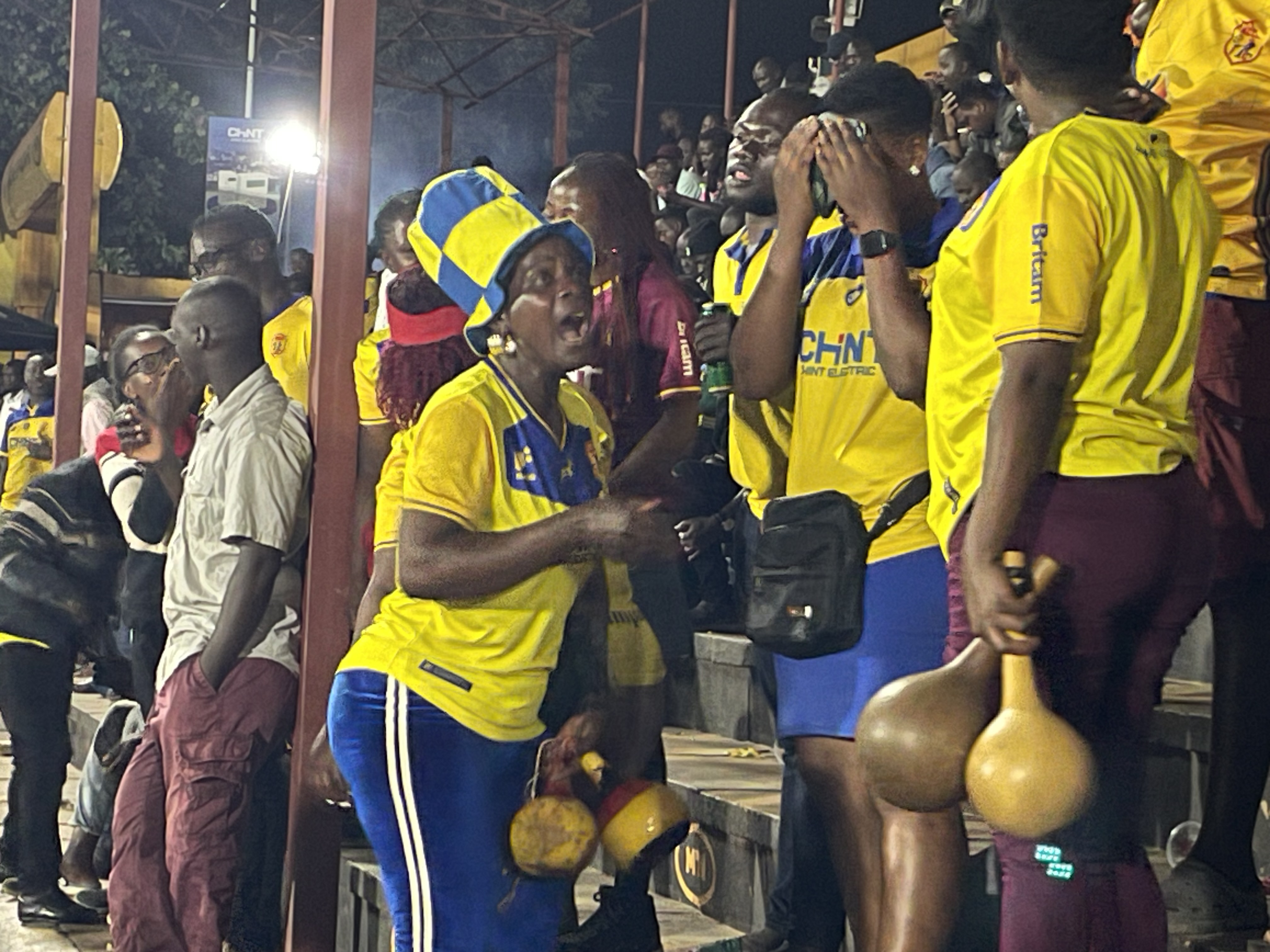
KCCA FC cheerleaders during a football match.

The 2017 Uganda Cup was the 43rd edition of the main Ugandan football cup. KCCA FC won The 2017 Uganda Cup defeating Paidha Black Angels FC 2-0 in the final which held in Arua on June 15,2017. This victory secured a historic domestic double for KCCA FC, who also won the Azam Uganda Premier League title that season.

== Final match details ==
Match Details

| Statistic | KCCA FC | Paidha Black Angels |
|---|---|---|
| Goals Scored | 2 | 0 |
| Goal Scorers | Geofrey Sserunkuma, Derrick Nsibambi | None |
| Venue | Betway Green Light stadium, Arua | - |
| Date | June 15, 2017 | |

== Format ==
The competition had 64 teams, of which the teams in the Uganda Premier League and FUFA Big League qualified automatically for the first round. The other teams were filled out through a series of regional competitions. The competition ran between January 20 and June 15.

== Overview ==
The competition was won by KCCA FC who defeated Paidha Black Angels 2-0 in the final, held in Arua. KCCA FC finished the tournament unbeaten across seven games, scoring 23 goals and conceding only five

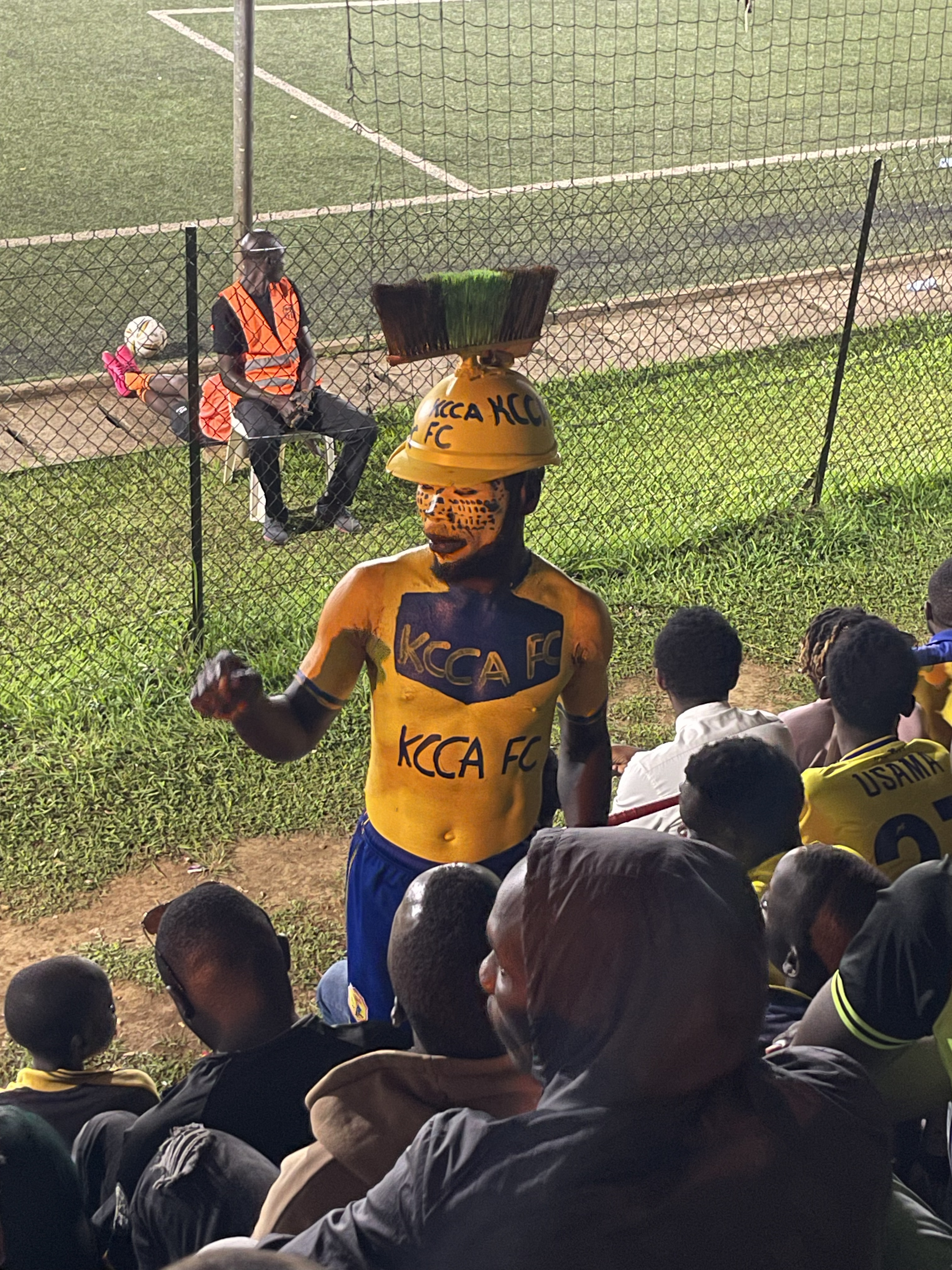
KCCA FC cheerleader during a game

== Awards ==
=== Tournament awards ===
- Top Scorer: Derrick Nsibambi (KCCA FC) with 8 goals.
- Most Valuable Player (MVP): Lawrence Bukenya (KCCA FC).
- Best Goalkeeper: Emmanuel Rubangakene (Paidha Black Angels).
- Best Coach: Mike Hillary Mutebi (KCCA FC).
- Fair Play Award: Paidha Black Angels FC.

Paidha Black Angels' Emmanuel Rubangakene won the best goalkeeper award. KCCA players managed to win most of the individual accolades including the best coach going out to Mike Hilary Mutebi, Lawrence Bukenya being the most Valuable Player and Derrick Nsibambi the top scorer with 8 goals.

== See also ==
- 2001 Uganda Cup
- 2018 Uganda Cup
- 1999 Uganda Cup
