= 2013–14 Uganda Cup =

Tournament details
- Country: Uganda

2013–14 Uganda Cup is the 40th season of the main Ugandan football Cup.

== Overview ==
The competition was previously known as the Kakungulu Cup. The winner represents Uganda in the CAF Confederations Cup in 2015.

== Preliminary rounds ==
The preliminary rounds were held in December 2013 and January 2014 and were organised on a regional basis. Results are not available for many of the matches.

=== Buganda region qualifiers ===
The Buganda region was represented by seven teams namely Seeta Utd, Mpoma Tigers FC, Bombo Utd FC, Kampala University FC, and Synergy FC (all from the Buganda Regional League) who received byes into the 'Round of 64' while Kiggogwa FC (Mityana DFA 4th Division) and Bulo Red Stars FC (Mpigi DFA 4th Division) had to play the preliminary games.

Tie no	Home team	Score	Away team
1	Bulo Red Stars FC	1–1 (p. 3–0)	Entebbe Internationals FC

Tie no	Home team	Score	Away team
1	Mukono Pirates FC	w/o	Kigoma FC

=== Kampala region qualifiers ===
The 10 teams from the Kampala region that progressed into the 'Round of 64' were Ex-Internationals, Hope Soana, Kireka United, Stegota, Life Eternal, St Mary’s, Bweyogerere, FC Barca, Coup De Grande and finally Kamwokya United FC who reached the quarterfinals of the Uganda cup last season and were handed a bye. A team of interest is Ex-Internationals FC who are led by a host of former stars on the national team. They defeated Edgars Youth at Nakivubo on spot kicks before in the next match edging out Nateete Market 1-0 to qualify for the 'Round of 64'.

==== Preliminary round 1 ====
Tie no	Home team	Score	Away team
1	Banda Stars FC	2–0	Kyokezza FC
2	Ex-Internationals FC	1–1 (p. 4–3)	Edgars Youth FC
3	Coup De Grande FC	3–0	Nabugabo Updeal FC

Tie no	Home team	Score	Away team
4	Police Young FC	1–0	Corporate XI
5	All Stars	0–1	Kansanga Half London

Other results missing.

==== Preliminary round 2 ====
Tie no	Home team	Score	Away team
1	Kyambogo	1–1 (p. 3–4)	Bweyogerere
2	Wembley	0–1	St Mary’s
3	Life Eternal	0–0 (p. 3–2)	Banda Stars
4	Mengo	0–2	Stegota
5	Kireka United	2–0	Kibuli United

Tie no	Home team	Score	Away team
6	Police Young	1–2	Hope Soana
7	Nateete Market	0–1	Ex-Internationals
8	FC Barca	0–0 (p. 3–2)	Ntinda United
9	Coup De Grande	beat	Kansanga Half London

== Round of 64 ==
The draw for the 32 matches in this round were made at FUFA house in Mengo on 31 January 2014.

7 February 2014	Sadolin Paints FC	1-1 (p. 4–5)	Police FC	Bugembe Stadium, Bugembe
4:00 PM	Julius Mutebi		Andrew Basoma

8 February 2014	Hope Soana FC	1-1 (p. 5–3)	Busia United FC	Kavumba Recreation Ground, Jinja
4:00 PM

8 February 2014	Hoima Young Stars FC	1-2	Baza Holdings FC	Boma Grounds, Hoima
4:00 PM

8 February 2014	FC Barca	1-2	Wandegeya FC	Wakiso District Headquarters, Wakiso
4:00 PM			Moses Ziwa

8 February 2014	Friends of Soccer FC	1-0	Gulu University FC	Buhinga Stadium, Fort Portal
4:00 PM

8 February 2014	Bweyogerere FC	0-1	Ndejje University FC	Police Ground, Bweyogerere
4:00 PM			Erisa Lutaya

8 February 2014	Bombo United FC	0-1	The Saints FC	Bombo Barracks, Bombo
4:00 PM			Geoffrey Buni

8 February 2014	Steel FC	2-2 (p. 2–3)	Artland Katale FC	Masindi Stadium, Masindi
4:00 PM

8 February 2014	Busia Town Council FC	2-0	Kirinya-Jinja SS FC	Busia
4:00 PM

8 February 2014	Ntonda FC	w/o	Soroti Garage FC	Ntungamo
4:00 PM

8 February 2014	Ex-Internationals FC	1-2	Hope Doves FC	Nakivubo Stadium, Kampala
4:00 PM			Samuel Bamwite Lemex Tumwebaze

9 February 2014	Kasese New Villa FC	0-0 (p. 3–4)	Lweza FC	Kasese
4:00 PM

9 February 2014	Super Boys Kaberamaido FC	0-1	Mutundwe Lions FC	Kaberamaido
4:00 PM			Paul Mukyerezi

9 February 2014	Water FC	1-2	Jinja Municipal Council FC	Nakivubo Stadium, Kampala
4:00 PM

9 February 2014	Tigers FC or Masindi United FC	v	Mbale Heroes FC	Masindi Stadium, Masindi
4:00 PM

11 February 2014	Seeta United FC	1-0	Soana FC	Seeta C/U Ground, Seeta
4:00 PM	Paddy Kwizera

11 February 2014	St Mary’s FC	1-2	Entebbe Young FC	Nabweru Sub County, Nabweru
4:00 PM			Yusuf Kinene Ndugwa Abraham

11 February 2014	Kampala University FC	w/o	Ngora Freda Carr FC	Luwero Campus, Kampala
4:00 PM

11 February 2014	Stegota FC	w/o	CRO FC	Kazo Ground, Kampala
4:00 PM

11 February 2014	Synergy FC	0-1	Masaka Local Council FC	Masaka Recreation Ground, Masaka
4:00 PM			Ronald Lukungu

11 February 2014	Coup De Grande FC	0-1	Bidco Uganda Limited FC	Gogonya, Nsambya, Kampala
4:00 PM			Masene Joshua

11 February 2014	Life Eternal FC	0-0 (p. 2–3)	Simba FC	Busega Community, Kampala
4:00 PM

11 February 2014	Bulo Red Stars FC	0-1	Bright Stars FC	Bulo Town, Mpigi District
4:00 PM			Medi Kakeeto

14 February 2014	Kireka United FC	2-0	Kiira Young FC	Police Ground, Bweyogerere
4:00 PM	Fred Okot Sekamatte Swaibu

14 February 2014	Kigoogwa United FC	1-1 (p. 4–5)	Proline FC	Ssaza Ground, Mityana
4:00 PM

14 February 2014	Kataka FC	0-2	SC Villa	Mbale
4:00 PM

14 February 2014	Mpoma Tigers FC	2-3	Express FC	Nakifuma Town
4:00 PM			Wily Kavuma Ogwang Julius; Ivan Sserunkuma

14 February 2014	Telestar FC	1-2	Uganda Revenue Authority FC	Mbale
4:00 PM			Oscar Agaba James Kasibante

18 February 2014	Rwenshama FC	1-3	Vipers FC	Ssaza Ground, Mityana
4:00 PM

21 February 2014	Kamwokya United FC	v	Kampala Capital City Authority FC	Kololo SS, Kampala
4:00 PM

4 March 2014	Kumi University FC	v	Village Club California FC	Kumi University, Kumi
4:00 PM

11 March 2014	Amuria Crane City FC	v	SC Victoria University	Amuria
4:00 PM
