= 2000 Uganda Cup =

Tournament details
- Country: Uganda

Final positions
- Champions: SC Villa
- Runners-up: Military Police FC

2000 Uganda Cup was the 26th season of the main Ugandan football Cup.

== Overview ==
The competition was known as the Kakungulu Cup and was won by SC Villa who beat Military Police FC 1–0 in the final. The results available for the earlier rounds are incomplete.

== Quarter-finals ==
The 4 matches in this round were played between 13 October and 15 October 2000.

Tie no	Home team	Score	Away team	
1	UTODA FC	1–1 (p. 3–2)	Mbale Heroes FC	13 October 2000
2	Nile Breweries FC	2–3	Masaka Local Council FC	14 October 2000
3	Kampala City Council FC	1–1 (p. 3–4)	Military Police FC	15 October 2000
4	SC Villa	0–0 (p. 6–5)	SCOUL FC	15 October 2000

== Semi-finals ==
The semi-finals were played on 3 November 2000.

Tie no	Team 1	Score	Team 2	
1	Military Police FC	2–0	Masaka Local Council FC	3 November 2000
2	UTODA FC	0–6	SC Villa	3 November 2000

== Final ==
The final was played on 21 January 2001.

Tie no	Team 1	Score	Team 2	
1	SC Villa	1–0	Military Police FC	21 January 2001
