= 2018 Uganda Cup =

Tournament details
- Country: Uganda
- Teams: 64

Final positions
- Champions: KCCA FC
- Runners-up: Vipers SC

Tournament statistics
- Top goal scorer: Patrick Kadu (KCCA)

Awards
- Best player: Allan Okello (KCCA)

Uganda Cup 2018 was the 44th season of the main Ugandan football Cup.

The competition was won by KCCA FC who defeated Vipers SC 1–0 in the final.

== Round of 64 ==
[Jan-Feb]

SC Bronken 1-3 Vipers SC

SC Villa Jogoo 2-0 Hope Doves

Lungujja Galaxy 2-2 Mbarara City FC [2-3 pen]

Mbarara FC 0-4 KCCA FC

Greaters Masaka 0-2 Police FC

Seeta United FC 1-0 Kinrinya Jinja S.S.

Onduparaka FC w/o Light S.S.

Ntoda 0-3 Soana FC

Express FC 6-0 Kachumbala Rock Stars

Vura Stars 0-1 Bright Stars FC

Proline FC w/o Nkambi Coffee

Masavu FC w/o Jinja Municipal Council Hippos

Sun City 0-1 BUL FC

Busia Fisheries 0-1 UPDF FC

URA FC 0-1 Kampala Junior Team FC

City Lads 0-3 Kira United FC

Bugwere 0-2 Ndejje University FC

Ntinda United FC 2-0 Young Elephants

Simba FC 0-0 Paidha Black Angels [7-6 pen]

Nabitende FC 0-0 Bumate [4-3 pen]

Pallisa United 0-5 Nymityobola FC

Kitara FC 1-1 Koboko Rising Stars [7-6 pen]

Amuka Bright Stars FC 3-1 Saviours FC

Synergy FC w/o Bukeda Town Council

Doves All Stars FC w/o Agape

Rushere FC 2-0 Kamuli Park

Kabale Sharp 1-2 Busula FC

Kansai Plascon FC 6-1 Buitaba Red Stars

Lira United FC w/o Kitaka

Kireka United 1-1 Arua Tigers FC [3-4 pen]

Kyetume 0-0 Luwero United FC [3-4 pen]

== Round of 32 ==
[Feb 17]

Vipers SC 3-1 Police FC

UPDF FC 1-1 Rushere FC [4-3 pen]

Kansai Plascon FC 2-0 Doves All Stars FC

Kitara FC 2-0 Express FC

Soana FC 1-1 Ondurapaka FC [4-3 pen]

Water FC 0-1 Seeta United FC

Mbarara City FC 3-0 Nabitende FC

Simba FC 1-2 KCCA FC

[Feb 22]

Synergy FC 1-0 Masavu FC

Kira United FC 2-1 Lira United FC

Ndejje University FC 4-1 Ntinda United FC

Proline FC 2-1 Luwero United FC

Kampala Junior Team 1-0 Arua Tigers FC

Busula FC 4-1 Amuka Bright Stars FC

[Feb 27]

BUL FC 1-0 Nymityobola FC

[Mar 7]

SC Villa 2-0 Bright Stars FC

== Round of 16 ==
[Mar 21]

Soana FC 2-2 KCCA FC [3-4 pen]

Kampala Junior Team 2-1 BUL FC

Busula FC 1-2 Synergy FC

UPDF FC 0-0 Proline FC [2-4 pen]

[Mar 22]

Mbarara City FC 0-3 Kansai Plascon FC

Ndejje University FC 0-1 SC Villa

Kitara FC 4-0 Seeta United FC

Kira United 0-1 Vipers SC

== Quarter-finals ==
[Apr 21]

Kitara FC 0-1 KCCA FC

[Apr 22]

Kampala Junior Team 0-3 SC Villa

[Apr 28]

Synergy FC 1-0 Proline FC

[Apr 29]

Kansai Plascon FC 0-1 Vipers SC

== Semi-finals ==
First Legs

[May 27]

SC Villa 0-0 Vipers SC

[May 28]

Synergy FC 0-1 KCCA FC

Second Legs

[May 31]

KCCA FC 9-0 Synergy FC

[Jun 5]

Vipers SC 1-0 SC Villa

== Final ==
[Jun 9, Emokori Playground, Bukedea District]

KCCA FC 1-0 Vipers SC

[Julius Poloto 42]
