= List of CAF Champions League top scorers =

The CAF Champions League, known for sponsorship purposes as the TotalEnergies CAF Champions League and formerly the African Cup of Champions Clubs, is an annual club football competition organized by the Confederation of African Football (CAF) and contested by top-division African clubs. It is the most prestigious club competition in African football.

== Top scorers by season ==
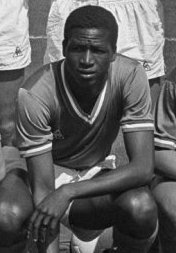
Malian Salif Keïta, the top scorer of the inaugural season in tournament history.

Year	Footballer	Club	Goals
African Cup of Champions Clubs era
1964–65	(Mali) Salif Keïta	(Mali) Stade Malien	3
1966	(Mali) Salif Keïta	(Mali) Stade Malien	14
1967	(Egypt) Badawi Abdel Fattah; (Egypt) Ahmed El-Qazzaz; (Ghana) Osei Kofi; (Democratic Republic of the Congo) Pierre Kalala; (Democratic Republic of the Congo) Leonard Saidi; (Democratic Republic of the Congo) Kamunda Tshinabu	(Egypt) Al Olympi; (Egypt) Al Olympi; (Ghana) Asante Kotoko; (Democratic Republic of the Congo) TP Englebert; (Democratic Republic of the Congo) TP Englebert; (Democratic Republic of the Congo) TP Englebert	2
1968	(Democratic Republic of the Congo) Pierre Kalala	(Democratic Republic of the Congo) TP Englebert	7
1969	(Egypt) Ali Abo Greisha	(Egypt) Ismaily	7
1970	(Democratic Republic of the Congo) Pierre Kalala	(Democratic Republic of the Congo) TP Englebert	4
1971	(Ghana) Cecil Jones Attuquayefio	(Ghana) Accra Great Olympics	6
1972	(Zambia) Godfrey Chitalu	(Zambia) Kabwe Warriors	13
1973	(Guinea) Chérif Souleymane	(Guinea) Hafia FC	5
1974	(Republic of the Congo) Paul Moukila	(Republic of the Congo) CARA Brazzaville	10
1975	(Guinea) N'Jo Léa	(Guinea) Hafia FC	4
1976	(Algeria) Abdesslem Bousri	(Algeria) MC Alger	5
1977	(Egypt) Mahmoud El Khatib	(Egypt) Al Ahly	4
1978	(Guinea) Seydouba Bangoura; (Democratic Republic of the Congo) Mayanga Maku	(Guinea) Hafia FC; (Democratic Republic of the Congo) AS Vita Club	2
1979	(Tanzania) Ally Thuwen	(Tanzania) Simba SC	3
1980	(Cameroon) Jean Manga Onguéné	(Cameroon) Canon Yaoundé	9
1981	(Egypt) Mahmoud El Khatib	(Egypt) Al Ahly	6
1982	(Egypt) Mahmoud El Khatib	(Egypt) Al Ahly	6
1983	(Egypt) Mahmoud El Khatib	(Egypt) Al Ahly	6
1984	(Nigeria) Felix Owolabi	(Nigeria) Shooting Stars	5
1985	(Morocco) Saad Dahane (Morocco) Abdellah Haidamou (Morocco) Abderrazak Khairi (Algeria) Mokhtar Chibani	(Morocco) FAR Rabat (Morocco) FAR Rabat (Morocco) FAR Rabat (Algeria) GCR Mascara	4
1986	(Egypt) Gamal Abdel Hamid	(Egypt) Zamalek	7
1987	(Egypt) Mahmoud El Khatib	(Egypt) Al Ahly	5
1988	(Morocco) Abdeslam Laghrissi	(Morocco) FAR Rabat	7
1989	(Algeria) Mourad Meziane	(Algeria) MC Oran	5
1990	(Algeria) Nacer Bouiche	(Algeria) JS Kabylie	7
1991	(Tunisia) Faouzi Rouissi (Tunisia) Adel Sellimi	(Tunisia) Club Africain	6
1992	(Zambia) Kenneth Malitoli	(Zambia) Nkana	6
1993	(Egypt) Ayman Mansour	(Egypt) Zamalek	5
1994	(Nigeria) Anthony Nwaigwe	(Nigeria) Iwuanyanwu Nationale	7
1995	(Ghana) Kofi Deblah; (Ivory Coast) Sékou Bamba	(Ghana) Obuasi Goldfields; (Ivory Coast) ASEC Mimosas	4
1996	(Egypt) Ahmed El-Kass; (Egypt) Ayman Mansour; (Egypt) Tarek Mostafa; (Egypt) Mohamed Sabry; (Rwanda) Julien Ndagano; (Tunisia) Skander Souayah	(Egypt) Zamalek; (Egypt) Zamalek; (Egypt) Zamalek; (Egypt) Zamalek; (Rwanda) APR FC; (Tunisia) CS Sfaxien	2
Champions League era
1997	(Togo) Kossi Noutsoudje	(Ghana) Obuasi Goldfields	7
1998	(Ethiopia) Aseged Tesfaye; (Morocco) Reda Ereyahi	(Ethiopia) Ethiopian Coffee; (Morocco) Raja CA	6
1999	(Egypt) Hossam Hassan	(Egypt) Al Ahly	6
2000	(Ghana) Emmanuel Osei Kuffour	(Ghana) Accra Hearts of Oak	10
2001	(Democratic Republic of the Congo) Kapela Mbiyavanga	(Angola) Petro Atlético	9
2002	(Egypt) Ahmed Belal; (Ivory Coast) Antonin Koutouan; (Morocco) Hicham Aboucherouane	(Egypt) Al Ahly; (Ivory Coast) ASEC Mimosas; (Morocco) Raja CA	7
2003	(Mali) Dramane Traoré	(Egypt) Ismaily	8
2004	(Mali) Mamadou Diallo	(Algeria) USM Alger	10
2005	(Egypt) Mohamed Barakat; (Ghana) Joetex Frimpong	(Egypt) Al Ahly; (Nigeria) Enyimba	7
2006	(Egypt) Mohamed Aboutrika	(Egypt) Al Ahly	8
2007	(Democratic Republic of the Congo) Trésor Mputu	(Democratic Republic of the Congo) TP Mazembe	9
2008	(Nigeria) Stephen Worgu	(Nigeria) Enyimba	13
2009	(Democratic Republic of the Congo) Dioko Kaluyituka	(Democratic Republic of the Congo) TP Mazembe	8
2010	(Nigeria) Michael Eneramo	(Tunisia) Espérance de Tunis	8
2011	(Zimbabwe) Edward Sadomba	(Sudan) Al-Hilal	7
2012	(Ghana) Emmanuel Clottey	(Ghana) Berekum Chelsea	12
2013	(Cameroon) Alexis Yougouda Kada	(Cameroon) Coton Sport	7
2014	(Algeria) El Hedi Belameiri; (Tunisia) Haythem Jouini; (Democratic Republic of the Congo) Ndombe Mubele; (Tanzania) Mrisho Ngasa	(Algeria) ES Sétif; (Tunisia) Espérance de Tunis; (Democratic Republic of the Congo) AS Vita Club; (Tanzania) Young Africans	6
2015	(Sudan) Bakri Al-Madina; (Tanzania) Mbwana Samatta	(Sudan) Al-Merrikh; (Democratic Republic of the Congo) TP Mazembe	7
2016	(Nigeria) Mfon Udoh	(Nigeria) Enyimba	9
2017	(Tunisia) Taha Yassine Khenissi; (Ethiopia) Saladin Said	(Tunisia) Espérance de Tunis; (Ethiopia) Saint George	7
2018	(Tunisia) Anice Badri	(Tunisia) Espérance de Tunis	8
2018–19	(Libya) Moataz Al-Mehdi	(Libya) Al-Nasr	7
2019–20	(Democratic Republic of the Congo) Jackson Muleka	(Democratic Republic of the Congo) TP Mazembe	7
2020–21	(Egypt) Mohamed Sherif	(Egypt) Al Ahly	6
2021–22	(Brazil) Tiago Azulão	(Angola) Petro Atlético	6
2022–23	(Egypt) Mahmoud Kahraba; (Namibia) Peter Shalulile	(Egypt) Al Ahly; (South Africa) Mamelodi Sundowns	6
2023–24	(Ivory Coast) Sankara Karamoko	(Ivory Coast) ASEC Mimosas	4
2024–25	(Democratic Republic of the Congo) Fiston Mayele	(Egypt) Pyramids	6
2025–26	(Egypt) Trézéguet	(Egypt) Al Ahly	6

=== By player ===
Player	Titles	Seasons
(Egypt) Mahmoud El Khatib	5	1977, 1981, 1982, 1983, 1987
(Democratic Republic of the Congo) Pierre Kalala Mukendi	3	1967, 1968, 1970
(Mali) Salif Keïta	2	1964–65, 1966
(Egypt) Ayman Mansour	2	1993, 1996

=== By club ===
Club	Titles	Seasons
(Egypt) Al Ahly SC	12	1977, 1981, 1982, 1983, 1987, 1999, 2002, 2005, 2006, 2020–21, 2022–23, 2025–26
(Democratic Republic of the Congo) TP Mazembe	7	1967, 1968, 1970, 2007, 2009, 2015, 2019–20
(Tunisia) Espérance de Tunis	4	2010, 2014, 2017, 2018
(Egypt) Zamalek SC	3	1986, 1993, 1996
(Guinea) Hafia FC	3	1973, 1975, 1978
(Nigeria) Enyimba F.C.	3	2005, 2008, 2016
