= List of African Cup Winners' Cup finals =

- Founded: 1975
- Abolished: 2004
- Region: Africa (CAF)
- Teams: 32 (first round); 2 (finalists)
- Last champions: (Tunisia) ES Sahel (2nd title)
- Most championships: (Egypt) Al Ahly (4 titles)

The African Cup Winners' Cup was a seasonal association football competition established in 1975 and abolished and merged with the CAF Cup to form the CAF Confederations Cup in 2004. The African Cup Winners' Cup was open to the winning clubs of domestic cups in CAF-affiliated nations.

== List of finals ==
Year	Home team	Score	Away team	Venue	Attendance
1975	(Ivory Coast) Stella Club d'Adjamé	0 – 1	(Cameroon) Tonnerre Yaoundé		
1975	(Cameroon) Tonnerre Yaoundé	4 – 1	(Ivory Coast) Stella Club d'Adjamé	Stade Omnisport, Yaoundé	
1975	Tonnerre Yaoundé won 5 – 1 on aggregate				
1976; Details	(Nigeria) Shooting Stars FC	4 – 1	(Cameroon) Tonnerre Yaoundé	Surulere Stadium, Lagos	
1976; Details	(Cameroon) Tonnerre Yaoundé	1 – 0	(Nigeria) Shooting Stars FC	Stade Omnisport, Yaoundé	
1976; Details	Shooting Stars FC won 4 – 2 on aggregate				
1977; Details	(Nigeria) Enugu Rangers	4 – 1	(Cameroon) Canon Yaoundé		
1977; Details	(Cameroon) Canon Yaoundé	1 – 1	(Nigeria) Enugu Rangers	Stade Omnisport, Yaoundé	
1977; Details	Enugu Rangers won 5 – 2 on aggregate				
1978; Details	(Algeria) MA Hussein Dey	1 – 3	(Guinea) Horoya AC	Stade 20 Aout, Algiers	
1978; Details	(Guinea) Horoya AC	2 – 1	(Algeria) MA Hussein Dey	Stade du 28 Septembre, Conakry	
1978; Details	Horoya AC won 5 – 2 on aggregate				
1979; Details	(Kenya) Gor Mahia FC	0 – 2	(Cameroon) Canon Yaoundé	Jogoo Road Stadium, Nairobi	
1979; Details	(Cameroon) Canon Yaoundé	6 – 0	(Kenya) Gor Mahia FC	Stade Omnisport, Yaoundé	
1979; Details	Canon Yaoundé won 8 – 0 on aggregate				
1980; Details	(Ivory Coast) Africa Sports National	1 – 3	(Zaire) TP Mazembe	Stade Félix Houphouët-Boigny, Abidjan	
1980; Details	(Zaire) TP Mazembe	1 – 0	(Ivory Coast) Africa Sports National	Stade de la Kenya, Lubumbashi	
1980; Details	TP Mazembe won 4 – 1 on aggregate				
1981; Details	(Cameroon) Union Douala	0 – 0	(Nigeria) Stationery Stores FC	Stade Omnisport, Yaoundé	
1981; Details	(Nigeria) Stationery Stores FC	1 – 2	(Cameroon) Union Douala	Surulere Stadium, Lagos	
1981; Details	Union Douala won 2 – 1 on aggregate				
1982; Details	(Zambia) Power Dynamos FC	0 – 2	(Egypt) El Mokawloon SC	Arthur Davies Stadium, Kitwe	
1982; Details	(Egypt) El Mokawloon SC	2 – 0	(Zambia) Power Dynamos FC	Cairo International Stadium, Cairo	
1982; Details	El Mokawloon SC won 4 – 0 on aggregate				
1983; Details	(Togo) OC Agaza	0 – 1	(Egypt) El Mokawloon SC	Stade Agoè-Nyivé, Lomé	
1983; Details	(Egypt) El Mokawloon SC	0 – 0	(Togo) OC Agaza	Cairo International Stadium, Cairo	
1983; Details	El Mokawloon SC won 1 – 0 on aggregate				
1984; Details	(Egypt) Al Ahly	1 – 0	(Cameroon) Canon Yaoundé	Cairo International Stadium, Cairo	100,000
1984; Details	(Cameroon) Canon Yaoundé	1 – 0 (2 - 4 Pen)	(Egypt) Al Ahly	Stade Omnisport, Yaoundé	
1984; Details	Al Ahly won 4 – 2 on penalties (1 – 1 on aggregate)				
1985; Details	(Egypt) Al Ahly	2 – 0	(Nigeria) Leventis United	Cairo International Stadium, Cairo	
1985; Details	(Nigeria) Leventis United	1 – 0	(Egypt) Al Ahly	Liberty Stadium, Ibadan	
1985; Details	Al Ahly won 2 – 1 on aggregate				
1986; Details	(Egypt) Al Ahly	3 – 0	(Gabon) AS Sogara	Cairo International Stadium, Cairo	
1986; Details	(Gabon) AS Sogara	2 – 0	(Egypt) Al Ahly	Stade Pierre Claver Divounguy, Port-Gentil	
1986; Details	Al Ahly won 3 – 2 on aggregate				
1987; Details	(Tunisia) ES Tunis	2 – 2	(Kenya) Gor Mahia FC	Stade El Menzah, Tunis	
1987; Details	(Kenya) Gor Mahia FC	1 – 1	(Tunisia) ES Tunis	Moi International Sports Center, Kasarani, Nairobi	
1987; Details	Gor Mahia FC finish 3 – 3 on aggregate but won by the away goal				
1988; Details	(Nigeria) Ranchers Bees FC	0 – 0	(Tunisia) CA Bizerte	Ranchers Bees Stadium, Kaduna	
1988; Details	(Tunisia) CA Bizerte	1 – 0	(Nigeria) Ranchers Bees FC	Stade 15 Octobre, Bizerte	
1988; Details	CA Bizerte won 1 – 0 on aggregate				
1989; Details	(Sudan) Al-Merrikh SC	1 – 0	(Nigeria) Esan F.C.	Al-Merrikh Stadium, Omdurman	
1989; Details	(Nigeria) Esan F.C.	0 – 0	(Sudan) Al-Merrikh SC	Samuel Ogbemudia Stadium, Uromi	
1989; Details	Al-Merrikh SC won 1 – 0 on aggregate				
1990; Details	(Nigeria) BCC Lions	3 – 0	(Tunisia) Club Africain	Surulere Stadium, Lagos	
1990; Details	(Tunisia) Club Africain	1 – 1	(Nigeria) BCC Lions	Stade El Menzah, Tunis	
1990; Details	BCC Lions won 4 – 1 on aggregate				
1991; Details	(Nigeria) BCC Lions	3 – 2	(Zambia) Power Dynamos FC	Surulere Stadium, Lagos	30,000
1991; Details	(Zambia) Power Dynamos FC	3 – 1	(Nigeria) BCC Lions	Independence Stadium, Lusaka	
1991; Details	Power Dynamos FC won 5 – 4 on aggregate				
1992; Details	(Burundi) Vital'O FC	1 – 1	(Ivory Coast) Africa Sports National	Prince Louis Rwagasore Stadium, Bujumbura	
1992; Details	(Ivory Coast) Africa Sports National	4 – 0	(Burundi) Vital'O FC	Stade Félix Houphouët-Boigny, Abidjan	
1992; Details	Africa Sports National won 5 – 1 on aggregate				
1993; Details	(Ivory Coast) Africa Sports National	1 – 1	(Egypt) Al Ahly	Stade Félix Houphouët-Boigny, Abidjan	
1993; Details	(Egypt) Al Ahly	1 – 0	(Ivory Coast) Africa Sports National	Cairo International Stadium, Cairo	
1993; Details	Al Ahly won 2 – 1 on aggregate				
1994; Details	(Zaire) DC Motema Pembe	2 – 2	Kenya Breweries FC	Stade des Martyrs, Kinshasa	
1994; Details	Kenya Breweries FC	0 – 3	(Zaire) DC Motema Pembe	Moi International Sports Centre, Nairobi	
1994; Details	DC Motema Pembe won 5 – 2 on aggregate				
1995; Details	(Nigeria) Julius Berger FC	1 – 1	(Algeria) JS Kabylie	Lagos National Stadium, Surulere	
1995; Details	(Algeria) JS Kabylie	2 – 1	(Nigeria) Julius Berger FC	Stade 5 Juillet, Algiers	45,000
1995; Details	JS Kabylie won 3 – 2 on aggregate				
1996; Details	(Zaire) AC Sodigraf	0 – 0	(Egypt) El Mokawloon SC	Stade des Martyrs, Kinshasa	10,000
1996; Details	(Egypt) El Mokawloon SC	4 – 0	(Zaire) AC Sodigraf	Cairo International Stadium, Cairo	40,000
1996; Details	El Mokawloon SC won 4 – 0 on aggregate				
1997; Details	(Tunisia) ÉS Sahel	2 – 0	(Morocco) FAR Rabat	Stade Olympique de Sousse, Sousse	
1997; Details	(Morocco) FAR Rabat	1 – 0	(Tunisia) ÉS Sahel	Stade Moulay Abdellah, Rabat	45,000
1997; Details	ÉS Sahel won 2 – 1 on aggregate				
1998; Details	(Tunisia) ES Tunis	3 – 1	(Angola) Primeiro de Agosto	Stade El Menzah, Tunis	35,000
1998; Details	(Angola) Primeiro de Agosto	1 – 1	(Tunisia) ES Tunis	Estádio da Cidadela, Luanda	
1998; Details	ES Tunis won 4 – 2 on aggregate				
1999; Details	(Ivory Coast) Africa Sports National	1 – 0	(Tunisia) Club Africain	Stade Félix Houphouët-Boigny, Abidjan	
1999; Details	(Tunisia) Club Africain	1 – 1	(Ivory Coast) Africa Sports National	Stade El Menzah, Tunis	
1999; Details	Africa Sports National won 2 – 1 on aggregate				
2000; Details	(Egypt) Zamalek SC	4 – 1	(Cameroon) Canon Yaoundé	Cairo International Stadium, Cairo	50,000
2000; Details	(Cameroon) Canon Yaoundé	2 – 0	(Egypt) Zamalek SC	Stade Ahmadou Ahidjo, Yaoundé	60,000
2000; Details	Zamalek SC won 4 – 3 on aggregate				
2001; Details	(Angola) Interclube	1 – 1	(South Africa) Kaizer Chiefs	Estádio dos Coqueiros, Luanda	
2001; Details	(South Africa) Kaizer Chiefs	1 – 0	(Angola) Interclube	Ellis Park Stadium, Johannesburg	
2001; Details	Kaizer Chiefs won 2 – 1 on aggregate				
2002; Details	(Morocco) Wydad AC Casablanca	1 – 0	(Ghana) Asante Kotoko	Stade Mohamed V, Casablanca	35,000
2002; Details	(Ghana) Asante Kotoko	2 – 1	(Morocco) Wydad AC	Baba Yara Stadium, Kumasi	50,000
2002; Details	Wydad AC finish 2 – 2 on aggregate but won by the away goal				
2003	(Nigeria) Julius Berger FC	2 – 0	(Tunisia) ÉS Sahel	MKO Abiola Stadium, Abeokuta	
2003	(Tunisia) ÉS Sahel	3 – 0	(Nigeria) Julius Berger FC	Stade Olympique de Sousse, Sousse	28,000
2003	ÉS Sahel won 3 – 2 on aggregate				

== Performances ==
=== By club ===
Club	Winners	Runners-up	Years won	Years runners-up
(Egypt) Al Ahly	4	0	1984, 1985, 1986, 1993	—
(Egypt) El Mokawloon SC	3	0	1982, 1983, 1996	—
(Ivory Coast) Africa Sports National	2	2	1992, 1999	1980, 1993
(Tunisia) ÉS Sahel	2	0	1997, 2003	—
(Cameroon) Canon Yaoundé	1	3	1979	1977, 1984, 2000
(Cameroon) Tonnerre Yaoundé	1	1	1975	1976
(Kenya) Gor Mahia FC	1	1	1987	1979
(Nigeria) BCC Lions	1	1	1990	1991
(Zambia) Power Dynamos FC	1	1	1991	1982
(Tunisia) ES Tunis	1	1	1998	1987
(Nigeria) Shooting Stars FC	1	0	1976	—
(Nigeria) Enugu Rangers	1	0	1977	—
(Guinea) Horoya AC	1	0	1978	—
(Democratic Republic of the Congo) TP Mazembe	1	0	1980	—
(Cameroon) Union Douala	1	0	1981	—
(Tunisia) CA Bizerte	1	0	1988	—
(Sudan) Al-Merrikh SC	1	0	1989	—
(Democratic Republic of the Congo) DC Motema Pembe	1	0	1994	—
(Algeria) JS Kabylie	1	0	1995	—
(Egypt) Zamalek SC	1	0	2000	—
(South Africa) Kaizer Chiefs FC	1	0	2001	—
(Morocco) Wydad AC Casablanca	1	0	2002	—
(Tunisia) Club Africain	0	2	—	1990, 1999
(Nigeria) Julius Berger FC	0	2	—	1995, 2003
(Ivory Coast) Stella Club d'Adjamé	0	1	—	1975
(Algeria) NA Hussein Dey	0	1	—	1978
(Nigeria) Stationery Stores F.C.	0	1	—	1981
(Togo) OC Agaza	0	1	—	1983
(Nigeria) Leventis United	0	1	—	1985
(Gabon) AS Sogara	0	1	—	1986
(Nigeria) Ranchers Bees FC	0	1	—	1988
(Nigeria) Esan F.C.	0	1	—	1989
(Burundi) Vital'O FC	0	1	—	1992
Kenya Breweries FC	0	1	—	1994
(Democratic Republic of the Congo) AC Sodigraf	0	1	—	1996
(Morocco) FAR Rabat	0	1	—	1997
(Angola) C.D. Primeiro de Agosto	0	1	—	1998
(Angola) G.D. Interclube	0	1	—	2001
(Ghana) Asante Kotoko SC	0	1	—	2002

=== By country ===
country	Winners	Runners-up	Winning clubs	Runners-up
Egypt	8	0	Al Ahly (4), El Mokawloon SC (3), Zamalek SC (1)	-
Tunisia	4	3	ÉS Sahel (2), CA Bizerte (1), ES Tunis (1)	Club Africain (2), ES Tunis (1)
Nigeria	3	7	Shooting Stars FC (1), Enugu Rangers (1), BCC Lions (1)	Julius Berger FC (2), Stationery Stores F.C.(1), Leventis United (1), Ranchers Bees FC (1), Esan F.C. (1), BCC Lions (1)
Cameroon	3	4	Tonnerre Yaoundé (1), Canon Yaoundé (1), Union Douala (1)	Canon Yaoundé (3), Tonnerre Yaoundé (1)
Ivory Coast	2	3	Africa Sports National (2)	Africa Sports National (2), Stella Club d'Adjamé (1)
Democratic Republic of the Congo	2	1	TP Mazembe (1), DC Motema Pembe(1)	AC Sodigraf (1)
Kenya	1	2	Gor Mahia FC (1)	Gor Mahia FC (1), Kenya Breweries FC (1)
Algeria	1	1	JS Kabylie (1)	NA Hussein Dey (1)
Morocco	1	1	Wydad AC Casablanca (1)	FAR Rabat (1)
Zambia	1	1	Power Dynamos FC (1)	Power Dynamos FC (1)
Guinea	1	0	Horoya AC (1)	-
South Africa	1	0	Kaizer Chiefs FC (1)	-
Sudan	1	0	Al-Merrikh SC (1)	-
Angola	0	2	-	C.D. Primeiro de Agosto (1), G.D. Interclube (1)
Burundi	0	1	-	Vital'O FC (1)
Gabon	0	1	-	AS Sogara (1)
Ghana	0	1	-	Asante Kotoko SC (1)
Togo	0	1	-	OC Agaza (1)
