= List of African Cup of Champions Clubs and CAF Champions League finals =

- Founded: 1964
- Region: Africa (CAF)
- Teams: 16 (group stage) from 52; 2 (finalists)
- Current champions: (South Africa) Mamelodi Sundowns (2nd title)
- Most championships: (Egypt) Al Ahly (12 titles)
- 2024–25 CAF Champions League

The CAF Champions League is a seasonal association football competition established in 1964 as the African Cup of Champions Clubs, open initially to the league champions of all CAF member associations, but since 1997 also currently includes the clubs finishing second in the strongest leagues from the CAF 5-year ranking and the competition's defending champions.

== List of finals ==
Key
Won after extra time
Won on away goals
Won on penalty shoot-out
Won after a replay

- The "Year" column refers to the season the competition was held, and wikilinks to the article about that season.
- Finals are listed in the order they were played.

List of African Cup of Champions Clubs & CAF Champions League finals
List of African Cup of Champions Clubs finals (1964–1996)
Single match format
Year	Winner		Score	Runner-up		Venue	Attendance
Year	Nation	Club	Score	Club	Nation	Venue	Attendance
1964–65	Cameroon	Oryx Douala	2–1	Stade Malien	Mali	Accra Stadium, Accra	30,000
Two-legged format
Season	Winner		Score	Runner-up		Venue	Attendance
Season	Nation	Club	Score	Club	Nation	Venue	Attendance
1966	Ivory Coast	Stade d'Abidjan	1–3	Real Bamako	Mali	Stade Municipal, Bamako	
1966	Ivory Coast	Stade d'Abidjan	4–1	Real Bamako	Mali	Stade Félix Houphouët-Boigny, Abidjan	
1966	Stade d'Abidjan won 5–4 on aggregate						
1967	Congo-Kinshasa	TP Englebert	1–1	Asante Kotoko	Ghana	Kumasi Sports Stadium, Kumasi	
1967	Congo-Kinshasa	TP Englebert	2–2	Asante Kotoko	Ghana	Stade du 20 Mai, Kinshasa	
1967	Congo-Kinshasa	TP Englebert	w/o	Asante Kotoko	Ghana	Stade Omnisports de Yaoundé, Yaoundé	
1967	TP Englebert won after Asante Kotoko failed to appear for the 3rd match						
1968	Congo-Kinshasa	TP Englebert	5–0	Étoile Filante	Togo	Stade du 20 Mai, Kinshasa	
1968	Congo-Kinshasa	TP Englebert	1–4	Étoile Filante	Togo	Stade Général Eyadema, Lomé	
1968	TP Englebert won 6–4 on aggregate						
1969	United Arab Republic	Ismaily	2–2	TP Englebert	Congo-Kinshasa	Stade du 20 Mai, Kinshasa	
1969	United Arab Republic	Ismaily	3–1	TP Englebert	Congo-Kinshasa	Nasser Stadium, Cairo	130,000
1969	Ismaily won 5–3 on aggregate						
1970	Ghana	Asante Kotoko	1–1	TP Englebert	Congo-Kinshasa	Kumasi Sports Stadium, Kumasi	
1970	Ghana	Asante Kotoko	2–1	TP Englebert	Congo-Kinshasa	Stade du 20 Mai, Kinshasa	
1970	Asante Kotoko won 3–2 on aggregate						
1971	Cameroon	Canon Yaoundé	0–3	Asante Kotoko	Ghana	Kumasi Sports Stadium, Kumasi	
1971	Cameroon	Canon Yaoundé	2–0	Asante Kotoko	Ghana	Stade Militaire Garoua, Yaoundé	
1971	Cameroon	Canon Yaoundé	1–0	Asante Kotoko	Ghana	Stade Militaire Garoua, Yaoundé	
1971	Canon Yaoundé won 1–0 on the 3rd match						
1972	Guinea	Hafia FC	4–2	Simba FC	Uganda	Stade du 28 Septembre, Conakry	
1972	Guinea	Hafia FC	3–2	Simba FC	Uganda	Nakivubo Stadium, Kampala	
1972	Hafia FC won 7–4 on aggregate						
1973	Zaire	Vita Club	2–4	Asante Kotoko	Ghana	Kumasi Sports Stadium, Kumasi	
1973	Zaire	Vita Club	3–0	Asante Kotoko	Ghana	Stade du 20 Mai, Kinshasa	
1973	Vita Club won 5–4 on aggregate						
1974	Congo	CARA Brazzaville	4–2	Ghazl El Mahalla	Egypt	Stade de la Revolution, Brazzaville	
1974	Congo	CARA Brazzaville	2–1	Ghazl El Mahalla	Egypt	El Mahalla Stadium, El-Mahalla El-Kubra	
1974	CARA Brazzaville won 6–3 on aggregate						
1975	Guinea	Hafia FC	1–0	Enugu Rangers	Nigeria	Stade du 28 Septembre, Conakry	
1975	Guinea	Hafia FC	2–1	Enugu Rangers	Nigeria	Surulere Stadium, Lagos	
1975	Hafia FC won 3–1 on aggregate						
1976	Algeria	MC Alger	0–3	Hafia FC	Guinea	Stade du 28 Septembre, Conakry	30,000
1976	Algeria	MC Alger	3–0	Hafia FC	Guinea	Stade 5 Juillet, Algiers	80,000
1976	MC Alger won 3–1 on penalties (3–3 on aggregate)						
1977	Guinea	Hafia FC	1–0	Hearts of Oak	Ghana	Accra Sports Stadium, Accra	
1977	Guinea	Hafia FC	3–2	Hearts of Oak	Ghana	Stade du 28 Septembre, Conakry	
1977	Hafia FC won 4–2 on aggregate						
1978	Cameroon	Canon Yaoundé	0–0	Hafia FC	Guinea	Stade du 28 Septembre, Conakry	
1978	Cameroon	Canon Yaoundé	2–0	Hafia FC	Guinea	Stade Omnisport, Yaoundé	
1978	Canon Yaoundé won 2–0 on aggregate						
1979	Cameroon	Union Douala	0–1	Hearts of Oak	Ghana	Accra Sports Stadium, Accra	
1979	Cameroon	Union Douala	1–0	Hearts of Oak	Ghana	Stade Omnisport, Yaoundé	
1979	Union Douala won 5–3 on penalties (1–1 on aggregate)						
1980	Cameroon	Canon Yaoundé	2–2	AS Bilima	Zaire	Stade de Garoua, Garoua	
1980	Cameroon	Canon Yaoundé	3–0	AS Bilima	Zaire	Stade du 20 Mai, Kinshasa	
1980	Canon Yaoundé won 5–2 on aggregate						
1981	Algeria	JE Tizi Ouzou	4–0	Vita Club	Zaire	Stade 1er Novembre, Tizi-Ouzou	20,000
1981	Algeria	JE Tizi Ouzou	1–0	Vita Club	Zaire	Stade du 20 Mai, Kinshasa	30,000
1981	JE Tizi Ouzou won 5–0 on aggregate						
1982	Egypt	Al Ahly	3–0	Asante Kotoko	Ghana	Cairo International Stadium, Cairo	60,000
1982	Egypt	Al Ahly	1–1	Asante Kotoko	Ghana	Kumasi Sports Stadium, Kumasi	50,000
1982	Al Ahly won 4–1 on aggregate						
1983	Ghana	Asante Kotoko	0–0	Al Ahly	Egypt	Cairo International Stadium, Cairo	90,000
1983	Ghana	Asante Kotoko	1–0	Al Ahly	Egypt	Kumasi Sports Stadium, Kumasi	50,000
1983	Asante Kotoko won 1–0 on aggregate						
1984	Egypt	Zamalek SC	2–0	Shooting Stars	Nigeria	Cairo International Stadium, Cairo	
1984	Egypt	Zamalek SC	1–0	Shooting Stars	Nigeria	Surulere Stadium, Lagos	
1984	Zamalek SC won 3–0 on aggregate						
1985	Morocco	FAR Rabat	5–2	AS Bilima	Zaire	Moulay Abdellah Stadium, Rabat	
1985	Morocco	FAR Rabat	1–1	AS Bilima	Zaire	Mobutu Stadium, Lubumbashi	
1985	FAR Rabat won 6–3 on aggregate						
1986	Egypt	Zamalek SC	2–0	Africa Sports	Ivory Coast	Cairo International Stadium, Cairo	
1986	Egypt	Zamalek SC	0–2	Africa Sports	Ivory Coast	Stade Félix Houphouët-Boigny, Abidjan	
1986	Zamalek SC won 4–2 on penalties (2–2 on aggregate)						
1987	Egypt	Al Ahly	0–0	Al-Hilal	Sudan	Al-Hilal Stadium, Omdurman	
1987	Egypt	Al Ahly	2–0	Al-Hilal	Sudan	Cairo International Stadium, Cairo	70,000
1987	Al Ahly won 2–0 on aggregate						
1988	Algeria	Entente de Sétif	0–1	Iwuanyanwu Nationale	Nigeria	Liberty Stadium, Ibadan	
1988	Algeria	Entente de Sétif	4–0	Iwuanyanwu Nationale	Nigeria	Stade du 17 Juin, Constantine	55,000
1988	Entente de Sétif won 4–1 on aggregate						
1989	Morocco	Raja Casablanca	1–0	MC Oran	Algeria	Stade Mohamed V, Casablanca	50,000
1989	Morocco	Raja Casablanca	0–1	MC Oran	Algeria	Stade du 19 Juin, Oran	45,000
1989	Raja Casablanca won 4–2 on penalties (1–1 on aggregate)						
1990	Algeria	JS Kabylie	1–0	Nkana Red Devils	Zambia	Stade 5 Juillet, Algiers	65,000
1990	Algeria	JS Kabylie	0–1	Nkana Red Devils	Zambia	Independence Stadium, Lusaka	35,000
1990	JS Kabylie won 5–3 on penalties (1–1 on aggregate)						
1991	Tunisia	Club Africain	6–2	SC Villa	Uganda	Stade El Menzah, Tunis	40,000
1991	Tunisia	Club Africain	1–1	SC Villa	Uganda	Nakivubo Stadium, Kampala	25,000
1991	Club Africain won 7–3 on aggregate						
1992	Morocco	Wydad AC	2–0	Al-Hilal	Sudan	Stade Mohamed V, Casablanca	
1992	Morocco	Wydad AC	0–0	Al-Hilal	Sudan	Al-Hilal Stadium, Omdurman	
1992	Wydad Casablanca won 2–0 on aggregate						
1993	Egypt	Zamalek SC	0–0	Asante Kotoko	Ghana	Kumasi Sports Stadium, Kumasi	
1993	Egypt	Zamalek SC	0–0	Asante Kotoko	Ghana	Cairo International Stadium, Cairo	
1993	Zamalek SC won 7–6 on penalties (0–0 on aggregate)						
1994	Tunisia	ES Tunis	0–0	Zamalek SC	Egypt	Cairo International Stadium, Cairo	90 000
1994	Tunisia	ES Tunis	3–1	Zamalek SC	Egypt	Stade El Menzah, Tunis	50 000
1994	ES Tunis won 3–1 on aggregate						
1995	South Africa	Orlando Pirates	2–2	ASEC Mimosas	Ivory Coast	FNB Stadium, Johannesburg	
1995	South Africa	Orlando Pirates	1–0	ASEC Mimosas	Ivory Coast	Stade Félix Houphouët-Boigny, Abidjan	
1995	Orlando Pirates won 3–2 on aggregate						
1996	Egypt	Zamalek SC	1–2	Shooting Stars	Nigeria	Lekan Salami Stadium, Ibadan	30 000
1996	Egypt	Zamalek SC	2–1	Shooting Stars	Nigeria	Cairo International Stadium, Cairo	75 000
1996	Zamalek SC won 5–4 on penalties (3–3 on aggregate)						
List of CAF Champions League finals (1997–present)
1997	Morocco	Raja Casablanca	0–1	Obuasi Goldfields	Ghana	Len Clay Stadium, Obuasi	20,000
1997	Morocco	Raja Casablanca	1–0	Obuasi Goldfields	Ghana	Stade Mohamed V, Casablanca	85,000
1997	Raja Casablanca won 5–4 on penalties (1–1 on aggregate)						
1998	Ivory Coast	ASEC Mimosas	0–0	Dynamos FC	Zimbabwe	National Sports Stadium, Harare	45,000
1998	Ivory Coast	ASEC Mimosas	4–2	Dynamos FC	Zimbabwe	Stade Félix Houphouët-Boigny, Abidjan	50,000
1998	ASEC Mimosas won 4–2 on aggregate						
1999	Morocco	Raja Casablanca	0–0	ES Tunis	Tunisia	Stade Père-Jégo, Casablanca	10,000
1999	Morocco	Raja Casablanca	0–0	ES Tunis	Tunisia	Stade El Menzah, Tunis	50,000
1999	Raja Casablanca won 4–3 on penalties (0–0 on aggregate)						
2000	Ghana	Hearts of Oak	2–1	ES Tunis	Tunisia	Stade El Menzah, Tunis	30,000
2000	Ghana	Hearts of Oak	3–1	ES Tunis	Tunisia	Accra Sports Stadium, Accra	45,000
2000	Hearts of Oak won 5–2 on aggregate						
2001	Egypt	Al Ahly	1–1	Mamelodi Sundowns	South Africa	Loftus Versfeld Stadium, Pretoria	5,000
2001	Egypt	Al Ahly	3–0	Mamelodi Sundowns	South Africa	Cairo International Stadium, Cairo	80,000
2001	Al Ahly won 4–1 on aggregate						
2002	Egypt	Zamalek SC	0–0	Raja Casablanca	Morocco	Stade Mohamed V, Casablanca	60,000
2002	Egypt	Zamalek SC	1–0	Raja Casablanca	Morocco	Cairo International Stadium, Cairo	67,310
2002	Zamalek SC won 1–0 on aggregate						
2003	Nigeria	Enyimba	2–0	Ismaily	Egypt	Enyimba International Stadium, Aba	
2003	Nigeria	Enyimba	0–1	Ismaily	Egypt	Ismailia Stadium, Ismaïlia	20,000
2003	Enyimba won 2–1 on aggregate						
2004	Nigeria	Enyimba	1–2	ES Sahel	Tunisia	Stade Olympique de Sousse, Sousse	28,000
2004	Nigeria	Enyimba	2–1	ES Sahel	Tunisia	Enyimba International Stadium, Aba	60,000
2004	Enyimba won 5–3 on penalties (3–3 on aggregate)						
2005	Egypt	Al Ahly	0–0	Étoile du Sahel	Tunisia	Stade Olympique de Sousse, Sousse	20,000
2005	Egypt	Al Ahly	3–0	Étoile du Sahel	Tunisia	Military Academy Stadium, Cairo	35,000
2005	Al Ahly won 3–0 on aggregate						
2006	Egypt	Al Ahly	1–1	CS Sfaxien	Tunisia	Cairo International Stadium, Cairo	74,000
2006	Egypt	Al Ahly	1–0	CS Sfaxien	Tunisia	Stade 7 November, Radès	60,000
2006	Al Ahly won 2–1 on aggregate						
2007	Tunisia	ES Sahel	0–0	Al Ahly	Egypt	Stade Olympique de Sousse, Sousse	25,000
2007	Tunisia	ES Sahel	3–1	Al Ahly	Egypt	Cairo International Stadium, Cairo	74,000
2007	ES Sahel won 3–1 on aggregate						
2008	Egypt	Al Ahly	2–0	Coton Sport	Cameroon	Cairo International Stadium, Cairo	
2008	Egypt	Al Ahly	2–2	Coton Sport	Cameroon	Roumdé Adjia Stadium, Garoua	
2008	Al Ahly won 4–2 on aggregate						
2009	DR Congo	TP Mazembe	1–2	Heartland FC	Nigeria	Dan Anyiam Stadium, Owerri	10,000
2009	DR Congo	TP Mazembe	1–0	Heartland FC	Nigeria	Stade Frederic Kibassa Maliba, Lubumbashi	35,000
2009	TP Mazembe won on away goals (2–2 on aggregate)						
2010	DR Congo	TP Mazembe	5–0	ES Tunis	Tunisia	Stade Frederic Kibassa Maliba, Lubumbashi	50,000
2010	DR Congo	TP Mazembe	1–1	ES Tunis	Tunisia	Stade 7 November, Tunis	65,000
2010	TP Mazembe won 6–1 on aggregate						
2011	Tunisia	ES Tunis	0–0	Wydad AC	Morocco	Stade Mohamed V, Casablanca	70,000
2011	Tunisia	ES Tunis	1–0	Wydad AC	Morocco	Stade Olympique de Radès, Tunis	65,000
2011	ES Tunis won 1–0 on aggregate						
2012	Egypt	Al Ahly	1–1	ES Tunis	Tunisia	Borg El Arab Stadium, Alexandria	25,000
2012	Egypt	Al Ahly	2–1	ES Tunis	Tunisia	Stade Olympique de Radès, Tunis	31,000
2012	Al Ahly won 3–2 on aggregate						
2013	Egypt	Al Ahly	1–1	Orlando Pirates	South Africa	Orlando Stadium, Soweto	40,000
2013	Egypt	Al Ahly	2–0	Orlando Pirates	South Africa	Osman Ahmed Osman Stadium, Cairo	20,000
2013	Al Ahly won 3–1 on aggregate						
2014	Algeria	ES Sétif	2–2	AS Vita Club	DR Congo	Stade Tata Raphaël, Kinshasa	40,000
2014	Algeria	ES Sétif	1–1	AS Vita Club	DR Congo	Stade Mustapha Tchaker, Blida	35,000
2014	ES Sétif won on away goals (3–3 on aggregate)						
2015	DR Congo	TP Mazembe	2–1	USM Alger	Algeria	Stade Omar Hamadi, Algiers	15,000
2015	DR Congo	TP Mazembe	2–0	USM Alger	Algeria	Stade TP Mazembe, Lubumbashi	18,000
2015	TP Mazembe won 4–1 on aggregate						
2016	South Africa	Mamelodi Sundowns	3–0	Zamalek SC	Egypt	Lucas Masterpieces Moripe Stadium, Pretoria	30,000
2016	South Africa	Mamelodi Sundowns	0–1	Zamalek SC	Egypt	Borg El Arab Stadium, Alexandria	70,000
2016	Mamelodi Sundowns won 3–1 on aggregate						
2017	Morocco	Wydad AC	1–1	Al Ahly	Egypt	Borg El Arab Stadium, Alexandria	60,000
2017	Morocco	Wydad AC	1–0	Al Ahly	Egypt	Stade Mohamed V, Casablanca	68,000
2017	Wydad Casablanca won 2–1 on aggregate						
2018	Tunisia	ES Tunis	1–3	Al Ahly	Egypt	Borg El Arab Stadium, Alexandria	60,000
2018	Tunisia	ES Tunis	3–0	Al Ahly	Egypt	Stade Olympique de Radès, Tunis	60,000
2018	ES Tunis won 4–3 on aggregate						
2018–19	Tunisia	ES Tunis	1–1	Wydad AC	Morocco	Prince Moulay Abdellah Stadium, Rabat	50,000
2018–19	Tunisia	ES Tunis	3–0 |Abandoned (Note: In the 59th minute, Walid El Karti scored a goal for Wydad Casablanca which was subsequently ruled offside by the linesman. Due to a failure of the video assistant referee system, a review of the decision could not be conducted. Believing the goal was valid, Wydad Casablanca protested the decision and the match was interrupted. After 80 minutes of stoppage, the match was ruled as a forfeit by Wydad Casablanca and awarded to ES Tunis, securing them the CAF Champions League title.)	Wydad AC	Morocco	Stade Olympique de Radès, Tunis	60,000
2018–19	ES Tunis were declared champions with 4–1 on aggregate after second leg was abandoned						
Single match format
Year	Winner		Score	Runner-up		Venue	Attendance
Year	Nation	Club	Score	Club	Nation	Venue	Attendance
2019–20	Egypt	Al Ahly	2–1	Zamalek SC	Egypt	Cairo International Stadium, Cairo	0 (Note: The 2020 final was played behind closed doors due to the COVID-19 pandemic in Africa.)
2020–21	Egypt	Al Ahly	3–0	Kaizer Chiefs	South Africa	Stade Mohamed V, Casablanca	0 (Note: The 2021 final was played behind closed doors due to the COVID-19 pandemic in Africa.)
2021–22	Morocco	Wydad AC	2–0	Al Ahly	Egypt	Stade Mohamed V, Casablanca	45.000
Two-legged format
Season	Winner		Score	Runner-up		Venue	Attendance
Season	Nation	Club	Score	Club	Nation	Venue	Attendance
2022–23	Egypt	Al Ahly	2–1	Wydad AC	Morocco	Cairo International Stadium, Cairo	50.000
2022–23	Egypt	Al Ahly	1–1	Wydad AC	Morocco	Stade Mohamed V, Casablanca	45.000
2022–23	Al Ahly won 3–2 on aggregate						
2023–24	Egypt	Al Ahly	0–0	ES Tunis	Tunisia	Hammadi Agrebi Stadium, Tunis	35,000
2023–24	Egypt	Al Ahly	1–0	ES Tunis	Tunisia	Cairo International Stadium, Cairo	52,000
2023–24	Al Ahly won 1–0 on aggregate						
2024–25	Egypt	Pyramids	1–1	Mamelodi Sundowns	South Africa	Loftus Versfeld Stadium, Pretoria	50,000
2024–25	Egypt	Pyramids	2–1	Mamelodi Sundowns	South Africa	30 June Stadium, Cairo	25,000
2024–25	Pyramids won 3–2 on aggregate						
2025–26	South Africa	Mamelodi Sundowns	1–0	FAR Rabat	Morocco	Loftus Versfeld Stadium, Pretoria	51,000
2025–26	South Africa	Mamelodi Sundowns	1–1	FAR Rabat	Morocco	Prince Moulay Abdellah Stadium, Rabat	60,000
2025–26	Mamelodi Sundowns won 2–1 on aggregate						

== Performances ==
=== By club ===
Performance in the African Cup and CAF Champions League by club
Club	Titles	Runners-up	Seasons won	Seasons runner-up
(Egypt) Al Ahly	12	5	1982, 1987, 2001, 2005, 2006, 2008, 2012, 2013, 2020, 2021, 2023, 2024	1983, 2007, 2017, 2018, 2022
(Egypt) Zamalek	5	3	1984, 1986, 1993, 1996, 2002	1994, 2016, 2020
(Democratic Republic of the Congo) TP Mazembe	5	2	1967, 1968, 2009, 2010, 2015	1969, 1970
(Tunisia) ES Tunis	4	5	1994, 2011, 2018, 2019	1999, 2000, 2010, 2012, 2024
(Morocco) Wydad AC	3	3	1992, 2017, 2022	2011, 2019, 2023
(Guinea) Hafia FC	3	2	1972, 1975, 1977	1976, 1978
(Morocco) Raja CA	3	1	1989, 1997, 1999	2002
(Cameroon) Canon Yaoundé	3	0	1971, 1978, 1980	—
(Ghana) Asante Kotoko	2	5	1970, 1983	1967, 1971, 1973, 1982, 1993
(South Africa) Mamelodi Sundowns	2	2	2016, 2026	2001, 2025
(Algeria) JS Kabylie	2	0	1981, 1990	—
(Algeria) ES Sétif	2	0	1988, 2014	—
(Nigeria) Enyimba	2	0	2003, 2004	—
(Democratic Republic of the Congo) Vita Club	1	2	1973	1981, 2014
(Ghana) Hearts of Oak	1	2	2000	1977, 1979
(Tunisia) ES Sahel	1	2	2007	2004, 2005
(Egypt) Ismaily	1	1	1969	2003
(Morocco) AS FAR	1	1	1985	2026
(South Africa) Orlando Pirates	1	1	1995	2013
(Ivory Coast) ASEC Mimosas	1	1	1998	1995
(Cameroon) Oryx Douala	1	0	1965	—
(Ivory Coast) Stade d'Abidjan	1	0	1966	—
(Republic of the Congo) CARA Brazzaville	1	0	1974	—
(Algeria) MC Alger	1	0	1976	—
(Cameroon) Union Douala	1	0	1979	—
(Tunisia) Club Africain	1	0	1991	—
(Egypt) Pyramids	1	0	2025	—
(Democratic Republic of the Congo) AS Bilima	0	2	—	1980, 1985
(Sudan) Al-Hilal	0	2	—	1987, 1992
(Nigeria) Shooting Stars	0	2	—	1984, 1996
(Nigeria) Heartland	0	2	—	1988, 2009
(Mali) Stade Malien	0	1	—	1965
(Mali) Real Bamako	0	1	—	1966
Étoile Filante du Togo	0	1	—	1968
(Uganda) Simba FC	0	1	—	1972
(Egypt) Ghazl Al-Mehalla	0	1	—	1974
(Nigeria) Enugu Rangers	0	1	—	1975
(Ivory Coast) Africa Sports	0	1	—	1986
(Algeria) MC Oran	0	1	—	1989
(Zambia) Nkana FC	0	1	—	1990
(Uganda) SC Villa	0	1	—	1991
(Ghana) Ashanti Gold	0	1	—	1997
(Zimbabwe) Dynamos FC	0	1	—	1998
(Tunisia) CS Sfaxien	0	1	—	2006
(Cameroon) Coton Sport	0	1	—	2008
(Algeria) USM Alger	0	1	—	2015
(South Africa) Kaizer Chiefs	0	1	—	2021

=== By nations ===
Performance in finals by nation
Nation	Titles	Runners-up	Total
Egypt	19	10	29
Morocco	7	5	12
Tunisia	6	7	13
DR Congo	6	6	12
Algeria	5	2	7
Cameroon	5	1	6
Ghana	3	8	11
South Africa	3	4	7
Guinea	3	2	5
Nigeria	2	5	7
Ivory Coast	2	2	4
Congo	1	0	1
Mali	0	2	2
Uganda	0	2	2
Sudan	0	2	2
Togo	0	1	1
Zambia	0	1	1
Zimbabwe	0	1	1
