= List of football clubs in Madagascar =

The following is an incomplete list of association football clubs based in Madagascar. For a complete list see Category:Football clubs in Madagascar

== A ==
- Academie Ny Antsika
- AS Adema
- Ajesaia
- AS Fortior

== C ==
- CNaPS Sport

== F ==
- FC Ihosy
- Fitarikandro

== J ==
- Japan Actuel's FC

== S ==
- SO l'Emyrne
- Sistema

== T ==
- Tana FC Formation
- TCO Boeny

== U ==
- USCA Foot
- USJF Ravinala
