= Mamisoa Razafindrakoto =

Malagasy footballer

Personal information
- Date of birth: August 13, 1974 (age 52)
- Place of birth: Madagascar
- Position: Centre-back

Senior career*
Years	Team	Apps	(Gls)
1994–1999	AS Jirama		
2000–2002	Stade Olympique de l'Emyrne		
2003–2006	USCA Foot		
2007–2009(4)	Japan Actuel's		

International career^{‡}
1998–2011	Madagascar	63	(0)
- * Club domestic league appearances and goals ‡ National team caps and goals as of 5 June 2011

Mamisoa Razafindrakoto (born August 13, 1974) is a Malagasy former footballer.

He is known for letting in 149 own goals as a protest to the referee while playing for SO l'Emyrne.

== Honours ==
=== Club ===
Stade Olympique de l'Emyrne

- THB Champions League (1) : Champion : 2005

USCA Foot

- THB Champions League (1) : Champion : 2005
- Coupe de Madagascar (1) : 2005

=== National team ===
- Football at the Indian Ocean Island Games silver medal:2007

== As coach ==
He is now the coach of Disciples FC.
