= 1990 African Cup Winners' Cup =

Tournament details
- Dates: February - 8 December 1990
- Teams: 36 (from 1 confederation)

Final positions
- Champions: (Nigeria) BCC Lions (1st title)
- Runners-up: (Tunisia) Club Africain

Tournament statistics
- Matches played: 69
- Goals scored: 148 (2.14 per match)

The 1990 season of the African Cup Winners' Cup football club tournament was won by BCC Lions in two-legged final victory against Club Africain. This was the sixteenth season that the tournament took place for the winners of each African country's domestic cup. Thirty-six sides entered the competition, with Al Suguar withdrawing before the 1st leg of the first round.

== Preliminary round ==
| Team 1 | Agg. | Team 2 | 1st leg | 2nd leg |
|---|---|---|---|---|
| Anse-aux-Pins FC (Seychelles) | 1–17 | (Tanzania) Pamba SC | 0–5 | 1–12 |
| Desportivo Maputo (Mozambique) | 4–0 | Lesotho Defence Force FC | 2–0 | 2–0 |
| Liberté FC (Niger) | 1–2 | (Chad) Tourbillon FC | 0–0 | 1–2 |
| Moneni Pirates (Eswatini) | 1–6 | (Burundi) Vital'O FC | 0–0 | 1–6 |

== First round ==
| Team 1 | Agg. | Team 2 | 1st leg | 2nd leg |
|---|---|---|---|---|
| Al-Merrikh (Sudan) | w/o | (Libya) Al-Suqoor | 3–0 | — |
| BCC Lions (Nigeria) | 2–1 | (Togo) Entente II | 1–0 | 1–1 |
| Kenya Breweries | 2–1 | (Uganda) Nakivubo Villa | 0–0 | 2–1 |
| Darryn Textiles FC (Zimbabwe) | 1–5 | (Zambia) Red Arrows FC | 1–4 | 0–1 |
| Desportivo Maputo (Mozambique) | 1–1 (5–3 p) | (Angola) Ferroviário da Huíla | 0–1 | 1–0 |
| AS Fonctionnaires (Burkina Faso) | 0–3 | (Morocco) MAS Fez | 0–1 | 0–2 |
| Makona FC (Guinea) | 0–4 | (Ivory Coast) AS Sotra | 0–2 | 0–2 |
| LPRC Oilers (Liberia) | 0–1 | (Sierra Leone) East End Lions | 0–0 | 0–1 |
| Olympic Real (Central African Republic) | 1–1 (3–4 p) | (Benin) Requins de l'Atlantique | 1–0 | 0–1 |
| Pamba SC (Tanzania) | 1–2 | (Madagascar) BTM Antananarivo | 0–0 | 1–2 |
| Rayon Sports (Rwanda) | 1–2 | (Republic of the Congo) Diables Noirs | 0–0 | 1–2 |
| AS Real Bamako (Mali) | 1–4 | (Ghana) Hearts of Oak | 1–2 | 0–2 |
| RC Relizane (Algeria) | 1–6 | (Tunisia) Club Africain | 1–4 | 0–2 |
| Tourbillon FC (Chad) | 0–2 | (Gabon) Petrosport FC | 0–0 | 0–2 |
| US Ouakam (Senegal) | 3–0 | (Cameroon) Tonnerre Yaoundé | 2–0 | 1–0 |
| Vital'O FC (Burundi) | 2–2 (5–3 p) | (Zaire) FC Kalamu | 1–1 | 1–1 |

== Second round ==
| Team 1 | Agg. | Team 2 | 1st leg | 2nd leg |
|---|---|---|---|---|
| Kenya Breweries | 1–1 (a) | (Madagascar) BTM Antananarivo | 1–1 | 0–0 |
| Desportivo Maputo (Mozambique) | 3–2 | (Zambia) Red Arrows FC | 3–2 | 0–0 |
| Diables Noirs (Republic of the Congo) | 2–3 | (Nigeria) BCC Lions | 2–0 | 0–3 |
| East End Lions (Sierra Leone) | 0–2 | (Burundi) Vital'O FC | 0–0 | 0–2 |
| MAS Fez (Morocco) | 1–4 | (Tunisia) Club Africain | 1–0 | 0–4 |
| Petrosport FC (Gabon) | 2–2 (3–4 p) | (Sudan) Al-Merrikh | 2–0 | 0–2 |
| Requins de l'Atlantique (Benin) | 0–1 | (Senegal) US Ouakam | 0–0 | 0–1 |
| AS Sotra (Ivory Coast) | 2–3 | (Ghana) Hearts of Oak | 1–1 | 1–2 |

== Quarter-finals ==
| Team 1 | Agg. | Team 2 | 1st leg | 2nd leg |
|---|---|---|---|---|
| BTM Antananarivo (Madagascar) | 0–1 | (Sudan) Al-Merrikh | 0–0 | 0–1 |
| Desportivo Maputo (Mozambique) | 2–2 (a) | (Burundi) Vital'O FC | 1–0 | 1–2 |
| Hearts of Oak (Ghana) | 2–2 (5–6 p) | (Tunisia) Club Africain | 2–0 | 0–2 |
| US Ouakam (Senegal) | 1–4 | (Nigeria) BCC Lions | 0–1 | 1–3 |

== Semi-finals ==
| Team 1 | Agg. | Team 2 | 1st leg | 2nd leg |
|---|---|---|---|---|
| Al-Merrikh (Sudan) | 1–1 (3–4 p) | (Tunisia) Club Africain | 1–0 | 0–1 |
| Desportivo Maputo (Mozambique) | 3–7 | (Nigeria) BCC Lions | 2–1 | 1–6 |

== Final ==
| Team 1 | Agg. | Team 2 | 1st leg | 2nd leg |
|---|---|---|---|---|
| BCC Lions (Nigeria) | 4–1 | (Tunisia) Club Africain | 3–0 | 1–1 |

=== First leg ===
24 November 1990

| BCC Lions (Nigeria) | 3 – 0 | (Tunisia) Club Africain |
|---|---|---|
| Edema Fuludu 38' (pen.); Agum 84'; Igwilo 89' |

Surulere National Stadium, Lagos
Attendance: 30,000
Referee: Ali Hadih (Tanzania)

=== Second leg ===
8 December 1990

| Club Africain (Tunisia) | 1 – 1 | (Nigeria) BCC Lions |
|---|---|---|
| Lofti Mhaïssi 77' | | Angwe 36' |

Stade El Menzah, Tunis
Attendance: 50,000
Referee: Eganaden Cadressen (Mauritius)
