= List of football stadiums in Madagascar =

The following is a list of football stadiums in Madagascar, ordered by capacity. Currently stadiums with a capacity of 1,500 or more are included, most stadiums in Madagascar are used for football (soccer), and many others are used for Rugby Union as well as for Cultural events.

== Current stadiums ==
#	Images	Stadium	Capacity	City	RF
1		Mahamasina Municipal Stadium	40,880	Antananarivo	
2		Barikadimy Stadium	15,000	Toamasina	
3		Stade de Malacam	10,000	Antananarivo	
4		Rabemananjara Stadium	8,000	Mahajanga	
5		Stade Maître Kira	5,000	Toliara	
6		Stade Vélodrome Antsirabe	5,000	Antsirabe	
7		Stade de Toamasina	2,500	Toamasina	
8		Stade Olympique l'Emyrne	1,500	Antananarivo	

== See also ==
- Lists of stadiums
- List of association football stadiums by capacity
- List of African stadiums by capacity
- Football in Madagascar
