= 1997 African Cup Winners' Cup =

Tournament details
- Dates: February – 6 December 1997
- Teams: 41 (from 1 confederation)

Final positions
- Champions: (Tunisia) ES Sahel (1st title)
- Runners-up: (Morocco) FAR Rabat

Tournament statistics
- Matches played: 66
- Goals scored: 173 (2.62 per match)

The 1997 African Cup Winners' Cup football club tournament was won by Étoile Sportive du Sahel in two-legged final victory against FAR Rabat. This was the twenty-third season that the tournament took place for the winners of each African country's domestic cup. Forty-one sides entered the competition. Teams from Niger and the Central African Republic were disqualified because their federations were in debt to CAF. Club 'S' Namakia from Madagascar withdrew before the 1st leg of the preliminary round, Maxaquene from Mozambique withdrew before the 1st leg of the first round while Racing Bafoussam from Cameroon was disqualified for not showing up in time for the 1st leg. The last team to withdraw from the competition was Dragons from Zaire before the 1st leg of the second round.

Jomo Cosmos replaced Orlando Pirates, who were admitted to the Champions League for being the champions of both the league and cup competitions in South Africa.

== Preliminary round ==
Team 1	Agg.	Team 2	1st leg	2nd leg
Bata Bullets (Malawi)	2–2 (a)	(Rwanda) Kiyovu Sport	1–0	1–2
Awassa Flour Mill (Ethiopia)	0–5	Uganda Electricity Board	0–2	0–3
MP Tigers (Namibia)	1–1 (a)	(Eswatini) Eleven Men in Flight	1–1	0–0
Lerotholi Polytechnic (Lesotho)	2–1	(Botswana) Township Rollers	2–0	0–1
Club S Namakia (Madagascar)	w/o	(Seychelles) Red Star FC	—	—
Renaissance FC (Chad)	7–1	(Equatorial Guinea) Akonangui FC	3–0	4–1
Sigara SC (Tanzania)	1–3	(Zimbabwe) Dynamos FC	1–0	0–3
UNB FC (Benin)	dq^{1}	(Central African Republic) unknown	—	—
Étoile Filante (Burkina Faso)	dq^{1}	(Niger) Sahel SC	—	—

Notes
^{1} Sahel SC and Central African Republic representative club disqualified because their federations were in debt to CAF.

== First round ==
Team 1	Agg.	Team 2	1st leg	2nd leg
Al-Merreikh (Sudan)	0–3	(Egypt) El Mansoura SC	0–1	0–2
UNB FC (Benin)	0–6	(Nigeria) Julius Berger	0–3	0–3
Scouts Club (Mauritius)	3–4	(Réunion) SS Saint-Louisienne	2–1	1–3
Red Star FC (Seychelles)	w/o	(Mozambique) CD Maxaquene	—	—
Eleven Men in Flight (Eswatini)	0–6	(South Africa) Jomo Cosmos	0–3	0–3
Bata Bullets (Malawi)	0–2	(Zimbabwe) Dynamos FC	0–1	0–1
Mumias Sugar FC (Kenya)	0–2	(Egypt) El Mokawloon	0–0	0–2
Lerotholi Polytechnic (Lesotho)	0–6	(Zambia) Nchanga Rangers	0–1	0–5
FAR Rabat (Morocco)	4–2	(Mali) Real Bamako	4–1	0–1
FC 105 Libreville (Gabon)	2–1	(Angola) Progresso do Sambizanga	2–0	0–1
Étoile Filante (Burkina Faso)	3–4	(Tunisia) ES Sahel	3–0	0–4
ASFAG (Guinea)	0–2	(Ghana) Hearts of Oak	0–0	0–2
US Gorée (Senegal)	2–4	(Algeria) MC Oran	1–0	1–4
Renaissance FC (Chad)	3–7	(Zaire) AS Dragons	2–1	1–6
Vita Club Mokanda (Republic of the Congo)	1–2	(Ivory Coast) SO Armée	0–0	1–2
Uganda Electricity Board	dq^{1}	(Cameroon) RC Bafoussam	—	—

Notes
^{1} RC Bafoussam were disqualified for not showing up in time for the 1st leg.

== Second round ==
Team 1	Agg.	Team 2	1st leg	2nd leg
Julius Berger (Nigeria)	0–2	(Egypt) El Mansoura SC	0–0	0–2
Red Star FC (Seychelles)	0–5	(Réunion) SS Saint-Louisienne	0–2	0–3
Dynamos FC (Zimbabwe)	2–3	(South Africa) Jomo Cosmos	2–1	0–2
Nchanga Rangers (Zambia)	2–4	(Egypt) El Mokawloon	2–1	0–3
FC 105 Libreville (Gabon)	2–2 (3–4 p)	(Morocco) FAR Rabat	2–0	0–2
Hearts of Oak (Ghana)	3–6	(Tunisia) ES Sahel	2–2	1–4
Umeme FC^{1} (Uganda)	2–3	(Algeria) MC Oran	2–0	0–3
SO Armée (Ivory Coast)	w/o	(Zaire) AS Dragons	—	—

Notes
^{1} Uganda Electricity Board FC changed it name to Umeme FC.

== Quarter-finals ==
Team 1	Agg.	Team 2	1st leg	2nd leg
El Mansoura SC (Egypt)	5–2	(South Africa) Jomo Cosmos	3–0	2–2
El Mokawloon (Egypt)	2–4	(Tunisia) ES Sahel	2–2	0–2
SS Saint-Louisienne (Réunion)	3–3 (a)	(Ivory Coast) SO Armée	2–0	1–3
FAR Rabat (Morocco)	3–1	(Algeria) MC Oran	2–0	1–1

== Semi-finals ==
Team 1	Agg.	Team 2	1st leg	2nd leg
ES Sahel (Tunisia)	5–4	(Egypt) El Mansoura SC	3–0	2–4
FAR Rabat (Morocco)	5–2	(Réunion) SS Saint-Louisienne	3–0	2–2

== Final ==
Team 1	Agg.	Team 2	1st leg	2nd leg
ES Sahel (Tunisia)	2–1	(Morocco) FAR Rabat	2–0	0–1

=== First leg ===
22 November 1997

ES Sahel (Tunisia)	2 – 0	(Morocco) FAR Rabat
Mhedhebi 40'; Ben Younes 76' (pen.)

Stade Olympique de Sousse, Sousse
Attendance: 28,000

=== Second leg ===
6 December 1997

FAR Rabat (Morocco)	1 – 0	(Tunisia) ES Sahel
Chemmami 29'

Prince Moulay Abdellah Stadium, Rabat
Attendance: 45,000
Referee: Falla N'Doye (Senegal)

== Champions ==
1997 African Cup Winners' Cup Winners
(Tunisia)
ES Sahel
First title
