= Edema Fuludu =

Nigerian footballer

Personal information
- Full name: Edema Godmin Fuludu
- Date of birth: 8 May 1970 (age 56)
- Place of birth: Burutu, Nigeria
- Position: Midfielder

Senior career*
| Years | Team | Apps | (Gls) |
| 1987–1988 | New Nigerian Bank | | |
| 1990–1991 | BCC Lions | | |
| 1992 | Julius Berger | | |
| 1993–1994 | BCC Lions | | |
| 1994–1997 | Altay | 78 | (10) |
| 1997–1998 | Julius Berger | | |
| Total | | 78+ | (10+) |

International career
| 1991–1995 | Nigeria | 8 | (1) |

Managerial career
- Warri Wolves
- * Club domestic league appearances and goals

Edema Godmin Fuludu (born 8 May 1970) is a Nigerian former footballer who played as a midfielder. He played club football for New Nigerian Bank, BCC Lions and Julius Berger in Nigeria and Altay in Turkey, and played internationally for the Nigeria national team. He was part of Nigeria's squad for the 1994 African Cup of Nations. Fuludu has served as head coach of Warri Wolves.
