= Disciples FC =

- Full name: Disciples Football Club
- Founded: 2012 in Betafo, Vakinankaratra
- Chairman: Johnny Rijaniaina
- Manager: Mamisoa Razafindrakoto
- League: Madagascar
Home colours	Away colours

Disciples FC is a football club from Madagascar in Antsirabe, Vakinankaratra Region, founded 2012 in Betafo.

== Football Championship of Madagascar 2024 ==
The team won the final match of the 2024 Madagascar Championship against ASSM Elgeco Plus 0-0 (1–0 in overtime).

Season	Tournament	Round	Club	Home	overtime	Results
2023/24	Malagasy Pro League	Finals	MDG ASSM Elgeco Plus	0-0	1-0	1-0

== CAF Champions league ==
Season	Tournament	Round	Club	Home	Exterior	Results
2024/25	CAF Champions league	First Round	ZAF Orlando Pirates	0-0	0-4	0-4

First leg: Disciples FC : Orlando Pirates: 0:0

Second leg: Orlando Pirates: Disciples FC: 4:0

Orlando Pirates have qualified for the next round.

Coach: Mamisoa Razafindrakoto
