= Angwe =

Angwe may refer to:

- Buru–Angwe language, language
- Amir Angwe (1966–1995), Nigerian footballer
