= Kohinoor SC =

Malagasy football club

- Full name: Kohinoor Sporting Club
- Ground: Diana, Madagascar
- League: THB Champions League

Kohinoor Sporting Club is a Malagasy football club that currently plays in the THB Champions League the top division of Malagasy football. The team is based in the Diana in northern Madagascar.
