= FCE Atsinanana =

Malagasy football club

Atsinanana
- Full name: FCE Atsinanana
- Ground: Stade Municipal de Toamasina, Madagascar
- Capacity: 2,500
- League: THB Champions League

FCE Atsinanana is a Malagasy football club who currently plays in the THB Champions League the top division of Malagasy football. The team is based in the Atsinanana region in eastern Madagascar.

== Stadium ==
Currently the team plays at the 2500 capacity Stade Municipal de Toamasina.
