= FC Grand Olympique de Menabe =

Malagasy football club

Grand Olympique
- Full name: FC Grand Olympique de Menabe
- Ground: Municipal, Madagascar
- League: THB Champions League

FC Grand Olympique de Menabe is a Malagasy football club who currently plays in the THB Champions League the top division of Malagasy football. The team is based in the Menabe region in western Madagascar.
