= Sidore Rafenoarinosy =

Malagasy footballer

Personal information
- Date of birth: 19 June 1984 (age 42)
- Position: Midfielder

Senior career*
Years	Team	Apps	(Gls)
2003–2008	Ecoredipharm		
2008–2009	Petite Rivière Noire SC		

International career
2005	Madagascar	1	(0)
- * Club domestic league appearances and goals

Sidore Rafenoarinosy (born 19 June 1984) is a Malagasy former footballer who played as a midfielder.
