= 1984 African Cup Winners' Cup =

Tournament details
- Dates: April - 30 December 1984
- Teams: 35 (from 1 confederation)

Final positions
- Champions: (Egypt) Al Ahly (1st title)
- Runners-up: (Cameroon) Canon Yaoundé

Tournament statistics
- Matches played: 63
- Goals scored: 152 (2.41 per match)

The 1984 season of the African Cup Winners' Cup football club tournament was won by Al Ahly in two-legged final victory against Canon Yaoundé. This was the tenth season that the tournament took place for the winners of each African country's domestic cup. Thirty-five sides entered the competition, with CAP Owendo and Horoya AC withdrawing before the 1st leg of the first round.

== Preliminary round ==
Team 1	Agg.	Team 2	1st leg	2nd leg
Avia Sports (Central African Republic)	—^{1}	(Equatorial Guinea) GD Lage	0-0	abd
Mighty Barolle (Liberia)	3-0	(The Gambia) Hawks FC	3-0	0-0
Panthères Noires (Rwanda)	1-1 (a)	(Burundi) Inter FC	0-0	1-1

- 1:2nd leg abandoned at 1-0 for Lage after 80 minutes due to darkness; Avia Sports qualified

== First round ==
Team 1	Agg.	Team 2	1st leg	2nd leg
OC Agaza (Togo)	—^{1}	(Gabon) CAP Owendo	w/o	w/o
Al Ahly (Egypt)	5-1	(Morocco) CLAS Casablanca	3-1	2-0
Al-Merrikh (Sudan)	2-0	(Tanzania) KMKM FC	1-0	1-0
El Mokawloon SC (Egypt)	7-2	(Somalia) Horsed FC	7-0	0-2
Canon Yaoundé (Cameroon)	4-1	(Central African Republic) Avia Sports	3-0	1-1
Costa do Sol (Mozambique)	1-2	(Uganda) Villa SC	0-2	1-0
ASC Diaraf (Senegal)	3-2	(Sierra Leone) Mighty Blackpool	2-0	1-2
Dinamo Fima (Madagascar)	6-2	(Eswatini) Mbabane Highlanders	6-1	0-1
Enugu Rangers (Nigeria)	—^{2}	(Guinea) Horoya AC	w/o	w/o
Étoile Sportive du Sahel (Tunisia)	1-2	(Libya) Al-Ahli Tripoli	1-1	0-1
Great Olympics (Ghana)	4-0	(Mali) Djoliba Athletic Club	0-0	4-0
MP Alger (Algeria)	4-2	(Republic of Upper Volta) Racing Bobo Dioulasso	4-0	0-2
Mighty Barolle (Liberia)	3-4	(Zaire) AS Vita Club	2-1	1-3
Panthères Noires (Rwanda)	0-2	(Kenya) Scarlets FC	0-0	0-2
Red Arrows F.C. (Zambia)	12-2	(Lesotho) Linare FC	9-1	3-1
Requins de l'Atlantique FC (Benin)	2-4	(Ivory Coast) ASEC Abidjan	2-1	0-3

- 1:CAP Owendo were disbanded by the Gabon government before 1st leg.
- 2:Horoya AC withdrew before 1st leg due to death of Guinea's president Ahmed Sekou Touré.

== Second round ==
Team 1	Agg.	Team 2	1st leg	2nd leg
Al-Merrikh (Sudan)	0-2	(Egypt) El Mokawloon SC	0-0	0-2
ASC Diaraf (Senegal)	2-4	(Libya) Al-Ahli Tripoli	2-1	0-3
Dinamo Fima (Madagascar)	0-2	(Cameroon) Canon Yaoundé	0-1	0-1
Enugu Rangers (Nigeria)	2-0	(Togo) OC Agaza	1-0	1-0
Great Olympics (Ghana)	2-3	(Ivory Coast) ASEC Abidjan	2-1	0-2
MP Alger (Algeria)	2-3	(Egypt) Al Ahly	1-0	1-3
Scarlets FC (Kenya)	1-5	(Uganda) Villa SC	0-3	1-2
AS Vita Club (Zaire)	2-2 (a)	(Zambia) Red Arrows F.C.	2-1	0-1

== Quarterfinals ==
Team 1	Agg.	Team 2	1st leg	2nd leg
El Mokawloon SC (Egypt)	2-2 (a)	(Uganda) Villa SC	1-0	1-2
ASEC Abidjan (Ivory Coast)	3-4	(Egypt) Al Ahly	2-1	1-3
Canon Yaoundé (Cameroon)	5-3	(Nigeria) Enugu Rangers	5-0	0-3
Red Arrows F.C. (Zambia)	2-3	(Libya) Al-Ahli Tripoli	2-0	0-3

== Semifinals ==
Team 1	Agg.	Team 2	1st leg	2nd leg
Al Ahly (Egypt)	1-1 (a)	(Egypt) El Mokawloon SC	0-0	1-1
Canon Yaoundé (Cameroon)	1-1 (4-5 p)	(Libya) Al-Ahli Tripoli	1-0	0-1

== Final ==
Al-Ahli SC (Tripoli) withdrew before the final for political reasons (refusing to play Egyptian teams) and were replaced by Canon Yaoundé.

Team 1	Agg.	Team 2	1st leg	2nd leg
Canon Yaoundé (Cameroon)	1-1 (2-4 p)	(Egypt) Al Ahly	1-0	0-1

== Winners ==
African Cup Winners' Cup Winners
(Egypt)
Al Ahly
First title
