= AS Somasud =

Malagasy football club

- Full name: Association Sportive Somasud
- Ground: Stade Maître Kira; Toliara, Madagascar
- Capacity: 5,000
- League: THB Champions League

Association Sportive Somasud is a Malagasy football club based in Toliara in the Ihorombe Region in south Madagascar. In 1981 the team has won the THB Champions League.

== Stadium ==
Currently the team plays at the 5000 capacity Stade Maître Kira.

== Honours ==
- THB Champions League

Champion (1): 1981
