= Stade Olympique l'Emyrne =

Sports venue in Antananarivo, Madagascar

Coordinates: 18.9333°S 47.5167°E

- Interactive map of Stade Olympique l'Emyrne
- Full name: Stade Olympique l'Emyrne
- Location: Antananarivo, Madagascar
- Capacity: 1,500
- Surface: Grass

Tenant
- SO l'Emyrne

Stade Olympique l'Emyrne is a multi-purpose stadium in Antananarivo, Madagascar. It is currently used mostly for and football matches and hosts the homes matches of SO l'Emyrne, a former member of the THB Champions League. The stadium has a capacity 1,500 spectators.
