= USJF Ravinala =

Malagasy football club

- Full name: Union Sportive des Jeunes Foot-balleurs Ravinala
- League: Analamanga Regional League
- 2006: 3rd

USJF Ravinala is a Malagasy football club based in Antananarivo. In 2004, they won a triple of the THB Champions League, Coupe de Madagascar and the Analamanga Regional League.

== Achievements ==
- THB Champions League: 1

2004

- Coupe de Madagascar: 1

2004

== Performance in CAF competitions ==
- CAF Champions League: 1 appearance

2005 – First Round

- CAF Confederation Cup: 1 appearance

2006 – Second Round

== Current squad ==
Note: Flags indicate national team as defined under FIFA eligibility rules; some limited exceptions apply. Players may hold more than one non-FIFA nationality.

No.	Pos.	Nation	Player
7	FW	MAD	Norbert Marc Fydelis
9	FW	MAD	Tovomalala Randriambelson
