= Amir Angwe =

Nigerian footballer

Personal information
- Date of birth: 1966
- Date of death: 29 October 1995 (aged 29)
- Place of death: Onikan Stadium, Lagos, Nigeria
- Position: Forward

Senior career*
Years	Team	Apps	(Gls)
- BCC Lions
–1995	Julius Berger		

International career
1989	Nigeria	1	(0)
- * Club domestic league appearances and goals

Amir Angwe (1966 – 29 October 1995) was a Nigerian international footballer who played for BCC Lions and Julius Berger, and represented the Nigeria national football team. He died following a heart attack in an African Cup Winners' Cup game against Mozambique side Maxaquene.

== Career statistics ==
=== International ===
National team	Year	Apps	Goals
Nigeria	1989	1	0
Total		1	0
