= Ajesaia =

Malagasy football club

- Full name: Association des Jeunes Sportifs de l'Avenir Inter-Arrondissements
- Founded: 1998
- Ground: Mahamasina Stadium; Antananarivo, Madagascar
- Capacity: 40,880
- Chairman: Manda RATSIMBAZAFY
- Manager: Jeremia Randriambololona
- League: THB Champions League

Ajesaia is a Malagasy football club based in Itaosy, Analamanga. The team won the Coupe de Madagascar in 2006, qualifying them for the Super Coupe de Madagascar (which they lost 1–0 to AS Adema) and the CAF Confederation Cup (where they beat Curepipe Starlight SC of Mauritius in the preliminary round, but lost to Ismaily SC of Egypt in the first round).

The team has a feeder club agreement with SS Saint-Pauloise of Réunion, which in turn has one with French giants Olympique Lyonnais.

== Achievements ==
- THB Champions League: 2

2007, 2009

- Coupe de Madagascar: 1

2006

- Super Coupe de Madagascar: 2

2007, 2009

- Mondial Pupilles de Plomelin (Under 13s): 1

2005

== Performance in CAF competitions ==
- CAF Champions League: 1 appearance

2010 – preliminary round

- CAF Confederation Cup: 1 appearance

2007 – first round
