= 1982 African Cup Winners' Cup =

Tournament details
- Dates: April - 3 December 1982
- Teams: 33 (from 1 confederation)

Final positions
- Champions: (Egypt) El Mokawloon SC (1st title)
- Runners-up: (Zambia) Power Dynamos F.C.

Tournament statistics
- Matches played: 61
- Goals scored: 137 (2.25 per match)

The 1982 season of the African Cup Winners' Cup football club tournament was won by El Mokawloon SC in two-legged final victory against Power Dynamos F.C. This was the eighth season that the tournament took place for the winners of each African country's domestic cup. thirty-three sides entered the competition, with Printing Agency withdrawing before the 1st leg of the first round and Gor Mahia withdrawing after the 1st leg of the same round.

== Preliminary round ==
Team 1	Agg.	Team 2	1st leg	2nd leg
Zoundourma (Niger)	3-4	(Mauritania) ASC Garde Nationale	3-0	0-4

== First round ==
Team 1	Agg.	Team 2	1st leg	2nd leg
Bendel Insurance F.C. (Nigeria)	3-0	(Togo) OC Agaza	2-0	1-0
CARA Brazzaville (Republic of the Congo)	1-2	(Algeria) USK Alger	1-0	0-2
Coffee United SC (Uganda)	0-2	(Zambia) Power Dynamos F.C.	0-0	0-2
Desportivo de Maputo (Mozambique)	——^{1}	(Somalia) Printing Agency	w/o	w/o
Desportivo da TAAG (Angola)	0-0^{2}	(Zaire) AS Vita Club	0-0	0-0
CD Elá Nguema (Equatorial Guinea)	1-8	(Cameroon) Union Douala	0-2	1-6
FC 105 Libreville (Gabon)	3-3	(Guinea) Gbessia A.C.	1-1	2-2
ASC Garde Nationale (Mauritania)	0-3	(Cameroon) Dynamo Douala	0-1	0-2
Gor Mahia (Kenya)	——^{3}	(Madagascar) Dinamo Fima	2-3	——
Hay Al-Arab SC (Sudan)	2-4	(Egypt) El Mokawloon SC	1-1	1-3
Kamboi Eagles (Sierra Leone)	0-10	(Ivory Coast) Africa Sports National	0-4	0-6
Maseru Rovers (Lesotho)	0-2	(Zimbabwe) CAPS United F.C.	0-1	0-1
Mighty Barolle (Liberia)	0-1	(Senegal) ASF Police	0-0	0-1
Mukura Victory Sports FC (Rwanda)	0-8	(Tanzania) Pan African FC	0-4	0-4
Requins de l'Atlantique FC (Benin)	0-1	(Mali) Djoliba Athletic Club	0-0	0-1
Wallidan F.C. (The Gambia)	2-4	(Ghana) Accra Hearts of Oak SC	1-0	1-4

- 1:National Printing Agency withdrew before 1st leg.
- 2:AS Vita Club won 5-4 on PSO.
- 3:Gor Mahia withdrew after 1st leg.

== Second round ==
Team 1	Agg.	Team 2	1st leg	2nd leg
El Mokawloon SC (Egypt)	5-2	(Mozambique) Desportivo de Maputo	3-2	2-0
Bendel Insurance F.C. (Nigeria)	3-3^{1}	(Algeria) USK Alger	3-1	0-2
CAPS United F.C. (Zimbabwe)	4-3	(Madagascar) Dinamo Fima	1-1	3-2
Dynamo Douala (Cameroon)	1-3	(Ivory Coast) Africa Sports National	1-2	0-1
Pan African FC (Tanzania)	1-1^{2}	(Zambia) Power Dynamos F.C.	1-0	0-1
ASF Police (Senegal)	1-1^{3}	(Ghana) Accra Hearts of Oak SC	1-0	0-1
Union Douala (Cameroon)	0-4	(Mali) Djoliba Athletic Club	0-1	0-3
AS Vita Club (Zaire)	4-0	(Gabon) FC 105 Libreville	4-0	0-0

- 1:USK Algiers advanced on away goals rule.
- 2:Power Dynamos F.C. won 5-3 on PSO.
- 3:Accra Hearts of Oak SC won 4-3 on PSO.

== Quarterfinals ==
Team 1	Agg.	Team 2	1st leg	2nd leg
Africa Sports National (Ivory Coast)	2-3	(Egypt) El Mokawloon SC	2-0	0-3
CAPS United F.C. (Zimbabwe)	1-5	(Zambia) Power Dynamos F.C.	1-2	0-3
USK Alger (Algeria)	2-3	(Ghana) Accra Hearts of Oak SC	2-1	0-2
AS Vita Club (Zaire)	0-1	(Mali) Djoliba Athletic Club	0-0	0-1

== Semifinals ==
Team 1	Agg.	Team 2	1st leg	2nd leg
El Mokawloon SC (Egypt)	3-2	(Ghana) Accra Hearts of Oak SC	1-1	2-1
Power Dynamos F.C. (Zambia)	2-1	(Mali) Djoliba AC	2-1	0-0

== Final ==
Team 1	Agg.	Team 2	1st leg	2nd leg
Power Dynamos F.C. (Zambia)	0-4	(Egypt) El Mokawloon SC	0-2	0-2

== Champions ==
African Cup Winners' Cup Winners
(Egypt)
El Mokawloon SC
First title
