= ASSM Elgeco Plus =

Malagasy football club

AS Elgeco Plus
- Full name: Association Sportive Elgeco Plus
- Ground: Stade de l'Elgeco Plus; Analamanga, Madagascar
- President: Alfred Randriamanampisoa
- Coach: Andry Hildecoeur
- League: 𝐖𝐎𝐑𝐋𝐃 𝐂𝐎𝐋𝐀 𝐏𝐅𝐋

Association Sportive Elgeco Plus is a football (soccer) club from Madagascar based in Antananarivo, Analamanga. It was founded by a fusion of the former clubs Real Elgeco Plus from Manakara and AS Saint Michel in 2008.

== Achievements ==
- THB Champions League : 2

1971, 1978.

- Coupe de Madagascar: 5

1980, 2013, 2014, 2018, 2022, 2023, 2024, 2025.

- Super Coupe de Madagascar : 0

== Performance in CAF competitions ==
- CAF Confederation Cup: 2 appearances

2014 - Preliminary Round
2015 - Preliminary Round

2024 - 1st round against C.D. Lunda Sul

== Players 2023 ==
- Nina Rakotoasimbola (goalkeeper)
- Ardino Raveloarisaona alias Dinho
- Doody

== History ==
=== AS Saint Michel ===
As Saint Michel was a Malagasy football club based in Antananarivo in the Analamanga zone in central Madagascar. The team played in THB Champions League the top division of Malagasy football. In 1971 and 1978 the club won the THB Champions League, and in 1980 won the Coupe de Madagascar. In 2008 this club fused with Real Elgeco Plus from Manakara to become AS Elgeco Plus
