= Silures Bobo-Dioulasso =

Silures de Bobo-Dioulasso was a Burkinabé football club based in Bobo-Dioulasso. In the seventies it was the leading team of the Upper Volta. It went out of existence in 1982.

== Achievements ==
- Champions Upper-Volta: 7

1974, 1975, 1976, 1977, 1978, 1979, 1980

- Coupe du Haute-Volte: 1

1981

== Performance in CAF competitions ==
- African Cup of Champions Clubs: 6 appearances

1975: Second Round
1976: Second Round
1978: Quarter-Finals
1979: Second Round
1980: Second Round
1981: Second Round
