= MMM Toamasina =

Malagasy football club

MMM Tamatave
- Full name: MMM Tamatave
- Ground: Barikadimy Stadium; Toamasina, Madagascar
- Capacity: 20,000
- League: THB Champions League

MMM Tamatave is a Malagasy football club based in Toamasina, Madagascar.

The team plays in the Malagasy Second Division.

In 1970 the team has won the THB Champions League.

== Achievements ==
- THB Champions League: 2

1970, 1980

== Performance in CAF competitions ==
- CAF Champions League: 2 appearances

1971 African Cup of Champions Clubs
1981 African Cup of Champions Clubs
