= JS Antalaha =

Malagasy football club

JS
- Full name: JS Antalaha
- Ground: Antalaha Stadium; Antalaha, Madagascar
- Capacity: ?
- League: Malagasy Second Division

JS Antalaha is a Malagasy football club based in Antalaha, Madagascar. The team has won the THB Champions League in 1973, qualifying them for the 1974 African Cup of Champions Clubs.

The team currently plays in the Malagasy Second Division.

== Achievements ==
- THB Champions League: 1

1973

=== Regional Champion ===
Football champion of SAVA in 2012, 2014 and 2019.

== Performance in CAF competitions ==
- CAF Champions League: 1 appearance

1974 African Cup of Champions Clubs – first round
