= Jos Nosy-Bé =

Malagasy football club

- Full name: Jos Nosy-Bé
- Ground: Nosy-Bé Stadium; Nosy Be, Madagascar
- League: Malagasy Second Division

Jos Nosy-Bé is a Malagasy football club based in Nosy Be, Madagascar. The team has won Madagascar's top level THB Champions League in 1987, qualifying them for the 1988 African Cup of Champions Clubs.

As of 2014, Jos Nosy-Bé was playing in the Malagasy Second Division.

== Achievements ==
- THB Champions League Champion: 1987

== Performance in CAF competitions ==
- CAF Champions League: 1 appearance

1988 African Cup of Champions Clubs - first round
