= ASJFC Capricorne =

Malagasy football club

Capricorne
- Full name: Capricorne FC
- Ground: Stade Maître Kira, Madagascar
- Chairman: Jean-Philippe Rasoazanany
- Manager: Édouard Razanadrakoto
- League: THB Champions League

Capricorne FC is a Malagasy football club who currently plays in the THB Champions League the top division of Malagasy football. The team is based in the Atsimo-Andrefana region in western Madagascar.

== Stadium ==
Currently the team plays at the 5000 capacity Stade Maître Kira.
