= Ecoredipharm =

Malagasy football club

- Full name: Ecoredipharm Toamasina
- Ground: Stade Municipal de Toamasina; Toamasina, Madagascar
- Capacity: 2,500
- League: Malagasy Second Division
- 2013: 6th place

Ecoredipharm Toamasina is a Malagasy football club who currently plays in the Malagasy Second Division the second division of Malagasy football. The team is based in Toamasina city in eastern Madagascar.

In 2003 the team has won the THB Champions League.

== Stadium ==
Currently the team plays at the 2500 capacity Stade Municipal de Toamasina.

== Honours ==
- THB Champions League

Champion (1): 2003

== Performance in CAF competitions ==
- CAF Champions League: 1 appearance

2004 – First Round

== See also ==
- 2004 CAF Champions League
