= AS Sotema =

Malagasy football club

- Full name: Association Sportive Sotema
- Ground: unknown Mahajanga, Madagascar
- League: THB Champions League

AS Sotema is a Malagasy football club based in Mahajanga, Madagascar.

== Achievements ==
- THB Champions League: 4

1985, 1989, 1991, 1992

- Coupe de Madagascar: 3

1978, 1979, 1982

== Performance in CAF competitions ==
- African Cup of Champions Clubs: 4 appearances

1986: First Round
1990: First Round
1992: Second Round
1993: Second Round

- CAF Cup Winners' Cup: 3 appearances

1979 – Quarter-Finals
1980 – First Round
1983 – Second Round
