= AS Corps Enseignement =

Malagasy football club

AS Corps
- Full name: AS Corps Enseignement
- Ground: Toliara Stadium; Toliara, Madagascar
- League: THB Champions League

AS Corps Enseignement is a Malagasy football club based in Toliara, Madagascar.

The team plays in the Malagasy Second Division.

In 1974 the team has won the THB Champions League.

== Achievements ==
- THB Champions League: 3

1974, 1975, 1977

== Performance in CAF competitions ==
- CAF Champions League: 1appearance

1975 African Cup of Champions Clubs
