= Academie Ny Antsika =

Malagasy football club

Académie Ny Antsika
- Full name: Académie JMG
- Founded: 2000
- Dissolved: 2012
- Ground: Vakinankaratra, Madagascar
- League: THB Champions League
- Website: http://www.academie-jmg.com/

Académie Ny Antsika is a football club in Antsirabe, Vakinankaratra, Madagascar. In January 2009, an Academie Ny Antsika match against US Stade Tamponnaise was canceled due to the 2009 political violence.

This football club closed down in 2012 after retreat of its sponsor.

== Regional champions (Vakinakaratra) ==
2006, 2007, 2008, 2009, 2010, and 2011.

== Achievements ==
- THB Champions League
  - Champions (1): 2008

== Performance in CAF competitions ==
- CAF Champions League: 1 appearance

2009: Preliminary Round
