= Al Merrikh SC =

Sudanese football club

Al-Merrikh
- Full name: Al-Merrikh Sporting Club
- Nicknames: Al-Zaeem الزعيم (The Chief); The Red Devils; Al-Ahmar Al-Wahhaj (The Glowing Red)
- Founded: 1908; 118 years ago as Al-Maslamah; 1927; 99 years ago as Al–Merrikh SC
- Ground: Al-Merrikh Stadium; Omdurman
- Capacity: 43,000
- President: Mujahed Sahl
- Manager: Darko Novic
Home colours	Away colours	Third colours

Al-Merrikh Sporting Club (Arabic: نادي المريخ الرياضي) is a Sudanese professional football club based in the city of Omdurman. Their home stadium is Al-Merrikh Stadium, which is locally known as The Red Castle. Founded in 1908, Al-Merrikh is one of the oldest football clubs in Africa and competes in the Sudan Premier League. The club currently competes in the Rwanda Premier League, the top-flight of football in Rwanda, due to the ongoing Sudanese civil war.

== Club history ==
Al-Merrikh was founded under the name of Al-Masalma Sporting Club in 1908 by students from Al-Masalmah district that was headed by their chairman Jek Deng Aban Gorang in Omdurman of Gordon Memorial College. The club renamed as Al-Merrikh Sporting Club on 14 November 1927.

== Rivalries ==
The club has a fierce rivalry with Al-Hilal with the games between them regularly selling out, with both teams being perennial contenders. They won the Om-al-Dahab championship in 1965 and are the only team to have ever won this one time event. Al-Hilal is also based in Omdurman with only Al-Ardha Street separating the teams. Between them they are Sudan's two most successful football clubs.

== Honours ==
Al-Merrikh SC Honours
Type	competition	titles	seasons
Domestic (SFA)	Sudan League / Sudan Premier League	19	1970, 1972, 1974, 1977, 1982, 1985, 1990, 1993, 1997, 2000, 2001, 2002, 2008, 2011, 2013, 2015, 2018, 2018–19, 2019–20,
Domestic (SFA)	Sudan Cup	19	1951,1955, 1961, 1962, 1991, 1993, 1994, 1996, 2001, 2005, 2006, 2007, 2008, 2010, 2012, 2013, 2014, 2015, 2018. (Record)
Domestic (SFA)	Khartoum League	17	1954, 1956, 1962, 1966, 1968, 1972, 1975, 1980, 1981, 1983, 1985, 1986, 1991, 1992, 1993, 1996, 1997
Continental (CAF)	African Cup Winners' Cup	1	1989
Regional CECAFA	CECAFA Clubs Cup	3	1986, 1994, 2014

== Players ==
As of 22 August 2026

Note: Flags indicate national team as defined under FIFA eligibility rules; some limited exceptions apply. Players may hold more than one non-FIFA nationality.

No.	Pos.	Nation	Player
1	GK	SDN	Garas Kafi
2	DF	MAD	Nicolas Randriamanampisoa
3	DF	MLI	Daouda Ba
4	DF	SDN	Musab Makeen
5	DF	CGO	Janard Mbemba
7	MF	SDN	Muhamed Alrasheed (3rd Captain)
8	MF	CMR	Nathan Douala
9	FW	MAD	Fenohasina Razafimaro
10	FW	GUI	Aboubacar Bangoura
11	FW	GUI	Moussa Moise Camara
12	DF	SDN	Tawfeeg Burae
13	DF	SDN	Ahmed Tabanja
14	MF	SDN	Muataz Hashem
15	MF	ZAM	Obino Chisala
16	GK	SDN	Muhamed Alnour Abouja
18	MF	SDN	Mustafa Salah Naji

No.	Pos.	Nation	Player
19	FW	CIV	Muhamed Gabane
20	MF	MLI	Ibrahima Traoré
21	DF	SDN	Amir Kamal (Captain)
22	DF	SEN	Daba Sogoba
23	DF	CIV	Kone Sidick
24	MF	SDN	Waheeb Shendi
25	FW	MAW	Chikumbutso Salima
26	MF	MLI	Fady Coulibaly
27	FW	SDN	Mujtaba Faisal
28	FW	SDN	Omer Hemed
29	MF	SDN	Ramadan Agab (Vice-Captain)
30	MF	NGR	Jide Fatokun
31	FW	MAD	Mika Razafimahatana
32	FW	SDN	Muhamed Tia Asad
33	MF	GHA	Enoch Morrison
40	GK	BFA	Ladji Sanou

== Captain history ==
- (Sudan) Hassan Abu Al-Aila (1958-1962)
- (Sudan) Abdelwahab Jagdoul (1962-1972)
- (Sudan) Abdelaziz Abdallah (1972-1974)
- (Sudan) Bushra Wahba (1974-1975)
- (Sudan) Bushara Abdel-Nadief (1975-1978)
- (Sudan) Suliman Abdelgader (1978-1982)
- (Sudan) Ammar Khaled (1982-1986)
- (Sudan) Hamed Berima (1987-1996)
- (Sudan) Babeker Alhelu (1997)
- (Sudan) Muntaser Alzaki (1998-1999)
- (Sudan) Ibrahim Hussein (1999-2003)
- (Sudan) Khaled Ahmed Almustafa (2001)
- (Sudan) Muhamed Musa (2004)
- (Sudan) Najmeldin Abu Hashish (2005)
- (Sudan) Faisal Agab (2006-2013)
- (Sudan) Saeed Mustafa (2014)
- (Sudan) Ahmed El-Basha (2015)
- (Sudan) Raji Abdel-Aati (2016-2017)
- (Sudan) Ahmed Dufur (2018-2019)
- (Sudan) Amir Kamal (2019-)

== Performance in CAF Competitions ==
- CAF Champions League 31 Appearances
- 1971 - Second round
- 1973 - Second round
- 1975 - Quarter-finals
- 1978 - Second round
- 1983 - First round
- 1986 - First round
- 1991 - First round
- 1994 - First round
- 1998 - First round
- 2001 - Second round
- 2002 - Second round
- 2003 - First round
- 2009 - Group stage
- 2010 - Second round
- 2011 - First round
- 2012 - Second round
- 2013 - First round
- 2014 - Preliminary round
- 2015 - Semi-finals
- 2016 - Second round
- 2017 - Group stage
- 2018 - Preliminary round
- 2018-19 - Preliminary round
- 2019-20 - Preliminary round
- 2020-21 - Group stage
- 2021-22 - Group stage
- 2022-23 - Group stage
- 2023-24 - Second round
- 2024-25 - Second round
- 2025-26 - First round
- 2026-27 - Second round
- CAF Confederation Cup 8 Appearances
- 2004 - Preliminary round
- 2005 - Second Round
- 2006 - Play-off Round
- 2007 - Runners-up
- 2008 - Group Stage
- 2010 - Play-off round
- 2012 - Semi-finals
- 2016 - Play-off
- African Cup Winners' Cup 11 Appearances
- 1984 - Second round
- 1985 - First round
- 1987 - Second round
- 1989 - Winners
- 1990 - Semi-finals
- 1992 - Semi-finals
- 1993 - Quarter-finals
- 1995 - Second round
- 1997 - First round
- 1999 - First round
- 2000 - Second round

== Performance in Arab Competitions ==
- Arab Champions League 12 Appearances
- 1988 - Group stage
- 1994 - Group stage
- 2002 - First round
- 2003-04 - First round
- 2005-06 - First round
- 2006-07 - First round
- 2007-08 - Second round
- 2008-09 - Second round
- 2017 - Group stage
- 2018-19 - Semi-finals
- 2019-20 - First round
- 2023 - First round
- Arab Cup Winners' Cup 3 Appearances
- 1992 - Preliminary round
- 1999 - Preliminary round
- 2000 - Group stage

== Performance in CECAFA Competitions ==
- CECAFA Clubs Cup 8 Appearances
- 1985 - 3rd Place
- 1986 - Champions
- 1987 - Runners-up
- 1988 - Runners-up
- 1994 - Champions
- 2009 - Runners-up
- 2011 - 3rd Place
- 2014 - Champions
