= Fitarikandro =

Malagasy football club

- Full name: Fitarikandro Soa Firegnina
- Ground: ?, Madagascar
- League: THB Champions League

Fitarikandro (Fitarikandro ny Soa Firaignina (F.S.F.)) is a Malagasy football club based in Madagascar.

In 1968 and 1990 the club won the THB Champions League.

== Achievements ==
- THB Champions League: 2

1968, 1990

== Performance in CAF competitions ==
- African Cup of Champions Clubs: 1 appearance

1969
