= 1978 African Cup of Champions Clubs =

Tournament details
- Teams: 24 (from 1 confederation)

Final positions
- Champions: (Cameroon) Canon Yaoundé (2nd title)
- Runners-up: (Guinea) Hafia FC

Tournament statistics
- Matches played: 41
- Goals scored: 107 (2.61 per match)

The 1978 African Cup of Champions Clubs was the 14th edition of the annual international club football competition held in the CAF region (Africa), the African Cup of Champions Clubs. It determined that year's club champion of the association football in Africa.

The tournament was played by 24 teams and was used a playoff scheme with home and away matches. Canon Yaoundé from Cameroon won that final, and became for the second time CAF club champion.

== First round ==
Team 1	Agg.	Team 2	1st leg	2nd leg
Al-Tahaddy (Libya)	5–4	(Ethiopia) Medr Babur	3–1	2–3
AS Corps Enseignement (Madagascar)	1–4	(Lesotho) Matlama FC	1–2	w/o^{1}
ASC Garde Nationale (Mauritania)	5–3	(The Gambia) Wallidan FC	3–1	2–2
Hardware Stars (Malawi)	1–5	(Sudan) Al-Merrikh	1–1	0–4
Kampala City Council FC (Uganda)	3–1	(Somalia) Horseed FC	1–1	2–0
Stade Centrafricain (Central African Republic)	2–4	(Niger) Olympic Niamey	1–3	1–1
Silures Bobo-Dioulasso (Republic of Upper Volta)	10–2	(Guinea-Bissau) Benfica de Bissau	7–0	3–2
Simba SC (Tanzania)	2–1	(Gabon) Vantour Club Mangoungou	2–0	0–1

^{1} AS Corps Enseignement withdrew after the first leg.

== Second round ==
Team 1	Agg.	Team 2	1st leg	2nd leg
Africa Sports (Ivory Coast)	2–4	(Republic of Upper Volta) Silures Bobo-Dioulasso	2–1	1–3
Canon Yaoundé (Cameroon)	3–2	(Sudan) Al-Merrikh	2–0	1–2
Enugu Rangers (Nigeria)	w/o^{1}	(Niger) Olympic Niamey	—	—
Green Buffaloes (Zambia)	1–0	(Lesotho) Matlama FC	1–0	0–0
Hafia FC (Guinea)	6–0	(Mauritania) ASC Garde Nationale	5–0	1–0
JE Tizi Ouzou (Algeria)	3–0	(Libya) Al-Tahaddy	1–0	2–0
Kampala City Council FC (Uganda)	w/o^{1}	(Egypt) Al Ahly	—	—
AS Vita Club (Zaire)	2–0	(Tanzania) Simba SC	1–0	1–0

^{1} Olympic Niamey and Al Ahly SC withdrew.

== Quarter-finals ==
Team 1	Agg.	Team 2	1st leg	2nd leg
Canon Yaoundé (Cameroon)	3–1	(Zambia) Green Buffaloes	2–0	1–1
Enugu Rangers (Nigeria)	4–1	(Uganda) Kampala City Council FC	3–1	1–0
JE Tizi Ouzou (Algeria)	3–3 (a)	(Zaire) AS Vita Club	3–2	0–1
Silures Bobo-Dioulasso (Republic of Upper Volta)	1–8	(Guinea) Hafia FC	0–4	1–4

== Semi-finals ==
Team 1	Agg.	Team 2	1st leg	2nd leg
Canon Yaoundé (Cameroon)	0–0 (6–5 p)	(Nigeria) Enugu Rangers	0–0	0–0
Hafia FC (Guinea)	3–3 (a)	(Zaire) AS Vita Club	2–0	1–3

== Final ==
3 December 1978
--:-- UTC+0

Hafia FC (Guinea)	0–0	(Cameroon) Canon Yaoundé

Stade du 28 Septembre, Conakry
17 December 1978
--:-- UTC+1

Canon Yaoundé (Cameroon)	2–0	(Guinea) Hafia FC
Manga Onguéné (pen.); Mbida

Stade Omnisports, Yaoundé
Referee: Abdelkader Aouissi (Algeria)

== Champion ==
1978 African Cup of Champions Clubs winners
(Cameroon)
Canon Yaoundé
Second title

== Top scorers ==
The top scorers from the 1978 African Cup of Champions Clubs are as follows:

Rank	Name	Team	Goals
1	(Guinea) Seydouba Bangoura	(Guinea) Hafia FC	2
1	(Zaire) Mayanga Maku	(Zaire) AS Vita Club	2
3	(Algeria) Kamel Aouis	(Algeria) JE Tizi Ouzou	1
3	(Algeria) Bachir Douadi	(Algeria) JE Tizi Ouzou	1
3	(Guinea) Amara Touré	(Guinea) Hafia FC	1
3	(Zaire) ... Katshimuka	(Zaire) AS Vita Club	1
3	(Zaire) ... Lupela	(Zaire) AS Vita Club	1
