= BTM Antananarivo =

Malagasy football club

BTM
- Full name: Bankin'ny Tantsaha Mpamokatra Antananarivo
- Ground: Mahamasina Stadium; Antananarivo, Madagascar
- Capacity: 22,000
- League: THB Champions League

Bankin'ny Tantsaha Mpamokatra Antananarivo is a Malagasy football club based in Antananarivo, Madagascar. The team has won the THB Champions League in 1986, qualifying them for the 1987 African Cup of Champions Clubs.

The team currently plays in the Malagasy Second Division.

== Achievements ==
- THB Champions League: 2

1986

== Performance in CAF competitions ==
- CAF Champions League: 1 appearance

1987 African Cup of Champions Clubs - first round
