= SO Emyrne =

Malagasy football club

Stade Olympique Emyrne
- Full name: Stade Olympique de l'Emyrne
- Dissolved: 2006
- Ground: Stade Olympique l'Emyrne, Antananarivo
- League: THB Premier League
- 2006: DNF
| Home colours | Away colours |

Stade Olympique de l'Emyrne was a Malagasy sports club based in Antananarivo, Madagascar. They won the THB Champions League in 2001 and were runners-up in the Coupe de Madagascar in 2003.

SOE's 2002 results were forfeited after the team intentionally scored 149 own goals in a match against AS Adema in protest of a refereeing decision. It was the biggest loss in football history.

== Achievements ==
- Malagasy League: 1

2001
