= 1992 African Cup of Champions Clubs =

Tournament details
- Dates: 1992
- Teams: 42 (from 41 associations)

Final positions
- Champions: (Morocco) Wydad AC (1st title)
- Runners-up: (Sudan) Al-Hilal

Tournament statistics
- Matches played: 61
- Goals scored: 190 (3.11 per match)

The 1992 African Cup of Champions Clubs was the 28th edition of the annual international club football competition held in the CAF region (Africa), the African Cup of Champions Clubs. It determined that year's club champion of association football in Africa.

Wydad AC from Morocco won that final, and became for the first time CAF club champion.

== Preliminary round ==
Team 1	Agg.	Team 2	1st leg	2nd leg
Botswana Defence Force XI	1–2	(Eswatini) Mbabane Highlanders	1–1	0–1
Arsenal FC (Lesotho)	4–0	(Namibia) Eleven Arrows	3–0	1–0
CD Elá Nguema (Equatorial Guinea)	2–3	(Angola) Primeiro de Agosto	2–3	w/o^{1}
LPRC Oilers (Liberia)	2–3	(Sierra Leone) Mighty Blackpool	1–0	1–3
ASC Police (Mauritania)	2–2 (4–5 p)	(Mali) Real Bamako	1–1	1–1
Port Autonome (Senegal)	0–0 (1–3 p)	(Cape Verde) Sporting Praia	0–0	0–0
Saint-George SA (Ethiopia)	2–4	(Libya) Al-Ittihad	2–1	0–3
Saint-Louis FC (Seychelles)	2–7	(Tanzania) Young Africans	1–3	1–4
Sahel SC (Niger)	4–2	(Benin) Postel Sport	2–1	2–1
Tourbillon FC (Chad)	1–1	(Central African Republic) FACA	0–0	1–1

^{1} CD Elá Nguema withdrew after 1st leg.

== First round ==
Team 1	Agg.	Team 2	1st leg	2nd leg
Al-Ittihad (Libya)	1–2	(Kenya) Gor Mahia	1–0	0–2
Arsenal FC (Lesotho)	2–2 (a)	(Uganda) KCC	2–1	0–1
CSMD Diables Noirs (Republic of the Congo)	2–5	(Nigeria) Julius Berger	2–1	0–4
EF Ouagadougou (Burkina Faso)	1–4	(Ivory Coast) ASEC Mimosas	1–2	0–2
Horoya AC (Guinea)	2–2 (5–4 p)	(Tunisia) Espérance de Tunis	2–0	0–2
AS Inter Star (Burundi)	2–3	(Mozambique) Costa do Sol	2–0	0–3
Mbabane Highlanders (Eswatini)	1–9	(Zambia) Nkana Red Devils	0–2	1–7
Mighty Blackpool (Sierra Leone)	3–3 (3–4 p)	(Cameroon) Canon Yaoundé	2–1	1–2
SCOM Mikishi (Zaire)	1–3	(Ghana) Asante Kotoko	1–1	0–2
Primeiro de Agosto (Angola)	3–0	(Gabon) AS Sogara	1–0	2–0
Real Bamako (Mali)	2–3	(Morocco) Wydad AC	2–1	0–2
Sahel SC (Niger)	2–3	(Algeria) MO Constantine	2–1	0–2
Sporting Praia (Cape Verde)	1–3	(Tunisia) Club Africain	0–0	1–3
Sunrise Flacq United (Mauritius)	3–3 (a)	(Madagascar) AS Sotema	2–3	1–0
Tourbillon FC (Chad)	2–2 (a)	(Sudan) Al-Hilal	2–1	0–1
Young Africans (Tanzania)	1–3	(Egypt) Ismaily	0–2	1–1

== Second round ==
Team 1	Agg.	Team 2	1st leg	2nd leg
AS Sotema (Madagascar)	w/o^{1}	(Sudan) Al-Hilal		
Costa do Sol (Mozambique)	2–4	(Ghana) Asante Kotoko	1–2	1–2
Gor Mahia (Kenya)	1–1 (a)	(Cameroon) Canon Yaoundé	0–0	1–1
Horoya AC (Guinea)	1–6	(Ivory Coast) ASEC Mimosas	1–2	0–4
Julius Berger (Nigeria)	1–2	(Morocco) Wydad AC	0–0	1–2
KCC (Uganda)	0–6	(Zambia) Nkana Red Devils	0–4	0–2
MO Constantine (Algeria)	1–1 (2–3 p)	(Egypt) Ismaily	1–0	0–1
Primeiro de Agosto (Angola)	2–3	(Tunisia) Club Africain	2–0	0–3

^{1} AS Sotema withdrew.

== Quarter-finals ==
Team 1	Agg.	Team 2	1st leg	2nd leg
ASEC Mimosas (Ivory Coast)	4–4 (a)	(Ghana) Asante Kotoko	1–2	3–2
Club Africain (Tunisia)	4–6	(Egypt) Ismaily	3–3	1–3
Gor Mahia (Kenya)	2–2 (2–4 p)	(Sudan) Al-Hilal	2–0	0–2
Nkana Red Devils (Zambia)	3–4	(Morocco) Wydad AC	2–1	1–3

== Semi-finals ==
Team 1	Agg.	Team 2	1st leg	2nd leg
ASEC Mimosas (Ivory Coast)	3–3 (a)	(Morocco) Wydad AC	3–1	0–2
Ismaily (Egypt)	1–1 (a)	(Sudan) Al-Hilal	1–1	0–0

== Final ==
29 November 1992
--:-- UTC+1

Wydad AC (Morocco)	2–0	(Sudan) Al-Hilal
Daoudi 87' (pen.); Fertout 90'

Stade Mohamed V, Casablanca
Referee: Jean-Fidèle Diramba (Gabon)
13 December 1992
--:-- UTC+2

Al-Hilal (Sudan)	0–0	(Morocco) Wydad AC

Al-Hilal Stadium, Omdurman

Wydad Casablanca won 2–0 on aggregate.

== Champion ==
1992 African Cup of Champions Clubs Winners
(Morocco)
Wydad
first title

== Top scorers ==
The top scorers from the 1992 African Cup of Champions Clubs are as follows:

Rank	Name	Team	Goals
1	(Zambia) Kenneth Malitoli	(Zambia) Nkana Red Devils	6
2	(Egypt) Yasser Ezzat	(Egypt) Ismaily	4
2	(Ghana) Maxwell Konadu	(Ghana) Asante Kotoko	4
2	(Ivory Coast) Abdoulaye Traoré	(Ivory Coast) ASEC Mimosas	4
2	(Senegal) Moussa N'Daw	(Morocco) Wydad AC	4
2	(Tunisia) Faouzi Rouissi	(Tunisia) Club Africain	4
7	(Ivory Coast) Lucien Kassi-Kouadio	(Ivory Coast) ASEC Mimosas	3
7	(Morocco) Rachid Daoudi	(Morocco) Wydad AC	3
7	(Tunisia) Adel Sellimi	(Tunisia) Club Africain	3
7	(Zambia) Kelvin Mutale	(Zambia) Nkana Red Devils	3
