= Malagasy Football Federation =

Governing body of football in Madagascar

CAF
- Founded: 1961
- Headquarters: Antananarivo
- FIFA affiliation: 1964
- CAF affiliation: 1963
- President: Alfred Randriamanampisoa
- Website: fmf.mg

The Malagasy Football Federation (French: Fédération Malgache de Football, FMF) is the governing body of football in Madagascar. It was founded in 1961, affiliated to FIFA in 1964 and to CAF in 1963. It organizes the national football league and the national team.

On 19 March 2008, the FMF was suspended by FIFA due to "alleged political interference in the running of the sport". On 19 May 2008, the suspension was lifted.

== Performance ==
- 2022 - 3rd place of the African Nations Championship.
