= 1981 African Cup of Champions Clubs =

Tournament details
- Teams: 31 (from 1 confederation)

Final positions
- Champions: (Algeria) JE Tizi Ouzou (1st title)
- Runners-up: (Zaire) AS Vita Club

Tournament statistics
- Matches played: 53
- Goals scored: 145 (2.74 per match)
- Top scorer: (Egypt) Mahmoud El Khatib (6 goals)

The African Cup of Champions Clubs 1981 was the 17th edition of the annual international club football competition held in the CAF region (Africa), the African Cup of Champions Clubs. It determined that years club champion of association football in Africa.

The tournament was played by 31 teams and was used a playoff scheme with home and away matches. JE Tizi Ouzou from Algeria won that final, and became for the first time CAF club champion.

== First round ==
Team 1	Agg.	Team 2	1st leg	2nd leg
AS Kaloum Star (Guinea)	3–1	(The Gambia) Starlight Banjul	2–1	1–0
OC Agaza (Togo)	w/o^{1}	(Guinea-Bissau) Benfica de Bissau	—	—
Al Ahly (Egypt)	4–2	(Kenya) Abaluhya FC	3–1	1–1
Al Ahli Tripoli (Libya)	1–2	(Algeria) JE Tizi Ouzou	0–0	1–2
Asante Kotoko (Ghana)	4–1	(Liberia) Invincible Eleven	3–0	1–1
Dynamos FC (Zimbabwe)	6–1	(Lesotho) Linare FC	5–0	1–1
East End Lions (Sierra Leone)	1–2	(Republic of Upper Volta) Silures Bobo-Dioulasso	1–1	0–1
Horseed FC (Somalia)	w/o^{2}	(Tanzania) Simba SC	—	—
MMM Tamatave (Madagascar)	2–6	(Mozambique) Costa do Sol	2–4	0–2
USM Nziami (Gabon)	1–1 (4–2 p)	(Mali) Real Bamako	1–0	0–1
Nchanga Rangers (Zambia)	5–0	(Eswatini) Mbabane Highlanders	1–0	4–0
Nile Breweries (Uganda)	4–1	(Central African Republic) TP USCA Bangui	2–1	w/o^{3}
Primeiro de Agosto (Angola)	2–3	(Zaire) AS Vita Club	1–1	1–2
SEIB Diourbel (Senegal)	3–3 (3–4 p)	(Ivory Coast) ASEC Mimosas	2–1	1–2
Shooting Stars (Nigeria)	7–3	(Botswana) Township Rollers	7–1	0–2

^{1} Benfica de Bissau withdrew.
^{2} Simba SC withdrew.
^{3} TP USCA Bangui failed to appear for the 2nd leg.

== Second round ==
Team 1	Agg.	Team 2	1st leg	2nd leg
Asante Kotoko (Ghana)	2–4	(Guinea) AS Kaloum Star	1–0	1–3
Canon Yaoundé (Cameroon)	1–3	(Ivory Coast) ASEC Mimosas	0–0	1–3
Costa do Sol (Mozambique)	2–6	(Zambia) Nchanga Rangers	1–3	1–3
Horseed FC (Somalia)	1–4	(Algeria) JE Tizi Ouzou	1–2	w/o^{1}
USM Nziami (Gabon)	2-1	(Togo) OC Agaza	2–0	0–1
Nile Breweries (Uganda)	2–5	(Egypt) Al Ahly	2–0	0–5
Shooting Stars (Nigeria)	1–5	(Zimbabwe) Dynamos FC	1–2	0–3
Silures Bobo-Dioulasso (Republic of Upper Volta)	3–4	(Zaire) AS Vita Club	0–1	3–3

^{1} Horseed FC withdrew after the 1st leg.

== Quarter-finals ==
Team 1	Agg.	Team 2	1st leg	2nd leg
AS Kaloum Star (Guinea)	4–2	(Ivory Coast) ASEC Mimosas	2–1	2–1
JE Tizi Ouzou (Algeria)	5–2	(Zimbabwe) Dynamos FC	3–0	2–2
USM Nziami (Gabon)	1–4	(Egypt) Al Ahly	1–1	0–3
AS Vita Club (Zaire)	4–3	(Zambia) Nchanga Rangers	4–1	0–2

== Semi-finals ==
Team 1	Agg.	Team 2	1st leg	2nd leg
JE Tizi Ouzou (Algeria)	w/o^{1}	(Egypt) Al Ahly	—	—
AS Vita Club (Zaire)	1–0	(Guinea) AS Kaloum Star	1–0	0–0

^{1} Al Ahly were forced to withdraw due to the political and security situation in Egypt following the assassination of Anwar Sadat.

== Final ==
27 November 1981
--:-- UTC+1

JE Tizi Ouzou (Algeria)	4–0	(Zaire) AS Vita Club
Bahbouh 16', 38'; Belahcène 56'; Larbes 65' (pen.)

1st November Stadium, Tizi Ouzou
Attendance: 20 000
Referee: Ali Bin Nasser (Tunisia)
13 December 1981
--:-- UTC+1

AS Vita Club (Zaire)	0–1	(Algeria) JE Tizi Ouzou
		Belahcène 49'

20 May Stadium, Kinshasa
Attendance: 30 000
Referee: Cheikh Djibril MBaye (Senegal)

== Champion ==
1981 African Cup of Champions Clubs winners
(Algeria)
JE Tizi Ouzou
First title

== Top scorers ==
The top scorers from the 1981 African Cup of Champions Clubs are as follows:

Rank	Name	Team	Goals
1	(Egypt) Mahmoud El Khatib	(Egypt) Al Ahly	6
2	(Algeria) Ali Belahcène	(Algeria) JE Tizi Ouzou	5
3	(Egypt) Mohamed Abbas	(Egypt) Al Ahly	4
4	(Algeria) Lyès Bahbouh	(Algeria) JE Tizi Ouzou	3
5	(Zaire) Bobo	(Zaire) AS Vita Club	2
5	(Egypt) Mostafa Younis	(Egypt) Al Ahly	2
5	(Ivory Coast) Lucien Kassi-Kouadio	(Ivory Coast) ASEC Mimosas	2

== Notification ==
JE Tizi Ouzou (Jeunesse Eléctronique de Tizi Ouzou) are now called JS Kabylie (Jeunesse Sportive de Kabylie).
