= 1971 African Cup of Champions Clubs =

Tournament details
- Dates: April - 21 December 1971
- Teams: 25 (from 1 confederation)

Final positions
- Champions: (Cameroon) Canon Yaoundé (1st title)
- Runners-up: (Ghana) Asante Kotoko

Tournament statistics
- Matches played: 44
- Goals scored: 117 (2.66 per match)
- Top scorer: (Ghana) Cecil Jones Attuquayefio (6 goals)

The African Cup of Champions Clubs 1971 was the 7th edition of the annual international club football competition held in the CAF region (Africa), the African Cup of Champions Clubs. It determined that year's club champion of association football in Africa.

The tournament was played by 25 teams and used a knock-out format with ties played home and away. Canon Yaoundé from Cameroon won the final, and became CAF club champion for the first time.

== First round ==
Team 1	Agg.	Team 2	1st leg	2nd leg
Abaluhya United (Kenya)	1–3	(Ghana) Great Olympics	0–0	1–3
Al-Merrikh (Sudan)	2–2 (5–4 p)	(Ethiopia) Tele SC Asmara	2–1	0–1
Canon Yaoundé (Cameroon)	9–4	(Gabon) AS Solidarité	7–3	2–1
ASC Diaraf (Senegal)	3–4	(Mali) Stade Malien	3–0	0–4
Espérance de Tunis (Tunisia)	1–0	(Libya) Al-Ahly Benghazi	0–0	1–0
Maseru United (Lesotho)	3–5	(Madagascar) MMM Tamatave	1–2	2–3
AS Porto Novo (Republic of Dahomey)	0–3	(Republic of the Congo) Victoria Club Mokanda	0–1	0–2
Secteur 6 FC (Niger)	1–2	(Nigeria) Enugu Rangers	1–1	0–1
Young Africans (Tanzania)	2–0	(Somalia) Lavori Publici	2–0	0–0

== Second round ==
Team 1	Agg.	Team 2	1st leg	2nd leg
AS Kaloum Star (Guinea)	4–5	(Nigeria) Enugu Rangers	3–3	1–2
Al-Merrikh (Sudan)	2–2 (4–5 p)	(Ghana) Asante Kotoko	2–1	0–1
Coffee United SC (Uganda)	w/o^{1}	(Tanzania) Young Africans	—	—
Al-Ismaily (Egypt)	w/o^{2}	(Tunisia) Espérance de Tunis	—	—
Stade Malien (Mali)	3–4	(Ivory Coast) ASEC Mimosas	2–2	1–2
MMM Tamatave (Madagascar)	2–8	(Ghana) Great Olympics	2–1	0–7
Victoria Club Mokanda (Republic of the Congo)	1–4	(Togo) Dynamic Togolais	1–2	0–2
AS Vita Club (Zaire)	3–3 (3–4 p)	(Cameroon) Canon Yaoundé	2–0	1–3

^{1} Young Africans withdrew.
^{2} Espérance de Tunis withdrew.

== Quarter-finals ==
Team 1	Agg.	Team 2	1st leg	2nd leg
Coffee United SC (Uganda)	0–2	(Ghana) Great Olympics	0–0	0–2
Dynamic Togolais (Togo)	4–6	(Cameroon) Canon Yaoundé	1–2	3–4
Enugu Rangers (Nigeria)	0–3	(Ivory Coast) ASEC Mimosas	0–1	0–2
Al-Ismaily (Egypt)	1–4	(Ghana) Asante Kotoko	1–1	0–3

== Semi-finals ==
Team 1	Agg.	Team 2	1st leg	2nd leg
ASEC Mimosas (Ivory Coast)	3–5	(Cameroon) Canon Yaoundé	2–1	1–4
Great Olympics (Ghana)	1–2	(Ghana) Asante Kotoko	1–1	0–1

== Final ==
5 December 1971
--:-- UTC+0

Asante Kotoko (Ghana)	0–3	(Cameroon) Canon Yaoundé
Gariba 15', 60'; Essuman

Kumasi Stadium, Kumasi
Referee: Attiogbé (Togo)
19 December 1971
--:-- UTC+1

Canon Yaoundé (Cameroon)	2–0	(Ghana) Asante Kotoko
Léa 57'; Ndoga 87'

Stade militaire de Yaoundé, Yaoundé
Referee: Y. Tessema (Ethiopia)

For the final, only points aggregate, not goals aggregate was considered.

21 December 1971
--:-- UTC+1

Canon Yaoundé (Cameroon)	1–0^{1}	(Ghana) Asante Kotoko
Etemé 72'

Stade militaire de Yaoundé, Yaoundé
Referee: Y. Tessema (Ethiopia)

^{1} The match was abandoned at the 82' with Canon Yaoundé leading 1-0 after Asante Kotoko fans invaded the pitch. Canon Yaoundé were declared champions.

== Champion ==
African Cup of Champions Clubs
1971 Winners

Canon Yaoundé
First Title

== Top scorers ==
The top scorers from the 1971 African Cup of Champions Clubs are as follows:

Rank	Name	Team	Goals
1	(Ghana) Cecil Jones Attuquayefio	(Ghana) Great Olympics	6
2	(Ghana) Abukari Gariba	(Ghana) Asante Kotoko	3
2	(Mali) Lamine "Jules" Traoré	(Mali) Stade Malien	3
4	(Ghana) Peter Lamptey	(Ghana) Great Olympics	2
4	(Mali) Mamadou "Doudou" Diakité	(Mali) Stade Malien	2
