= Coupe de Madagascar =

Football tournament in Madagascar

Telma Coupe de MADAGASCAR
- Teams: 64
- 2025 Coupe de Madagascar

The Coupe de Madagascar is the top knockout tournament in Malagasy football. It was created in 1974.

== Winners ==
- 1974: Fortior Mahajanga
- 1975: Fortior Mahajanga
- 1976: Fortior Mahajanga
- 1977: Fortior Mahajanga
- 1978: AS Sotema
- 1979: AS Sotema
- 1980: AS St. Michel
- 1981: Dinamo Fima
- 1982: AS Sotema
- 1983: Dinamo Fima
- 1984: unknown
- 1985: Fortior Mahajanga
- 1986: HTMF
- 1987: FC BTM
- 1988: FC BFV
- 1989: FC BTM
- 1990: FC BFV
- 1991: FC BTM
- 1992: COSFAP
- 1993: AS Cimelta
- 1994: unknown
- 1995: unknown
- 1996: Club S
- 1997: unknown
- 1998: FC Djivan 2-0 Fortior Mahajanga
- 1999: FC Djivan 3-0 Akon'Ambatomena
- 2000: FC Djivan 1-0 FC Jirama
- 2001: US Transfoot 1-0 AS Fortior
- 2002: AS Fortior 3-0 US Transfoot
- 2003: Léopards de Transfoot 1-0 SO l'Emyrne
- 2004: USJF Ravinala 2-1 USCA Foot
- 2005: USCA Foot 2-1 (a.p.) USJF Ravinala
- 2006: Ajesaia 1-0 USCA Foot
- 2007: AS ADEMA 1-0 USCA Foot
- 2008: AS ADEMA 1-0 Iarivo FC
- 2009: AS ADEMA 2-1 Tana FC Formation
- 2010: AS ADEMA 1-0 (aet) Japan Actuel's FC
- 2011: CNaPS Sport 1-1 (5-4 a.p. tab.) Tana FC Formation
- 2012: TCO Boeny 1-0 AS ADEMA
- 2013: ASSM Elgeco Plus 3-2 AS ADEMA
- 2014: ASSM Elgeco Plus (aet) 3-2 AS ADEMA
- 2015: CNaPS Sport 2-0 AS ADEMA
- 2016: CNaPS Sport 2-1 ASSM Elgeco Plus
- 2017: Fosa Juniors FC 2-1 COSFA Analamanga
- 2018: ASSM Elgeco Plus 2-1 AS ADEMA
- 2019 : Fosa Juniors FC 1-0 CNaPS Sport
- 2020 : cancelled season
- 2021 : CFFA - Andoharanofotsy 3-1 CNaPS Sport
- 2022 : ASSM Elgeco Plus 1-0 Fosa Juniors FC
- 2023 : ASSM Elgeco Plus 2-1 CFFA - Andoharanofotsy
- 2024 : ASSM Elgeco Plus 1-0 CFFA - Andoharanofotsy
- 2025 : ASSM Elgeco Plus 1–0 AS Fanalamanga
