= 1975 African Cup of Champions Clubs =

Tournament details
- Dates: April - 20 December 1975
- Teams: 28 (from 1 confederation)

Final positions
- Champions: (Guinea) Hafia FC (2nd title)
- Runners-up: (Nigeria) Enugu Rangers

Tournament statistics
- Matches played: 47
- Goals scored: 121 (2.57 per match)
- Top scorer: (Guinea) N’Jo Léa (4 goals)

The African Cup of Champions Clubs 1975 was the 11th edition of the annual international club football competition held in the CAF region (Africa), the African Cup of Champions Clubs. It determined that year's club champion of association football in Africa.

The tournament was played by 28 teams and used a knock-out format with ties played home and away. Hafia FC from Guinea won the final, and became CAF club champion for the second time.

== First round ==
Team 1	Agg.	Team 2	1st leg	2nd leg
ASDR Fatima (Central African Republic)	3–2	(Sudan) Al-Merrikh	3–0	0–2^{1}
Bame Monrovia (Liberia)	1–4	(Togo) Lomé I	0–1	1–3
Bata Bullets (Malawi)	w/o^{2}	(Lesotho) Matlama FC	—	—
Djoliba AC (Mali)	3–0	(Sierra Leone) Mighty Blackpool	2–0	1–0
Embassoria (Ethiopia)	1–3	(Burundi) AS Inter Star	1–1	0–2
Express FC (Uganda)	1–0	(Somalia) Horseed FC	1–0	0–0
Great Olympics (Ghana)	1–4	(Nigeria) Enugu Rangers	0–2	1–2
Green Buffaloes (Zambia)	w/o^{2}	(Madagascar) AS Corps Enseignement	—	—
Hafia FC (Guinea)	w/o^{2}	(The Gambia) Real Banjul	—	—
Olympic Niamey (Niger)	1–6	(Ivory Coast) ASEC Mimosas	0–2	1–4
Silures (Republic of Upper Volta)	5–2	(Republic of Dahomey) Etoile Sportive Porto-Novo	3–2	2–0
AS Vita Club (Zaire)	5–1	(Gabon) Petrosport FC	4–0	1–1

^{1} The match was abandoned with Al-Merrikh leading 2–0 after ASDR Fatima walked off the pitch to protest the officiating. ASDR Fatima were ejected from the competition.
^{2} Matlama FC, AS Corps Enseignement and Real Banjul withdrew.

== Second round ==
Team 1	Agg.	Team 2	1st leg	2nd leg
ASEC Mimosas (Ivory Coast)	2–2 (6–5 p)	(Senegal) ASFA Dakar	1–1	1–1
Bata Bullets (Malawi)	2–5	(Zambia) Green Buffaloes	0–2	2–3
CARA Brazzaville (Republic of the Congo)	9–4	(Republic of Upper Volta) Silures	4–0	5–4
Djoliba AC (Mali)	3–4	(Togo) Lomé I	1–1	2–3
Enugu Rangers (Nigeria)	1–1 (a)	(Tanzania) Young Africans	0–0	1–1
Express FC (Uganda)	1–2	(Egypt) Ghazl El Mahalla	1–1	0–1
AS Inter Star (Burundi)	2–4	(Sudan) Al-Merrikh	0–0	2–4
AS Vita Club (Zaire)	2–3	(Guinea) Hafia FC	2–0	0–3

== Quarter-finals ==
Team 1	Agg.	Team 2	1st leg	2nd leg
ASEC Mimosas (Ivory Coast)	2–3	(Togo) Lomé I	1–0	1–3
CARA Brazzaville (Republic of the Congo)	2–2 (3–4 p)	(Guinea) Hafia FC	2–0	0–2
Green Buffaloes (Zambia)	3–4	(Nigeria) Enugu Rangers	2–2	1–2
Ghazl El Mahalla (Egypt)	2–1	(Sudan) Al-Merrikh	2–1	0–0

== Semi-finals ==
Team 1	Agg.	Team 2	1st leg	2nd leg
Hafia FC (Guinea)	4–2	(Togo) Lomé I	3–1	1–1
Ghazl El Mahalla (Egypt)	3–4	(Nigeria) Enugu Rangers	3–1	0–3

== Final ==
7 December 1975
--:-- UTC+0

Hafia FC (Guinea)	1–0	(Nigeria) Enugu Rangers
N’Jo Léa 20'

Stade du 28 Septembre, Conakry

Hafia FC	Enugu Rangers

20 December 1975
--:-- UTC+1

Enugu Rangers (Nigeria)	1–2	(Guinea) Hafia FC
Obianika 20' (pen.)		Petit Sory ?'; Tolo 88' (pen.)

Surulere Stadium, Lagos

Enugu Rangers	Hafia FC

== Champion ==
African Cup of Champions Clubs
1975 Winners
(Guinea)
Hafia FC
Second title

== Top scorers ==
The top scorers from the 1975 African Cup of Champions Clubs are as follows:

Rank	Name	Team	Goals
1	(Guinea) N’Jo Léa	(Guinea) Hafia FC	4
2	(Egypt) Mohamed El-Seyagui	(Egypt) Ghazl El Mahalla	3
2	(Guinea) Petit Sory	(Guinea) Hafia FC	3
2	(Guinea) Tolo	(Guinea) Hafia FC	3
5	(Nigeria) Kenneth Abana	(Nigeria) Enugu Rangers	2
5	(Nigeria) Ogidi Ibeabuchi	(Nigeria) Enugu Rangers	2
5	(Nigeria) Alex Nwosu	(Nigeria) Enugu Rangers	2
5	(Nigeria) Mathias Obianika	(Nigeria) Enugu Rangers	2
5	(Nigeria) Stanley Okoronkwo	(Nigeria) Enugu Rangers	2
