= 1983 African Cup of Champions Clubs =

Tournament details
- Teams: 36 (from 1 confederation)

Final positions
- Champions: (Ghana) Asante Kotoko (2nd title)
- Runners-up: (Egypt) Al Ahly

Tournament statistics
- Matches played: 68
- Goals scored: 164 (2.41 per match)
- Top scorer: (Egypt) Mahmoud El Khatib (6 goals)

The 1983 African Cup of Champions Clubs was the 19th edition of the annual international club football competition held in the CAF region (Africa), the African Cup of Champions Clubs. It determined that year's club champion of association football in Africa.

The tournament was played by 36 teams and was used a playoff scheme with home and away matches. Asante Kotoko SC from Ghana won that final, and became for the second time CAF club champion.

== Preliminary round ==
Team 1	Agg.	Team 2	1st leg	2nd leg
ASC Diaraf (Senegal)	6–0	(The Gambia) Ports Authority	4–0	2–0
Maniema Fantastique (Burundi)	2–2 (a)	(Central African Republic) Olympic Real de Bangui	2–1	0–1
Mbabane Highlanders (Eswatini)	3–1	(Botswana) Township Rollers	2–1	1–0
ASC Police (Mauritania)	1–4	(Sierra Leone) Sierra Fisheries	1–3	0–1

== First round ==
Team 1	Agg.	Team 2	1st leg	2nd leg
AS Bilima (Zaire)	8–5	(Togo) AC Semassi	5–1	3–4
Africa Sports (Ivory Coast)	0–0 (0–3 p)	(Senegal) ASC Diaraf	0–0	0–0
Al Ahly (Egypt)	1–0	(Sudan) Al-Merrikh	1–0	0–0
Al-Ahli Tripoli (Libya)	0–3	(Algeria) JE Tizi Ouzou	0–1	0–2
CARA Brazzaville (Republic of the Congo)	8–1	(Equatorial Guinea) Dragón FC	6–1	2–0
Canon Yaoundé (Cameroon)	2–1	(Benin) Dragons de l'Ouémé	2–0	0–1
Djoliba (Mali)	0–1	(Guinea) Hafia FC	0–0	0–1
Dynamos (Zimbabwe)	5–4	(Kenya) AFC Leopards	5–1	0–3
Enugu Rangers (Nigeria)	0–2	(Sierra Leone) Sierra Fisheries	0–1	0–1
FC 105 Libreville (Gabon)	1–4	(Ghana) Asante Kotoko	1–2	0–2
KAC Kenitra (Morocco)	w/o^{1}	(Guinea-Bissau) Benfica de Bissau	—	—
Matlama FC (Lesotho)	2–5	(Mozambique) Ferroviário de Maputo	1–2	1–3
SC Villa (Uganda)	5–3	(Madagascar) Dinamo Fima	4–2	1–1
Nkana Red Devils (Zambia)	3–2	(Eswatini) Mbabane Highlanders	2–2	1–0
Petro Atlético (Angola)	6–3	(Central African Republic) Olympic Real de Bangui	3–1	3–2
Wagad FC (Somalia)	1–2	(Tanzania) Pan African FC	1–2	0–0

^{1} Benfica de Bissau withdrew.

== Second round ==
Team 1	Agg.	Team 2	1st leg	2nd leg
AS Bilima (Zaire)	2–1	(Sierra Leone) Sierra Fisheries	1–0	1–1
Al Ahly (Egypt)	6–2	(Zimbabwe) Dynamos	4–1	2–1
CARA Brazzaville (Republic of the Congo)	3–4	(Ghana) Asante Kotoko	3–2	0–2
Ferroviário de Maputo (Mozambique)	1–5	(Uganda) SC Villa	1–2	0–3
JE Tizi Ouzou (Algeria)	0–1	(Senegal) ASC Diaraf	0–1	0–0
KAC Kenitra (Morocco)	4–0	(Guinea) Hafia FC	4–0	0–0
Nkana Red Devils (Zambia)	0–0 (4–2 p)	(Tanzania) Pan African FC	0–0	0–0
Petro Atlético (Angola)	3–4	(Cameroon) Canon Yaoundé	0–0	3–4

== Quarter-finals ==
Team 1	Agg.	Team 2	1st leg	2nd leg
Al Ahly (Egypt)	5–1	(Cameroon) Canon Yaoundé	5–0	0–1
Asante Kotoko (Ghana)	3–2	(Zaire) AS Bilima	3–0	0–2
KAC Kenitra (Morocco)	2–3	(Senegal) ASC Diaraf	1–1	1–2
Nkana Red Devils (Zambia)	5–2	(Uganda) SC Villa	4–0	1–2

== Semi-finals ==
Team 1	Agg.	Team 2	1st leg	2nd leg
ASC Diaraf (Senegal)	2–3	(Ghana) Asante Kotoko	2–1	0–2
Nkana Red Devils (Zambia)	0–2	(Egypt) Al Ahly	0–0	0–2

== Final ==
27 November 1983
--:-- UTC+2

Al Ahly (Egypt)	0 – 0	(Ghana) Asante Kotoko

Cairo International Stadium, Cairo
Attendance: 90,000
Referee: Edwin Picon-Ackong (Mauritius)
11 December 1983
--:-- UTC+0

Asante Kotoko (Ghana)	1 – 0	(Egypt) Al Ahly
Nti 22'

Kumasi Sports Stadium, Kumasi
Attendance: 50,000
Referee: Mohamed Hansal (Algeria)

== Champion ==
1983 African Cup of Champions Clubs winners
(Ghana)
Asante Kotoko
Second title

== Top scorers ==
The top scorers from the 1983 African Cup of Champions Clubs are as follows:

Rank	Name	Team	Goals
1	(Egypt) Mahmoud El Khatib	(Egypt) Al Ahly	6
2	(Angola) Jesus	(Angola) Petro Atlético	4
3	(Egypt) Zakaria Nassef	(Egypt) Al Ahly	3
4	(Algeria) Ali Fergani	(Algeria) JE Tizi Ouzou	2
4	(Angola) Luke	(Angola) Petro Atlético	2
