= Dinamo Fima =

Football club

- Full name: Dinamo Fima
- Ground: Mahamasina Stadium; Antananarivo, Madagascar
- Capacity: 22,000
- League: THB Champions League

Dinamo Fima is a Malagasy football club based in Antananarivo, Madagascar. The team has won the THB Champions League in 1982 and 1983. The team currently plays in the Malagasy Second Division.

== Achievements ==
- THB Champions League

Champion (2): 1982, 1983

- Coupe de Madagascar

Winner (2): 1981, 1983

== Performance in CAF competitions ==
- CAF Champions League: 1 appearance

1983 – First round
