= BCC Lions F.C. =

Nigerian football club

BCC Lions FC
- Full name: Benue Cement Co. Lions Football Club
- Founded: 1982; 44 years ago
- Ground: J. S. Tarka Stadium; Gboko, Nigeria
- Capacity: 15,000
- Chairman: Aliko Dangote
- Manager: Andrew Agu
- League: Nigeria Amateur League

BCC Lions Football Club (Benue Cement Company Lions Football Club) was a Nigerian football team based in Gboko, Benue State. It competed at various levels in the Nigerian League system, including the Nigeria Amateur League and the Nigeria Professional League, gaining glory at some periods until its decline and eventual phasing out. Its home games were played at the Joseph Sarwuan Tarka Stadium. Some efforts made to resuscitate the team proved fruitless.

== History ==
BCC Lions was founded in 1982 by the Benue State government, under Aper Aku, the first civilian governor of the state. Chuks Aningo was the team's first coach. A British expat John Steele, an electrical engineer and employee of Cementia from Liverpool managed and progressed the team in its early years often playing himself. In later years, Aningo would serve as the team's manager. At the time, he was employed by Benue Cement Company.

BCC Lions was the first team in Northern Nigeria to win the Nigeria Challenge Cup (now known as the Nigeria FA Cup) in 1989. The game was played at Abubakar Tafawa Balewa Stadium, Bauchi, and the only goal of the match was scored by Aham Nwankwo. The club went on to win the 1993, 1994, 1997 editions of the Challenge Cup as well.

After winning the Challenge Cup, the next year the club won the Mandela Cup as well in 1990. During the early 1990s, BCC Lions were one of the dominant teams in the league, peaking with the double in 1994.

They were relegated from the Nigerian Premier League in 1998 by two points, and were unable to regain their former glory. After spending six years in the lower division, they slowly lost their fan base and financial support. Despite a 2.5 million naira boost from Benue State governor George Akume in 2002 and another million from Guilder Brewing two years later, the team was disbanded, not even showing up for their 2004 FA Cup first round game against Shooting Stars F.C. An attempt to resurrect the team began in November 2007. Dangote, also chairman of the BCC board, announced 110 million naira for the team to participate in the 2008/09 season. They were relegated after finishing 13th.

== Honours ==
=== Domestic ===
- Nigerian Premier League
  - Winners (1): 1994
- Nigerian FA Cup
  - Winners (4): 1989, 1993, 1994, 1997

=== Continental ===
- African Cup Winners' Cup
  - Winners (1): 1990

== Performance in CAF competitions ==
- African Cup of Champions Clubs: 1 appearance

1995 – Second Round

- CAF Cup Winners' Cup: 4 appearances

1990 – Champion
1991 – Finalist
1994 – Quarter-Finals
1998 – First Round
