= Super Coupe de Madagascar =

The Super Coupe de Madagascar is a football competition that brings together the champions of the THB Champions League and the winners of the Coupe de Madagascar.

== Participants ==
- The winner of the THB Champions League, which is the top-tier football league in Madagascar.
- The victor of the Coupe de Madagascar, the premier knockout tournament in Malagasy football.

== Format ==
The competition is typically a single match where the two teams face off to determine the ultimate champion.

== Historical Winners ==
- 1994: AS Cimelta
- 2006: AS Adema (defeated Ajesaia 1-0)
- 2007: Ajesaia (drew 1-1 with AS Adema)
- 2008: AS ADEMA (Antananarivo) (won 4-2 against Académie Ny Antsika after extra time)
- 2009: Ajesaia (won 1-0 against AS ADEMA after extra time)
- 2010: CNaPS Sport (defeated AS ADEMA 3-2)
