= Malagasy Pro League =

Coca-Cola Pureplay Football League
- Founded: 1962
- Country: Madagascar
- Confederation: CAF
- Number of clubs: 12
- Level on pyramid: 1
- Domestic cup(s): Coupe de Madagascar; Super Coupe de Madagascar
- International cup(s): Champions League; Confederation Cup
- Current champions: CFFA (Andoharanofotsy) (2025-26)
- Most championships: CNaPS Sport (7)
- Website: pro-league.mg
- Current: Orange Proleague 2026-26

The PFL Championnat de Football National Division 1, known as the Coca-Cola Pureplay Football League for sponsorship reasons, is the premier association football league in Madagascar. Prior to 2019, it was known as the Three Horses Beer-sponsored THB Champions League and then the Orange Pro League.

In 2024, it was rebranded as the Coca-Cola Pureplay Football League, again for sponsorship reasons.

The highest-scoring football match in history occurred in Madagascar in 2002 when SO I’Emyrne scored 149 own goals in protest of a refereeing decision.

== Format ==
1962-2019:

The competition is played in a round-robin format between the 24 qualifying clubs from the 22 regional leagues in the country. In the first round, the teams are divided into four groups of six teams, with each team playing the others once, and with the top three clubs of each group advancing to the next round. In the second round, the teams are divided into two groups of six teams, with each team playing the others once, and with the top two clubs of each group advancing to the final round. In the final round, called the Groupe des As, the four teams play each other twice and the winner is crowned as the champion.

Late 2019-present:

In October 2019, the competition evolved to be a more professional league comprising 12 teams. Each team square off against each other twice (1 home match and 1 away) during the course of the season. The team having the most points at the end of the season becomes Malagasy champions.

From December 2019, the competition became known as Orange Pro League Madagascar due to sponsorship reasons.

== Current clubs (season 2022/2023) ==
=== Northern Group ===
- Fosa Juniors FC (Mahajanga)
- COSFA (Antananarivo)
- AS Fanalamanga (Alaotra-Mangoro)
- AJESAIA (Itaosy)
- USCA Foot (Antananarivo)
- TFFC (Tsaramandroso)
- Tia Kitra FC (Toamasina)
- ASA -Association Sportive d'Ambondrona (Diana)

=== Southern Group ===
- CFFA (Andoharanofotsy)
- ASSM Elgeco Plus (Analamanga)
- ASJFC Capricorne (Atsimo-Andrefana)
- Mama FCA (Ilakaka)
- Disciples FC (Antsirabe)
- Zanakala FC (Fianarantsoa)
- JET Kintana (Antananarivo)
- DATO FC (Farafangana)
- 3FB Toliara (Toliara)

== 2024 edition (Pureplay Football league) ==
1/2 finals, 1st round:

- ASSM Elgeco Plus vs. 3FB Toliara 1 : 0
- Zanakala FC vs. Disciples FC 3 : 2

=== Finals ===
- Disciples FC : ASSM Elgeco Plus 0:0 (1:0 prolongation)

== Previous winners ==
Years	Champions
1962	AS Fortior (1)
1963	AS Fortior (2)
1964	COSFAP (1)
1965	COSFAP (2)
1966	COSFAP (3)
1967	Racing Club (1)
1968	FS Firegnina (1)
1969	USCA Foot (1)
1970	MMM Toamasina (1)
1971	AS Saint Michel (1)
1972	Fortior Club de la Côte Ouest (1)
1973	JS Antalaha (1)
1974	AS Corps Enseignement (1)
1975	AS Corps Enseignement (2)
1976	Not held
1977	AS Corps Enseignement (3)
1978	AS Saint Michel (2)
1979	Fortior Club de la Côte Ouest (2)
1980	MMM Toamasina (2)
1981	AS Somasud (1)
1982	Dinamo Fima (1)
1983	Dinamo Fima (2)
1984	Not held
1985	AS Sotema (1)
1986	Bankin' ny Tantsaha Mpamokatra (1)
1987	Jos Nosy-Bé (1)
1988	COSFAP (4)
1989	AS Sotema (2)
1990	ASF Fianarantsoa (1)
1991	AS Sotema (3)
1992	AS Sotema (4)
1993	Bankin' ny Tantsaha Mpamokatra (2)
1994	FC Rainizafy (1)
1995	FC Fobar (1)
1996	FC Banky Fampadrosoana ny Varotra (1)
1997	Domoina Soavina Atsimondrano (1)
1998	Domoina Soavina Atsimondrano (2)
1999	AS Fortior (3)
2000	AS Fortior (4)
2001	Stade olympique de l'Emyrne (1)
2002	AS Adema (1)
2003	Ecoredipharm FC (1)
2004	USJF Ravinala (1)
2005	USCA Foot (2)
2006	AS Adema (2)
2007	Ajesaia (1)
2008	Académie Ny Antsika (1)
2009	Ajesaia (2)
2010	CNaPS Sport (1)
2011	Japan Actuel's FC (1)
2012	AS Adema (3)
2013	CNaPS Sport (2)
2014	CNaPS Sport (3)
2015	CNaPS Sport (4)
2016	CNaPS Sport (5)
2017	CNaPS Sport (6)
2018	CNaPS Sport (7)
2019	Fosa Juniors FC (1)
2020	Not finished
2021	AS Adema (4)
2022	Centre de formation d'Andoharanofotsy (1)
2023	Fosa Juniors FC (2)
2024	Disciples FC
2025	ASSM Elgeco Plus (3)

== Performance by club ==
Club	City	Titles	Last title
CNaPS Sport	Miarinarivo	7	2018
AS Fortior	Toamasina	4	2000
AS Sotema	Mahajanga	4	1992
AS Adema	Antananarivo	4	2021
AS Corps Enseignement	Toliara	3	1977
ASSM Elgeco Plus	Antananarivo	3	2025
Ajesaia	Antananarivo	2	2009
Dinamo Fima	Antananarivo	2	1983
DSA Antananarivo	Antananarivo	2	1998
Fortior Mahajanga	Mahajanga	2	1979
Fosa Juniors	Mahajanga	2	2022
MMM Toamasina	Toamasina	2	1980
BTM Antananarivo	Antananarivo	2	1986
Académie Ny Antsika	Vakinankaratra	1	2008
FC BFV	Antananarivo	1	1996
Ambatondrazaka Sport		1	1956
CFFA	Andoharanofotsy	1	2023
JS Antalaha	Antalaha	1	1973
COSFAP Antananarivo	Antananarivo	1	1988
Disciples FC	Vakinankaratra	1	2024
Ecoredipharm	Tamatave	1	2003
ASF Fianarantsoa	Fianarantsoa	1	1990
Fitarikandro	Fianarantsoa	1	1968
Fobar	Toliara	1	1995
Japan Actuel's FC	Analamanga	1	2011
Jos Nosy-Bé	Hell-Ville	1	1987
FC Rainizafy		1	1994
AS Somasud	Toliara	1	1981
SO l'Emyrne	Antananarivo	1	2001
USCA Foot	Antananarivo	1	2005
US Fonctionnaires	Antananarivo	1	1969
USJF/Ravinala	Antananarivo	1	2004

== Top goalscorers ==
Season	Country	Goalscorer	Team	Goals
2014	(Madagascar)	Njiva Rakotoharimalala	CNaPS Sport	
2015	(Madagascar)	Elvi Brunat Baritoa	Prescot	11
2016	(Madagascar)	Lucien Kassimo	CNaPS Sport	
2021-22	(Madagascar)	Tsilavina Fanamezantsoa Razanokoto	Fosa Juniors	10
2021-22	(Madagascar)	Fenohasina Gilles Razafimaro	Ajesaia	10
2022-23	(Madagascar)	Toky Rakotondrave	COSFA	7
2023-24	(Madagascar)	Reginot Rakotonirina	Tsaramandroso	5
2023-24	(Madagascar)	Jean Andrianantenaina	Dato	5
