= Bridge F.C. =

Nigerian football club

Bridge Football Club
- Full name: Bridge Football Club
- Nickname: Bridge Boys
- Founded: 1976; 50 years ago
- Ground: Agege Stadium
- Capacity: 4,000
- Chairman: Adebanjo Shalom
- Manager: Danmola Lateef
- League: Metro Pro League
- Website: bridgefcng.com
Home colours	Away colours

Bridge Football Club is a Nigerian football club based in Lagos that was founded in 1976. As a result of its association with the Julius Berger construction company, the club was known as Julius Berger Football Club until 2010. The club has won national championships and competed internationally. Players such as Odion Ighalo, David Adekola, Yakubu, Taribo West, Sunday Oliseh, Samson Siasia, Emmanuel Amuneke, Rashidi Yekini, Garba Lawal, and Mutiu Adepoju have played for the club.

== History ==
Until 2006, the club played in the Nigerian Premier League, but their owners announced plans to close the club by 2008. However, outgoing chairman of the board of directors Mobolaji Johnson (a former governor of Lagos State) said in August 2008 that the company had steadied their finances and were prepared to fully fund the team in 2008–09.

They played their final 2008 home games at the University of Lagos after Onikan Stadium was shut down for the rest of the season. Berger temporarily relocated to Abeokuta for two years in 2004.

In July 2010, the team was bought by seven private individuals led by Emmanuel Ibru. The club was renamed "Bridge Football Club". Bridge Football Club featured in the Nigerian National League (NNL) in the 2010–2011 and 2011–2012 seasons and finished 3rd and 4th, respectively. The club has a staff strength of over 70, including players and coaches of their academy 'BRF Academy'.

However, in Dec. 2012 just before the 2012 Nigeria National League season the team tried to sell their league slot to Ekiti-based Fountain F.C. They withdrew from the league when the sale fell through. This left their future participation in Nigerian football in doubt, but they participated in the 2013 Lagos State Federation Cup and joined the Lagos-based Private Professional Football League 'Metro Pro League' for the 2013/2014 season and finished second (2nd) in the maiden season of the elite private professional football league.

== Achievements ==
- Nigerian Premier League: 2

1991, 2000.

- Nigerian FA Cup: 2

1996, 2002.

- Nigerian Super Cup: 2

2000, 2002.

- Metro Pro League: 2013/2014

2nd Position

== Performance in CAF competitions ==
- CAF Champions League: 2 appearances

2001 – Group Stage
2004 – First Round

- African Cup of Champions Clubs: 1 appearance

1992: Second Round

- CAF Cup Winners' Cup: 3 appearances

1995 – Finalist
1997 – Second Round
2003 – Finalist

== Sources ==
Further reading

- Berger Accept Omoruyi's Resignation
- Julius Berger To Reposition Bridge Boys
- Amuneke Bags Berger Job
- Why I left Berger- Amuneke
- Two clubs opt out of NNL (Supersport.com) 23–12–12
- Metro Pro League
