= List of CAF Cup finals =

- Founded: 1992
- Abolished: 2004
- Region: Africa (CAF)
- Teams: 32 (first round); 2 (finalists)
- Last champions: (Morocco) Raja Casablanca (1st title)
- Most championships: (Algeria) JS Kabylie (3 titles)

The CAF Cup was a seasonal association football competition established in 1992 and abolished and merged with the African Cup Winners' Cup to form the CAF Confederations Cup in 2004. The CAF Cup was open to the domestic leagues runners-up of member associations who have not qualified to one of the two pre-existing CAF international club competitions the African Cup of Champions Clubs or the African Cup Winners' Cup.

== List of finals ==
Key
Match was won on an away goals

- The "Year" column refers to the season the competition was held, and wikilinks to the article about that season.
- Finals are listed in the order they were played.

List of CAF Cup finals
Year	Country	Home team	Score	Away team	Country	Venue	Attendance
1992	Uganda	SC Villa	0–0	Shooting Stars	Nigeria	National Stadium, Kampala	
1992	Nigeria	Shooting Stars	3–0	SC Villa	Uganda	Liberty Stadium, Ibadan	
1992	Shooting Stars won 3–0 on aggregate						
1993	Ivory Coast	Stella Club d'Adjamé	0–0	Simba SC	Tanzania	Stade Félix Houphouët-Boigny, Abidjan	
1993	Tanzania	Simba SC	0–2	Stella Club d'Adjamé	Ivory Coast	William Mkapa Stadium, Dar es Salaam	
1993	Stella Club d'Adjamé won 2–0 on aggregate						
1994	Angola	Primeiro de Maio	1–0	Bendel Insurance	Nigeria	Estádio Municipal, Benguela	
1994	Nigeria	Bendel Insurance	3–0	Primeiro de Maio	Angola	Samuel Ogbemudia Stadium, Benin City	
1994	Bendel Insurance won 3–1 on aggregate						
1995	Guinea	AS Kaloum Star	0–0	ES Sahel	Tunisia	Stade du 28 Septembre, Conakry	
1995	Tunisia	ES Sahel	2–0	AS Kaloum Star	Guinea	Stade Olympique de Sousse, Sousse	
1995	ES Sahel won 2–0 on aggregate						
1996	Tunisia	ES Sahel	3–1	Kawkab Marrakech	Morocco	Stade Olympique de Sousse, Sousse	20,000
1996	Morocco	Kawkab Marrakech	2–0	ES Sahel	Tunisia	Stade El Harti, Marrakesh	15,000
1996	Kawkab Marrakech won by the away goal (3–3 on aggregate)						
1997	Angola	Petro Atlético	1–0	ES Tunis	Tunisia	Estádio da Cidadela, Luanda	
1997	Tunisia	ES Tunis	2–0	Petro Atlético	Angola	Stade El Menzah, Tunis	45,000
1997	ES Tunis won 2–1 on aggregate						
1998	Senegal	ASC Jeanne d'Arc	0–1	CS Sfaxien	Tunisia	Stade Leopold Senghor, Dakar	15,000
1998	Tunisia	CS Sfaxien	3–0	ASC Jeanne d'Arc	Senegal	Stade Taïeb Mhiri, Sfax	16,000
1998	CS Sfaxien won 4–0 on aggregate						
1999	Tunisia	ES Sahel	1–0	Wydad Casablanca	Morocco	Stade Olympique de Sousse, Sousse	
1999	Morocco	Wydad Casablanca	2–1	ES Sahel	Tunisia	Stade Larbi Zaouli, Casablanca	
1999	ES Sahel won by the away goal (2–2 on aggregate)						
2000	Egypt	Ismaily	1–1	JS Kabylie	Algeria	Ismailia Stadium, Ismaïlia	25,000
2000	Algeria	JS Kabylie	0–0	Ismaily	Egypt	Stade du 5 Juillet, Algiers	90,000
2000	JS Kabylie won by the away goal (1–1 on aggregate)#						
2001	Tunisia	ES Sahel	2–1	JS Kabylie	Algeria	Stade Olympique de Sousse, Sousse	
2001	Algeria	JS Kabylie	1–0	ES Sahel	Tunisia	Stade du 5 Juillet, Algiers	80,000
2001	JS Kabylie won by the away goal (2–2 on aggregate)#						
2002	Algeria	JS Kabylie	4–0	Tonnerre Yaoundé	Cameroon	Stade du 5 Juillet, Algiers	80,000
2002	Cameroon	Tonnerre Yaoundé	1–0	JS Kabylie	Algeria	Ahmadou Ahidjo Stadium, Yaoundé	30,000
2002	JS Kabylie won 4–1 on aggregate						
2003	Morocco	Raja Casablanca	2–0	Coton Sport	Cameroon	Stade Mohamed V, Casablanca	80,000
2003	Cameroon	Coton Sport	0–0	Raja Casablanca	Morocco	Roumdé Adjia Stadium, Garoua	25,000
2003	Raja Casablanca won 2–0 on aggregate						

== Performances ==
=== By club ===
Team	Winners	Runners-up	Years won	Years runners-up
(Algeria) JS Kabylie	3	0	2000, 2001, 2002	-
(Tunisia) Étoile du Sahel	2	2	1995, 1999	1996, 2001
(Nigeria) Shooting Stars	1	0	1992	-
(Ivory Coast) Stella Club d'Adjamé	1	0	1993	-
(Nigeria) Bendel Insurance	1	0	1994	-
(Morocco) Kawkab Marrakech	1	0	1996	-
(Tunisia) Espérance	1	0	1997	-
(Tunisia) CS Sfaxien	1	0	1998	-
(Morocco) Raja Casablanca	1	0	2003	-
(Uganda) Villa SC	0	1	-	1992
(Tanzania) Simba SC	0	1	-	1993
(Angola) Primeiro de Maio	0	1	-	1994
(Guinea) AS Kaloum Star	0	1	-	1995
(Angola) Petro de Luanda	0	1	-	1997
(Senegal) ASC Jeanne d'Arc	0	1	-	1998
(Morocco) Wydad Casablanca	0	1	-	1999
(Egypt) Ismaily	0	1	-	2000
(Cameroon) Tonnerre Yaoundé	0	1	-	2002
(Cameroon) Cotonsport Garoua	0	1	-	2003

=== By country ===
County	Winners	Runners-up	Winning clubs	Runners-up
Tunisia	4	2	Étoile du Sahel (2), Espérance (1), CS Sfaxien (1)	Étoile du Sahel (2)
Algeria	3	0	JS Kabylie (3)	-
Morocco	2	1	Kawkab Marrakech (1), Raja Casablanca (1)	Wydad Casablanca (1)
Nigeria	2	0	Bendel Insurance (1), Shooting Stars (1)	-
Ivory Coast	1	0	Stella Club d'Adjamé (1)	-
Angola	0	2	-	Primeiro de Maio (1), Petro de Luanda (1)
Cameroon	0	2	-	Cotonsport Garoua (1), Tonnerre Yaoundé (1)
Uganda	0	1	-	Villa SC (1)
Tanzania	0	1	-	Simba SC (1)
Guinea	0	1	-	AS Kaloum Star (1)
Senegal	0	1	-	ASC Jeanne d'Arc (1)
Egypt	0	1	-	Ismaily (1)
