= Moses Nsereko =

Ugandan football player, manager, and executive (died 1991)

Personal information
- Date of death: 15 September 1991
- Place of death: Kololo, Kampala, Uganda
- Position: Midfielder

Youth career
- Kampala City Council

Senior career*
Years	Team	Apps	(Gls)
1970–1984	Kampala City Council		

International career
1973–1982	Uganda		

Managerial career
- 1979–1987: Kampala City Council
- * Club domestic league appearances and goals

Moses Nsereko (died 15 September 1991) was a Ugandan football player, manager, and executive. During his playing career as a midfielder, he played for the Uganda national team at the 1976 and 1978 African Cup of Nations.

== Club and managerial career ==
Nsereko joined Kampala City Council (KCC) as a ball boy in the late 1960s, but regularly featured for the club's second team. It wasn't until 1970 that he was able to wear the "famous" yellow jersey of KCC. By 1971, he was a starter on KCC's team. Initially deployed as right winger by coach Jaberi Bidandi Ssali, Nsereko shifted in his favoured central midfield role with time. As a player at KCC, he helped the club win the Uganda National League in 1976 and 1977, and the CECAFA Club Cup in 1978.

In 1979, Nsereko was named player-coach at KCC following the departure of Bidandi Ssali. As a player-coach and head coach at KCC, Nsereko won the Uganda Super League in 1981, 1983, and 1985, and the Uganda Cup in 1979, 1980, 1982, and 1984. After a disappointing 1986 season, he resigned in 1987.

== International career ==
Nsereko was a youth international before playing for the Uganda national team. He made eight appearances and scored one goal for Uganda at the 1976 and 1978 African Cup of Nations, and was selected in the latter tournament's Team of the Tournament after reaching the final. Nsereko won the CECAFA Cup in 1973, 1976, and 1977; he missed the final penalty in a shoot-out defeat to Tanzania in the 1974 competition.

== Executive career ==
In April 1989, Nsereko was voted General Secretary of the Federation of Uganda Football Associations (FUFA). Under the leadership of President John Semanobe, he worked to create football structures. Thanks to the revamp of youth football development, the Uganda national team won back-to-back CECAFA Cup titles in 1989 and 1990. Nsereko held his position at FUFA until his death in 1991.

== Death ==
On 15 September 1991, Nsereko was brutally murdered outside his home at Wampewo flats in Kololo, Kampala. The unknown gunmen were never brought to justice. Nsereko left behind two widows and over seven children.

Nsereko's death sent shock waves throughout Ugandan football and particularly KCC supporters.

== Honours ==
Kampala City Council

- Uganda Super League: 1976, 1977, 1981, 1983, 1985
- Uganda Cup: 1979, 1980, 1982, 1984; runner-up: 1983, 1985
- CECAFA Club Cup: 1978

Uganda

- CECAFA Cup: 1973, 1976, 1977; runner-up: 1974
- African Cup of Nations runner-up: 1978

Individual

- African Cup of Nations Team of the Tournament: 1978
