= Algerian football clubs in African competitions =

Football clubs from Algerian Ligue Professionnelle 1 (Algeria) have been the most successful in Africa. since 1970, twenty-four Algerian clubs have evolved into African competitions. They can participate each year according to their results during the previous season in the various national competitions, during the sixties no Algerian club engages. The African football competitions are relatively recent and that there was only the African Cup of Champion Clubs, the first edition of which dates from 1964. This can be explained first by the fact that at that time most African countries recently gained independence. Everyone was not at the same level in terms of football, on the other hand there were also other football competitions whose geographical scope was restricted and represented only part of the African continent. These well established since the early sixties, the continental dimension of a test was still difficult to admit and tolerate, moreover the first editions will be organized and won by countries in the center and East of the continent African.

Several Algerian clubs have participated in these competitions, some even several times, but only JS Kabylie and ES Setif have crossed the symbolic threshold of 100 matches in African Cups, it is also the two most titled clubs with 7 and 3 titles respectively, in addition to the C1, JS Kabylie has the particularity of being the only Algerian team to have also won the C2 and the C3 (competition that no longer exists), only the CAF Confederation Cup and the African Football League misses its list. ES Setif for its part and the only team that won the C1 new formula launched since 1997. JS Kabylie with its thirty participations in all competitions is the club with the most participations before ES Setif, which has fourteen. the period that began with the victory of MC Algiers in 1976) until the late eighties (victory of JS Kabylie in 1990), is the most prolific for the Algerian clubs that won four titles and achieved two finals. This period will see even Algerian football achieve three consecutive finals in African Cup champion clubs in 1988, 1989 and 1990.

Then it's nothingness, some clubs will frequently reach the quarter-finals see the semi-finals of an African competition; while others will make episodic appearances where only the participation seems to be their results. Despite the unrest that Algeria experienced (the "black decade" of the Algerian Civil War), his football succeeds somehow to survive even if it regresses somewhat. This is partly due to the good results of JS Kabylie who managed during the nineties to stay at the level of his rivals Maghreb, chaining a victory in 1990 in the Champions Clubs' Cup (and a half final lost in 1996), a victory in the African Cup of football cup winners in 1995 as well as a participation in a CAF Super Cup in 1996.

== Overview ==
=== African Cup of Champions Clubs / CAF Champions League ===
==== African Cup of Champions Clubs ====
PR : Preliminary round, FR : First round, SR : Second round, TR : Third round, QF : Quarter-finals, SF : Semi-finals, RU : Runners-up, W : Winners

Team	1970	1976	1977	1978	1979	1980	1981	1982	1983	1984	1985
JS Kabylie	–	–	–	QF	–	–	W	FR	SR	SF	–
MC Alger	–	W	QF	–	SR	QF	–	–	–	–	–
RC Kouba	–	–	–	–	–	–	–	QF	–	–	–
GC Mascara	–	–	–	–	–	–	–	–	–	–	QF
CR Belouizdad	FR	–	–	–	–	–	–	–	–	–	–
Team	1986	1987	1988	1989	1990	1991	1992	1993	1994	1995	1996
JS Kabylie	SR	–	–	–	W	SR	–	–	–	–	SF
MC Oran	–	–	–	RU	–	–	–	QF	SF	–	–
ES Sétif	–	SR	W	–	–	–	–	–	–	–	–
MO Constantine	–	–	–	–	–	–	SR	–	–	–	–
US Chaouia	–	–	–	–	–	–	–	–	–	SR	–

==== CAF Champions League ====
PR : Preliminary round, FR : First round, SR : Second round, GS : Group stage, QF : Quarter-finals, SF : Semi-finals, RU : Runners-up, W : Winners, Disqualified

Team	1997	1998	1999	2000	2001	2002	2003	2004	2005	2006	2007	2008	2009	2010	2011	2012
USM Alger	GS	–	–	–	–	–	SF	GS	SR	FR	PR	–	–	–	–	–
ES Sétif	–	–	–	–	–	–	–	–	–	–	–	FR	–	GS	SR	–
JS Kabylie	–	–	–	–	–	–	–	–	FR	GS	GS	SR	FR	SF	–	–
MC Alger	–	–	–	FR	–	–	–	–	–	–	–	–	–	–	GS	–
CS Constantine	–	FR	–	–	–	–	–	–	–	–	–	–	–	–	–	–
CR Belouizdad	–	–	–	–	GS	FR	–	–	–	–	–	–	–	–	–	–
ASO Chlef	–	–	–	–	–	–	–	–	–	–	–	–	FR	–	–	GS
JSM Béjaïa	–	–	–	–	–	–	–	–	–	–	–	–	–	–	–	FR
USM El Harrach	–	–	SR	–	–	–	–	–	–	–	–	–	–	–	–	–
Team	2013	2014	2015	2016	2017	2018	2019	2020	2021	2022	2023	2024	2025	2026		
USM Alger	–	–	RU	–	SF	–	–	GS	–	–	–	–	–	–		
ES Sétif	SR	W	GS	GS	–	SF	–	–	–	QF	–	–	–	–		
JS Kabylie	–	–	–	–	–	–	–	GS	–	–	QF	–	–	GS		
MC Alger	–	–	–	–	–	GS	–	–	QF	–	–	–	QF	GS		
CS Constantine	–	–	–	–	–	–	QF	–	–	–	–	FR	–	–		
CR Belouizdad	–	–	–	–	–	–	–	–	QF	QF	QF	GS	GS	–		
JS Saoura	–	–	–	–	PR	–	GS	–	–	–	–	–	–	–		
JSM Béjaïa	SR	–	–	–	–	–	–	–	–	–	–	–	–	–		
MC El Eulma	–	–	GS	–	–	–	–	–	–	–	–	–	–	–		
MO Béjaïa	–	–	–	SR	–	–	–	–	–	–	–	–	–	–		

==== Statistics by club ====
As of 3 June 2023

#	Team	Q	Pld	W	D	L	GF	GA	GD	Best finish
1	JS Kabylie	17	122	62	21	39	152	103	+49	Winners
2	ES Sétif	12	94	40	27	27	146	108	+38	Winners
3	USM Alger	9	80	37	19	24	132	82	+50	Runners-up
4	MC Alger	8	60	25	14	21	94	76	+18	Winners
5	CR Belouizdad	6	50	20	11	19	61	52	−9	Quarter-finals
6	MC Oran	3	24	13	2	9	37	27	+10	Runners-up
7	CS Constantine	2	14	6	3	5	16	14	+2	Quarter-finals
8	ASO Chlef	2	14	5	5	4	17	15	+2	Group stage
9	MC El Eulma	1	12	3	2	7	10	15	−5	Group stage
10	JS Saoura	2	12	4	5	3	11	11	+0	Group stage
11	JSM Béjaïa	2	10	2	5	3	8	8	+0	Second round
12	GC Mascara	1	6	2	1	3	7	8	−1	Quarter-finals
13	MO Béjaïa	1	6	2	1	3	5	7	−3	Second round
14	RC Kouba	1	6	2	1	3	6	10	−4	Quarter-finals
15	MO Constantine	1	4	2	1	1	4	3	+1	Second round
16	USM El Harrach	1	4	2	0	2	8	7	+1	Second round
17	US Chaouia	1	4	2	0	2	3	4	−1	Second round

=== CAF Confederation Cup ===
PR : Preliminary round, FR : First round, SR : Second round, PoR : Play-off round, GS : Group stage, QF : Quarter-finals, SF : Semi-finals, RU : Runners-up, W : Winners

Team	2004	2005	2006	2007	2008	2009	2010	2011	2012	2013	2014	2015	2016	2017	2018	2019	2020
ES Sétif	–	–	–	–	–	RU	–	PoR	FR	GS	–	–	–	–	–	–	–
MC Alger	–	–		FR	FR	–	–	–	–	–	–	PR	–	QF	–	–	–
CR Belouizdad	FR	–	–	–	–	–	PoR	–	–	–	–	–	–	–	PoR	–	FR
USM Alger	–	PoR	–	–	–	–	–	–	–	SR	–	–	–	–	QF	–	–
JS Kabylie	–	–	–	–	GS	–	–	GS	–	–	–	–	–	PoR	–	–	–
JSM Béjaïa	–	–	–	–	FR	SR	–	–	–	PoR	–	–	–	–	–	–	–
ASO Chlef	–	–	FR	SR	–	–	–	–	–	–	–	SR	–	–	–	–	–
NA Hussein Dey	–	–	PoR	–	–	–	–	–	–	–	–	–	–	–	–	GS	–
MC Oran	–	SR	–	–	–	–	–	–	–	–	–	–	SR	–	–	–	–
CS Constantine	–	–	–	–	–	–	–	–	–	–	SR	–	SR	–	–	–	–
MO Béjaïa	–	–	–	–	–	–	–	–	–	–	–	–	RU	–	–	–	–
Paradou AC	–	–	–	–	–	–	–	–	–	–	–	–	–	–	–	–	GS
CA Batna	–	–	–	–	–	–	–	PR	–	–	–	–	–	–	–	–	–
USM Bel Abbès	–	–	–	–	–	–	–	–	–	–	–	–	–	–	–	FR	–
Team	2021	2022	2023	2024	2025	2026											
ES Sétif	GS	–	–	–	–	–											
JS Kabylie	RU	PoR	–	–	–	–											
JS Saoura	–	GS	SR	–	–	–											
USM Alger	–	–	W	SF	QF	W											
ASO Chlef	–	–	–	FR	–	–											
CS Constantine	–	–	–	–	SF	–											
CR Belouizdad	–	–	–	–	–	SF											

=== African Cup Winners' Cup ===
PR : Preliminary round, FR : First round, SR : Second round, TR : Third round, QF : Quarter-finals, SF : Semi-finals, RU : Runners-up, W : Winners, Disqualified.

Team	1977	1978	1979	1980	1981	1982	1983	1984	1985	1986	1987	1988	1989	1990
USM Alger	–	–	–	–	–	QF	–	–	–	–	–	–	QF	–
MC Alger	–	–	–	–	–	–	–	SR	–	–	–	–	–	–
MO Constantine	SR	–	–	–	–	–	–	–	–	–	–	–	–	–
NA Hussein Dey	–	RU	–	SF	–	–	–	–	–	–	–	–	–	–
CR Belouizdad	–	–	QF	–	–	–	–	–	–	–	–	–	–	–
MC Oran	–	–	–	–	–	–	–	–	SR	SR	–	–	–	–
ES Sétif	–	–	–	–	QF	–	–	–	–	–	–	–	–	–
DNC Alger	–	–	–	–	–	–	QF	–	–	–	–	–	–	–
WKF Collo	–	–	–	–	–	–	–	–	–	–	SR	–	–	–
USM El Harrach	–	–	–	–	–	–	–	–	–	–	–	FR	–	–
RC Relizane	–	–	–	–	–	–	–	–	–	–	–	–	–	FR
Team	1991	1992	1993	1994	1995	1996	1997	1998	1999	2000	2001	2002	2003	
USM Alger	–	–	–	–	–	–	–	QF	–	FR	–	SF	–	
JS Kabylie	–	–	QF	–	W	–	–	–	–	–	–	–	–	
NA Hussein Dey	–	–	–	SR	–	–	–	–	–	–	–	–	–	
CR Belouizdad	–	–	–	–	–	SF	–	–	–	–	–	–	–	
MC Oran	–	–	–	–	–	–	QF	–	–	–	–	–	–	
ES Sétif	SF	–	–	–	–	–	–	–	–	–	–	–	–	
USM Bel Abbès	–	SR	–	–	–	–	–	–	–	–	–	–	–	
WA Tlemcen	–	–	–	–	–	–	–	–	FR	–	–	–	FR	
CR Béni Thour	–	–	–	–	–	–	–	–	–	–	SR	–	–	

== Algerian clubs in African Finals ==
=== African Cup of Champions Clubs / CAF Champions League ===
Year	Home team	Score	Away team	Venue	Attendance
1976	(Guinea) Hafia FC	3–0	(Algeria) MC Alger	Stade du 28 Septembre, Conakry	30,000
1976	(Algeria) MC Alger	3–0	(Guinea) Hafia FC	Stade 5 Juillet, Algiers	80,000
1976	MC Alger won 4–1 on penalties (3–3 on aggregate)*				
1981	(Algeria) JE Tizi-Ouzou	4–0	(Zaire) Vita Club	Stade 1er Novembre, Tizi-Ouzou	20,000
1981	(Zaire) Vita Club	0–1	(Algeria) JE Tizi-Ouzou	Stade du 20 Mai, Kinshasa	30,000
1981	JE Tizi-Ouzou won 5–0 on aggregate				
1988	(Nigeria) Iwuanyanwu Nationale	1–0	(Algeria) Entente de Sétif	Liberty Stadium, Ibadan	25,000
1988	(Algeria) Entente de Sétif	4–0	(Nigeria) Iwuanyanwu Nationale	Stade 17 Juin, Constantine	55,000
1988	Entente de Sétif won 4–1 on aggregate				
1989	(Morocco) Raja Casablanca	1–0	(Algeria) MC Oran	Stade Mohamed V, Casablanca	50,000
1989	(Algeria) MC Oran	1–0	(Morocco) Raja Casablanca	Stade 19 Juin, Oran	45,000
1989	Raja Casablanca won 4–2 on penalties (1–1 on aggregate)*				
1990	(Algeria) JS Kabylie	1–0	(Zambia) Nkana Red Devils	Stade 5 Juillet, Algiers	70,000
1990	(Zambia) Nkana Red Devils	1–0	(Algeria) JS Kabylie	Independence Stadium, Lusaka	35,000
1990	JS Kabylie won 5–3 on penalties (1–1 on aggregate)*				
2014	(Democratic Republic of the Congo) AS Vita Club	2–2	(Algeria) ES Sétif	Stade Tata Raphaël, Kinshasa	40,000
2014	(Algeria) ES Sétif	1–1	(Democratic Republic of the Congo) AS Vita Club	Stade Mustapha Tchaker, Blida	35,000
2014	ES Sétif won by the away goal (3–3 on aggregate)^{#}				
2015	(Algeria) USM Alger	1–2	(Democratic Republic of the Congo) TP Mazembe	Stade Omar Hamadi, Algiers	15.000
2015	(Democratic Republic of the Congo) TP Mazembe	2–0	(Algeria) USM Alger	Stade TP Mazembe, Lubumbashi	18.000
2015	TP Mazembe won 4–1 on aggregate				

=== CAF Confederation Cup ===
Year	Home team	Score	Away team	Venue	Attendance
2009	(Algeria) ES Setif	2–0	(Mali) Stade Malien	Stade 8 Mai 1945, Setif	25,000
2009	(Mali) Stade Malien	2–0	(Algeria) ES Setif	Stade Modibo Kéïta, Bamako	35,000
2009	Stade Malien won 3–2 on penalties (2–2 on aggregate)*				
2016	(Algeria) MO Béjaïa	1–1	(Democratic Republic of the Congo) TP Mazembe	Stade de l'Unité Maghrébine, Béjaïa	15,000
2016	(Democratic Republic of the Congo) TP Mazembe	4–1	(Algeria) MO Béjaïa	Stade TP Mazembe, Lubumbashi	18,000
2016	TP Mazembe won 5–2 on aggregate				
2020–21	(Morocco) Raja Casablanca	2–1	(Algeria) JS Kabylie	Stade de l'Amitié, Cotonou	0 (close doors)
2022–23	(Tanzania) Young Africans	1–2	(Algeria) USM Alger	National Stadium, Dar es Salaam	
2022–23	(Algeria) USM Alger	0–1	(Tanzania) Young Africans	Stade du 5 Juillet, Algiers	
2022–23	USM Alger won on away goals				
2025–26	(Algeria) USM Alger	1–0	(Egypt) Zamalek	Stade du 5 Juillet, Algiers	50,000
2025–26	(Egypt) Zamalek	1–0	(Algeria) USM Alger	Cairo International Stadium, Cairo	46,200
2025–26	USM Alger won 8–7 on penalties (1–1 on aggregate)*				

=== CAF Super Cup ===
Year	Home team	Score	Away team	Venue	Attendance	Notes
1996	(South Africa) Orlando Pirates ^{CL}	1 – 0	(Algeria) JS Kabylie ^{CWC}	FNB Stadium	20,000	
2015	(Algeria) ES Sétif ^{CL}	1 – 1	(Egypt) Al Ahly ^{CAF}	Stade Mustapha Tchaker	15,000	

=== CAF Cup (defunct) ===
Year	Home team	Score	Away team	Venue	Attendance
2000; Details	(Egypt) Ismaily SC	1 – 1	(Algeria) JS Kabylie	Ismailia Stadium, Ismaïlia	25,000
2000; Details	(Algeria) JS Kabylie	0 – 0	(Egypt) Ismaily SC	Stade 5 Juillet, Algiers	90,000
2000; Details	JS Kabylie won by away goal after 1 – 1 on aggregate				
2001; Details	(Tunisia) ES Sahel	2 – 1	(Algeria) JS Kabylie	Stade Olympique de Sousse, Sousse	
2001; Details	(Algeria) JS Kabylie	1 – 0	(Tunisia) ES Sahel	Stade 5 Juillet, Algiers	80,000
2001; Details	JS Kabylie won by away goal after 2 – 2 on aggregate				
2002; Details	(Algeria) JS Kabylie	4 – 0	(Cameroon) Tonnerre KC Yaoundé	Stade 5 Juillet, Algiers	80,000
2002; Details	(Cameroon) Tonnerre KC Yaoundé	1 – 0	(Algeria) JS Kabylie	Stade Ahmadou Ahidjo, Yaoundé	30,000
2002; Details	JS Kabylie won 4 – 1 on aggregate				

=== African Cup Winners' Cup (defunct) ===
Year	Home team	Score	Away team	Venue	Attendance
1978; Details	(Algeria) MA Hussein Dey	1 – 3	(Guinea) Horoya AC	Stade 5 Juillet, Algiers	
1978; Details	(Guinea) Horoya AC	2 – 1	(Algeria) MA Hussein Dey	Stade du 28 Septembre, Conakry	
1978; Details	Horoya AC won 5 – 2 on aggregate				
1995; Details	(Nigeria) Julius Berger FC	1 – 1	(Algeria) JS Kabylie	Lagos National Stadium, Surulere	
1995; Details	(Algeria) JS Kabylie	2 – 1	(Nigeria) Julius Berger FC	Stade 5 Juillet, Algiers	45,000
1995; Details	JS Kabylie won 3 – 2 on aggregate				

=== Afro-Asian Club Championship (defunct) ===
Year	Home team	Score	Away team	Venue	Attendance
1989	(Algeria) ES Sétif	2–0	(Qatar) Al-Sadd	Stade 17 Juin, Constantine	
1989	(Qatar) Al-Sadd	1–3	(Algeria) ES Sétif	Jassim Bin Hamad Stadium, Doha	
1989	ES Sétif won 5–1 on aggregate				

=== African Super Cup (non-CAF competition) ===
The 1982 African Super Cup is a match which took place on January 25, 1982 during the Tournament of Fraternity in Abidjan, Ivory Coast. JE Tizi-Ouzou (JS Kabylie) won this trophy against the Cameroonians of Union Douala. The newspaper France Football commented on this event of the birth of the brand new African Super Cup.

Date	Team name	Score	Team name	Venue	References
25 January 1982	(Algeria) JE Tizi-Ouzou ^{1981 CL winner}	1–1 (JE Tizi-Ouzou wins 4–3 on penalties)	(Cameroon) Union Douala ^{1981 CWC winner}	Felix Houphouet Boigny Stadium (Abidjan, Ivory Coast)	

== African achievements ==
=== Total standings of African Cup participations (1963 to 2025–26) ===
As of 16 May 2026

Pos.	Team	Pld	W	D	L	GF	GA	Win%	CSC		CCL		CCWC		CAC		CCC	
Pos.	Team	Pld	W	D	L	GF	GA	Win%	Pa.	Pld	Pa.	Pld	Pa.	Pld	Pa.	Pld	Pa.	Pld
1	JS Kabylie	216	105	41	70	274	190	48.61	1	1	18	128	2	14	4	28	5	45
2	USM Alger	182	87	45	50	279	168	47.8	1	1	9	80	5	25	1	6	7	70
3	ES Sétif	145	61	37	47	219	162	42.07	1	1	12	94	2	12	−	−	5	36
4	CR Belouizdad	108	47	26	35	132	102	43.52	−	−	8	66	2	10	−	−	5	32
5	MC Alger	106	43	26	37	142	112	40.57	−	−	10	82	1	4	−	−	4	20
6	MC Oran	48	19	10	19	70	52	39.58	−	−	3	20	3	12	2	8	2	8
7	CS Constantine	40	21	5	14	52	44	52.5	−	−	3	16	−	−	−	−	3	24

=== Trophies ===
#	Team	CCL	CAC	CCWC	CCC	CSC	AACC	Total
1	JS Kabylie	2	3	1	-	-	-	6
2	ES Sétif	2	-	-	-	1	1	4
3	USM Alger	-	-	-	2	1	-	3
4	MC Alger	1	-	-	-	-	-	1

=== Non-CAF competition ===
The 1982 African Super Cup is a match which took place on January 25, 1982 during the Tournament of Fraternity in Abidjan, Ivory Coast. JS Kabylie won this trophy against the Cameroonians of Union Douala. This African trophy won by JSK is one of the seven African titles won in its history.
