= List of CAF club competition winners =

The Confederation of African Football (CAF) is the governing body for association football in Africa. It organizes three club competitions: the CAF Champions League (formerly African Cup of Champions Clubs), the CAF Confederation Cup and the CAF Super Cup. CAF was also responsible for the African Cup Winners' Cup and the CAF Cup, until their merging in 2004 when Confederation Cup took their places.

Egyptian side Al Ahly have won a record total of 26 titles in CAF competitions, including 12 CAF Champions League titles – the most by any club – as well as four African Cup Winners’ Cups, one Confederation Cup, and eight Super Cups. Before the launch of the CAF Confederation Cup in 2004, the only club to have won all three major CAF competitions was Espérance Sportive de Tunis (Tunisia), who completed the treble with the Champions Cup in 1994, the CAF Cup in 1997, and the Cup Winners’ Cup in 1998. They became the first team to win the set of CAF’s three historic seasonal tournaments. This feat was later matched by JS Kabylie (Algeria) in 2000 and Étoile Sportive du Sahel (Tunisia) in 2007—the latter also became the only club to win all five different CAF men’s club competitions: the Champions League, Confederation Cup, Super Cup, Cup Winners’ Cup, and CAF Cup. Moroccan clubs are the most successful from North Africa after Egypt, with 25 CAF titles, while Tunisian clubs follow closely.

Club World Cup and FIFA Intercontinental Cup is not included in this list because it's a FIFA competitions.

== Men's Winners ==
=== By club ===
Al Ahly have a record of 12 CAF Champions League titles, a record of 4 African Cup Winners' Cup titles and a record of 8 CAF Super Cup titles. JS Kabylie have a record of 3 CAF Cup titles. CS Sfaxien and RS Berkane have a record of 3 CAF Confederation Cup titles.

Until the first CAF Confederation Cup final in 2005, Espérance Sportive de Tunis was the only team to win every CAF club competitions.

Key

CL	African Cup of Champions Clubs or CAF Champions League
CWC	African Cup Winners' Cup (defunct)
C	CAF Cup (defunct)
CC	CAF Confederation Cup
SC	CAF Super Cup
AAC	Afro-Asian Club Championship (defunct)
AFL	African Football League (defunct)

List of CAF club competition winners
Club	Country	CL	CWC	C	CC	SC	AAC	AFL	Total
Al Ahly	Egypt	12	4	0	1	8	1	0	26
Zamalek	Egypt	5	1	0	2	5	2	0	15
TP Mazembe	Democratic Republic of the Congo	5	1	0	2	3	0	0	11
Raja Casablanca	Morocco	3	0	1	2	2	1	0	9
Étoile Sportive du Sahel	Tunisia	1	2	2	2	2	0	0	9
Espérance Sportive de Tunis	Tunisia	4	1	1	0	1	1	0	8
Wydad AC	Morocco	3	1	0	0	1	1	0	6
JS Kabylie	Algeria	2	1	3	0	0	0	0	6
Canon Yaoundé	Cameroon	3	1	0	0	0	0	0	4
Enyimba	Nigeria	2	0	0	0	2	0	0	4
ES Sétif	Algeria	2	0	0	0	1	1	0	4
CS Sfaxien	Tunisia	0	0	1	3	0	0	0	4
RS Berkane	Morocco	0	0	0	3	1	0	0	4
Mamelodi Sundowns	South Africa	2	0	0	0	1	0	1	4
Hafia	Guinea	3	0	0	0	0	0	0	3
El Mokawloon	Egypt	0	3	0	0	0	0	0	3
Africa Sports	Ivory Coast	0	2	0	0	1	0	0	3
Hearts of Oak	Ghana	1	0	0	1	1	0	0	3
USM Alger	Algeria	0	0	0	2	2	0	0	4
Asante Kotoko	Ghana	2	0	0	0	0	0	0	2
Union Douala	Cameroon	1	1	0	0	0	0	0	2
Shooting Stars	Nigeria	0	1	1	0	0	0	0	2
Club Africain	Tunisia	1	0	0	0	0	1	0	2
FAR Rabat	Morocco	1	0	0	1	0	0	0	2
Orlando Pirates	South Africa	1	0	0	0	1	0	0	2
ASEC Mimosas	Ivory Coast	1	0	0	0	1	0	0	2
Pyramids FC	Egypt	1	0	0	0	1	0	0	2
MAS Fez	Morocco	0	0	0	1	1	0	0	2
Oryx Douala	Cameroon	1	0	0	0	0	0	0	1
Stade d'Abidjan	Ivory Coast	1	0	0	0	0	0	0	1
Ismaily	Egypt	1	0	0	0	0	0	0	1
Vita Club	Democratic Republic of the Congo	1	0	0	0	0	0	0	1
CARA Brazzaville	Republic of the Congo	1	0	0	0	0	0	0	1
Tonnerre Yaoundé	Cameroon	0	1	0	0	0	0	0	1
MC Alger	Algeria	1	0	0	0	0	0	0	1
Enugu Rangers	Nigeria	0	1	0	0	0	0	0	1
Horoya	Guinea	0	1	0	0	0	0	0	1
Gor Mahia	Kenya	0	1	0	0	0	0	0	1
Bizertin	Tunisia	0	1	0	0	0	0	0	1
Al-Merrikh	Sudan	0	1	0	0	0	0	0	1
Lions	Nigeria	0	1	0	0	0	0	0	1
Power Dynamos	Zambia	0	1	0	0	0	0	0	1
Stella d'Adjamé	Ivory Coast	0	0	1	0	0	0	0	1
Bendel Insurance	Nigeria	0	0	1	0	0	0	0	1
Motema Pembe	Democratic Republic of the Congo	0	1	0	0	0	0	0	1
Kawkab Marrakech	Morocco	0	0	1	0	0	0	0	1
Kaizer Chiefs	South Africa	0	1	0	0	0	0	0	1
Stade Malien	Mali	0	0	0	1	0	0	0	1
FUS Rabat	Morocco	0	0	0	1	0	0	0	1
Léopards	Republic of Congo	0	0	0	1	0	0	0	1

=== Non-CAF competition ===
The 1982 African Super Cup is a match which took place on January 25, 1982 during the Tournament of Fraternity in Abidjan, Ivory Coast. The Kabyles of JS Kabylie won this trophy against the Cameroonians of Union Douala.

=== By country ===
The following table lists all the countries whose clubs have won at least one CAF competition. Egyptian clubs are the most successful, with a total of 47 titles. Egyptian clubs hold a record number of wins in the African Cup of Champions Clubs/CAF Champions League (19), the African Cup Winners' Cup (8), the CAF Super Cup (14) and the Afro-Asian Club Championship (3). In second place, Moroccan clubs have secured 25 titles and they have the most victories in the CAF Confederation Cup (8). In third place overall Tunisian clubs have 24 titles and they have the most victories in the CAF Cup (4).

Key

CL	African Cup of Champions Clubs or CAF Champions League
CWC	African Cup Winners' Cup (defunct)
C	CAF Cup (defunct)
CC	CAF Confederation Cup
SC	CAF Super Cup
AAC	Afro-Asian Club Championship (defunct)
AFL	African Football League (defunct)

List of CAF club competition winners by country
Nationality	CL	CWC	C	CC	SC	AAC	AFL	Total
Egypt	19	8	0	3	14	3	0	47
Morocco	7	1	2	8	5	2	0	25
Tunisia	6	4	4	5	3	2	0	24
Algeria	5	1	3	2	3	1	0	15
Democratic Republic of the Congo	6	2	0	2	3	0	0	13
Nigeria	2	3	2	0	2	0	0	9
Cameroon	5	3	0	0	0	0	0	8
South Africa	3	1	0	0	2	0	1	7
Ivory Coast	2	2	1	0	2	0	0	7
Ghana	3	0	0	1	1	0	0	5
Guinea	3	1	0	0	0	0	0	4
Republic of the Congo	1	0	0	1	0	0	0	2
Kenya	0	1	0	0	0	0	0	1
Sudan	0	1	0	0	0	0	0	1
Zambia	0	1	0	0	0	0	0	1
Mali	0	0	0	1	0	0	0	1

=== By region ===
Key

CL	African Cup of Champions Clubs or CAF Champions League
CWC	African Cup Winners' Cup (defunct)
C	CAF Cup (defunct)
CC	CAF Confederation Cup
SC	CAF Super Cup
AAC	Afro-Asian Club Championship (defunct)
AFL	African Football League (defunct)

List of CAF club competition winners by region
Federation (Region)	CL	CWC	C	CC	SC	AAC	AFL	Total
UNAF (North Africa)	37	14	9	18	25	8	0	111
WAFU (West Africa)	10	6	3	2	5	0	0	26
UNIFFAC (Central Africa)	12	5	0	3	2	0	0	22
COSAFA (Southern Africa)	3	2	0	0	2	0	1	8
CECAFA (East Africa)	0	2	0	0	0	0	0	2

== Women's Winners ==
=== By club ===
The following clubs are the top clubs in CAF competitions.

Club	Titles	Trophies won
(Morocco) AS FAR	3	3 CAF Women's Champions League
(South Africa) Mamelodi Sundowns	2	2 CAF Women's Champions League
(Democratic Republic of the Congo) TP Mazembe	1	1 CAF Women's Champions League

=== By country ===
Key

WCL	CAF Champions League

List of CAF club competition winners by country
Nationality	WCL	Total
Morocco	3	3
South Africa	2	2
Democratic Republic of the Congo	1	1

=== By region ===
Key

WCL	CAF Champions League

List of CAF club competition winners by region
Federation (Region)	WCL	Total
UNAF (North Africa)	3	3
COSAFA (Southern Africa)	2	2
UNIFFAC (Central Africa)	1	1

== See also ==
- CAF Champions League
- CAF Women's Champions League
- African Cup Winners' Cup
- CAF Cup
- CAF Confederation Cup
- CAF Super Cup
- Afro-Asian Club Championship
- African Football League
