= Haruna Lukwago =

Ugandan footballer

Haruna Lukwago (born 6th Nov 2004 ) is a Ugandan professional footballer who plays as a defender for Kampala Capital City Authority Football Club as Centre-back.

== Early life ==
Lukwago was born in Mbale City in Eastern Uganda, he later on went to be freshman at Red River FC.

== Club career ==
Born in Mbale, Haruna began his career with Kampala Capital City Authority Football Club in Kampala and later join California Baptist Lancers.

== See also ==
- Kampala Capital City Authority FC
- Enock Walusimbi
