= Moses Muchenje =

Zimbabwean footballer (born 1991)

Personal information
- Full name: Moses Tapiwanashe Muchenje
- Date of birth: 16 December 1991 (age 34)
- Place of birth: Harare, Zimbabwe
- Height: 1.68 m (5 ft 6 in)
- Position: Midfielder

Team information
- Current team: Harare City

Senior career*
Years	Team	Apps	(Gls)
2011–2012	Gunners		
2013–2017	CAPS United		
2018–	Harare City		

International career^{‡}
2017	Zimbabwe	1	(0)
- * Club domestic league appearances and goals as of 14 November 2020 ‡ National team caps and goals as of 14 November 2020

Moses Muchenje (born 16 December 1991) is a Zimbabwean football midfielder who plays for Harare City.
