= 1978 Uganda National League =

Football season in Uganda

Uganda National League
- Season: 1978
- Champions: Simba FC
- Top goalscorer: Jimmy Kirunda, Kampala City Council FC (32)

The 1978 Uganda National League was the 11th season of the Ugandan football championship, the top-level football league of Uganda.

== Overview ==
The 1978 Uganda National League was contested by 15 teams and was won by Simba FC, while Uganda Police FC and Black Rhino were relegated.

== League standings ==
| Pos | Team | Pld | W | D | L | GF | GA | GD | Pts | Qualification or relegation |
|---|---|---|---|---|---|---|---|---|---|---|
| 1 | Simba FC (C) | 28 | 20 | 7 | 1 | 62 | 13 | +49 | 47 | Champions |
| 2 | Kampala City Council FC | 28 | 19 | 4 | 5 | 76 | 23 | +53 | 42 | |
| 3 | Nile Breweries FC | 28 | 16 | 8 | 4 | 46 | 24 | +22 | 40 | |
| 4 | Coffee SC | 28 | 14 | 11 | 3 | 49 | 26 | +23 | 39 | |
| 5 | Uganda Commercial Bank | 28 | 15 | 5 | 8 | 42 | 28 | +14 | 35 | |
| 6 | Nytil FC | 27 | 13 | 6 | 8 | 31 | 26 | +5 | 32 | |
| 7 | Nsambya Old Timers | 28 | 12 | 5 | 11 | 45 | 35 | +10 | 29 | |
| 8 | Maroons FC | 28 | 12 | 3 | 13 | 51 | 44 | +7 | 27 | |
| 9 | Mbarara | 28 | 9 | 7 | 12 | 45 | 49 | −4 | 25 | |
| 10 | Kilembe Mines FC | 28 | 7 | 7 | 14 | 35 | 51 | −16 | 21 | |
| 11 | NIC | 28 | 8 | 4 | 16 | 25 | 42 | −17 | 20 | |
| 12 | Lint Marketing Board | 28 | 7 | 5 | 16 | 24 | 47 | −23 | 19 | |
| 13 | AT Millers | 28 | 7 | 4 | 17 | 21 | 45 | −24 | 18 | |
| 14 | Uganda Police FC (R) | 28 | 4 | 9 | 15 | 24 | 44 | −20 | 17 | Relegated |
| 15 | Black Rhino (R) | 26 | 2 | 2 | 22 | 23 | 99 | −76 | 8 (Note: 2 bonus points? Incorrect number of matches played?) | Relegated |

(C) Champions; (R) Relegated

== Leading goalscorer ==
The top goalscorer in the 1978 season was Jimmy Kirunda of Kampala City Council FC with 32 goals.
