= CAF Cup =

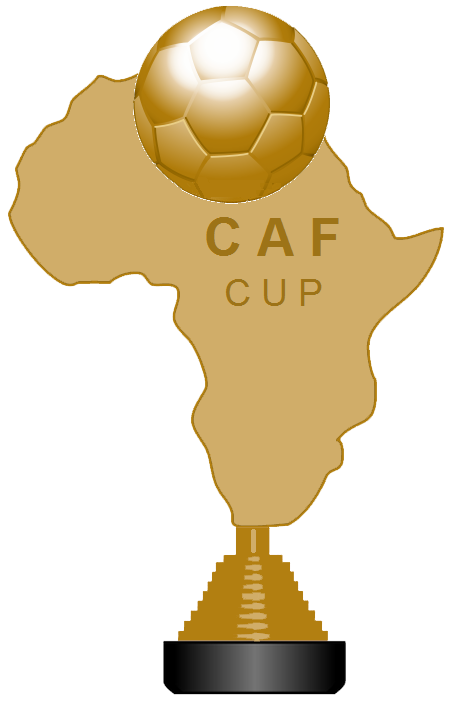
- Organiser(s): CAF
- Founded: 1992
- Abolished: 2004
- Region: Africa
- Teams: 32 (first round)
- Last champions: (Morocco) Raja CA (1st title)
- Most championships: (Algeria) JS Kabylie (3 titles)
- Website: cafonline.com

The CAF Cup was an annual competition organised by the CAF for domestic leagues runners-up of member associations who have not qualified to one of the two pre-existing CAF international club competitions the African Cup of Champions Clubs or the African Cup Winners' Cup.

== History ==
The tournament was founded in 1992 and modeled after the European UEFA Cup. Trophy was named after Moshood Abiola, a Nigerian businessman, publisher and politician and the first Director of Sports in independent Nigeria.

The CAF Cup was the idea of the past CAF president, Issa Hayatou who successfully made 1992 the year of African football. The competition started soon after the successful 1992 African Cup of Nations in which twelve finalists participated in the competition for the first time in the history of the African competition. 31 teams participated in the CAF Cup's first edition, and the Nigerian club Shooting Stars F.C. were the first to hold the cup after defeating the Ugandan Villa SC in the final.

The trophy became an absolute property of JS Kabylie who have won it outright following their third successive win in 2002 being the one and only team in Africa who is able to show the trophy in his trophy room.

The Moroccan club Raja CA was the last to hold the trophy in 2003 defeating the Cameroonian Cotonsport de Garoua in the final.

In 2004, the CAF Cup was merged with the African Cup Winners' Cup, and was renamed the CAF Confederation Cup, again following the European example of the UEFA Europa League. However, the historical record of this competition's honours was not carried over into the new competition, unlike UEFA, which integrated the historical records of the former UEFA Cup into the new competition following its merger with the European Cup Winners' Cup.

== Format ==
Only runners-up of the domestic leagues of member associations were eligible to participate in the competition if and only if they were not participating as cup winners of their national associations cup competitions in the African Cup Winners' Cup.

In case the runner-up of the domestic league was not to participate in the CAF Cup, CAF approval was mandatory to accept another team among the top three placed teams of the concerned association to take part in the competition.

All rounds of the competition including the final were played according to the knock-out system of two legs tie. The team which scores a higher aggregate number of goals in the two matches was qualified for the next round.

== Records and statistics ==
=== Performance by club ===
Team	Winners	Runners-up	Years won	Years runners-up
(Algeria) JS Kabylie	3	0	2000, 2001, 2002	-
(Tunisia) Étoile du Sahel	2	2	1995, 1999	1996, 2001
(Nigeria) Shooting Stars	1	0	1992	-
(Ivory Coast) Stella Club d'Adjamé	1	0	1993	-
(Nigeria) Bendel Insurance	1	0	1994	-
(Morocco) Kawkab Marrakech	1	0	1996	-
(Tunisia) Espérance	1	0	1997	-
(Tunisia) CS Sfaxien	1	0	1998	-
(Morocco) Raja CA	1	0	2003	-
(Uganda) Villa SC	0	1	-	1992
(Tanzania) Simba SC	0	1	-	1993
(Angola) Primeiro de Maio	0	1	-	1994
(Guinea) AS Kaloum Star	0	1	-	1995
(Angola) Petro de Luanda	0	1	-	1997
(Senegal) ASC Jeanne d'Arc	0	1	-	1998
(Morocco) Wydad Casablanca	0	1	-	1999
(Egypt) Ismaily	0	1	-	2000
(Cameroon) Tonnerre Yaoundé	0	1	-	2002
(Cameroon) Cotonsport Garoua	0	1	-	2003

=== Performance by country ===
Nation	Winners	Runners-up	Winning clubs	Runners-up
Tunisia	4	2	Étoile du Sahel (2), Espérance (1), CS Sfaxien (1)	Étoile du Sahel (2)
Algeria	3	0	JS Kabylie (3)	-
Morocco	2	1	Kawkab Marrakech (1), Raja CA (1)	Wydad Casablanca (1)
Nigeria	2	0	Bendel Insurance (1), Shooting Stars (1)	-
Ivory Coast	1	0	Stella Club d'Adjamé (1)	-
Angola	0	2	-	Primeiro de Maio (1), Petro de Luanda (1)
Cameroon	0	2	-	Cotonsport Garoua (1), Tonnerre Yaoundé (1)
Uganda	0	1	-	Villa SC (1)
Tanzania	0	1	-	[Simba S.C.] (1)
Guinea	0	1	-	AS Kaloum Star (1)
Senegal	0	1	-	ASC Jeanne d'Arc (1)
Egypt	0	1	-	Ismaily (1)

== Trivia ==
- JS Kabylie was the only team to reach the final for three successive times between 2000 and 2002 being able to win them all and so became the first and only team to keep the CAF Cup trophy.

== See also ==
- African Cup Winners' Cup
- CAF Confederation Cup
