= Asani Matora =

Zimbabwean footballer (born 1976)

Personal information
- Date of birth: 19 December 1976 (age 49)
- Position: Defender

Senior career*
| Years | Team | Apps | (Gls) |
| 2001–2008 | CAPS United F.C. | | |
| 2008–2010 | DSTV Rangers F.C. | | |

International career
| 2001–2003 | Zimbabwe | 8 | (0) |
- * Club domestic league appearances and goals

Asani Matora (born 19 December 1976) is a retired Zimbabwean football defender.
