= 1994 African Cup Winners' Cup =

Tournament details
- Dates: February - 10 December 1994
- Teams: 35 (from 1 confederation)

Final positions
- Champions: (Zaire) DC Motema Pembe (1st title)
- Runners-up: Kenya Breweries

Tournament statistics
- Matches played: 47
- Goals scored: 127 (2.7 per match)

The 1994 African Cup Winners' Cup football club tournament was won by DC Motema Pembe in two-legged final victory against Kenya Breweries, who were later renamed to Tusker F.C. in 1999. This was the twentieth season that the tournament took place for the winners of each African country's domestic cup. Thirty-five sides entered the competition and despite the relatively small number of competitors, nine teams were either disqualified or decided to withdraw during the preliminary and first rounds of the competition, where AS Cimelta and Black Africa withdrew before 1st leg of the preliminary round, Al Ahly withdraw before the 1st leg of the first round due to political reasons while Renaissance withdrew after the 1st leg of the first round. On the other hand, teams from Benin, Uganda and Zimbabwe were disqualified because their federations were in debt to CAF; Power Dynamos were disqualified because the Zambian federation did not name its entrant in time as well as the Mauritanian side ASC SNIM. Another two teams withdrew before the 1st leg of the second round, Rayon Sports from Rwanda and LPRC Oilers from Liberia.

== Preliminary round ==
Team 1	Agg.	Team 2	1st leg	2nd leg
AS Cimelta (Madagascar)	w/o	(Réunion) Stade Tamponnaise	—	—
Black Africa (Namibia)	w/o	(Lesotho) Bantu FC	—	—
Eleven Men in Flight (Eswatini)	4–3	(Botswana) Township Rollers	3–1	1–2

== First round ==
Team 1	Agg.	Team 2	1st leg	2nd leg
Al Ahly (Egypt)	w/o	(Ethiopia) Saint George SC	—	—
Al-Hilal (Sudan)	2–4	(Rwanda) Rayon Sports	1–0	1–4
BCC Lions (Nigeria)	2–1	(Burkina Faso) AS Fonctionnaires	2–1	0–0
Kenya Breweries	5–1	(Mozambique) Ferroviário da Beira	2–0	3–1
Canon Yaoundé (Cameroon)	2–1	(Angola) ASA	2–0	0–1
DC Motema Pembe (Zaire)	2–2 (5–4 p)	(Central African Republic) Anges de Fatima	2–0	0–2
Djoliba AC (Mali)	0–2	(Algeria) NA Hussein-Dey	0–0	0–2
Hafia FC (Guinea)	1–6	(Togo) OC Agaza	1–3	0–3
LPRC Oilers (Liberia)	dq	(Mauritania) ASC Snim	—	—
Malindi SC (Tanzania)	dq^{1}	(Uganda) KCC	—	—
Mbilinga FC (Gabon)	w/o	(Chad) Renaissance FC	13–0	—
Olympique Béja (Tunisia)	3–1	(Niger) Sahel SC	3–0	0–1
Postel Sport (Benin)	dq^{1}	(Sierra Leone) Mighty Blackpool	—	—
Power Dynamos (Zambia)	dq^{2}	(Eswatini) Eleven Men in Flight	—	—
Tanganda F.C. (Zimbabwe)	dq^{1}	(Réunion) Stade Tamponnaise	—	—
Witbank Black Aces (South Africa)	8–2	(Lesotho) Bantu FC	6–1	2–1

Notes
^{1} KCC from Uganda, Postel Sport from Benin and Tanganda FC from Zimbabwe were disqualified because their federations were in debt to CAF.
^{2} Power Dynamos were disqualified because the Zambian federation did not name its entrant in time.

== Second round ==
Team 1	Agg.	Team 2	1st leg	2nd leg
OC Agaza (Togo)	3–2	(Cameroon) Canon Yaoundé	3–1	0–1
BCC Lions (Nigeria)	4–0	(Algeria) NA Hussein-Dey	2–0	2–0
Kenya Breweries	w/o	(Rwanda) Rayon Sports	—	—
DC Motema Pembe (Zaire)	3–2	(Sierra Leone) Mighty Blackpool	3–0	0–2
Malindi SC (Tanzania)	2–0	(Eswatini) Eleven Men in Flight	1–0	1–0
Mbilinga FC (Gabon)	w/o	(Liberia) LPRC Oilers	—	—
Saint George SC (Ethiopia)	2–3	(Tunisia) Olympique Béja	2–0	0–3
Witbank Black Aces (South Africa)	3–4	(Réunion) Stade Tamponnaise	1–0	2–4

== Quarter-finals ==
Team 1	Agg.	Team 2	1st leg	2nd leg
OC Agaza (Togo)	7–5	(Tunisia) Olympique Béja	6–1	1–4
BCC Lions (Nigeria)	4–5	(Zaire) DC Motema Pembe	2–1	2–4
Kenya Breweries	2–1	(Réunion) Stade Tamponnaise	1–0	1–1
Mbilinga FC (Gabon)	4–1	(Tanzania) Malindi SC	4–0	0–1

== Semi-finals ==
Team 1	Agg.	Team 2	1st leg	2nd leg
DC Motema Pembe (Zaire)	4–2	(Togo) OC Agaza	3–1	1–1
Mbilinga FC (Gabon)	1–4	Kenya Breweries	1–1	0–3

== Final ==
Team 1	Agg.	Team 2	1st leg	2nd leg
DC Motema Pembe (Zaire)	5–2	Kenya Breweries	2–2	3–0

=== First leg ===
27 November 1994

DC Motema Pembe (Zaire)	2 – 2	Kenya Breweries
Monka 16'; Buawi 45'		Nachok 5'; Motego 55'

Stade des Martyrs, Kinshasa

=== Second leg ===
10 December 1994

Kenya Breweries	0 – 3	(Zaire) DC Motema Pembe

Moi International Sports Centre, Nairobi
