= Jimmy Kirunda =

Ugandan footballer and manager (1950–2020)

Personal information
- Full name: James C. Kirunda
- Date of birth: 1950
- Place of birth: Uganda
- Date of death: 25 May 2020 (aged 70)
- Place of death: Wandegeya, Kampala, Uganda
- Position: Defender

Youth career
- Mulago FC

Senior career*
Years	Team	Apps	(Gls)
1968–1969	Express FC		
1969–1979	KCC		
1979–1980	Abu Dhabi Sports Club		
- KCC
- SC Villa

International career
- Uganda

Managerial career
- SC Villa
- Bell FC
- KCC
- 1985–: Buikwe Red Stars
- Cooperative FC
- 1989–1996: Uganda
- * Club domestic league appearances and goals

James C. Kirunda (1950 – 25 May 2020) was a Ugandan international football player and international football manager for the Uganda national team.

He participated in five Africa Cup of Nations qualifying campaigns and captained Uganda in three of the finals tournaments.

He was manager of the national team between 1989 and 1996.
