= Sammy Ssebaduka =

Ugandan footballer (born 2002)

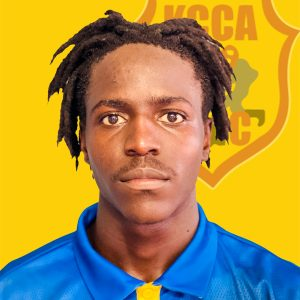
- Sammy Ssebaduka

Personal information
- Full name: Sammy Raynald Ssebaduka
- Date of birth: 30 December 2002 (age 23)
- Place of birth: Toronto, Canada
- Height: 1.79 m (5 ft 10 in)
- Position: Winger

Team information
- Current team: KCCA
- Number: 6

Senior career*
Years	Team	Apps	(Gls)
- York University SC
2020–2021	Police FC	20	(0)
2022–2023	North York Academy FC	0	(0)
2024-	KCCA	2	

International career^{‡}
2020	Uganda U20	00	
- * Club domestic league appearances and goals as of 28 December 2022 ‡ National team caps and goals as of 13:45, 1 December 2024 (UTC)

Sammy Raynald Ssebaduka (born 30 December 2002) is a Canadian born - Ugandan based footballer who plays for Kampala Capital City Authority FC in the Uganda Premier League as winger.

== Early life ==
Ssebaduka was born to Godfrey Sembeguya and Solome Nanvule. Married. He started his football journey while at a tender age rising through various football academies like SC Toronto (2009-2013), Benfica Academy in Portugal (2014), Power Soccer Academy (2014-2017), Toronto Sporting Football Club Academy (2019), Gil Vicente Academy Toronto (2019-2020), North York Academy 2021, Police FC (2021-2022), York University men's Soccer team (2002), Vaughn League 1 men's soccer team (2023), Masters Futbol League 2 team (2024) and currently plays for Kampala Capital City Authority FC.

== Police FC ==
In January 2022, Ssebaduka joined Police FC and make his debut on 8 April 2022 at Phillip Omondi Stadium when Onduparaka FC defeated them 4-1. He played his last game on 21 May 2022 at St. Mary's Stadium against Vipers SC, losing 5-0.

== KCCA FC ==
In September 2024, Ssebaduka signed for Kampala Capital City Authority FC on a three-year deal. He made his debut on 20 September 2024 at Lugazi FC Stadium in the 76th minute replacing Shafik Kwikiriza Nana and the match ended in a 1-1 draw.

== National team ==
Ssebaduka has been named several times on Uganda U20 (Hippos) team.
