= Umar Lutalo =

Ugandan footballer

Personal information
- Full name: Umar Lutalo
- Date of birth: December 15, 2003 (age 22)
- Place of birth: Uganda
- Positions: Attacking midfielder; left back; left winger

Team information
- Current team: BUL Football club

Youth career
- Aspire Academy (Qatar)

Senior career*
Years	Team	Apps	(Gls)
2021–2024	SC Villa	54	(10)
2024–2025	Kitara FC	4	(0)
2025–	KCCA FC	7	(1)

International career^{‡}
2023	Uganda U20	3	(0)
2023	Uganda	1	(0)
- * Club domestic league appearances and goals as of 23 August 2025 ‡ National team caps and goals as of 23 August 2025

Umar Lutalo (born 15 December 2003) is a Ugandan professional footballer who plays as a midfielder for KCCA FC in the Uganda Premier League and the Uganda national football team. He won the Uganda Premier League title with SC Villa in the 2023/2024 season. He featured in the U-20 Africa Cup of Nations which was hosted in Egypt in 2023 and was also among the Uganda cranes team squad for the 2026 world cup qualifiers against Botswana, Somalia and Guinea

== Club career ==
=== SC Villa ===
Lutalo joined SC Villa where he played for three years after his return from Aspire Academy in Qatar. He was instrumental in SC villa's journey to attain the 17th Uganda premium league title. He made 54 appearances and scored 10 goals for the team in the 2023/2024 season.

==== Kitara Football club ====
In 2024, Lutalo joined Kitara on a one-year contract as midfielder where he played in the first round of the 2024/2025 football season.

===== Kampala Capital City Football Association Foot ball club =====
Lutalo transferred to Kampala Capital City Authority Football Club at the end of the 2024–2025 season. He contributed in the midfield and left back position. In July 2025,he extended his contract with Kampala Capital City Authority Football Club for two years in preparation for the 2025/2026 season.

BUL FC strengthen squad with versatile midfielder Umar Lutalo

== International career ==
Lutalo featured in the U-20 Africa Cup of Nations which took place in Egypt in 2023 and was among the Uganda cranes team squad 2026 world cup qualifiers against Botswana, Somalia and Guinea

== Statistical career ==
Appearances and goals per national team and year
National team	year	appearances	goals
SC Villa	2021/2022	15	1
SC Villa	2022/2023	16	1
SC Villa	2023/2024	23	8
Kitara	2024/2025	4	0
KCCA	2024/2025	7	1
Total		65	11

== Achievements ==
Uganda Premier League Champion (2023/24 Season): Lutalo was part of SC Villa's squad that won the Uganda Premier League Champion.

== See also ==
- Denis Omedi
