= 1997 Uganda Super League =

Football season in Uganda

Uganda Super League
- Season: 1997
- Champions: Kampala City Council FC
- Top goalscorer: Jackson Mayanja, KCC FC; Charles Ogwang, Umeme FC (18)

The 1997 Ugandan Super League was the 30th season of the official Ugandan football championship, the top-level football league of Uganda.

== Overview ==
The 1997 Uganda Super League was contested by 16 teams and was won by Kampala City Council FC, while Maji, Old Timers of Mbarara FC, Natete and Telestars were relegated.

== League standings ==
Pos	Team	Pld	W	D	L	GF	GA	GD	Pts	Qualification or relegation
1	Kampala City Council FC (C)	30	24	4	2	59	19	+40	76	Serie A
2	Uganda Electricity Board	30	23	4	3	54	18	+36	73	Serie A
3	Express FC	30	22	6	2	68	18	+50	72	Serie A
4	SC Villa	30	21	8	1	54	18	+36	71	Serie A
5	Nile Omuliro	30	13	7	10	37	30	+7	46	Serie A
6	Simba SC	30	12	7	11	33	27	+6	43	Serie A
7	Police FC	30	12	5	13	35	33	+2	41	Serie A
8	SCOUL	30	9	11	10	31	39	−8	38	Serie B
9	Mbale Dairy Heroes	30	10	7	13	31	30	+1	37	Serie A
10	Iganga Town Council FC	30	10	7	13	34	41	−7	37	Serie B
11	Posta	30	10	6	14	32	37	−5	36	Serie B
12	State House FC	30	8	10	12	32	36	−4	34	Serie B
13	Maji (R)	30	8	6	16	27	31	−4	30	Relegated
14	Old Timers of Mbarara FC (R)	30	5	5	20	24	55	−31	20	Relegated
15	Natete (R)	30	4	1	25	10	68	−58	13	Relegated
16	Telestars (R)	30	2	3	25	13	64	−51	9	Relegated

(C) Champions; (R) Relegated

== Leading goalscorer ==
The top goalscorers in the 1997 season were Jackson Mayanja (Kampala City Council FC) and Charles Ogwang (Umeme FC) with 18 goals each.
