= Emmanuel Anyama =

Ugandan footballer (born 1998)

Personal information
- Date of birth: 14 July 1998 (age 28)
- Position: Forward

Team information
- Current team: KCCA FC
- Number: 17
2024	Uganda national football team		

Emmanuel Anyama(born 14 July 1998), also known as Pastor Emma, is a Ugandan footballer who plays as a forward for Kampala City Council Authority Football Club (KCCA FC) and the Uganda national team.

Anyama began his career with Adjumani Town Council FC, competing in the West Nile Regional League and after he moved to Kaaro Karungi FC in the FUFA Big League. In June 2024, Anyama joined Kampala Capital City Authority FC (KCCA FC) in the Uganda Premier League.

Anyama was named in Uganda’s final 25-man squad for the African Nations Championship 2024 (CHAN 2024), marking his first senior national-team call-up.
