= Kampala Capital City Authority FC =

Association football club in Uganda

Kampala Capital City Authority
- Full name: Kampala Capital City Authority; Football Club
- Nicknames: Kasasiro Boys (Garbage collectors), The Impalas, The Cityzens
- Short name: KCCA FC
- Founded: 1963; 63 years ago
- Stadium: MNT Omondi
- Capacity: 10,000
- Chairman: Eng. Andrew Mukiibi Sserunjogi
- Manager: Jackson Magera Kaddu
- League: Uganda Premier League
- 2025–26: 2nd of 16
- Website: www.kccafc.co.ug
Home colours	Away colours

Kampala Capital City Authority Football Club (abbreviated as KCCA FC), also known as Kampala City, is a Ugandan professional football club based in Kampala. Kampala City Council was rebranded to Kampala Capital City Authority and the club title has been changed accordingly. Many sources and news reports still refer to the club's traditional title, Kampala City Council Football Club, abbreviated as KCC.

== History ==
The club was founded on 12 April 1963 by Samuel Wamala, who was head of the council's Sewage Works section in the City Engineering Department. The club initially was dominated by casual workers in the sewage section but subsequently expanded to cover all departments within Kampala City Council.

In 1965 KCC joined the Kampala and District Football League (KDFL) Third Division (which was split into two sections) and under the guidance of Bidandi Ssali (Head Coach) and Samuel Wamala (chairman) the club soon progressed. After finishing in sixth place in their first season, in 1966 they gained promotion from the Third Division South after finishing in second place.

By 1968 KCC were playing teams like Express FC, Army FC, KDS (Kampala District Bus Services), Railways, UEB and Nsambya in Division One of the KDFL but in 1971 they were relegated back to the Second Division. By this time the KDFL was being run concurrently with the National Football League and subsequently was scrapped to allow room to a wider national competition with several divisions. KCC became a member of the newly formed second division of the National League along with Nsambya and NIC.<that was the lead>

By 1974 KCC had gained promotion to the National League and finished in second position in both their first and second seasons in the top tier just one point behind champions Express FC on each occasion. The following season in 1976 KCC won their first championship title finishing one point ahead of Express. They also won the title in 1977 in a more emphatic manner although during this season Express were banned for allegedly being involving in anti-government activities.

Simba FC (the Army side) finished as champions in 1978 with KCC taking second place but the Council side won the CECAFA Clubs Cup, the regional club championships in Kampala, becoming the first Ugandan side to take the regional title. The trophy was presented to the KCC skipper, Sam Musenze, by President Idi Amin. Players representing KCC included Phillip Omondi, Jimmy Kirunda, Jamil Kasirye, Hussein Matovu, Tom Lwanga, Sam Musenze, Yusuf Toyota, Peter Mazinga, Apolo Lumu, Billy Kizito, Hussein Matovu, Chris Dungu, Gerald Kabaireho, Ashe Muksa, Rashid Mudin, Moses Sentamu, Timothy Ayeieko, Angelo Dotte and Hassan Biruma, Peter Wandyette. The 1978 team broke up with some senior players turning semi-professional and moving to the United Arab Emirates. However, following the recruitment of youthful players such as Godfrey Kateregga, Sam Mugambe and top-scorer Davis Kamoga the club made an impact on the Ugandan Cup winning the competition in 1979 having been awarded a walkover for their match against Uganda Commercial Bank FC in the final.

The club enjoyed their halcyon days in the 1980s by winning the Uganda Cup in 1980, 1982, 1984 and 1987 and the league championship in the intervening years in 1981, 1983 and 1985. The goal scoring exploits of Davis Kamoga, with 21 goals in 1980, and Frank Kyazze, with 18 goals in 1984 and 28 goals in 1985, made a major contribution to the club's success.

A less successful period followed although KCC did take the Super League title in 1991 and 1997 and the Uganda Cup in 1990 and 1993. After the 1997 championship success there followed a period of administrative problems and upheaval including the appointment and sacking of a succession of coaches .

In 2007–08 KCC won the league championship for the first time in over a decade with a rising star in striker Brian Umony who netted 15 goals and subsequently moved on to professional ranks with Supersport United of South Africa. In 2012–13 the club repeated the feat by finishing 7 points ahead of Uganda Revenue Authority SC. The other success in the last decade was a Uganda Cup title in 2004 2017 and 2018

On the international club football front KCC reached the quarter-finals of the African Cup of Champions Clubs in 1978 and 1982 and made second round appearances in 1977, 1984, 1986 and 1992. In addition they have made three appearances in the CAF Champions League in 1998, 2009 and 2018; four appearances in the CAF Cup in 1995, 1997, 2001 and 2002; three appearances in the CAF Confederation Cup in 2005, 2009 and 2017; and finally seven appearances in the CAF Cup Winners' Cup in 1980, 1981, 1983, 1985, 1988, 1991 and 1994.

In total KCC (now known as KCCA FC) have won 13 Uganda league championship titles, the last one being in 2019 and 10 Ugandan Cup titles, along with 2 CECAFA Clubs Cup in 1978 and 2019 wins at the regional level.

== Crest ==
Old logo

Current logo

== Records and statistics ==
=== Record in the top tier ===
Season	Tier	League	Pos.	Pl.	W	D	L	GS	GA	Pts	
1974	1	Uganda National League	2nd	14	10	1	3	29	16	21	
1975	1	Uganda National League	2nd	18	11	4	3	37	11	26	
1976	1	Uganda National League	1st	22	15	5	2	55	16	35	Champions
1977	1	Uganda National League	1st	26	21	3	2	74	17	45	Champions
1978	1	Uganda National League	2nd	28	19	4	5	76	23	42	
1979	1	Uganda National League	2nd	26	15	6	5	56	28	36	
1980	1	Uganda National League	3rd	30	16	8	6	51	26	40	
1981	1	Uganda National League	1st	32	21	6	5	87	28	48	Champions
1982	1	Uganda Super League	2nd	17	11	3	3	30	19	25	
1983	1	Uganda Super League	1st	28	22	4	2	75	22	48	Champions
1984	1	Uganda Super League	2nd	30	21	7	2	67	19	49	
1985	1	Uganda Super League	1st	26	18	5	3	54	24	41	Champions
1986	1	Uganda Super League	4th	28	15	7	6	44	29	37	
1987	1	Uganda Super League	3rd	21	13	2	6	43	20	28	
1988	1	Uganda Super League									Not available
1989	1	Uganda Super League	3rd	22	12	6	4	32	12	30	
1990	1	Uganda Super League	3rd	22	14	4	4	32	18	32	
1991	1	Uganda Super League	1st	19	16	3	0	44	11	35	Champions
1992	1	Uganda Super League	4th	26	11	9	6	37	28	31	
1993	1	Uganda Super League	3rd	27	17	7	3	45	8	41	
1994	1	Uganda Super League	3rd	28	14	9	5	45	22	51	
1995	1	Uganda Super League	6th	28	7	15	6	21	23	36	
1996	1	Uganda Super League	2nd	30	20	5	5	56	19	65	
1997	1	Uganda Super League	1st	30	24	4	2	59	19	76	Champions
1998	1	Uganda Super League; Nile SL Serie A	4th	21	8		6	29	21	31	
1999	1	Uganda Super League	4th	38	21	11	6	68	30	74	

Season	Tier	League	Pos.	Pl.	W	D	L	GS	GA	Pts	
2000	1	Uganda Super League	2nd	30	23	1	6	76	23	70	
2001	1	Uganda Super League	2nd	28	18	9	1	68	20	63	
2002	1	Uganda Super League	3rd	28	20	4	4	47	20	64	
2002–03	1	Uganda Super League	3rd	27	16	5	6	52	25	53	
2004	1	Uganda Super League	2nd	29	17	7	5	50	25	58	
2005	1	Uganda Super League; Group B	3rd	8	4	2	2	18	9	14	Qualified for KO phase: reached semi-finals
2006	1	Uganda Super League	4th	28	15	8	5	34	17	53	
2006–07	1	Uganda Super League	4th	32	17	6	9	51	33	57	
2007–08	1	Uganda Super League	1st	34	22	8	4	61	23	74	Champions
2008–09	1	Uganda Super League	2nd	34	24	6	4	60	21	78	
2009–10	1	Uganda Super League	4th	34	14	15	5	41	14	57	
2010–11	1	Uganda Super League	2nd	26	14	6	6	26	14	48	
2011–12	1	Uganda Super League	7th	28	12	8	8	32	22	44	
2012–13	1	Uganda Super League	1st	30	17	12	1	50	16	63	Champions
2013–14	1	Uganda Premier League	1st	30	18	6	6	60	24	60	Champions
2014–15	1	Uganda Premier League	3rd	30	16	7	7	42	18	55	
2015–16	1	Uganda Premier League	1st	30	16	9	5	39	21	57	Champions
2016–17	1	Uganda Premier League	1st	30	20	6	4	59	25	66	Champions
2017–18	1	Uganda Premier League	2nd	30	17	10	3	54	21	61	
2018–19	1	Uganda Premier League	1st	30	19	9	2	61	23	66	Champions
2019–20	1	Uganda Premier League	2nd	25	15	5	5	42	21	50	League ended prematurely due to Covid 19
2020–21	1	Uganda Premier League	4th	27	14	6	7	56	22	48	League ended prematurely due to Covid 19
2019–22	1	Uganda Premier League	2nd	30	15	11	4	41	21	56	
2022–23	1	Uganda Premier League	2nd	28	15	8	5	44	23	53	
2023–24	1	Uganda Premier League	5th	29	15	4	10	54	33	49	

=== African cups history ===
Season	Competition	Round	Club	1st Leg	2nd Leg	Aggregate
1977	African Cup of Champions Clubs	First round	(Ethiopia) Mechal Army	1–0	3–0	4–0
1977	African Cup of Champions Clubs	Second round	(Algeria) MC Algiers	1–1	2–3	3–4
1978	African Cup of Champions Clubs	First round	(Somalia) Horsed FC	1–1	2–0	3–0
1978	African Cup of Champions Clubs	Second round	(Egypt) Al Ahly			w/o
1978	African Cup of Champions Clubs	Quarter-finals	(Nigeria) Enugu Rangers	1–3	0–1	1–4
1980	African Cup Winners' Cup	First round	(Somalia) Marine Club FC	3–1	2–1	5–2
1980	African Cup Winners' Cup	Second round	(Zaire) Tout Puissant Mazembe	0–1	2–2	2–3
1981	African Cup Winners' Cup	First round	(Algeria) EP Sétif	1–0	0–2	1–2
1982	African Cup of Champions Clubs	First round	(Kenya) AFC Leopards	3–0	1–4	4–4 (ag.)
1982	African Cup of Champions Clubs	Second round	(Sudan) Al-Hilal	2–0	3–1	5–1
1982	African Cup of Champions Clubs	Quarter-finals	(Ghana) Asante Kotoko	0–6	1–1	1–7
1983	African Cup Winners' Cup	First round	(Somalia) Horsed FC	2–0	0–1	2–1
1983	African Cup Winners' Cup	Second round	(Egypt) Al Moqaweloon Al Arab	2–2	2–2	4–4 (1–3p.)
1984	African Cup of Champions Clubs	First round	(Mozambique) Desportivo Maputo	6–1	3–2	9–3
1984	African Cup of Champions Clubs	Second round	(Zimbabwe) Dynamos FC	0–0	1–2	1–2
1985	African Cup Winners' Cup	First round	(Burundi) FC Inter Star	2–1	3–0	5–1
1985	African Cup Winners' Cup	Second round	(Zimbabwe) Gweru United FC	3–1	1–1	4–2
1985	African Cup Winners' Cup	Quarter-finals	(Libya) Al-Nasr SC (Benghazi)	1–0	0–1	1–1 (2–4p.)
1986	African Cup of Champions Clubs	First round	(Libya) Al Dhahra Tripoli	1–2	2–0	3–2
1986	African Cup of Champions Clubs	Second round	(Burundi) FC Inter Star	1–1	1–2	2–3
1988	African Cup Winners' Cup	First round	(Zaire) AS Kalamu	0–1	0–1	0–2
1991	African Cup Winners' Cup	First round	(Madagascar) FC BFV	0–1	3–1	3–2
1991	African Cup Winners' Cup	Second round	(Egypt) Al Moqaweloon Al Arab	0–2	1–0	1–2
1992	African Cup of Champions Clubs	First round	(Lesotho) Arsenal	1–2	1–0	2–2 (ag.)
1992	African Cup of Champions Clubs	Second round	(Zambia) Nkana Red Devils	0–4	0–2	0–6
1994	African Cup Winners' Cup	First round	(Tanzania) Malindi SC			disqualified
1995	CAF Cup	First round	Al-Hilal SC (Port Sudan)	2–0	1–1	3–1
1995	CAF Cup	Second round	(Tanzania) Malindi SC	0–1	0–2	0–3
1997	CAF Cup	First round	Rwanda FC	3–0	1–2	4–2
1997	CAF Cup	Second round	(Zaire) AS Bantous	1–0	not played	1–0
1997	CAF Cup	Quarter-finals	(Kenya) AFC Leopards	2–2	1–0	3–2
1997	CAF Cup	Semi-finals	(Tunisia) Espérance de Tunis	1–3	0–6	1–9
1998	CAF Champions League	First round	(Zambia) Power Dynamos	0–1	1–2	1–3
2001	CAF Cup	First round	(South Africa) Ajax Cape Town	0–2	1–1	1–3
2002	CAF Cup	First round	(Ethiopia) Saint George FC	0–1	0–0	0–1
2005	CAF Confederation Cup	First round	(Rwanda) APR FC	0–0	0–1	0–1
2009	CAF Champions League	Preliminary round	(Mozambique) Ferroviário Maputo	1–2	2–0	3–2
2009	CAF Champions League	First round	(South Africa) Supersport United	2–1	1–1	3–2
2009	CAF Champions League	Second round	(Sudan) Al-Merrikh	0–1	1–1	1–2
2009	CAF Confederation Cup	Second Round of 16	(Nigeria) Bayelsa United	3–1	0–4	3–5
2014	CAF Champions League	Preliminary round	(Sudan) Al-Merrikh	2–0	1–2	3–2
2014	CAF Champions League	First round	(Zambia) Nkana	2–2	1–2	3–4
2015	CAF Champions League	Preliminary round	(Cameroon) Cosmos de Bafia	1–0	0–3	1–3
2017	CAF Champions League	Preliminary round	(Angola) 1º de Agosto	1–0	1–2	2–2
2017	CAF Champions League	First round	(South Africa) Mamelodi Sundowns	1–1	1–2	2–3
2018	CAF Champions League	Preliminary round	(Madagascar) CNaPS Sport	1–0	1–2	2–2
2018	CAF Champions League	First round	(Ethiopia) Saint George	1–0	0–0	1–0
2018	CAF Champions League	Group stage(A)	(Egypt) Al Ahly	2–0	3–4	
2018	CAF Champions League	Group stage(A)	(Tunisia) Espérance de Tunis	0–1	2–3	
2018	CAF Champions League	Group stage(A)	(Botswana) Township Rollers	1–0	0–1	

== Players ==
=== Current squad ===
As of 6 April, 2026 https://www.kccafc.co.ug/first-team/

Note: Flags indicate national team as defined under FIFA eligibility rules; some limited exceptions apply. Players may hold more than one non-FIFA nationality.

No.	Pos.	Nation	Player
1	GK	UGA	Mutwalibi Mugolofa
2	DF	UGA	Herbert Achai
3	DF	UGA	Muhamud Hassan
4	MF	UGA	Saidi Mayanja
5	MF	UGA	Sharifu Ssengendo
6	MF	UGA	Sammy Ssebaduka
7	FW	BRA	Joao Gabriel
8	FW	UGA	Alpha Ssali
9	FW	UGA	Derrick Nsibambi
10	FW	ANG	Etienne Katenga
11	FW	UGA	Ivan Ahimbisibwe
12	GK	UGA	Charles Lukwago
13	MF	UGA	Peter Magambo
14	MF	UGA	Rogers Mugisha
15	DF	UGA	Enock Walusimbi
16	DF	UGA	Fillbert Obenchan
17	MF	UGA	Ashraf Mugume

No.	Pos.	Nation	Player
18	DF	UGA	Umar Lutalo
19	FW	UGA	Shafik Nana Kwikiriza
20	FW	UGA	Emmanuel Anyama
21	DF	UGA	Gavin Kizito
22	MF	UGA	Joel Sserunjogi
23	MF	GAB	Axel Mezui
24	GK	UGA	Anthony Okimaru
25	MF	UGA	Bright Anukani
26	DF	UGA	James Mubezi
27	FW	UGA	Lazaro Bwambale
28	GK	UGA	Humphrey Oyirwoth
29	DF	UGA	Haruna Lukwago
30	MF	UGA	Alex Yiga
39	FW	UGA	Kennedy Muserero
45	DF	UGA	Steven Oyirwoth
54	FW	UGA	Yian Gatbel
63	MF	UGA	Thomas Ogema

=== Former players ===
For a complete list of existing and former Kampala City Council FC players with Wikipedia articles, see

.

== Stadium ==
The home of KCCA FC in Lugogo, Kampala, is known as the MTN Omondi Stadium since 2020 for sponsorship reasons. The stadium was formerly named Startimes Stadium (2017–2020) and Phillip Omondi Stadium after a club Legend- Phillip Omondi (RIP). The plan to expand the stadium to a state of the art stadium is underway. The stadium capacity is 10000

== Achievements ==
- Ugandan Super League: 13

1976, 1977, 1981, 1983, 1985, 1991, 1997, 2007–08, 2012–13, 2013–14, 2015–16, 2016–17, 2018–19

- Ugandan Cup: 10

1979, 1980, 1982, 1984, 1987, 1990, 1993, 2004, 2017, 2018

- CECAFA Clubs Cup: 2

1978, 2019

- FUFA Super Cup: 6

2013, 2014, 2016, 2017, 2018, 2019

- Super 8: 1

2018

- Nkurunziza Peace Cup: 1

2022

== Performance in CAF competitions ==
- CAF Champions League: 5 appearances

1998 – First round

2009 – Second round

2014 – First round

2017 – Preliminary round

2018 – Group stages

- African Cup of Champions Clubs: 6 appearances

1977: Second round
1978: Quarter-finals

1982: Quarter-finals
1984: Second round

1986: Second round
1992: Second round

- CAF Cup: 4 appearances

1995 – Second round
1997 – Semi-finals

2001 – First round

2002 – First round

- CAF Confederation Cup: 4 appearances

2005 – First round

2009 – Second round of 16

2017 – Group stages

2019 – Preliminary round

- CAF Cup Winners' Cup: 7 appearances

1980 – Second round
1981 – First round
1983 – Second round

1985 – Quarter-finals
1988 – First round
1991 – Second round

1994 – First round
