= Mkhuphali Masuku =

Zimbabwean footballer and manager (born 1980)

Personal information
- Date of birth: 28 March 1980 (age 46)
- Place of birth: Gwanda, Zimbabwe
- Position: Midfielder

Senior career*
Years	Team	Apps	(Gls)
2001–2004	Amazulu FC		
2004–2010	Highlanders		

International career
2000	Zimbabwe	1	(0)

Managerial career
- 2011: Highlanders
- 2012: CAPS United
- * Club domestic league appearances and goals

Mkhuphali "Mike" Masuku (born 28 March 1980) is a Zimbabwean football manager and former player. He played club football for Highlanders FC and represented the Zimbabwe national football team.

== Career ==
Born in Gwanda, Masuku began playing football with the youth sides of Gwanda and Amazulu FC (Bulawayo). He played for Amazulu FC's senior side, where he would win the Zimbabwe Premier Soccer League, Independence Trophy and the Madison Trophy. Masuku was capped by Zimbabwe at youth and senior levels while with AmaZulu. He moved to Highlanders where he again won the league in 2006.

After he retired from playing, Masuku became a football coach. He has managed Bulawayo side Highlanders. In September Mohammed Fathi resigned and Highlanders assistant coach Mkhuphali Masuku was elevated to caretaker coach and managed to guide the Bulawayo outfit to a respectable third position after winning 10 and drawing two matches.

After winning the 2011 Independence Trophy with Highlanders, he was appointed manager of CAPS United in 2012.
