= Kilembe Mines FC =

Association football club in Uganda

- Full name: Kilembe Mines Football Club
- Ground: , Kilembe, Kasese, Uganda
- Chairman: Alex Kwatampola
- League: Kasese District League; Division One (Fourth tier)

Kilembe Mines Football Club, abbreviated as Kilembe Mines FC, is a Ugandan football club located in Kilembe, Kasese in the Rwenzori Mountains. The club played in the Uganda National League throughout the 1970s.

== History ==
Kilembe Mines FC currently plays in the Kasese District League Division One which is part of the fourth tier of the Ugandan football league system. The club is affiliated to the Kasese District Football Association which is within Zone 11 Kitara region (Tooro Sub Region) of the FUFA administrative areas.

Kilembe Mines FC was supported financially by the Kilembe Mines Limited and became the first up-country club to play in Uganda's top league, the National First Division League in 1969. In their first match in the top tier the club lost 14–0 away to Express FC at the Nakivubo Stadium. However, in the reverse fixture at Kilembe in the final match of the season the home side gained revenge by defeating Express 1–0 to hand the title to Prisons FC. The club competed nine seasons at the highest level until 1979 when they were relegated. Former Cranes internationals Mike “Computer” Kiganda, Hussein Matovu and Emmy Kalanzi were some of the club's stars.

The decline of the football club was closely linked to the fortunes of the copper mined by the Kilembe Mines Company. Up until the early 1980s the copper sourced from the mines was one of Uganda's leading foreign exchange earners. However, the mines fell victim to President Idi Amin’s “economic war” aimed at empowering indigenous Ugandans. The Canadian company that managed the mines was expelled as a consequence and at the same time copper prices on the world market plummeted. Copper mining eventually ceased in 1982 which meant that the company's football, boxing and athletics sections lost their generous support and sportsmen lost their jobs.

Despite inactive mines and dilapidated buildings in Kilembe, the football club still functions and in the 2006–07 season Kilembe Mines FC reached the semi-finals of the Western Zone Mini League (in Bushenyi) before going out 4–0 to Biharwe FC. If the club had won the Western Zone Mini League they would have been promoted to the Uganda Super League instead of Biharwe FC.

In 2013 it was reported that Kilembe Mines Ltd is set to resume production some 30 years after the mines were shut down. This arose after the government of Uganda handed down a concession to manage the former copper giant to a consortium of Chinese companies. This development may eventually result in the resurrection of Kilembe Mines FC as a soccer force in Uganda.

=== Record in the top tier ===
Season	Tier	League	Pos.	Pl.	W	D	L	GS	GA	Pts	Movements
1969	1	Uganda National First Division League	7th	18	5	2	11	34	61	12	
1970	1	Uganda National First Division League	6th	10	5	1	4	14	3	11	
1971	1	Uganda National First Division League	8th	14	2	2	10	23	34	6	
1972		Competition abandoned									
1973		Competition abandoned									
1974	1	Uganda National League	8th	14	0	4	10	9	30	4	
1975	1	Uganda National League	10th	18	0	3	15	9	50	3	
1976	1	Uganda National League	10th	19	4	4	11	16	34	12	Three matches were not completed.
1977	1	Uganda National League	7th	26	9	6	11	28	33	24	
1978	1	Uganda National League	10th	28	7	7	14	35	51	21	
1979	1	Uganda National League	12th	26	6	3	17	23	47	15	Relegated

== Non-playing staff ==
Name	Role
Alex Kwatampola	Chairman
Innocent Masumbuko	Secretary
Hassan Harry Basiisa	Finance
