= Shafik Nana Kwikiriza =

Ugandan professional football player

Personal information
- Full name: Shafik Nana Kwikiriza
- Date of birth: March 3, 2004 (age 22)
- Position: Forward

Team information
- Current team: KCCA FC
- Number: 19

Senior career*
| Years | Team | Apps | (Gls) |
| 2022–2024 | BUL FC | | |
| 2024– | KCCA FC | | |

International career^{‡}
| 2024– | Uganda | | |
- * Club domestic league appearances and goals as of 24 August 2025 ‡ National team caps and goals as of 24 August 2025

Shafik Nana Kwikiriza (born 3 March 2004) is a Ugandan professional footballer who plays as a forward for KCCA FC in the Uganda Premier League and the Uganda national team.

== Club career ==
Kwikiriza began his senior career at BUL FC, he played for the club between the 2022–23 and 2023–24 Uganda Premier League seasons.

On 9 June 2024, Kwikiriza signed a five-year contract with KCCA FC, keeping him at the club until the 2028–29 season. He was assigned shirt number 19 for the 2024–25 campaign.

Kwikiriza scored his first goals for KCCA in a 5–0 league victory over Mbale Heroes in October 2024, where he doubled the lead and later provided an assist.

== International career ==
In October 2024, Kwikiriza received his first call-up to the Uganda national football team ahead of the 2025 Africa Cup of Nations qualifiers against South Sudan.

== See also ==
- Reagan Mpande
- Allan Okello
- Rogers Ochaki Torach
