= James Mubezi =

Ugandan footballer

Personal information
- Date of birth: 6 November 2004 (age 21)
- Height: 1.85 m (6 ft 1 in)
- Position: Defender

Team information
- Current team: KCCA FC

James Mubezi (born 6 November 2004) is a Ugandan professional footballer who plays for KCCA FC as a defender wearing T-shirt number 25.

== Club career ==
Mubezi started his career at Kirinya Jinja SS Junior team and he was signed by Mbale Heroes FC where he played till 2022 and he joined the KCCA FC U20 reserve side. With the KCCA FC U20, he won the Cambiasso U20 tournament in Dar es Salaam, Tanzania in July 2022.

Mubezi joined KCCA FC in July 2023 on a five-year contract which expires in 2028.
