= Ashraf Mugume =

Ugandan footballer (born 1998)

Personal information
- Date of birth: 16 November 1998 (age 27)
- Place of birth: Kampala Uganda
- Height: 1.71 m (5 ft 7 in)
- Position: Central midfielder

Team information
- Current team: KCCA FC
- Number: 17

Youth career
- 2007-2008: Proline Soccer Academy
- Vipers SC

Senior career*
Years	Team	Apps	(Gls)
2017-2020	Vipers SC		
2018-2019	Police FC		
2020-	KCCA FC		

International career
- Uganda U23
2021	Uganda	2	
- * Club domestic league appearances and goals as of 4th October 2026

Ashraf Mugume (born 16 November 1998 ) Is a Ugandan Professional Footballer who plays as a midfielder for KCCA FC in the Uganda premier league and the Uganda National football team.

== Club career ==
Mugume began his senior career with Police FC, making his Uganda Premier League debut during the 2018–19 season. He joined Vipers SC in 2019 and made four league appearances during the 2019–20 season.

In July 2020, Mugume moved to KCCA FC, where he established himself as a regular midfielder. During the 2020–21 season, he made 15 league appearances, before continuing with KCCA FC in the following seasons.

During the 2021–22 season, Mugume also appeared for Bright Stars before returning to KCCA. He remained with KCCA FC through the subsequent Uganda Premier League seasons, recording 26 appearances in 2021–22, 21 in 2022–23, 26 in 2023–24 and 24 in 2024–25.

== International career. ==
Mugume has represented the Uganda national team. He was called up to the squad for the January 2022 international build-up matches in Turkey and Asia.

He made his senior international debut on 12 January 2022 against Iceland, playing 33 minutes in the 1–1 draw. He subsequently appeared against Iraq and Bahrain during the same tour.

== Awards and Honours. ==
2013 Airtel Rising Stars national champion — Mugume was part of the Kampala Region team that won the national Airtel Rising Stars title. 2015 Copa Coca-Cola champion — He won the Copa Coca-Cola title with St Mary's Kitende. FUFA Juniors League winner — Mugume won the FUFA Juniors League during his youth career with Vipers.

Man of the Match award vs Vipers SC (2024) — After scoring KCCA FC's equaliser in a 1–1 draw with Vipers on 11 November 2024, Mugume received the Man of the Match award, including a Shs 200,000 cash prize.

Dream-team selections — Daily Monitor reported that Mugume was selected for youth dream teams twice, including during his school/youth football career.

== See also ==
- Allan Okello
- Rogers Torach
