= CAPS United F.C. =

Association football club in Zimbabwe

CAPS United
- Full name: CAPS United Football Club
- Nicknames: Makepekepe, Green Machine, Kepekepe Bhora.
- Founded: 1973; 53 years ago
- Ground: National Sports Stadium
- Capacity: 60,000
- Manager: Ian Bakala
- League: Zimbabwe Premier Soccer League
- 2025: 9th
- Website: http://www.capsutd.com
Home colours

CAPS United F.C. is a Zimbabwean football club based in Harare. Formed in 1973, the team rose to prominence in the late 1970s and early 1980s.

== History ==
The team is popularly known as the "Cup Kings" or "Makepekepe", earned due to their success in cup tournaments in the late 1970s and 1980s. It was formerly nicknamed the Manchester Road Boys because of their former address.

They are Harare's second most popular team after their rivals Dynamos F.C., whose fans refer to them as "Madzvinyu" (Lizards). While CAPS United have fewer trophies than Dynamos, they have produced some of the country's best players, including Shacky Tauro and Brenna Msiska.

In 1972, Maurice Kraemer decided to start an official football outfit to entertain workers at Central African Pharmaceuticals, a business based at Manchester Road. Just one year later CAPS Rovers was registered as a team in the Northern Region.

Coach, Steven Kwashi led the team to victory in the 1996 championship. In 2004, Charles Mhlauri took over the club, winning back-to-back championships with the club only losing one game in 2004; a 4–3 home defeat to Highlanders F.C. in a thrilling game at the National Sports Stadium.

Due to the large fan bases and the passionate rivalry between CAPS United and the Dynamos, their games are referred to as the "Harare Derby", and they attract large crowds. As for other rivalries, the matches between CAPS United and Bulawayo side Highlanders FC have been dubbed the "Battle of the Cities".

=== Crest ===
Former logo

Present logo

== Honours ==
- Zimbabwe Premier Soccer League: 5

1979, 1996, 2004, 2005, 2016

- Castle Cup / ZIFA Cup: 9

1980, 1981, 1982, 1983, 1989, 1992, 1997, 2004, 2008

- Zimbabwean Independence Trophy: 4

1992, 1993, 1996, 1997

- Zimbabwean Charity Shield: 2

1996, 2017

- Zambezi - Malawi Challenge Cup: 1

2014

== Performance in CAF competitions ==
- CAF Champions League: 4 appearances

1997 – Third Round
2005 – Second Round
2006 – disqualified in Second Round
2017 – Group Stage (Top 16)

- CAF Confederation Cup: 2 appearances

2009 – First Round
2010 – Second Round of 16

- CAF Cup: 3 appearances

1993 – withdrew in First Round
1994 – disqualified in First Round
1998 – withdrew in First Round

- CAF Cup Winners' Cup: 4 appearances

1981 – Second Round
1982 – Quarter-finals
1983 – Quarter-finals
1988 – First Round

== Coaches ==
- (Zimbabwe) Sarupinda [wasu]
- (Zimbabwe) Ashton Nyazika
- (Zimbabwe) Lovemore Nyabeza
- (Zimbabwe) Freddie Mukwesha
- (Ghana) Nti Bihene Bonzu
- (Zimbabwe) Shaky Tauro
- (Zambia) Kabole
- (Zimbabwe) Mafemba
- (Zimbabwe) Friday Phiri
- (Zimbabwe) Steve Kwashi
- (Zimbabwe) Brenna Msiska
- (Zimbabwe) Luke Masomere
- (Zimbabwe) Justin Mathuthu
- (Zimbabwe) Rahman Gumbo (2002–03)
- (Zambia) Fewdays Musonda (2003)
- (Zimbabwe) Charles Mhlauri (2004–05)
- (Zimbabwe) Lloyd Chitembwe (2008–10)
- (Zimbabwe) Moses Chunga (2010–11)
- (Northern Ireland) Sean Connor (2012)
- (Zimbabwe) Mkhuphali "Mike" Masuku (2012)
- (Zimbabwe) Taurai Mangwiro (2013–14)
- (England) Mark Harrison (2015)
- (Zimbabwe) Lloyd Chitembwe (2015–19)
- (Zimbabwe) Darlington Dobo (2019–22)
- (Zimbabwe) Lloyd Chitembwe (2022–25)
- (Zambia) Ian Bakala (2025–)

== Sponsors ==
In September 2025, CAPS signed a deal with Green Dollar Coin Bank.
