= 1998 CAF Cup =

Tournament

Tournament details
- Dates: 30 January - 29 November
- Teams: 34

Final positions
- Champions: (Tunisia) CS Sfaxien (1st title)
- Runners-up: (Senegal) ASC Jeanne d'Arc

Tournament statistics
- Matches played: 55
- Goals scored: 115 (2.09 per match)

The 1998 CAF Cup was the seventh football club tournament season that took place for the runners-up of each African country's domestic league. It was won by CS Sfaxien in two-legged final victory against ASC Jeanne d'Arc.

== Preliminary round ==
Team 1	Agg.	Team 2	1st leg	2nd leg
APR FC (Rwanda)	3–0	(Eritrea) Asmara Beer	3–0	0–0
Atlético Malabo (Equatorial Guinea)	dq	(Central African Republic) Anges de Fatima	—	—

== First round ==
Team 1	Agg.	Team 2	1st leg	2nd leg
APR FC (Rwanda)	1–3	(Sudan) Al-Hilal Club	0–1	1–2
Gor Mahia (Kenya)	1–4	(Egypt) Zamalek SC	1–0	0–4
Muzinga FC (Burundi)	w/o	(Chad) AS CotonTchad	1–4	—
ASFA Yennenga (Burkina Faso)	2–2 (a)	(Nigeria) Jasper United	2–2	0–0
CD Maxaquene (Mozambique)	1–2	(Madagascar) DSA Antananarivo	1–1	0–1
Uganda Electricity Board	w/o	(Zimbabwe) CAPS United	—	—
Mlandege FC (Tanzania)	w/o	(Ethiopia) Mebrat Hail	—	—
Nchanga Rangers (Zambia)	w/o	(Botswana) Gaborone United	—	—
Atlético Malabo (Equatorial Guinea)	0–7	(Cameroon) Stade Bandjoun	0–6	0–1
Sagrada Esperança (Angola)	0–2^{1}	(Democratic Republic of the Congo) DC Motema Pembe	0–1	0–1
USFAS Bamako (Mali)	2–2 (a)	(Morocco) RS Settat	2–2	0–0
Horoya AC (Guinea)	3–2	(Ghana) Real Tamale United	1–1	2–1
ASC Jeanne d'Arc (Senegal)	2–2 (a)	(Algeria) MC Oran	1–0	1–2
Petrosport FC (Gabon)	w/o	(Republic of the Congo) Union Sport	—	—
Étoile Filante (Togo)	0–4	(Tunisia) CS Sfaxien	0–0	0–4
Energie Sport FC (Benin)	1–8	(Ivory Coast) SO Armée	0–3	1–5

Notes
^{1} 2nd leg April 3 abandoned after 40 minutes at 2-1 for DC Motema Pembe due to thunderstorm; replayed April 4.

== Second round ==
Team 1	Agg.	Team 2	1st leg	2nd leg
Zamalek SC (Egypt)	0–1	(Sudan) Al-Hilal Club	0–0	0–1
Jasper United (Nigeria)	2–3	(Chad) AS CotonTchad	2–2	0–1
Uganda Electricity Board	3–3 (a)	(Madagascar) DSA Antananarivo	3–2	0–1
Nchanga Rangers (Zambia)	2–1	(Ethiopia) Mebrat Hail	2–1	0–0
DC Motema Pembe (Democratic Republic of the Congo)	1–1 (4–3 p)	(Cameroon) Stade Bandjoun	1–0	0–1
Horoya AC (Guinea)	2–4	(Morocco) RS Settat	1–1	1–3
Petrosport FC (Gabon)	0–4	(Senegal) ASC Jeanne d'Arc	0–2	0–2
SO Armée (Ivory Coast)	1–3	(Tunisia) CS Sfaxien	0–0	1–3

== Quarter-finals ==
Team 1	Agg.	Team 2	1st leg	2nd leg
Al-Hilal Club (Sudan)	2–4	(Democratic Republic of the Congo) DC Motema Pembe	2–2	0–2
CS Sfaxien (Tunisia)	2–1	(Madagascar) DSA Antananarivo	2–0	0–1
AS CotonTchad (Chad)	1–6	(Zambia) Nchanga Rangers	1–2	0–4
ASC Jeanne d'Arc (Senegal)	2–0	(Morocco) RS Settat	2–0	0–0

== Semi-finals ==
Team 1	Agg.	Team 2	1st leg	2nd leg
DC Motema Pembe (Democratic Republic of the Congo)	1–7	(Tunisia) CS Sfaxien	1–2	0–5
ASC Jeanne d'Arc (Senegal)	0–0 (3–1 p)	(Zambia) Nchanga Rangers	0–0	0–0

== Final ==
Team 1	Agg.	Team 2	1st leg	2nd leg
ASC Jeanne d'Arc (Senegal)	0–4	(Tunisia) CS Sfaxien	0–1	0–3

== Winners ==
1998 African Cup Winners' Cup Winners
(Tunisia)
CS Sfaxien
First title
