= 1981 Uganda National League =

Football season in Uganda

Uganda National League
- Season: 1981
- Champions: Kampala City Council FC
- Top goalscorer: Issa Ssekatawa, Nytil FC (18)

The 1981 Uganda National League was the 14th season of the Ugandan football championship, the top-level football league of Uganda.

== Overview ==
The 1981 Uganda National League was contested by 17 teams and was won by Kampala City Council FC, while Coffee Kakira, NIC, Lint Marketing Board, Nsambya Old Timers, Mbale Heroes, Wandegeya FC and AT Millers were relegated.

== League standings ==
Pos	Team	Pld	W	D	L	GF	GA	GD	Pts	Qualification or relegation
1	Kampala City Council FC (C)	32	21	6	5	87	28	+59	48	Champions
2	SC Villa	32	20	7	5	68	32	+36	47	
3	Express FC	32	15	9	8	63	37	+26	39	
4	Uganda Commercial Bank	32	16	12	4	50	28	+22	38 (Note: 6 points deducted?)	
5	Nile Breweries FC	32	15	7	10	37	23	+14	37	
6	Nytil FC	32	13	11	8	51	53	−2	37	
7	Masaka Union FC	32	13	10	9	39	38	+1	36	
8	Maroons FC	32	12	8	12	43	45	−2	32	
9	Tobacco	32	12	7	13	37	36	+1	31	
10	Lufula	32	13	5	14	41	53	−12	31	
11	Coffee SC (R)	32	12	5	15	32	41	−9	29	Relegated
12	NIC (R)	32	10	9	13	11	49	−38	29	Relegated
13	Lint Marketing Board (R)	32	9	8	15	36	55	−19	26	Relegated
14	Nsambya Old Timers (R)	32	9	8	15	36	55	−19	26	Relegated
15	Mbale Heroes (R)	32	7	9	16	35	63	−28	23	Relegated
16	Wandegeya FC (R)	32	6	7	19	35	69	−34	19	Relegated
17	AT Millers (R)	32	4	4	24	24	86	−62	16 (Note: 4 bonus points?)	Relegated

(C) Champions; (R) Relegated

== Leading goalscorer ==
The top goalscorer in the 1981 season was Issa Ssekatawa of Nytil FC with 18 goals.
