= 1984 Uganda Cup =

Tournament details
- Country: Uganda

Final positions
- Champions: Kampala City Council FC
- Runners-up: Coffee Kakira

1984 Uganda Cup was the tenth season of the main Ugandan football Cup.

== Overview ==
The competition has also been known as the Kakungulu Cup and was won by Kampala City Council FC who beat Coffee Kakira 3–2 in the final. The results are not available for the earlier rounds

== Final ==
Tie no	Team 1	Score	Team 2
1	Kampala City Council FC	3–2	Coffee Kakira
