= 1985 Uganda Super League =

Football season in Uganda

Uganda Super League
- Season: 1985
- Champions: Kampala City Council FC
- Top goalscorer: Frank Kyazze, Kampala City Council FC (28)

The 1985 Ugandan Super League was the 18th season of the official Ugandan football championship, the top-level football league of Uganda.

== Overview ==
The 1985 Uganda Super League was contested by 14 teams and was won by Kampala City Council FC, while Simba FC and Mbale Heroes were relegated.

== League standings ==
Pos	Team	Pld	W	D	L	GF	GA	GD	Pts	Qualification or relegation (Note: Uganda Grain Milling withdrew. Insecurity in the country and subsequent war in 1985 resulted in Masaka being cut off from Kampala. As a result, FUFA suspended all Masaka Union FC's league games for the 1985 season, only allowing them to return to topflight football in 1986.)
1	Kampala City Council FC (C)	26	18	5	3	54	24	+30	41	Champions
2	Express FC	26	19	3	4	50	23	+27	41	
3	SC Villa	26	17	5	4	52	21	+31	39	
4	Coffee SC	26	15	8	3	43	20	+23	38	
5	Uganda Commercial Bank FC	26	8	9	9	47	43	+4	25	
6	Nile Breweries FC	26	9	7	10	21	34	−13	25	
7	Nytil FC	26	9	3	14	21	34	−13	21	
8	Maroons FC	26	8	4	14	25	39	−14	20	
9	Nsambya Old Timers	26	8	4	14	25	39	−14	20	
10	Tobacco	26	8	5	13	19	33	−14	20 (Note: 1 point deducted?)	
11	Bank of Uganda	26	8	3	15	34	45	−11	19	
12	Uganda Airlines	26	5	9	12	22	35	−13	19	
13	Simba FC (R)	26	4	10	12	31	47	−16	18	Relegated
14	Mbale Heroes (R)	26	7	3	16	26	46	−20	17	Relegated

Source: rsssf.com
(C) Champions; (R) Relegated

== Leading goalscorer ==
The top goalscorer in the 1985 season was Frank Kyazze of Kampala City Council FC with 28 goals.
