= Tanganda F.C. =

Association football club in Zimbabwe

Tanganda Football Club was an association football club based in Mutare, Zimbabwe.

== History ==
Tanganda F.C. competed in the Zimbabwean top flight.
