= 1977 Uganda National League =

Football season in Uganda

Uganda National League
- Season: 1977
- Champions: Kampala City Council FC
- Top goalscorer: Denis Obua, Uganda Police FC (24)

The 1977 Uganda National League was the tenth season of the Ugandan football championship, the top-level football league of Uganda.

== Overview ==
The 1977 Uganda National League was contested by 13 teams and was won by Kampala City Council FC, while Gangama were relegated.

Express FC defeated the Army side Simba FC 2-0 in a crucial league match but were subsequently banned for allegedly being involving in anti-government activities, by the Governor of the Central Province, Col. Abdallah Nasur, who was unhappy about his side's loss. In 1979 the ban was lifted after the regime of Idi Amin had ended.

== League standings ==
Pos	Team	Pld	W	D	L	GF	GA	GD	Pts	Qualification or relegation (Note: Express FC were excluded. The table has 10 more wins than losses.)
1	Kampala City Council FC (C)	26	21	3	2	74	17	+57	45	Champions
2	Simba FC	25	17	4	4	40	17	+23	38	
3	Maroons FC	26	16	5	5	65	32	+33	37	
4	Coffee SC	26	12	7	7	40	29	+11	31	
5	Nsambya Old Timers	26	12	5	9	37	32	+5	29	
6	Lint Marketing Board	26	10	4	12	24	24	0	24	
7	Kilembe Mines FC	26	9	6	11	28	33	−5	24	
8	Uganda Commercial Bank	25	10	4	11	28	33	−5	24	
9	Uganda Police FC	26	8	7	11	30	41	−11	24 (Note: 1 bonus point?)	
10	Lira	24	10	3	11	24	30	−6	23	
11	NIC	26	5	10	11	24	30	−6	20	
12	Nytil FC	26	7	7	12	20	31	−11	20 (Note: 1 point deducted?)	
13	Gangama (R)	26	2	1	23	10	63	−53	5	Relegated

Source: rsssf.com
(C) Champions; (R) Relegated

== Leading goalscorer ==
The top goalscorer in the 1977 season was Denis Obua of Uganda Police FC with 24 goals.
