= 1983 African Cup Winners' Cup =

Tournament details
- Dates: April - 2 December 1983
- Teams: 34 (from 1 confederation)

Final positions
- Champions: (Egypt) El Mokawloon SC (2nd title)
- Runners-up: (Togo) OC Agaza

Tournament statistics
- Matches played: 47
- Goals scored: 127 (2.7 per match)

The 1983 season of the African Cup Winners' Cup football club tournament was won by El Mokawloon SC in two-legged final victory against OC Agaza. This was the ninth season that the tournament took place for the winners of each African country's domestic cup. Thirty-four sides entered the competition, with Ajuda Sports withdrawing before the 1st leg of the first round.

== Preliminary round ==
| Team 1 | Agg. | Team 2 | 1st leg | 2nd leg |
|---|---|---|---|---|
| Maseru Rovers (Lesotho) | 3-2 | (Eswatini) Young Aces | 1-1 | 2-1 |
| Vital'O F.C. (Burundi) | 4-2 | (Kenya) Gor Mahia | 1-2 | 3-0 |

== First round ==
| Team 1 | Agg. | Team 2 | 1st leg | 2nd leg |
|---|---|---|---|---|
| ASEC Abidjan (Ivory Coast) | 5-3 | (Benin) Buffles du Borgou FC | 4-1 | 1-2 |
| Al-Nasr (Benghazi) (Libya) | 1-5 | (Ghana) Sekondi Hasaacas F.C. | 1-1 | 0-4 |
| Bai Bureh Warriors (Sierra Leone) | 2-4 | (Guinea) Horoya AC | 0-1 | 2-3 |
| CAP Owendo (Gabon) | 0-1 | (Nigeria) Stationery Stores F.C. | 0-1 | 0-0 |
| Dragons Yaoundé (Cameroon) | 1-7 | (Togo) OC Agaza | 0-3 | 1-4 |
| CD Elá Nguema (Equatorial Guinea) | 0-5 | (Zaire) AS Vita Club | 0-1 | 0-4 |
| Green Buffaloes F.C. (Zambia) | 6-2 | (Mozambique) CD Maxaquene | 5-1 | 1-1 |
| KMKM FC (Tanzania) | 2-7 | (Zimbabwe) CAPS United F.C. | 2-3 | 0-4 |
| KCC (Uganda) | 2-1 | (Somalia) Horsed FC | 2-0 | 0-1 |
| Maseru Rovers (Lesotho) | 3-4 | (Madagascar) AS Sotema | 3-2 | 0-2 |
| ASF Police (Senegal) | 1-0 | (Morocco) Raja Casablanca | 1-0 | 0-0 |
| Primeiro de Maio (Angola) | 3-4 | (Republic of the Congo) AS Cheminots | 3-2 | 0-2 |
| Stade Malien (Mali) | w/o | (Guinea-Bissau) Ajuda Sports | — | — |
| ASC Trarza (Mauritania) | 1-8 | (Algeria) DNC Alger | 0-0 | 1-8 |
| USCA (Central African Republic) | 0-2 | (Sudan) Al-Ahli Wad Madani SC | 0-0 | 0-2 |
| Vital'O F.C. (Burundi) | 1-6 | (Egypt) El Mokawloon SC | 0-0 | 1-6 |

== Second round ==
| Team 1 | Agg. | Team 2 | 1st leg | 2nd leg |
|---|---|---|---|---|
| ASEC Abidjan (Ivory Coast) | w/o | (Nigeria) Stationery Stores F.C. | — | — |
| Al-Ahli Wad Madani SC (Sudan) | 0-7 | (Zimbabwe) CAPS United F.C. | 0-2 | 0-5 |
| El Mokawloon SC (Egypt) | 4-4 (3-1 p) | (Uganda) KCC | 2-2 | 2-2 |
| AS Cheminots (Republic of the Congo) | 1-4 | (Zaire) AS Vita Club | 1-2 | 0-2 |
| DNC Alger (Algeria) | 3-2 | (Mali) Stade Malien | 2-0 | 1-2 |
| Green Buffaloes F.C. (Zambia) | 2-0 | (Madagascar) AS Sotema | 2-0 | 0-0 |
| Horoya AC (Guinea) | 3-1 | (Senegal) ASF Police | 2-1 | 1-0 |
| Sekondi Hasaacas F.C. (Ghana) | 1-4 | (Togo) OC Agaza | 0-0 | 1-4 |

== Quarterfinals ==
| Team 1 | Agg. | Team 2 | 1st leg | 2nd leg |
|---|---|---|---|---|
| OC Agaza (Togo) | 2-2 (4-2 p) | (Zaire) AS Vita Club | 2-0 | 0-2 |
| CAPS United F.C. (Zimbabwe) | 2-3 | (Egypt) El Mokawloon SC | 2-1 | 0-2 |
| DNC Alger (Algeria) | 1-3 | (Ivory Coast) ASEC Abidjan | 1-2 | 0-1 |
| Green Buffaloes F.C. (Zambia) | 1-2 | (Guinea) Horoya AC | 1-0 | 0-2 |

== Semifinals ==
| Team 1 | Agg. | Team 2 | 1st leg | 2nd leg |
|---|---|---|---|---|
| ASEC Abidjan (Ivory Coast) | 2-2 (a) | (Togo) OC Agaza | 2-2 | 0-0 |
| Horoya AC (Guinea) | 0-4 | (Egypt) El Mokawloon SC | 0-1 | 0-3 |

== Final ==
| Team 1 | Agg. | Team 2 | 1st leg | 2nd leg |
|---|---|---|---|---|
| OC Agaza (Togo) | 0-1 | (Egypt) El Mokawloon SC | 0-1 | 0-0 |

African Cup Winners' Cup Winners
(Egypt)
El Mokawloon SC
Second title
