= 1976 Uganda National League =

Football season in Uganda

Uganda National League
- Season: 1976
- Champions: Kampala City Council FC
- Top goalscorer: Cedric Kasule, SC Villa John Ntesibe, Express FC (22)

The 1976 Uganda National League was the ninth season of the Ugandan football championship, the top-level football league of Uganda.

== Overview ==
The 1976 Uganda National League was contested by 12 teams and was won by Kampala City Council FC.

== League standings ==
Pos	Team	Pld	W	D	L	GF	GA	GD	Pts	Qualification (Note: Six matches were not completed.)
1	Kampala City Council FC (C)	22	15	5	2	55	16	+39	35	Champions
2	Express FC	22	16	2	4	47	14	+33	34	
3	Simba FC	21	12	6	3	31	15	+16	30	
4	Coffee SC	21	9	4	8	29	26	+3	22	
5	Nsambya Old Timers	22	7	7	8	35	33	+2	21	
6	Gangama	21	8	5	8	26	39	−13	21	
7	Prisons FC Kampala	21	7	6	8	27	28	−1	20	
8	Lint Marketing Board	21	6	7	8	26	35	−9	19	
9	Uganda Commercial Bank FC	22	7	4	11	28	37	−9	18	
10	Kilembe Mines FC	19	4	4	11	16	34	−18	12	
11	Lira	18	3	5	10	20	35	−15	11	
12	Uganda Police FC	22	3	3	16	23	51	−28	9	

Source: rsssf.com
(C) Champions

== Leading goalscorer ==
The top goalscorer in the 1976 season was John Ntesibe of Express FC with 22 goals.
