= 1983 Uganda Super League =

Football season in Uganda

Uganda Super League
- Season: 1983
- Champions: Kampala City Council FC
- Top goalscorer: Issa Ssekatawa, Express FC (21)

The 1983 Ugandan Super League was the 16th season of the official Ugandan football championship, the top-level football league of Uganda.

== Overview ==
The 1983 Uganda Super League was contested by 16 teams and was won by Kampala City Council FC, while Mbarara, Tobacco and Spinners were relegated.

== League standings ==
Pos	Team	Pld	W	D	L	GF	GA	GD	Pts	Qualification or relegation (Note: Outstanding matches were not completed.)
1	Kampala City Council FC (C)	28	22	4	2	75	22	+53	48	Champions
2	Coffee Kakira	27	18	4	5	58	24	+34	40	
3	Nile Breweries FC	27	15	8	4	36	13	+23	38	
4	Express FC	28	16	5	7	54	39	+15	37	
5	Bell FC	29	11	9	9	46	47	−1	31	
6	SC Villa	22	12	6	4	35	15	+20	30	
7	Masaka Union FC	28	11	7	10	39	39	0	29	
8	Millers	29	9	10	10	30	31	−1	28	
9	Mbale Heroes	29	10	7	12	30	42	−12	27	
10	Uganda Commercial Bank FC	30	9	7	14	44	48	−4	25	
11	Maroons FC	27	6	11	10	40	51	−11	23	
12	Mbarara United FC (R)	29	8	7	14	29	41	−12	23	Relegated
13	Nytil FC	26	8	6	12	30	32	−2	22	
14	Lufula	27	6	8	13	31	52	−21	20	
15	Tobacco (R)	29	4	9	16	25	51	−26	17	Relegated
16	Spinners (R)	27	1	2	24	22	77	−55	4	Relegated

Source: rsssf.com
(C) Champions; (R) Relegated

== Leading goalscorer ==
The top goalscorer in the 1983 season was Issa Ssekatawa of Express FC with 21 goals.
