= 1980 African Cup Winners' Cup =

Tournament details
- Dates: April - 7 December 1980
- Teams: 28 (from 1 confederation)

Final positions
- Champions: (Zaire) TP Mazembe (1st title)
- Runners-up: (Ivory Coast) Africa Sports

Tournament statistics
- Matches played: 48
- Goals scored: 134 (2.79 per match)

The 1980 season of the African Cup Winners' Cup football club tournament was won by Tout Puissant Mazembe in two-legged final victory against Africa Sports. This was the sixth season that the tournament took place for the winners of each African country's domestic cup. Twenty-eight sides entered the competition, with Dingareh and Ader Club withdrawing before the 1st leg of the first round. No preliminary round took place during this season of the competition.

== First round ==
Team 1	Agg.	Team 2	1st leg	2nd leg
Africa Sports National (Ivory Coast)	w/o	(The Gambia) Dingareh	—	—
Atlético Malabo (Equatorial Guinea)	3-5	(Gabon) US Mbila Nzambi	2-2	1-3
Buffles du Borgou FC (Benin)	4-7	(Togo) OC Agaza	1-2	3-5
Casa Sport (Senegal)	6-1	(Guinea-Bissau) Bula FC	5-1	1-0
Eleven Wise (Ghana)	4-0	(Central African Republic) Sodiam Sports	3-0	1-0
Espérance (Tunisia)	w/o	(Niger) Ader Club	—	—
RC Kadiogo (Republic of Upper Volta)	5-5 (4-2 p)	(Sierra Leone) Wusum Stars	4-1	1-4
KCC (Uganda)	5-2	(Somalia) Marine Club FC	3-1	2-1
NA Hussein-Dey (Algeria)	7-1	(Mauritania) ACS Ksar	7-0	0-1
Matlama FC (Lesotho)	5-2	(Mozambique) Palmeiras de Beira	2-0	3-2
Pan African FC (Tanzania)	5-4	(Madagascar) AS Sotema	4-3	1-1
Township Rollers (Botswana)	3-6	(Zaire) TP Mazembe	2-2	1-4
Dynamo Douala (Cameroon)	bye			
Horoya AC (Guinea)	bye			
Ramogi United (Kenya)	bye			
Shooting Stars F.C. (Nigeria)	bye			

== Second round ==
Team 1	Agg.	Team 2	1st leg	2nd leg
Africa Sports National (Ivory Coast)	abd^{1}	(Gabon) US Mbila Nzambi	3-2	1-1
OC Agaza (Togo)	0-0 (2-1 p)	(Guinea) Horoya AC	0-0	0-0
Casa Sport (Senegal)	1-3	(Algeria) NA Hussein-Dey	1-1	0-2
Eleven Wise (Ghana)	3-2	(Cameroon) Dynamo Douala	2-1	1-1
RC Kadiogo (Republic of Upper Volta)	w/o	(Tunisia) Espérance	—	—
Matlama FC (Lesotho)	1-1 (a)	(Kenya) Ramogi United	1-1	0-0
Pan African FC (Tanzania)	1-2	(Nigeria) Shooting Stars F.C.	0-1	1-2
TP Mazembe (Zaire)	3-2	(Uganda) KCC	1-0	2-2

- 1:2nd leg abandoned, Africa Sports qualified.

== Quarterfinals ==
Team 1	Agg.	Team 2	1st leg	2nd leg
OC Agaza (Togo)	1-2	(Ivory Coast) Africa Sports National	1-1	0-1
Eleven Wise (Ghana)	2-5	(Algeria) NA Hussein-Dey	1-1	1-4
Ramogi United (Kenya)	0-4	(Republic of Upper Volta) RC Kadiogo	0-3	0-1
TP Mazembe (Zaire)	3-3 (3-0 p)	(Nigeria) Shooting Stars F.C.	2-1	1-2

== Semifinals ==
Team 1	Agg.	Team 2	1st leg	2nd leg
Africa Sports National (Ivory Coast)	3-2	(Algeria) NA Hussein-Dey	1-0	2-2
TP Mazembe (Zaire)	3-2	(Republic of Upper Volta) RC Kadiogo	1-0	2-2

== Final ==
Team 1	Agg.	Team 2	1st leg	2nd leg
Africa Sports National (Ivory Coast)	1-4	(Zaire) TP Mazembe	1-3	0-1

African Cup Winners' Cup Winners
(Zaire)
Tout Puissant Mazembe
First title
