= 1991 African Cup Winners' Cup =

Tournament details
- Dates: February - 1 December 1991
- Teams: 36 (from 1 confederation)

Final positions
- Champions: (Zambia) Power Dynamos (1st title)
- Runners-up: (Nigeria) BCC Lions

Tournament statistics
- Matches played: 66
- Goals scored: 169 (2.56 per match)

The 1991 season of the African Cup Winners' Cup football club tournament was won by Power Dynamos in two-legged final victory against BCC Lions. This was the seventeenth season that the tournament took place for the winners of each African country's domestic cup. Thirty-six sides entered the competition, Ground Fource withdrawing before the 1st leg of the first round, Ports Authority disqualified by CAF after 1st leg of the first round and Arsenal withdrawing at the same stage of the competition.

== Preliminary round ==
Team 1	Agg.	Team 2	1st leg	2nd leg
Olympic FC (Niger)	8–2	(Central African Republic) Forces Armées CA	5–1	3–1
Plaisance FC (Seychelles)	1–6	(Kenya) Rivatex FC	1–3	0–3
Primeiro de Agosto (Angola)	9–1	(Namibia) Black Africa	7–0	2–1
Small Simba SC (Tanzania)	2–3	(Eswatini) Mbabane Highlanders	1–0	1–3

== First round ==
Team 1	Agg.	Team 2	1st leg	2nd leg
AS Marsa (Tunisia)	dq	(Sierra Leone) Ports Authority	5–0	w/o
ASFA Yennenga (Burkina Faso)	1–1 (3–2 p)	(Ghana) Asante Kotoko	1–0	0–1
Arsenal FC (Lesotho)	w/o	(Burundi) AS Inter Star	2–0	—
FC BFV (Madagascar)	2–3	(Uganda) Kampala City Council	1–0	1–3
Dragons de l'Ouémé (Benin)	2–3	(Nigeria) BCC Lions	2–0	0–3
Dynamos FC (Zimbabwe)	7–1	(Mozambique) CD Maxaquene	5–1	2–0
SC Gagnoa (Ivory Coast)	2–2 (5–4 p)	(Mali) Stade Malien	2–0	0–2
Ground Force SC (Ethiopia)	w/o	(Libya) Al-Madina	—	—
Mbabane Highlanders (Eswatini)	1–1 (a)	(Sudan) Al-Ittihad SC	1–1	0–0
ASC Linguère (Senegal)	2–7	(Algeria) ES Sétif	1–0	1–7
Olympic FC (Niger)	3–3 (a)	(Cameroon) Prévoyance Yaoundé	2–0	1–3
Primeiro de Agosto (Angola)	1–2	(Republic of the Congo) Diables Noirs	0–0	1–2
Renaissance FC (Chad)	0–4	(Egypt) El Mokawloon	0–1	0–3
Rivatex FC (Kenya)	3–4	(Zambia) Power Dynamos	1–0	2–4
Semassi FC (Togo)	1–2	(Zaire) DC Motema Pembe	0–0	1–2
Shellsport FC (Gabon)	3–1	(Nigeria) Stationery Stores	2–0	1–1

== Second round ==
Team 1	Agg.	Team 2	1st leg	2nd leg
El Mokawloon (Egypt)	2–1	(Uganda) Kampala City Council	2–0	0–1
ASFA Yennenga (Burkina Faso)	3–2	(Tunisia) AS Marsa	3–1	0–1
BCC Lions (Nigeria)	2–0	(Libya) Al-Madina	2–0	0–0
DC Motema Pembe (Zaire)	3–3 (4–3 p)	(Niger) Olympic FC	2–1	1–2
Diables Noirs (Republic of the Congo)	1–3	(Zimbabwe) Dynamos FC	0–2	1–1
ES Sétif (Algeria)	5–2	(Ivory Coast) SC Gagnoa	4–0	1–2
Power Dynamos (Zambia)	4–1	(Sudan) Al-Ittihad SC	2–1	2–0
Shellsport FC (Gabon)	2–3	(Burundi) AS Inter Star	1–0	1–3

== Quarter-finals ==
Team 1	Agg.	Team 2	1st leg	2nd leg
ASFA Yennenga (Burkina Faso)	1–1 (a)	(Zambia) Power Dynamos	1–1	0–0
DC Motema Pembe (Zaire)	2–3	(Algeria) ES Sétif	2–1	0–2
Dynamos FC (Zimbabwe)	1–4	(Nigeria) BCC Lions	1–1	0–3
AS Inter Star (Burundi)	0–0 (5–4 p)	(Egypt) El Mokawloon	0–0	0–0

== Semi-finals ==
Team 1	Agg.	Team 2	1st leg	2nd leg
BCC Lions (Nigeria)	2–1	(Algeria) ES Sétif	1–0	1–1
Power Dynamos (Zambia)	4–3	(Burundi) AS Inter Star	2–1	2–2

== Final ==
Team 1	Agg.	Team 2	1st leg	2nd leg
BCC Lions (Nigeria)	4–5	(Zambia) Power Dynamos	3–2	1–3

=== First leg ===
17 November 1991

BCC Lions (Nigeria)	3 – 2	(Zambia) Power Dynamos
Mancha 13'; Angwe 55'; Zaki 85'		Nyirenda 16'; Makwaza 76'

Surulere National Stadium, Lagos
Attendance: 30,000
Referee: Abdellali Naciri (Morocco)

=== Second leg ===
1 December 1991

Power Dynamos (Zambia)	3 – 1	(Nigeria) BCC Lions
Watiyakeni 41'; Sikanyka 58'; Makwaza 68'		Chilufya 27' (o.g.)

Independence Stadium, Lusaka
