= 1995 CAF Cup =

Tournament details
- Teams: 25 (from 1 confederation)

Final positions
- Champions: (Tunisia) ES Sahel (1st title)
- Runners-up: (Guinea) AS Kaloum Star

Tournament statistics
- Matches played: 48
- Goals scored: 88 (1.83 per match)

The 1995 CAF Cup was the fourth football club tournament season that took place for the runners-up of each African country's domestic league. It was won by ES Sahel in two-legged final victory against AS Kaloum Star.

== First round ==
Team 1	Agg.	Team 2	1st leg	2nd leg
AS Kaloum Star (Guinea)	4–4 (a)	(Ivory Coast) Africa Sports	0–1	4–3
JS Bordj Ménaïel (Algeria)	6–3	(Burkina Faso) US Forces Armées	5–1	1–2
Cape Town Spurs (South Africa)	w/o	(Lesotho) Arsenal FC	—	—
Coton Sport FC (Cameroon)	3–2	(Benin) Mogas 90 FC	2–0	1–2
Djoliba AC (Mali)	2–1	(Zaire) SM Sanga Balende	2–0	0–1
Inter Club (Republic of the Congo)	2–2 (3–2 p)	(Gabon) Petrosport FC	0–2	2–0
AS Inter Star (Burundi)	1–4	(Ghana) Asante Kotoko	1–0	0–4
Kampala City Council (Uganda)	3–1	(Sudan) Hilal Alsahil SC	2–0	1–1
Malindi FC (Tanzania)	3–0	(Eswatini) Mbabane Swallows	2–0	1–0
Prisons XI (Botswana)	w/o	(Mozambique) Ferroviário de Maputo	—	—
SC Atlético (Cape Verde)	dq^{1}	(Tunisia) ES Sahel	—	—
Stade Tamponnaise (Réunion)	1–2	(Zambia) Zamsure FC	1–1	0–1
OC Agaza (Togo)	bye			
Bendel Insurance (Nigeria)	bye			
Primeiro de Maio (Angola)	bye			
Shooting Stars (Nigeria)	bye			

Notes
^{1} SC Atlético were disqualified because the Cape Verdean Football Federation did not name its entrant in time.
teams from Chad, Ethiopia, Kenya, Madagascar, Mauritania and Namibia were disqualified because their federations were in debt to CAF.

== Second round ==
Team 1	Agg.	Team 2	1st leg	2nd leg
AS Kaloum Star (Guinea)	1–1 (4–2 p)	(Angola) Primeiro de Maio	1–0	0–1
Asante Kotoko (Ghana)	2–2 (a)	(Lesotho) Arsenal FC	1–0	1–2
JS Bordj Ménaïel (Algeria)	3–3 (a)	(Tunisia) ES Sahel	3–1	0–2
Coton Sport FC (Cameroon)	1–3	(Togo) OC Agaza	0–2	1–1
Djoliba AC (Mali)	2–1	(Nigeria) Shooting Stars	2–0	0–1
Inter Club (Republic of the Congo)	2–1	(Nigeria) Bendel Insurance	2–0	0–1
Malindi FC (Tanzania)	3–0	(Uganda) Kampala City Council	1–0	2–0
Zamsure FC (Zambia)	1–2	(Mozambique) Ferroviário de Maputo	1–1	0–1

== Quarter-finals ==
Team 1	Agg.	Team 2	1st leg	2nd leg
Asante Kotoko (Ghana)	2–2 (a)	(Guinea) AS Kaloum Star	2–2	0–0
Djoliba AC (Mali)	2–3	(Republic of the Congo) Inter Club	0–2	2–1
ES Sahel (Tunisia)	6–0	(Mozambique) Ferroviário de Maputo	3–0	3–0
Malindi FC (Tanzania)	2–0	(Togo) OC Agaza	0–0	2–0

== Semi-finals ==
Team 1	Agg.	Team 2	1st leg	2nd leg
ES Sahel (Tunisia)	1–1 (4–3 p)	(Tanzania) Malindi FC	1–0	0–1
Inter Club (Republic of the Congo)	0–2	(Guinea) AS Kaloum Star	0–1	0–1

== Final ==
Team 1	Agg.	Team 2	1st leg	2nd leg
AS Kaloum Star (Guinea)	0–2	(Tunisia) ES Sahel	0–0	0–2

== Winners ==
1995 African Cup Winners' Cup Winners
(Tunisia)
ES Sahel
First title
