= 1996 CAF Cup =

Tournament details
- Dates: 30 November 1996
- Teams: 34

Final positions
- Champions: (Morocco) Kawkab Marrakesh (1st title)
- Runners-up: (Tunisia) ES Sahel

Tournament statistics
- Matches played: 58
- Goals scored: 150 (2.59 per match)

The 1996 CAF Cup was the fifth football club tournament season that took place for the runners-up of each African country's domestic league. It was won by Kawkab Marrakesh in two-legged final victory against ES Sahel.

== Preliminary round ==
Team 1	Agg.	Team 2	1st leg	2nd leg
Eleven Men in Flight (Eswatini)	5–5 (a)	(Namibia) Blue Waters	4–2	1–3
Meat Commission (Botswana)	4–2	(Lesotho) Defence Force	4–2	0–0

== First round ==
Team 1	Agg.	Team 2	1st leg	2nd leg
Kiyovu Sports (Rwanda)	4–6	(Republic of the Congo) Patronage Sainte-Anne	4–2	0–4
Kawkab Marrakesh (Morocco)	dq^{1}	(Mauritania) ASC Garde Nationale	—	—
Étoile Filante (Burkina Faso)	2–4	(Algeria) MC Oran	1–1	1–3
Ferroviário de Maputo (Mozambique)	2–0	(Ethiopia) Mebrat Hail	2–0	0–0
FC 105 (Gabon)	0–4	(Cameroon) Unisport FC	0–0	0–4
Étoile Filante du Togo	2–6	(Nigeria) Enugu Rangers	1–0	1–6
SO Armée (Ivory Coast)	3–0	(Benin) Dragons de l'Ouémé	2–0	1–0
Entente Sotrac (Senegal)	2–6	(Tunisia) ES Sahel	1–4	1–2
ASFAG (Guinea)	3–4	(Liberia) Junior Professional	2–1	1–3
Ports Authority (Sierra Leone)	w/o	(Ghana) Real Tamale United	—	—
AS Inter Star (Burundi)	1–5	(Zaire) AS Vita Club	1–1	0–4
Blue Waters (Namibia)	2–6	(Angola) Primeiro de Agosto	1–2	1–4
Kenya Breweries	2–1	Uganda Electricity Board	2–0	0–1
Small Simba SC (Tanzania)	1–1 (a)	(Sudan) Hay Al-Arab SC	1–1	0–0
Meat Commission (Botswana)	1–7	(South Africa) Mamelodi Sundowns	0–3	1–4
US Stade Tamponnaise (Réunion)	w/o	(Zambia) Kabwe Warriors	—	—

Notes
^{1} ASC Garde Nationale were disqualified because their federations were in debt to CAF.

== Second round ==
Team 1	Agg.	Team 2	1st leg	2nd leg
Patronage Sainte-Anne (Republic of the Congo)	0–2	(Morocco) Kawkab Marrakesh	0–0	0–2
MC Oran (Algeria)	4–3	(Mozambique) Ferroviário de Maputo	4–1	0–2
Unisport FC (Cameroon)	2–1	(Nigeria) Enugu Rangers	1–1	1–0
SO Armée (Ivory Coast)	3–4	(Tunisia) ES Sahel	2–1	1–3
Junior Professional (Liberia)	w/o^{1}	(Sierra Leone) Ports Authority	—	—
AS Vita Club (Zaire)	3–1	(Angola) Primeiro de Agosto	3–0	0–1
Kenya Breweries	1–0	(Sudan) Hay Al-Arab SC	0–0	1–0
Mamelodi Sundowns (South Africa)	1–2	(Réunion) US Stade Tamponnaise	1–2	0–0

Notes
^{1} Winner was to be determined in a single match in Freetown, Sierra Leone, due to civil war in Liberia; Junior Professional withdrew.

== Quarter-finals ==
Team 1	Agg.	Team 2	1st leg	2nd leg
ES Sahel (Tunisia)	4–2	(Cameroon) Unisport FC	4–1	0–1
US Stade Tamponnaise (Réunion)	0–1	(Morocco) Kawkab Marrakesh	0–0	0–1
MC Oran (Algeria)	2–2 (1–3 p)	(Zaire) AS Vita Club	2–0	0–2
Kenya Breweries	1–1 (4–2 p)	(Sierra Leone) Ports Authority	1–0	0–1

== Semi-finals ==
Team 1	Agg.	Team 2	1st leg	2nd leg
Kawkab Marrakesh (Morocco)	4–2	Kenya Breweries	4–1	0–1
ES Sahel (Tunisia)	3–2	(Zaire) AS Vita Club	2–0	1–2

== Final ==
Team 1	Agg.	Team 2	1st leg	2nd leg
ES Sahel (Tunisia)	3–3 (a)	(Morocco) Kawkab Marrakesh	3–1	0–2

== Winners ==
1996 African Cup Winners' Cup Winners
(Morocco)
Kawkab Marrakesh
First title
