= Enock Walusimbi =

Ugandan footballer (born 1998)

Personal information
- Date of birth: 12 November 1998 (age 28)
- Place of birth: Kampala, Uganda
- Height: 1.81 m (5 ft 11 in)
- Position: Defender

Team information
- Current team: URA

Senior career*
Years	Team	Apps	(Gls)
2016–2020	Bright Stars	23	(1)
2020–2022	Express FC	45	(2)
2022–2023	Peterhead	6	(0)
2023–	URA		

International career^{‡}
2021–	Uganda	10	(0)
- * Club domestic league appearances and goals as of 01:16, 7 April 2024 (UTC) ‡ National team caps and goals as of 01:16, 7 April 2024 (UTC)

Enock Walusimbi (born 12 November 1998) is a Ugandan footballer who plays as a defender for Uganda Revenue Authority and the Ugandan national team.

== Club career ==
Walusimbi was born in Kampala.

After playing with Shafranto and Nansana United, Walusimbi played for Bright Stars between 2016 and 2020. Walusimbi signed for Express FC on a two-year contract in September 2020, and was handed the club captaincy ahead of the 2020–21 season. He won the Uganda Premier League in his first season with Express.

In summer 2022, it was reported that Walusimbi had held trials at Scottish Premiership club Dundee United. Walusimbi signed for Scottish League One club Peterhead in September 2022. He made 6 league appearances for the club, before being released at the end of the season.

Walusimbi returned to Ugandan football, signing for Uganda Revenue Authority on a two-year contract on 31 July 2023.

== International career ==
Having previously captained the Uganda under-23 side, he made his international debut for Uganda on 29 August 2021 in their 2–1 friendly defeat to Ethiopia.

== Career statistics ==
=== Club ===
As of end of 2022–23 season

Appearances and goals by club, season and competition
Club	Season	League			National Cup		League Cup		Other		Total	
Club	Season	Division	Apps	Goals	Apps	Goals	Apps	Goals	Apps	Goals	Apps	Goals
Peterhead	2022–23	Scottish League One	6	0	1	0	0	0	0	0	7	0
Total			4	0	1	0	0	0	0	0	7	0

=== International ===
As of match played 27 January 2022

Appearances and goals by national team and year
National team	Year	Apps	Goals
Uganda	2021	5	0
Uganda	2022	4	0
Total		9	0
