= 1999 CAF Cup =

Tournament details
- Dates: 14 March - 28 November
- Teams: 30 (from 1 confederation)

Final positions
- Champions: (Tunisia) ES Sahel (2nd title)
- Runners-up: (Morocco) Wydad AC

Tournament statistics
- Matches played: 57
- Goals scored: 148 (2.6 per match)

The 1999 CAF Cup was the eighth football club tournament season that took place for the runners-up of each African country's domestic league. It was won by ES Sahel in two-legged final victory against Wydad Casablanca.

== First round ==
Team 1	Agg.	Team 2	1st leg	2nd leg
USM Alger (Algeria)	4–4 (a)	(Guinea) Horoya AC	2–1	2–3
Al Ahli SC (Khartoum) (Sudan)	2–0	(Ethiopia) Medhin	1–0	1–0
Canon Yaoundé (Cameroon)	2–0	(Rwanda) APR FC	2–0	0–0
Mumias Sugar (Kenya)	1–2	(Mozambique) Ferroviário da Beira	1–1	0–1
Zamalek SC (Egypt)	w/o	(Burundi) Elite FC	—	—
Stade Tamponnaise (Réunion)	6–1	(Madagascar) ASF Fianarantsoa	5–1	1–0
Great Olympics (Ghana)	3–4	(Burkina Faso) Étoile Filante	3–2	0–2
AS Vita Club (Democratic Republic of the Congo)	8–0	(Equatorial Guinea) Deportivo Mongomo	7–0	1–0
Wydad AC (Morocco)	3–1	(Libya) Al-Ahly Benghazi	1–1	2–0
ASC Diaraf (Senegal)	4–0	(Ivory Coast) Man FC	1–0	3–0
Kwara United (Nigeria)	4–0	(Tanzania) Young Africans	1–0	3–0
Saneamento Rangol (Angola)	4–2	(Botswana) Police SC	3–2	1–0
ES Sahel (Tunisia)	5–0	(Mali) Centre Salif Keita	3–0	2–0
Medlaw Megbi (Eritrea)	1–6	(Uganda) Express Red Eagles	1–0	0–6
Nkana FC (Zambia)	8–3	(Eswatini) Royal Leopards	2–2	6–1
CS Sfaxien (Tunisia)	w/o	(Benin) Energie Sport	—	—

== Second round ==
Team 1	Agg.	Team 2	1st leg	2nd leg
Al Ahli SC (Khartoum) (Sudan)	0–7	(Algeria) USM Alger	0–2	0–5
Ferroviário da Beira (Mozambique)	0–1	(Cameroon) Canon Yaoundé	0–0	0–1
Stade Tamponnaise (Réunion)	0–3	(Egypt) Zamalek SC	0–0	0–3
AS Vita Club (Democratic Republic of the Congo)	2–3	(Burkina Faso) Étoile Filante	1–1	1–2
ASC Diaraf (Senegal)	2–3	(Morocco) Wydad AC	1–1	1–2
Saneamento Rangol (Angola)	w/o	(Nigeria) Kwara United	1–1	—
Express Red Eagles (Uganda)	2–4	(Tunisia) ES Sahel	2–2	0–2
CS Sfaxien (Tunisia)	4–1	(Zambia) Nkana FC	4–0	0–1

== Quarter-finals ==
Team 1	Agg.	Team 2	1st leg	2nd leg
CS Sfaxien (Tunisia)	4–5	(Tunisia) ES Sahel	1–2	3–3
Kwara United (Nigeria)	2–5	(Egypt) Zamalek SC	2–1	0–4
Étoile Filante (Burkina Faso)	1–2	(Cameroon) Canon Yaoundé	1–1	0–1
Wydad AC (Morocco)	2–2 (a)	(Algeria) USM Alger	1–0	1–2

== Semi-finals ==
Team 1	Agg.	Team 2	1st leg	2nd leg
ES Sahel (Tunisia)	3–3 (a)	(Egypt) Zamalek SC	2–0	1–3
Canon Yaoundé (Cameroon)	2–2 (5–6 p)	(Morocco) Wydad AC	1–1	1–1

== Final ==
Team 1	Agg.	Team 2	1st leg	2nd leg
ES Sahel (Tunisia)	2–2 (a)	(Morocco) Wydad AC	1–0	1–2

== Winners ==
1999 CAF Cup Winners
(Tunisia)
ES Sahel
Second title
