= DSA Antananarivo =

Malagasy football club

DSA
- Full name: Domoina Soavina Atsimondrano Antananarivo
- Founded: 1980
- Ground: Mahamasina Stadium; Antananarivo, Madagascar
- Capacity: 22,000
- League: Malagasy Second Division

Domoina Soavina Atsimondrano Antananarivo, usually referred simply as DSA, is a Malagasy football club based in Antananarivo, Madagascar. The team has won the THB Champions League in 1998, qualifying them for the 1999 CAF Champions League.

The team currently plays in the Malagasy Second Division. C.A DIGNE

== Achievements ==
- THB Champions League: 2

1997, 1998

== Performance in CAF competitions ==
- CAF Champions League: 1 appearance

1999 CAF Champions League - first round

- 2000 CAF Cup
