= 1997 CAF Cup =

Tournament details
- Dates: 29 November 1997
- Teams: 34

Final positions
- Champions: (Tunisia) ES Tunis (1st title)
- Runners-up: (Angola) Petro Atlético

Tournament statistics
- Matches played: 54
- Goals scored: 143 (2.65 per match)

The 1997 CAF Cup was the sixth football club tournament season that took place for the runners-up of each African country's domestic league. It was won by ES Tunis in two-legged final victory against Petro Atlético.

== Preliminary round ==
Team 1	Agg.	Team 2	1st leg	2nd leg
ASKO Kara (Togo)	dq^{1}	(Benin) Dragons de l'Ouémé	—	—
Simba SC (Tanzania)	5–1	(Ethiopia) Dire Dawa Locomotive	4–1	1–0

Notes
^{1} Dragons de l'Ouémé disqualified for not having submitted players' licenses in time.

== First round ==
Team 1	Agg.	Team 2	1st leg	2nd leg
DSA Antananarivo (Madagascar)	1–1 (4–2 p)	(Réunion) US Stade Tamponnaise	1–0	0–1
Umtata Bucks (South Africa)	w/o	(Botswana) Centre Chiefs	—	—
Kampala City Council (Uganda)	4–2	Rwanda FC	3–0	1–2
AS Bantous (Zaire)	3–3 (a)	(Chad) ASLAD de Moundou	1–1	2–2
Textil do Pungue (Mozambique)	w/o	(Eswatini) C&M Sales	—	—
Petro Atlético (Angola)	7–1	(Republic of the Congo) AS Cheminots	5–0	2–1
Kabwe Warriors (Zambia)	w/o	(Namibia) Chief Santos	—	—
Simba SC (Tanzania)	1–4	(Kenya) AFC Leopards	1–1	0–3
ES Tunis (Tunisia)	8–3	(Togo) ASKO Kara	7–0	1–3
Stade d'Abidjan (Ivory Coast)	3–4	(Burkina Faso) US Forces Armées	2–3	1–1
USM Aïn Beïda (Algeria)	2–1	(Mali) Stade Malien	1–0	1–1
Asante Kotoko (Ghana)	3–2	(Gabon) AS Mangasport	2–0	1–2
Coton Sport FC (Cameroon)	6–0	(Equatorial Guinea) Dragón FC	5–0	1–0
KAC Marrakesh (Morocco)	2–0	(Senegal) ASC Linguère	1–0	1–0
Mighty Barrolle (Liberia)	dq^{1}	(Nigeria) Jasper United	—	—
Horoya AC (Guinea)	1–2	(Morocco) Chabab Mohammédia	0–0	1–2

Notes
^{1} Mighty Barrolle disqualified for not having submitted players' licenses in time.

== Second round ==
Team 1	Agg.	Team 2	1st leg	2nd leg
Centre Chiefs (Botswana)	2–4	(Madagascar) DSA Antananarivo	1–2	1–2
Kampala City Council (Uganda)	1–0^{1}	(Zaire) AS Bantous	1–0	—
Petro Atlético (Angola)	3–0	(Eswatini) C&M Sales	1–0	2–0
AFC Leopards (Kenya)	w/o	(Zambia) Kabwe Warriors	—	—
US Forces Armées (Burkina Faso)	2–5	(Tunisia) ES Tunis	1–1	1–4
Asante Kotoko (Ghana)	2–4	(Algeria) USM Aïn Beïda	1–1	1–3
KAC Marrakesh (Morocco)	1–2	(Cameroon) Coton Sport FC	1–1	0–1
Chabab Mohammédia (Morocco)	2–2 (3–4 p)	(Nigeria) Jasper United	2–0	0–2

Notes
^{1} Played as one leg in Uganda due to the civil war in Zaire (afterwards called Democratic Republic of the Congo).

== Quarter-finals ==
Team 1	Agg.	Team 2	1st leg	2nd leg
DSA Antananarivo (Madagascar)	0–2	(Nigeria) Jasper United	0–0	0–2
Petro Atlético (Angola)	5–1	(Algeria) USM Aïn Beïda	2–0	3–1
Kampala City Council (Uganda)	3–2	(Kenya) AFC Leopards	2–2	1–0
ES Tunis (Tunisia)	5–4	(Cameroon) Coton Sport FC	4–1	1–3

== Semi-finals ==
Team 1	Agg.	Team 2	1st leg	2nd leg
Jasper United (Nigeria)	3–5	(Angola) Petro Atlético	2–1	1–4
Kampala City Council (Uganda)	1–9	(Tunisia) ES Tunis	1–3	0–6

== Final ==
Team 1	Agg.	Team 2	1st leg	2nd leg
Petro Atlético (Angola)	1–2	(Tunisia) ES Tunis	1–0	0–2

== Winners ==
1997 African Cup Winners' Cup Winners
(Tunisia)
ES Tunis
First title
