= 1994 CAF Cup =

Tournament details
- Dates: 4 December 1994
- Teams: 27 (from 1 confederation)

Final positions
- Champions: (Nigeria) Bendel Insurance (1st title)
- Runners-up: (Angola) Primeiro de Maio

The 1994 CAF Cup was the third football club tournament season that took place for the runners-up of each African country's domestic league. It was won by Bendel Insurance in two-legged final victory against Primeiro de Maio.

== Preliminary round ==
Team 1	Agg.	Team 2	1st leg	2nd leg
Boavista FC (Cape Verde)	4–5	(Sierra Leone) Diamond Stars	3–1	1–4
Linare FC (Lesotho)	0–3	(Réunion) CS Saint-Denis	0–1	0–2

== First round ==
Team 1	Agg.	Team 2	1st leg	2nd leg
AS Bantous (Zaire)	2–1	(Rwanda) Mukura Victory Sports	0–0	2–1
Coffee Marketing FC (Ethiopia)	2–5	(Sudan) Al-Mourada SC	2–1	0–4
CS Saint-Denis (Réunion)	dq^{1}	(Zambia) Roan United	—	—
Diamond Stars (Sierra Leone)	1–1 (4–3 p)	(Guinea) CI Kamsar	1–0	0–1
Elect-Sport FC (Chad)	w/o	(Niger) Olympic FC	—	—
Gaborone United (Botswana)	1–2	(Mozambique) Ferroviário de Maputo	1–0	0–2
ASC Garde Nationale (Mauritania)	2–4	(Tunisia) JS Kairouan	1–1	1–3
Gomido FC (Togo)	0–3	(Cameroon) Unisport FC	0–0	0–3
Mogas 90 FC (Benin)	dq^{2}	(Liberia) Fulani FC	—	—
Moneni Pirates (Eswatini)	dq^{2}	(Zimbabwe) CAPS United	—	—
Nakivubo Villa (Uganda)	dq^{2}	(Kenya) AFC Leopards	—	—
AS Nianan (Mali)	3–1	(Gabon) Delta FC	1–1	2–0
RC Bobo Dioulasso (Burkina Faso)	3–4	(Algeria) US Chaouia	2–1	1–3
SCAF Tocages (Central African Republic)	2–6	(Nigeria) Bendel Insurance	1–2	1–4
Young Africans (Tanzania)	1–2	(South Africa) Moroka Swallows	1–0	0–2
Young Ones (Namibia)	w/o	(Angola) Primeiro de Maio	—	—

Notes
^{1} Roan United were disqualified because the Football Association of Zambia did not name its entrant in time.
^{2} Mogas 90 FC, Nakivubo Villa and CAPS United were disqualified because their federations were in debt to CAF.

== Second round ==
Team 1	Agg.	Team 2	1st leg	2nd leg
AFC Leopards (Kenya)	3–0	(Eswatini) Moneni Pirates	2–0	1–0
CS Saint-Denis (Réunion)	3–2	(Mozambique) Ferroviário de Maputo	1–0	2–2
Diamond Stars (Sierra Leone)	1–4^{1}	(Cameroon) Unisport FC	1–2	0–2
Fulani FC (Liberia)	w/o	(Nigeria) Bendel Insurance	—	—
JS Kairouan (Tunisia)	4–4 (6–5 p)	(Mali) AS Nianan	3–1	1–3
Moroka Swallows (South Africa)	1–2	(Sudan) Al-Mourada SC	0–0	1–2
Primeiro de Maio (Angola)	7–5	(Zaire) AS Bantous	5–1	2–4
US Chaouia (Algeria)	w/o	(Niger) Olympic FC	6–0	—

Notes
^{1} Unisport FC disqualified for fielding an ineligible player.

== Quarter-finals ==
Team 1	Agg.	Team 2	1st leg	2nd leg
AFC Leopards (Kenya)	2–2 (a)	(Angola) Primeiro de Maio	2–1	0–1
Al-Mourada SC (Sudan)	w/o	(Sierra Leone) Diamond Stars	—	—
Bendel Insurance (Nigeria)	1–1 (4–2 p)	(Algeria) US Chaouia	1–0	0–1
CS Saint-Denis (Réunion)	5–4	(Tunisia) JS Kairouan	5–3	0–1

== Semi-finals ==
Team 1	Agg.	Team 2	1st leg	2nd leg
Al-Mourada SC (Sudan)	3–5	(Angola) Primeiro de Maio	0–0	3–5
CS Saint-Denis (Réunion)	2–4	(Nigeria) Bendel Insurance	1–0	1–4

== Final ==
Team 1	Agg.	Team 2	1st leg	2nd leg
Primeiro de Maio (Angola)	1–3	(Nigeria) Bendel Insurance	1–0	03 Dec 1994; 0–3

== Winners ==
1994 African Cup Winners' Cup Winners
(Nigeria)
Bendel Insurance
First title
