= List of football clubs in Eritrea =

The following is an incomplete list of association football clubs based in Eritrea.

For a complete list see Category:Football clubs in Eritrea

== A ==
- Adulis Club
- Air Force F.C.
- Al Tahrir
- Asmara Brewery
- Asmara Calcio
- Anseba SC
- Akria FC
- Afabet FC

== B ==
- Bet Mekae FC
- Birra (Asmera Birra)

== C ==
- C.H. Star

== D ==
- Dahlak SC
- Denden FC

== E ==
- Edaga Hamus FC

== G ==
- Geza Banda
- Gejeret

== H ==
- Hintsa FC

== K ==
- Keren FC

== M ==
- Mai Anbessa
- Mai Temenai FC
- Medlaw Megbi
- Mai Adkemom

== R ==
- Red Sea F.C.

== T ==
- Tele S.C.
- Tesfa FC
