= African Cup of Champions Clubs and CAF Champions League records and statistics =

This page details the statistics of the African Cup of Champions Clubs and CAF Champions League.

== General performances ==
=== By club ===
Twenty-seven clubs have won the tournament since its 1964 inception. Al Ahly is the most successful club in the tournament, winning it twelve times. A total of thirteen clubs have won the tournament multiple times: Al Ahly, Zamalek, TP Mazembe, ES Tunis, Wydad AC, Hafia FC, Raja CA, Canon Yaoundé, Asante Kotoko, Mamelodi Sundowns, JS Kabylie, ES Sétif and Enyimba. Twenty clubs have reached the final but never won the tournament.

Egyptian clubs are the most successful, winning nineteen titles. Morocco is second with seven and Tunisia and DR Congo are third with six each. Algeria and Cameroon have five titles each, Ghana, South Africa and Guinea have three each, Nigeria and Ivory Coast has two each and Congo have one. Clubs from Mali, Uganda, Sudan, Togo, Zambia and Zimbabwe have reached the final but never won.

Performance in the African Cup and CAF Champions League by club
Club	Titles	Runners-up	Seasons won	Seasons runner-up
(Egypt) Al Ahly	12	5	1982, 1987, 2001, 2005, 2006, 2008, 2012, 2013, 2020, 2021, 2023, 2024	1983, 2007, 2017, 2018, 2022
(Egypt) Zamalek	5	3	1984, 1986, 1993, 1996, 2002	1994, 2016, 2020
(Democratic Republic of the Congo) TP Mazembe	5	2	1967, 1968, 2009, 2010, 2015	1969, 1970
(Tunisia) ES Tunis	4	5	1994, 2011, 2018, 2019	1999, 2000, 2010, 2012, 2024
(Morocco) Wydad AC	3	3	1992, 2017, 2022	2011, 2019, 2023
(Guinea) Hafia FC	3	2	1972, 1975, 1977	1976, 1978
(Morocco) Raja CA	3	1	1989, 1997, 1999	2002
(Cameroon) Canon Yaoundé	3	0	1971, 1978, 1980	—
(Ghana) Asante Kotoko	2	5	1970, 1983	1967, 1971, 1973, 1982, 1993
(South Africa) Mamelodi Sundowns	2	2	2016, 2026	2001, 2025
(Algeria) JS Kabylie	2	0	1981, 1990	—
(Algeria) ES Sétif	2	0	1988, 2014	—
(Nigeria) Enyimba	2	0	2003, 2004	—
(Democratic Republic of the Congo) Vita Club	1	2	1973	1981, 2014
(Ghana) Hearts of Oak	1	2	2000	1977, 1979
(Tunisia) ES Sahel	1	2	2007	2004, 2005
(Egypt) Ismaily	1	1	1969	2003
(Morocco) AS FAR	1	1	1985	2026
(South Africa) Orlando Pirates	1	1	1995	2013
(Ivory Coast) ASEC Mimosas	1	1	1998	1995
(Cameroon) Oryx Douala	1	0	1965	—
(Ivory Coast) Stade d'Abidjan	1	0	1966	—
(Republic of the Congo) CARA Brazzaville	1	0	1974	—
(Algeria) MC Alger	1	0	1976	—
(Cameroon) Union Douala	1	0	1979	—
(Tunisia) Club Africain	1	0	1991	—
(Egypt) Pyramids	1	0	2025	—
(Democratic Republic of the Congo) AS Bilima	0	2	—	1980, 1985
(Sudan) Al-Hilal	0	2	—	1987, 1992
(Nigeria) Shooting Stars	0	2	—	1984, 1996
(Nigeria) Heartland	0	2	—	1988, 2009
(Mali) Stade Malien	0	1	—	1965
(Mali) Real Bamako	0	1	—	1966
Étoile Filante du Togo	0	1	—	1968
(Uganda) Simba FC	0	1	—	1972
(Egypt) Ghazl Al-Mehalla	0	1	—	1974
(Nigeria) Enugu Rangers	0	1	—	1975
(Ivory Coast) Africa Sports	0	1	—	1986
(Algeria) MC Oran	0	1	—	1989
(Zambia) Nkana FC	0	1	—	1990
(Uganda) SC Villa	0	1	—	1991
(Ghana) Ashanti Gold	0	1	—	1997
(Zimbabwe) Dynamos FC	0	1	—	1998
(Tunisia) CS Sfaxien	0	1	—	2006
(Cameroon) Coton Sport	0	1	—	2008
(Algeria) USM Alger	0	1	—	2015
(South Africa) Kaizer Chiefs	0	1	—	2021

=== By nation ===
Nation	Winners	Runners-up	Winning clubs	Runners-up
Egypt	19	10	Al Ahly (12); Zamalek SC (5); Ismaily SC(1); Pyramids(1)	Al Ahly (5); Zamalek SC (3); Ismaily SC (1); Ghazl Al-Mehalla (1)
Morocco	7	5	Raja CA (3); Wydad AC (3); FAR Rabat (1)	Wydad AC (3); Raja CA (1); FAR Rabat (1)
Tunisia	6	8	Espérance de Tunis (4); Étoile du Sahel (1); Club Africain (1)	Espérance de Tunis (5); Étoile du Sahel (2); CS Sfaxien (1)
DR Congo	6	6	TP Mazembe (5); Vita Club (1)	TP Mazembe (2); AS Dragons (2); Vita Club (2)
Algeria	5	2	ES Sétif (2); JS Kabylie (2); MC Alger (1)	MC Oran (1); USM Alger (1)
Cameroon	5	1	Canon Yaoundé (3); Union Douala (1); Oryx Douala (1)	Coton Sport (1)
Ghana	3	8	Asante Kotoko (2); Hearts of Oak (1)	Asante Kotoko (5); Hearts of Oak (2); Ashanti Gold (1)
South Africa	3	4	Orlando Pirates (1); Mamelodi Sundowns (2)	Mamelodi Sundowns (2); Orlando Pirates (1); Kaizer Chiefs (1)
Guinea	3	2	Hafia FC (3)	Hafia FC (2)
Nigeria	2	5	Enyimba FC (2)	Shooting Stars (2); Heartland FC (2); Enugu Rangers (1)
Ivory Coast	2	2	ASEC Mimosas (1); Stade d'Abidjan (1)	ASEC Mimosas (1); Africa Sports (1)
Congo	1	0	CARA Brazzaville (1)	—
Mali	0	2	—	Real Bamako (1); Stade Malien (1)
Sudan	0	2	—	Al-Hilal (2)
Uganda	0	2	—	Simba FC (1); SC Villa (1)
Togo	0	1	—	Étoile Filante (1)
Zambia	0	1	—	Nkana FC (1)
Zimbabwe	0	1	—	Dynamos FC (1)

=== By semi-final appearances ===
Team	No.	Years
(Egypt) Al Ahly	21	1981, **1982**, **1983**, **1987**, 1988, **2001**, **2005**, **2006**, **2007**, **2008**, 2010, **2012**, **2013, 2017**, **2018**, **2020**, **2021**, **2022**, **2023**, **2024**, 2025
(Tunisia) Espérance de Tunis	14	**1994**‚ 2001, 2003, 2004, **2010**, **2011**, **2012**, 2013, **2018**, **2019**, 2021, 2023, **2024**, 2026
(Democratic Republic of the Congo) TP Mazembe	13	**1967**, **1968**, **1969**, **1970**, 1972, 2002, **2009**, **2010**, 2012, 2014, **2015**, 2019, 2024
(Ghana) Asante Kotoko	10	**1967**, 1969, **1970**, **1971**, **1973**, **1982**, **1983**, 1987, 1990, **1993**
(Egypt) Zamalek	10	**1984**, 1985, **1986**, **1993**, **1994**, **1996, 2002**, 2005**, 2016**, **2020**
(Morocco) Wydad AC	9	**1992**, **2011**, 2016, **2017**, **2019**, 2020, 2021, **2022**, **2023**
(Sudan) Al-Hilal	7	1966, **1987**, **1992**, 2007, 2009, 2011, 2015
(Ivory Coast) ASEC Mimosas	7	1971, 1976, 1992, 1993, **1995**‚ 2002, 2006
(South Africa) Mamelodi Sundowns	7	**2001**, **2016**, 2019, 2023, 2024, **2025**, **2026**
(Guinea) Hafia FC	6	1969, **1972**, **1975**, **1976**, **1977**, **1978**
(Zambia) Nkana FC	6	1983, 1986, 1989, **1990**, 1991, 1994
(Egypt) Ismaily SC	5	**1969**, 1970, 1992, 1995, **2003**
(Cameroon) Canon Yaoundé	5	**1971**, **1978**, **1980**, 1986, 1987
(Algeria) JS Kabylie	5	**1981**, 1984, **1990**, 1996, 2010
(Morocco) FAR Rabat	4	1968, **1985**, 1988, **2026**
(Democratic Republic of the Congo) AS Vita Club	4	**1973**, 1978, **1981**, **2014**
(Nigeria) Enugu Rangers	4	**1975**, 1976, 1978, 1982
(Nigeria) Heartland F.C.	4	**1988**, 1990, 1991, **2009**
(Algeria) ES Sétif	4	**1988**, **2014**, 2018, 2022
(Morocco) Raja CA	4	**1989**, **2002**, 2005, 2020
(South Africa) Orlando Pirates	4	**1995**, 2006, **2013**, 2025
(Nigeria) Enyimba FC	4	**2003**, **2004**, 2008, 2011
(Tunisia) Étoile du Sahel	4	**2004**, **2005**, **2007**, 2017
(Togo) Étoile Filante	3	**1968**, 1975, 1977
(Ghana) Hearts of Oak	3	1972, **1977**, **1979**
(Tunisia) CS Sfaxien	3	1996, **2006**, 2014
(Algeria) USM Alger	3	2003, **2015**, 2017
(Cameroon) Oryx Douala	2	**1964**, 1966
(Guinea) AS Kaloum Star	2	1970, 1981
(Senegal) ASC Jeanne d'Arc	2	1974, 2004
(Cameroon) US Douala	2	**1979**, 1980
(Senegal) US Gorée	2	1979, 1985
(Democratic Republic of the Congo) AS Dragons	2	**1980**, **1985**
(Nigeria) Shooting Stars	2	**1984**, **1996**
(Algeria) MC Oran	2	**1989**, 1994
(Cameroon) Coton Sport FC	2	**2008**, 2013
(Angola) Petro Atlético	2	2001, 2022
(Ethiopia) Cotton Factory Club	1	1964
(Ghana) Real Republicans	1	1964
(Mali) Stade Malien	1	**1964**
(Mali) Real Bamako	1	1966
(Ivory Coast) Stade d'Abidjan	1	**1966**
(Mali) Djoliba AC	1	1967
(Ethiopia) Saint George SC	1	1967
(Kenya) AFC Leopards	1	1968
(Ghana) Great Olympics	1	1971
(Uganda) Simba FC	1	**1972**
(Kenya) East African Breweries	1	1973
(Cameroon) Léopards Douala	1	1973
(Republic of the Congo) CARA Brazzaville	1	**1974**
(Tanzania) Simba SC	1	1974
(Algeria) MC Alger	1	**1976**
(Zambia) Mufulira Wanderers FC	1	1977
(Democratic Republic of the Congo) DC Motema Pembe	1	1979
(Nigeria) Bendel Insurance FC	1	1980
(Democratic Republic of the Congo) FC Lupopo	1	1982
(Senegal) ASC Diaraf	1	1983
(Togo) Semassi FC	1	1984
(Ivory Coast) Africa Sports	1	**1986**
(Cameroon) Tonnerre Yaoundé	1	1989
(Uganda) SC Villa	1	**1991**
(Tunisia) Club Africain	1	**1991**
(Uganda) Express FC	1	1995
(Libya) Al-Ittihad	1	2007
(Zimbabwe) Dynamos FC	1	2008
(Nigeria) Kano Pillars	1	2009
(Nigeria) Sunshine Stars	1	2012
(Sudan) Al-Merrikh SC	1	2015
(Zambia) ZESCO United F.C.	1	2016
(Angola) 1° de Agosto	1	2018
(South Africa) Kaizer Chiefs F.C.	1	2021
(Egypt) Pyramids	1	**2025**
(Morocco) RS Berkane	1	2026

Teams in bold: Finalists in said season. years from 1997 to 2000 the two winners of the two groups were qualifying to the final directly with no semi final stage.

== Records and statistics of Champions League era ==
=== Participation and group stage qualification ===
The following table shows teams that took part in the Champions League since its inception in 1997 (up to 2025-26 season), number and years of their appearances and group stage qualification. Number in bracket next to country name denotes number of teams that represented that country in the competition, while countries in red did not have group stage representative.

Total of 457 clubs participated in the Champions League era (teams included are those that found themselves in the draw, regarding of whether they played or not in that specific season), 199 teams participated only once (29 editions, including 2024-25 edition). 89 teams from 29 countries qualified to group stage (including 2024-25 season) while 27 countries did not have group stage representative.

After 2018 edition CAF moved its club competitions to autumn-spring format, meaning that editions after 2018 were played through two years (e.g. 2018–19, 2019–20). In the table below 2019 stands for 2018–19 season, 2020 for 2019–20 season and so on.

Teams are sorted by number of appearances. If the number is same for two or more teams, team that appeared before in their first appearance are listed first.

Nation	#	Club	Years of participation	Group stage qualification
Algeria (12)	9	USM Alger	1997, 2003, 2004, 2005, 2006, 2007, 2015, 2017, 2020	1997, 2003, 2004, 2015, 2017, 2020
Algeria (12)	9	JS Kabylie	2005, 2006, 2007, 2008, 2009, 2010, 2020, 2023, 2026	2006, 2007, 2010, 2020, 2023, 2026
Algeria (12)	9	ES Sétif	2008, 2010, 2011, 2013, 2014, 2015, 2016^{WG}, 2018, 2022	2010, 2014, 2015, 2016^{WG},2018, 2022
Algeria (12)	7	MC Alger	2000, 2011, 2018, 2021, 2025, 2026, 2027	2011, 2018, 2021, 2025, 2026, 2027
Algeria (12)	7	CR Belouizdad	2001, 2002, 2021, 2022, 2023, 2024, 2025	2001, 2021, 2022, 2023, 2024, 2025
Algeria (12)	3	CS Constantine	1998, 2019, 2024	2019
Algeria (12)	3	JS Saoura	2017, 2019, 2027	2019
Algeria (12)	2	ASO Chlef	2009, 2012	2012
Algeria (12)	2	JSM Béjaïa	2012, 2013	
Algeria (12)	1	MC El Eulma	2015	2015
Algeria (12)	1	USM El Harrach	1999	
Algeria (12)	1	MO Béjaïa	2016	
Angola (9)	15	1º de Agosto	1997, 1999, 2000, 2007, 2008, 2009, 2013, 2014, 2017, 2018, 2019, 2020, 2021, 2023, 2024	1997, 2018, 2020
Angola (9)	15	Petro Atlético	1998, 2001, 2002, 2004, 2007, 2009, 2010, 2020, 2021, 2022, 2023, 2024, 2025, 2026, 2027	2001, 2020, 2021, 2022, 2023, 2024, 2026, 2027
Angola (9)	5	Recreativo do Libolo	2010, 2012, 2013, 2015, 2016	2013
Angola (9)	4	Sagrada Esperança	2005, 2006, 2022, 2025	2022, 2025
Angola (9)	4	Atlético Aviação	2003, 2004, 2005, 2006	2003
Angola (9)	2	Wiliete	2026, 2027	2027
Angola (9)	2	GD Interclube	2008, 2011	
Angola (9)	2	Kabuscorp SCP	2014, 2015	
Angola (9)	1	CR Caála	2011	
Benin (10)	5	Dragons de l'Ouémé	1999, 2000, 2002, 2003, 2004	
Benin (10)	4	Buffles du Borgou	2015, 2018, 2020, 2021	
Benin (10)	3	Mogas 90 FC	1997, 1998, 2007	
Benin (10)	3	Coton FC	2023, 2024, 2025	
Benin (10)	2	Tonnerre d'Abomey	2008, 2012	
Benin (10)	2	ASPAC FC	2011, 2013	
Benin (10)	1	Donjo FC	2005	
Benin (10)	1	Loto-Popo FC	2022	
Benin (10)	1	Dadjè FC	2026	
Benin (10)	1	Sobemap FC	2027	
Botswana (8)	6	Township Rollers	2011^{W}, 2015, 2017, 2018, 2019, 2020	2018
Botswana (8)	4	Jwaneng Galaxy	2021, 2022, 2024, 2025	2022, 2024
Botswana (8)	4	Gaborone United	2010, 2023, 2026, 2027	
Botswana (8)	3	Mochudi Centre Chiefs	2013, 2014, 2016^{W}	
Botswana (8)	2	Notwane FC	1997, 2000	
Botswana (8)	2	Botswana Defence Force	1998, 2003	
Botswana (8)	2	Botswana Police	2006, 2007	
Botswana (8)	1	Mogoditshane Fighters	2002	
Burkina Faso (9)	10	ASFA Yennenga	2000, 2003, 2004, 2005, 2007, 2010, 2011, 2012, 2013, 2014	
Burkina Faso (9)	4	RC Bobo Dioulasso	1997, 1998, 2016, 2019	
Burkina Faso (9)	4	RC Kadiogo	2006, 2017, 2018, 2023	
Burkina Faso (9)	4	Rahimo FC	2020, 2021, 2026, 2027	
Burkina Faso (9)	3	EF Ouagadougou	2002, 2009, 2015	
Burkina Faso (9)	2	US Forces Armées	1999, 2001	
Burkina Faso (9)	2	AS Douanes Ouagadougou	2024, 2025	
Burkina Faso (9)	1	Commune FC	2008	
Burkina Faso (9)	1	AS SONABEL	2022	
Burundi (12)	11	Vital'O FC	1999, 2000, 2001, 2007, 2008, 2010, 2011, 2013, 2016, 2017, 2025	
Burundi (12)	3	Messager Ngozi	2019, 2021, 2022	
Burundi (12)	3	Aigle Noir	2020, 2026, 2027	
Burundi (12)	2	AS Inter Star	2006, 2009	
Burundi (12)	2	LLB Académic FC	2015, 2018	
Burundi (12)	1	Maniema FC	1998	
Burundi (12)	1	Prince Louis FC	2002	
Burundi (12)	1	Muzinga FC	2003	
Burundi (12)	1	Atlético Olympic FC	2012	
Burundi (12)	1	Flambeau de l'Est	2014	
Burundi (12)	1	Flambeau du Centre	2023	
Burundi (12)	1	Bumamuru	2024	
Cameroon (16)	19	Coton Sport	1998, 1999, 2002, 2004, 2005, 2006, 2007, 2008, 2009, 2011, 2012, 2013, 2014, 2015, 2016, 2017, 2019, 2023, 2024	2008, 2011, 2013, 2017, 2023
Cameroon (16)	4	Canon Yaoundé	2003, 2004, 2007, 2009	2003
Cameroon (16)	4	US Douala	2008, 2010, 2013, 2016	
Cameroon (16)	3	Les Astres FC	2011, 2012, 2014	
Cameroon (16)	3	UMS de Loum	2017, 2019, 2020	
Cameroon (16)	2	Colombe Sportive	2026, 2027	2027
Cameroon (16)	2	Fovu Club	2001, 2022	
Cameroon (16)	1	Sable FC	2000	2000
Cameroon (16)	1	Unisport FC	1997	
Cameroon (16)	1	RC Bafoussam	2005	
Cameroon (16)	1	Aigle Royal Menoua	2006	
Cameroon (16)	1	Tiko United	2010	
Cameroon (16)	1	Cosmos de Bafia	2015	
Cameroon (16)	1	Eding Sport FC	2018	
Cameroon (16)	1	PWD Bamenda	2021	
Cameroon (16)	1	Victoria United	2025	
Cape Verde (3)	4	Sporting Praia	2000, 2007^{W}, 2008, 2009	
Cape Verde (3)	1	CD Travadores	1997	
Cape Verde (3)	1	FC Derby	2001	
Central African Republic (6)	7	AS Tempête Mocaf	1997^{W}, 1998^{W}, 2000, 2004^{W}, 2010, 2020, 2026	
Central African Republic (6)	5	Olympic Real de Bangui	2002, 2011, 2013, 2018, 2023	
Central African Republic (6)	2	Anges de Fatima	2001, 2006	
Central African Republic (6)	2	SCAF Tocages	2009, 2019	
Central African Republic (6)	2	DFC 8ème Arrondissement	2012, 2022	
Central African Republic (6)	1	Red Star de Bangui	2025^{W}	
Chad (8)	5	Tourbillon FC	1998, 2001, 2002, 2008, 2011	
Chad (8)	4	Renaissance FC	2000, 2005, 2006, 2007, 2008^{W}	
Chad (8)	4	Elect-Sport FC	2009, 2019, 2020, 2023	
Chad (8)	3	AS CotonTchad	1997, 1999, 2016	
Chad (8)	3	Foullah Edifice	2012, 2014, 2015	
Chad (8)	2	Gazelle FC	2010, 2013, 2021	
Chad (8)	1	AS PSI	2025	
Chad (8)	1	Aiglons N'Djamena	2027	
Comoros (11)	3	Coin Nord de Mitsamiouli	2006, 2008, 2012	
Comoros (11)	3	Fomboni FC	2015, 2020, 2027	
Comoros (11)	3	Volcan Club	2016, 2019, 2023	
Comoros (11)	3	US Zilimadjou	2021, 2025, 2026	
Comoros (11)	2	Djabal Club	2013, 2024	
Comoros (11)	2	Ngaya Club	2017, 2018	
Comoros (11)	1	AJS Mutsamudu	2007	
Comoros (11)	1	Etoile d'Or Mirontsy FC	2009	
Comoros (11)	1	Apache Club	2010	
Comoros (11)	1	Élan Club	2011	
Comoros (11)	1	AS Komorozine de Domoni	2014	
(Republic of the Congo) Congo (9)	8	AC Léopards	2013, 2014, 2015, 2016, 2017, 2018, 2025, 2026	2013
(Republic of the Congo) Congo (9)	7	Diables Noirs	2005, 2008, 2010, 2012, 2014, 2015, 2017	
(Republic of the Congo) Congo (9)	7	AS Otôho	2018, 2019, 2020, 2021, 2022, 2023, 2024	
(Republic of the Congo) Congo (9)	4	Étoile du Congo	2001, 2002, 2007, 2016	
(Republic of the Congo) Congo (9)	2	Munisport de Pointe-Noire	1997, 1998^{W}	
(Republic of the Congo) Congo (9)	2	AS Police	2003, 2006	
(Republic of the Congo) Congo (9)	2	Saint Michel d'Ouenzé	2004, 2011	
(Republic of the Congo) Congo (9)	1	Vita Club Mokanda	2000	
(Republic of the Congo) Congo (9)	1	CARA Brazzaville	2009	
(Democratic Republic of the Congo) DR Congo (8)	23	TP Mazembe	2001, 2002, 2005, 2007, 2008, 2009, 2010, 2011, 2012, 2013, 2014, 2015, 2016, 2017, 2018, 2019, 2020, 2021, 2022, 2023, 2024, 2025, 2027	2001, 2002, 2008, 2009, 2010, 2012, 2014, 2015, 2018, 2019, 2020, 2021, 2024, 2025
(Democratic Republic of the Congo) DR Congo (8)	14	AS Vita Club	1998, 2004, 2011, 2012, 2013, 2014, 2016, 2017, 2018, 2019, 2020, 2021, 2023, 2024	2014, 2017, 2019, 2020, 2021, 2023
(Democratic Republic of the Congo) DR Congo (8)	7	DC Motema Pembe	1997, 1999, 2000, 2005, 2006, 2008, 2009	
(Democratic Republic of the Congo) DR Congo (8)	5	FC Saint Eloi Lupopo	2003, 2006, 2007, 2010, 2026	2026
(Democratic Republic of the Congo) DR Congo (8)	2	AS Maniema Union	2022, 2025	2025
(Democratic Republic of the Congo) DR Congo (8)	2	Aigles du Congo	2026, 2027	
(Democratic Republic of the Congo) DR Congo (8)	1	SC Cilu	2004	
(Democratic Republic of the Congo) DR Congo (8)	1	SM Sanga Balende	2015	
Djibouti (4)	3	Arta/Solar7	2022, 2023, 2025	
Djibouti (4)	2	Djibouti Telecom	2024, 2026	
Djibouti (4)	1	CF Garde Républicaine/SIAF	2021^{W}	
Djibouti (4)	1	AS Port	2027	
Egypt (7)	28	Al-Ahly	1998, 1999, 2000, 2001, 2002, 2004, 2005, 2006, 2007, 2008, 2009, 2010, 2011, 2012, 2013, 2014, 2015, 2016, 2017, 2018, 2019, 2020, 2021, 2022, 2023, 2024, 2025, 2026	1999, 2000, 2001, 2002, 2005, 2006, 2007, 2008, 2010, 2011, 2012, 2013, 2016, 2017, 2018, 2019, 2020, 2021, 2022, 2023, 2024, 2025, 2026
Egypt (7)	18	Zamalek SC	1997, 2002, 2003, 2004, 2005, 2007, 2008, 2011, 2012, 2013, 2014, 2016, 2017, 2020, 2021, 2022, 2023, 2027	1997, 2002, 2005, 2008, 2012, 2013, 2014, 2016, 2017, 2020, 2021, 2022, 2023, 2027
Egypt (7)	4	Pyramids FC	2024, 2025, 2026, 2027	2024, 2025, 2026, 2027
Egypt (7)	3	Ismaily SC	2003, 2010, 2019	2003, 2010, 2019
Egypt (7)	1	ENPPI Club	2006	
Egypt (7)	1	Smouha SC	2015	2015
Egypt (7)	1	Misr Lel-Makkasa SC	2018	
Equatorial Guinea (12)	8	CD Elá Nguema	1999, 2001, 2003, 2010, 2012, 2013, 2015, 2017	
Equatorial Guinea (12)	6	Akonangui FC	2000, 2002, 2009, 2014, 2021, 2022	
Equatorial Guinea (12)	4	Deportivo Mongomo	1998, 2011, 2023, 2025	
Equatorial Guinea (12)	4	Renacimiento FC	2005, 2006, 2007, 2008	
Equatorial Guinea (12)	2	Leones Vegetarioanos	2018, 2019	
Equatorial Guinea (12)	1	Café Band Sportif	1997	
Equatorial Guinea (12)	1	Atlético Malabo	2004	
Equatorial Guinea (12)	1	AD Racing de Micomeseng	2016	
Equatorial Guinea (12)	1	Cano Sport	2020	
Equatorial Guinea (12)	1	Dragón	2024	
Equatorial Guinea (12)	1	Fundación Bata	2026	
Equatorial Guinea (12)	1	15 de Agosto	2027	
Eritrea (6)	5	Red Sea FC	1999, 2000, 2001, 2003, 2006	
Eritrea (6)	1	Mdlaw Megbi	1998	
Eritrea (6)	1	Hintsa FC	2002	
Eritrea (6)	1	Anseba SC	2004	
Eritrea (6)	1	Adulis Club	2005	
Eritrea (6)	1	FC Al Tahrir	2008	
Eswatini (7)	10	Mbabane Swallows	1998, 2006, 2010, 2013, 2014, 2015, 2016, 2018, 2019, 2025	2018
Eswatini (7)	6	Royal Leopards	2007, 2008, 2009, 2017, 2022, 2023	
Eswatini (7)	3	Green Mamba	2012, 2020, 2024	
Eswatini (7)	2	Young Buffaloes	2011, 2021	
Eswatini (7)	2	Nsingizini Hotspurs	2026, 2027	
Eswatini (7)	1	Mbabane Highlanders	2001	
Eswatini (7)	1	Mhlambanyatsi Rovers	2005	
Ethiopia (11)	16	Saint George SC	1997, 2000, 2001, 2003, 2004, 2006, 2007, 2010, 2011, 2013, 2015, 2016, 2017, 2018, 2023, 2024	2017
Ethiopia (11)	2	Ethiopian Coffee FC	1998, 2012	
Ethiopia (11)	2	EEPCO FC	1999, 2002	
Ethiopia (11)	2	Awassa City FC	2005, 2008	
Ethiopia (11)	2	Mekelle 70 Enderta	2020, 2021^{W}	
Ethiopia (11)	1	Dedebit FC	2014	
Ethiopia (11)	1	Jimma Aba Jifar FC	2019	
Ethiopia (11)	1	Fasil Kenema	2022	
Ethiopia (11)	1	CBE SA	2025	
Ethiopia (11)	1	Ethiopian Insurance	2026	
Ethiopia (11)	1	Sidaama Buna	2027	
Gabon (11)	10	AS Mangasport	2001, 2005, 2006, 2007, 2009, 2015, 2016, 2019, 2026, 2027	
Gabon (11)	5	FC 105 Libreville	1998, 1999, 2000, 2002, 2008	
Gabon (11)	3	US Bitam	2004, 2011, 2014	
Gabon (11)	3	CF Mounana	2013, 2017, 2018	
Gabon (11)	2	AS Stade Mandji	2010, 2023	
Gabon (11)	2	AS Bouenguidi	2021, 2022	
Gabon (11)	1	Mbilinga FC	1997	
Gabon (11)	1	USM Libreville	2003	
Gabon (11)	1	Missile FC	2012	
Gabon (11)	1	Cercle Mbéri Sportif	2020	
Gabon (11)	1	Centre Sportif de Bendje	2024	
(The Gambia) Gambia (10)	6	Wallidan FC	1998, 2002, 2003, 2005^{W}, 2006^{W}, 2009^{W}	
(The Gambia) Gambia (10)	5	Real de Banjul	1999, 2001, 2013, 2015, 2026	
(The Gambia) Gambia (10)	4	Gambia Ports Authority FC	2000, 2007, 2011, 2017	
(The Gambia) Gambia (10)	4	Armed Forces FC	2004, 2010, 2018, 2021	
(The Gambia) Gambia (10)	2	Brikama United FC	2012, 2020	
(The Gambia) Gambia (10)	2	Gamtel FC	2016, 2019	
(The Gambia) Gambia (10)	1	Steve Biko FC	2014^{W}	
(The Gambia) Gambia (10)	1	Fortune FC	2022	
(The Gambia) Gambia (10)	1	Hawks FC	2023^{W}	
(The Gambia) Gambia (10)	1	Medina United	2027	
Ghana (10)	12	Asante Kotoko	2004, 2005, 2006, 2007, 2009, 2010, 2013, 2014, 2015, 2020, 2021, 2023	2006
Ghana (10)	11	Hearts of Oak	1998, 1999, 2000, 2001, 2002, 2003, 2004, 2005, 2006, 2008, 2022	1998, 1999, 2000, 2006
Ghana (10)	4	Ashanti Gold	1997, 2007, 2008, 2016	1997
Ghana (10)	2	Aduana Stars	2011, 2018	
Ghana (10)	2	Berekum Chelsea	2012, 2014	2012
Ghana (10)	2	Medeama	2024, 2027	2024
Ghana (10)	1	Heart of Lions	2009	
Ghana (10)	1	Wa All Stars	2017	
Ghana (10)	1	Samartex	2025	
Ghana (10)	1	Bibiani Gold Stars	2026	
Guinea (11)	16	Horoya AC	2000, 2002, 2012, 2013, 2014, 2016, 2017, 2018, 2019, 2020, 2021, 2022, 2023, 2024, 2026, 2027	2018, 2019, 2021, 2022, 2023, 2027
Guinea (11)	5	Fello Star	2005, 2007, 2009, 2010, 2011	
Guinea (11)	4	AS Kaloum Star	1997, 1999, 2008, 2015	
Guinea (11)	2	Satellite FC	2003, 2006	
Guinea (11)	2	Hafia	2020, 2024	
Guinea (11)	1	Club Industriel de Kamsar	1998	
Guinea (11)	1	ASFAG	2004	
Guinea (11)	1	Ashanti de Siguiri	2021	
Guinea (11)	1	CI Kamsar	2022	
Guinea (11)	1	SOA Renaissante	2023	
Guinea (11)	1	Milo	2025	
Guinea-Bissau (5)	3	CF Os Balantas	2007, 2010, 2014^{W}	
Guinea-Bissau (5)	2	Sporting Clube de Bissau	2000, 2008	
Guinea-Bissau (5)	1	Sporting Clube de Bafatá	2009^{W}	
Guinea-Bissau (5)	1	Sport Bissau e Benfica	2018	
Guinea-Bissau (5)	1	FC Canchungo	2027	
Ivory Coast (12)	21	ASEC Mimosas	1998, 1999, 2001, 2002, 2003, 2004, 2005, 2006, 2007, 2008, 2009, 2010, 2011, 2016, 2018, 2019, 2022, 2023, 2024, 2026, 2027	1998, 1999, 2001, 2002, 2003, 2005, 2006, 2007, 2008, 2016, 2019, 2024
Ivory Coast (12)	9	Africa Sports	1997, 2000, 2004, 2005, 2006, 2008, 2009, 2010, 2012	2000, 2004
Ivory Coast (12)	5	Séwé Sport	2007, 2013, 2014, 2015, 2017	2013
Ivory Coast (12)	2	Stade d'Abidjan	2025, 2026	2025
Ivory Coast (12)	2	AFAD Djékanou	2012, 2013	
Ivory Coast (12)	2	AS Tanda	2016, 2017	
Ivory Coast (12)	2	San Pédro	2025, 2027	
Ivory Coast (12)	1	JC Abidjan	2011	
Ivory Coast (12)	1	Williamsville	2018	
Ivory Coast (12)	1	SC Gagnoa	2019	
Ivory Coast (12)	1	SO de l'Armée	2020	
Ivory Coast (12)	1	RC Abidjan	2021	
Kenya (10)	10	Tusker FC	1997, 2000, 2001, 2005, 2006, 2008^{W}, 2012, 2013, 2017, 2022	
Kenya (10)	9	Gor Mahia	2014, 2015, 2016, 2018, 2019, 2020, 2021, 2025, 2027	
Kenya (10)	2	Ulinzi Stars	2004^{W}, 2011	
Kenya (10)	1	Utalii FC	1998	
Kenya (10)	1	AFC Leopards	1999	
Kenya (10)	1	Oserian FC	2002	
Kenya (10)	1	Nzoia United	2003	
Kenya (10)	1	Mathare United	2009	
Kenya (10)	1	Sofapaka FC	2010	
Kenya (10)	1	Kenya Police	2026	
Lesotho (8)	5	Lesotho Defence Force FC	1998, 1999, 2000, 2002, 2005	
Lesotho (8)	4	Matlama FC	2004, 2011, 2020, 2023	
Lesotho (8)	4	Lioli FC	2014, 2016, 2017, 2026	
Lesotho (8)	4	Bantu FC	2015, 2018, 2019, 2021	
Lesotho (8)	3	Lesotho Correctional Services	2008, 2012, 2013	
Lesotho (8)	2	Likhopo FC	2006, 2007	
Lesotho (8)	1	Roma Rovers FC	1997	
Lesotho (8)	1	Lijabatho FC	2027	
Liberia (10)	4	LISCR FC	2012, 2013, 2018, 2024	
Liberia (10)	4	Barrack Young Controllers FC	2014, 2015, 2017, 2019	
Liberia (10)	3	LPRC Oilers	2006, 2020, 2022	
Liberia (10)	2	Invincible Eleven	1999, 2008^{W}	
Liberia (10)	2	Mighty Barrolle	2007, 2011	
Liberia (10)	2	Watanga FC	2023, 2025	
Liberia (10)	1	Junior Professional FC	1997	
Liberia (10)	1	Monrovia Black Star FC	2009	
Liberia (10)	1	Nimba United FC	2016	
Liberia (10)	1	FC Fassell	2026	
Libya (10)	11	Al-Ittihad Tripoli	2003, 2004, 2006, 2007, 2008, 2009, 2010, 2011, 2013, 2022, 2023	2007
Libya (10)	9	Al-Ahli Tripoli	2000, 2001, 2009, 2015, 2016, 2017, 2023, 2024, 2026	2017
Libya (10)	6	Al-Ahly Benghazi	2010, 2014, 2019, 2021, 2024, 2025	2014
Libya (10)	4	Al Nasr Benghazi	2019, 2020, 2021, 2025	
Libya (10)	1	Almahalla SC	1999	
Libya (10)	1	Al-Madina SC	2002	
Libya (10)	1	Olympic Azzaweya	2005	
Libya (10)	1	Al Tahaddy SC	2018	
Libya (10)	1	Al Hilal Benghazi	2026	
Libya (10)	1	Asswehly SC	2027	
Madagascar (15)	7	CNaPS Sport	2011, 2014, 2015, 2016, 2017, 2018, 2019	
Madagascar (15)	3	AS Adema	2003, 2007, 2013	
Madagascar (15)	2	AS Fortior	2000, 2001	
Madagascar (15)	2	Ajesaia	2008, 2010	
Madagascar (15)	2	CFFA	2023, 2027	
Madagascar (15)	1	FC BFV	1997	
Madagascar (15)	1	DSA Antananarivo	1999	
Madagascar (15)	1	SO Emyrne	2002	
Madagascar (15)	1	Ecoredipharm	2004	
Madagascar (15)	1	USJF Ravinala	2005	
Madagascar (15)	1	USCA Foot	2006	
Madagascar (15)	1	Japan Actuel's FC	2012	
Madagascar (15)	1	Fosa Juniors FC	2020	
Madagascar (15)	1	Disciples FC	2025	
Madagascar (15)	1	ASSM Elgeco Plus	2026	
Malawi (6)	9	Big Bullets	2000, 2004, 2015, 2019, 2020, 2022, 2023, 2024, 2025	2004
Malawi (6)	5	Mighty Wanderers	1997, 1998, 1999, 2018, 2027	
Malawi (6)	1	Civo United	2006^{W}	
Malawi (6)	1	ESCOM United	2007^{W}	
Malawi (6)	1	Academie Ny Antsika	2009	
Malawi (6)	1	Silver Strikers	2026	
Mali (5)	21	Stade Malien	2001, 2002, 2003, 2004, 2006, 2007, 2008, 2011, 2012, 2013, 2014, 2015, 2016, 2017, 2018, 2019, 2020, 2021, 2022, 2026, 2027	2026
Mali (5)	13	Djoliba AC	1997, 1998, 1999, 2000, 2005, 2009, 2010, 2011, 2012, 2013, 2023, 2025, 2027	2025
Mali (5)	4	Real Bamako	2014, 2017, 2018, 2024	
Mali (5)	1	CO Bamako	2015	
Mali (5)	1	Onze Créateurs de Niaréla	2016	
Mauritania (7)	11	FC Nouadhibou	2003, 2014, 2019, 2020, 2021, 2022, 2023, 2024, 2025, 2026, 2027	2024, 2027
Mauritania (7)	2	ASC Snim	2008, 2011	
Mauritania (7)	1	ASC Nasr de Sebkha	2004	
Mauritania (7)	1	ACS Ksar	2005	
Mauritania (7)	1	El Ahmedi	2006^{W}	
Mauritania (7)	1	ASC Mauritel Mobile FC	2007	
Mauritania (7)	1	ASAC Concorde	2018	
Mauritius (8)	6	AS Port-Louis 2000	1999, 2003, 2004, 2005, 2006, 2017	
Mauritius (8)	3	Pamplemousses SC	2007, 2018, 2020	
Mauritius (8)	3	Curepipe SC	2008, 2009, 2010	
Mauritius (8)	2	Faucon Flacq SC	1997, 1998	
Mauritius (8)	2	Cercle de Joachim	2016, 2026	
Mauritius (8)	1	AS de Vacoas-Phoenix	2000	
Mauritius (8)	1	Olympique de Moka	2002	
Mauritius (8)	1	La Cure Waves	2027	
Morocco (12)	19	Raja CA	1997, 1998, 1999, 2000, 2001, 2002, 2004, 2005, 2006, 2010, 2011, 2012, 2014, 2015, 2020, 2021, 2022, 2023, 2025	1997, 1998, 1999, 2002, 2005, 2011, 2020, 2022, 2023, 2025
Morocco (12)	11	Wydad AC	2007, 2011, 2016, 2017, 2018, 2019, 2020, 2021, 2022, 2023, 2024	2011, 2016, 2017, 2018, 2019, 2020, 2021, 2022, 2023, 2024
Morocco (12)	9	FAR Rabat	2005, 2006, 2007, 2008, 2009, 2014, 2024, 2025, 2026	2007, 2025, 2026
Morocco (12)	2	RS Berkane	2026, 2027	2026, 2027
Morocco (12)	2	Moghreb Tétouan	2013, 2015	2015
Morocco (12)	2	Difaâ El Jadidi	2010, 2018	2018
Morocco (12)	2	MAS Fez	2012, 2027	2027
Morocco (12)	2	Hassania Agadir	2003, 2004	
Morocco (12)	2	OC Khouribga	2008, 2016	
Morocco (12)	2	FUS de Rabat	2013, 2017	
Morocco (12)	1	Ittihad Khemisset	2009	
Morocco (12)	1	Ittihad Tanger	2019	
Mozambique (9)	8	Ferroviário de Maputo	1997, 1998, 2000, 2003, 2006, 2009, 2010, 2016	1997
Mozambique (9)	6	UD Songo	2018, 2019, 2020, 2022, 2024, 2027	
Mozambique (9)	5	Costa do Sol	1999, 2001, 2002, 2008, 2021	2002
Mozambique (9)	4	Liga Muçulmana	2011, 2012, 2014, 2015	
Mozambique (9)	2	Ferroviário da Beira	2017, 2025	2017
Mozambique (9)	2	CD Maxaquene	2004, 2013	
Mozambique (9)	2	Black Bulls	2023, 2026	
Mozambique (9)	1	Ferroviário de Nampula	2005	
Mozambique (9)	1	GD Maputo	2007	
Namibia (4)	6	African Stars FC	2019, 2020, 2024, 2025, 2026, 2027	
Namibia (4)	3	FC Civics Windhoek	2004, 2006, 2007	
Namibia (4)	2	Blue Waters FC	1997^{W}, 2005	
Namibia (4)	2	Black Africa SC	2000, 2014	
Niger (11)	6	AS GNN	2006, 2007, 2012, 2015, 2024^{W}, 2025	
Niger (11)	4	AS FAN	2011, 2017, 2018, 2026	
Niger (11)	3	Sahel SC	2004, 2008, 2010	
Niger (11)	3	AS SONIDEP	2019, 2020, 2021	
Niger (11)	2	Olympic FC	2000, 2013	
Niger (11)	2	AS Douanes	2014, 2016	
Niger (11)	2	ASN Nigelec	2023, 2027	
Niger (11)	1	JS du Ténéré	2001	
Niger (11)	1	AS Niamey	2003	
Niger (11)	1	AS Police (Niamey)	2009	
Niger (11)	1	USGN	2022	
Nigeria (20)	13	Enyimba FC	2002, 2003, 2004, 2005, 2006, 2008, 2011, 2014, 2015, 2016, 2020, 2021, 2024	2003, 2004, 2005, 2006, 2008, 2011, 2016
Nigeria (20)	6	Kano Pillars	2009, 2011, 2013, 2014, 2015, 2020	2009
Nigeria (20)	5	Rivers United	2017, 2022, 2023, 2026, 2027	2026
Nigeria (20)	5	Enugu Rangers	2006, 2013, 2017, 2025, 2027	
Nigeria (20)	3	Dolphins FC	1998, 2005, 2012	1998
Nigeria (20)	3	Plateau United	2018, 2021, 2023	
Nigeria (20)	3	Remo Stars	2024, 2025, 2026	
Nigeria (20)	2	Lobi Stars	2000, 2019	2000, 2019
Nigeria (20)	2	Heartland FC	2009, 2010	2009, 2010
Nigeria (20)	2	Bridge Boys	2001, 2004	2001
Nigeria (20)	1	Shooting Stars	1999	1999
Nigeria (20)	1	Sunshine Stars	2012	2012
Nigeria (20)	1	Udoji United	1997	
Nigeria (20)	1	Ocean Boys FC	2007	
Nigeria (20)	1	Nasarawa United	2007	
Nigeria (20)	1	Gombe United	2008	
Nigeria (20)	1	Bayelsa United	2010	
Nigeria (20)	1	Warri Wolves	2016	
Nigeria (20)	1	MFM	2018	
Nigeria (20)	1	Akwa United	2022	
Réunion (5)	5	SS Saint-Louisienne	1998, 1999, 2002, 2003, 2017	1999
Réunion (5)	5	US Stade Tamponnaise	2000, 2004^{W}, 2008, 2009, 2010	
Réunion (5)	2	JS Saint-Pierroise	1997, 2007^{W}	
Réunion (5)	1	AS Marsouins	2001	
Réunion (5)	1	AS Excelsior	2006	
Rwanda (3)	22	APR FC	1997, 2000, 2002, 2004, 2006, 2007, 2008, 2010, 2011, 2012, 2013, 2015, 2016, 2017, 2019, 2021, 2022, 2023, 2024, 2025, 2026, 2027	
Rwanda (3)	8	Rayon Sports FC	1998, 1999, 2001, 2003, 2005, 2014, 2018, 2020	
Rwanda (3)	1	ATRACO FC	2009	
São Tomé and Príncipe (4)	2	Sporting Praia Cruz	2014, 2016^{W}	
São Tomé and Príncipe (4)	1	Santana FC	1999^{W}	
São Tomé and Príncipe (4)	1	Inter Bom-Bom	2001	
São Tomé and Príncipe (4)	1	Sporting Clube do Príncipe	2013^{W}	
Senegal (16)	7	ASC Diaraf	2001, 2004, 2005, 2006, 2007, 2011, 2019	
Senegal (16)	6	AS Douanes	1998, 2005, 2007, 2008, 2009, 2016	
Senegal (16)	4	ASC Jeanne d'Arc	2000, 2002, 2003, 2004	2000, 2002, 2004
Senegal (16)	4	Teungueth FC	2021, 2022, 2025, 2027	2021
Senegal (16)	3	Casa Sports	2009, 2013, 2023	
Senegal (16)	3	Génération Foot	2018, 2020, 2024	
Senegal (16)	1	ASC SUNEOR	1997	
Senegal (16)	1	ASEC Ndiambour	1999	
Senegal (16)	1	ASC Port Autonome	2006	
Senegal (16)	1	ASC Saloum	2008	
Senegal (16)	1	ASC Linguère	2010	
Senegal (16)	1	US Ouakam	2012	
Senegal (16)	1	Diambars FC	2014	
Senegal (16)	1	AS Pikine	2015	
Senegal (16)	1	US Gorée	2017	
Senegal (16)	1	ASC Jaraaf	2026	
Seychelles (8)	10	St Michel United	1997, 1998, 2000, 2001, 2004, 2008, 2011, 2013, 2015, 2016	
Seychelles (8)	5	La Passe FC	2003, 2005, 2006, 2010, 2023	
Seychelles (8)	4	Côte d'Or FC	2014, 2017, 2020, 2026	
Seychelles (8)	2	Red Star FC	1999, 2002	
Seychelles (8)	2	Saint Louis Suns United	2018, 2025	
Seychelles (8)	1	Anse Réunion FC	2007	
Seychelles (8)	1	Light Stars FC	2019	
Seychelles (8)	1	Foresters	2027	
Sierra Leone (7)	6	East End Lions	1998^{W}, 2006, 2010, 2011, 2015^{W}, 2026	
Sierra Leone (7)	2	Bo Rangers	2023, 2024, 2025	
Sierra Leone (7)	2	Ports Authority FC	2009, 2012	
Sierra Leone (7)	2	Diamond Stars	2013, 2014	
Sierra Leone (7)	1	FC Kallon	2007	
Sierra Leone (7)	1	FC Johansen	2017	
Sierra Leone (7)	1	Star Sport Academy	2027	
Somalia (4)	3	Mogadishu City Club	2021, 2022, 2026	
Somalia (4)	1	Gaadiidka	2024	
Somalia (4)	1	Dekedaha	2025	
Somalia (4)	1	Heegan	2027	
South Africa (11)	19	Mamelodi Sundowns	1999, 2000, 2001, 2006, 2007, 2008, 2015, 2016, 2017, 2018, 2019, 2020, 2021, 2022, 2023, 2024, 2025, 2026, 2027	2000, 2001, 2016, 2017, 2018, 2019, 2020, 2021, 2022, 2023, 2024, 2025, 2026
South Africa (11)	13	Orlando Pirates	1997, 2002, 2004, 2006, 2010, 2012, 2013, 2019, 2020, 2024, 2025, 2026, 2027	1997, 2006, 2013, 2019, 2025, 2027
South Africa (11)	5	Kaizer Chiefs	2005, 2014, 2015, 2016, 2021	2021
South Africa (11)	4	Supersport United	2004, 2009, 2010, 2011	2004
South Africa (11)	2	Ajax Cape Town	2005, 2009	2005
South Africa (11)	2	Bidvest Wits	2017, 2018	
South Africa (11)	1	Manning Rangers	1998	1998
South Africa (11)	1	AmaZulu	2022	2022
South Africa (11)	1	Santos FC	2003	
South Africa (11)	1	Platinum Stars	2008	
South Africa (11)	1	Cape Town City	2023	
South Sudan (9)	3	Atlabara FC	2014, 2017, 2020	
South Sudan (9)	2	Al Merreikh Bentiu	2025, 2027	
South Sudan (9)	1	Al-Malakia FC	2015	
South Sudan (9)	1	Al-Ghazal FC	2016	
South Sudan (9)	1	Wau Salaam FC	2018^{W}	
South Sudan (9)	1	Al Hilal Wau	2019	
South Sudan (9)	1	Zalan FC	2023	
South Sudan (9)	1	Salaam FC Bor	2024^{W}	
South Sudan (9)	1	Jamus	2026	
Sudan (2)	27	Al-Hilal	1997, 1999, 2000, 2004, 2005, 2006, 2007, 2008, 2009, 2010, 2011, 2012, 2013, 2014, 2015, 2016, 2017, 2018, 2019, 2020, 2021, 2022, 2023, 2024, 2025, 2026, 2027	2007, 2008, 2009, 2011, 2014, 2015, 2017, 2020, 2021, 2022, 2023, 2024, 2025, 2026, 2027
Sudan (2)	23	Al-Merrikh	1998, 2001, 2002, 2003, 2009, 2010, 2011, 2012, 2013, 2014, 2015, 2016, 2017, 2018, 2019, 2020, 2021, 2022, 2023, 2024, 2025, 2026, 2027	2009, 2015, 2017, 2021, 2022, 2023
Tanzania (5)	19	Young Africans	1997, 1998, 2001, 2006, 2007, 2009, 2010, 2012, 2014, 2016, 2017, 2018, 2020, 2022, 2023, 2024, 2025, 2026, 2027	1998, 2024, 2025, 2026, 2027
Tanzania (5)	15	Simba SC	2002, 2003, 2004, 2005, 2008, 2011, 2013, 2019, 2020, 2021, 2022, 2023, 2024, 2026, 2027	2003, 2019, 2021, 2023, 2024, 2026, 2027
Tanzania (5)	2	Azam FC	2015, 2025	
Tanzania (5)	1	Maji Maji FC	1999	
Tanzania (5)	1	Prisons FC	2000	
Togo (9)	6	ASKO Kara	2008, 2021, 2022, 2023, 2024, 2025	
Togo (9)	3	Dynamic Togolais	1998, 2002, 2013	
Togo (9)	3	AS Douanes	2003, 2004, 2006	
Togo (9)	3	ASC Kara	2020, 2026, 2027	
Togo (9)	1	AS Togo-Port	2018	2018
Togo (9)	1	Maranatha FC	2007	
Togo (9)	1	Anges FC	2014	
Togo (9)	1	AC Semassi	2015	
Togo (9)	1	US Koroki	2019	
Tunisia (6)	25	Espérance de Tunis	1999, 2000, 2001, 2002, 2003, 2004, 2005, 2007, 2010, 2011, 2012, 2013, 2014, 2015, 2017, 2018, 2019, 2020, 2021, 2022, 2023, 2024, 2025, 2026, 2027	1999, 2000, 2001, 2002, 2003, 2004, 2005, 2007, 2010, 2011, 2012, 2013, 2014, 2017, 2018, 2019, 2020, 2021, 2022, 2023, 2024, 2025, 2026, 2027
Tunisia (6)	14	Étoile du Sahel	1998, 2004, 2005, 2006, 2007, 2008, 2009, 2012, 2016, 2017, 2018, 2020, 2022, 2024	1998, 2004, 2005, 2007, 2009, 2012^{GW}, 2017, 2018, 2020, 2022, 2024
Tunisia (6)	8	Club Africain	1997, 2008, 2009, 2010, 2011, 2016, 2019, 2027	1997, 2019, 2027
Tunisia (6)	4	CS Sfaxien	2006, 2014, 2015, 2021	2006, 2014
Tunisia (6)	3	US Monastir	2023, 2025, 2026	
Tunisia (6)	1	CA Bizertin	2013	
Uganda (6)	8	SC Villa	1999, 2000, 2001, 2002, 2003, 2004, 2005, 2025	
Uganda (6)	7	KCCA	1998, 2009, 2014, 2015, 2017, 2018, 2020	2018
Uganda (6)	7	Vipers SC	2016, 2019, 2021, 2023, 2024, 2026, 2027	2023
Uganda (6)	5	Uganda Revenue Authority SC	2007, 2008, 2010, 2012, 2013	
Uganda (6)	2	Express FC	1997, 2022	
Uganda (6)	1	Police FC	2006	
Zambia (9)	9	ZESCO United	2008, 2009, 2011, 2015, 2016, 2018, 2019, 2020, 2022	2009, 2016, 2018, 2020
Zambia (9)	9	Zanaco FC	2003, 2004, 2006, 2007, 2010, 2013, 2017, 2018, 2022	2017
Zambia (9)	6	Power Dynamos	1998, 2001, 2012, 2024, 2026, 2027	2026
Zambia (9)	5	Nkana FC	2000, 2002, 2014, 2019, 2021	
Zambia (9)	3	Red Arrows	2005, 2023, 2025	
Zambia (9)	1	Mufulira Wanderers	1997	
Zambia (9)	1	Nchanga Rangers	1999	
Zambia (9)	1	Green Eagles	2020	
Zambia (9)	1	Forest Rangers	2021	
Zanzibar (10)	7	KMKM FC	2005, 2014, 2015, 2020, 2022, 2023, 2024	
Zanzibar (10)	3	Mafunzo FC	2010, 2012, 2016	
Zanzibar (10)	3	JKU	2018, 2019, 2025	
Zanzibar (10)	2	Polisi Dodoma	2006, 2007	
Zanzibar (10)	2	Miembeni SC	2008, 2009	
Zanzibar (10)	2	Mlandege FC	2021, 2026	
Zanzibar (10)	1	Zanzibar Ocean View FC	2011	
Zanzibar (10)	1	Jamhuri FC	2013	
Zanzibar (10)	1	Zimamoto FC	2017	
Zanzibar (10)	1	KVZ FC	2027	
Zimbabwe (12)	8	Dynamos FC	1998, 1999, 2008, 2010, 2011, 2012, 2013, 2014	1998, 1999, 2008, 2010
Zimbabwe (12)	6	FC Platinum	2012, 2018, 2019, 2020, 2021, 2022	2019, 2020
Zimbabwe (12)	5	Highlanders FC	2000, 2001, 2002, 2003, 2007	
Zimbabwe (12)	4	CAPS United	1997, 2005, 2006, 2017	2017
Zimbabwe (12)	1	Monomotapa United	2009	2009
Zimbabwe (12)	1	Amazulu FC	2004	
Zimbabwe (12)	1	Gunners FC	2010	
Zimbabwe (12)	1	Motor Action FC	2011	
Zimbabwe (12)	1	Chicken Inn FC	2016	
Zimbabwe (12)	1	Ngezi Platinum	2025	
Zimbabwe (12)	1	Simba Bhora	2026	
Zimbabwe (12)	1	Scottland	2027	

^{W} denotes team that was part of the draw, but withdrew (or was ejected by the Confederation) before playing any game.
^{WG} denotes team that qualified to group stage but was disqualified with all of its results annulled.

=== Records ===
Last updated on July 02, 2026
Most titles: 12
Al-Ahly (Egypt) in 1982, 1987, 2001, 2005, 2006, 2008, 2012, 2013, 2020, 2021, 2023, 2024

Most appearances: 28
Al-Ahly (Egypt) (1998 to 2002 and 2004 to 2025-26)

Most consecutive appearances: 23
Al-Ahly (Egypt) (2004 to 2025-26)

Most consecutive finals: 5
Al-Ahly (Egypt) (2020, 2021, 2022, 2023 and 2024)

Most consecutive matches without losing: 27
Al-Ahly (Egypt) recorded best undefeated streak through three seasons: 2023 (8 matches), 2024 (14 matches), 2025 (5 matches)

Undefeated through entire season:
Oryx Douala (Cameroon) in 1965 in 4 matches (3-1-0)
Ismaily SC (Egypt) in 1969 in 8 matches (5-3-0)
JS Kabylie (Algeria) in 1981 in 8 matches (6-2-0)
Espérance (Tunisia) in 1994 in 10 matches (7-3-0),2011in in 10 matches (5-5-0) and in 2018-19 in 12 matches (8-4-0)
Al-Ahly (Egypt) in 2005 in 14 matches (9-5-0) and in 2024 in 14 matches (9-5-0)
Sources: and

Most goals scored in a season: 37
Pyramids FC (Egypt) in 2025, 13 goals in preliminary rounds, 14 in group stage, 10 in knockout stage (total 37 in 16 matches, surpassing Al Ahly's previous record of 36 in 2020)

Most goals conceded in a season: 25
Young Africans SC (Tanzania) in 1998, 6 goals in preliminary rounds, 19 in group stage

Biggest win: 10 goals margin
Mamelodi Sundowns (South Africa) - Cote d'Or FC (Seychelles) 11-1 (27 September 2019, First round)
Difaâ El Jadidi (Morocco) - Sport Bissau e Benfica (Guinea-Bissau) 10-0 (10 February 2018, First round)

Biggest aggregate win: 15 goals margin
Mamelodi Sundowns (South Africa) - Cote d'Or FC (Seychelles) 16-1 (5-0 away, 11-1 at home; 14 September, 27 September 2019, First round)

Most goals scored in a single match: 12
Mamelodi Sundowns (South Africa) - Cote d'Or FC (Seychelles) 11-1 (27 September 2019, First round)

==== Group stage records ====
Most group stage appearances: 23
Espérance (Tunisia) (1999 to 2005, 2007, 2010 to 2014, 2017 to 2026-2027)

Most consecutive group stage appearances: 11

Espérance (Tunisia) (2017 to 2026-2027)
Al-Ahly (Egypt) (2016 to 2025-2026)

Most times advanced past group stage: 19
Espérance (Tunisia)

Most time advanced past group stage as group winners: 16
Espérance (Tunisia)

Most consecutive advancements from group stage: 10

Espérance (Tunisia) from 2017 to 2025–26
Al-Ahly (Egypt) from 2017 to 2025–26

Most times eliminated in group stage: 8
ASEC Mimosas (Ivory Coast)
Al-Hilal (Sudan)

Most times qualified to group stage but failed to go past it: 2
Africa Sports (Ivory Coast)
Club Africain (Tunisia)
Multiple teams (37) qualified only once to the group stage but failed to go past it.

Most group stage matches played: 138
Al-Ahly (Egypt)

Most group stage matches won: 71
Espérance (Tunisia) in 112 matches

Most appearances without group stage qualification: 21
APR FC (Rwanda)

Most teams from one nation/league: 20
Nigeria Premier League; 10 teams qualified only once, 9 teams managed to qualify to group stage

Fewest teams from one nation/league: 2
Sudan Premier League; one team qualified 26 times, other qualified 22 times, both qualified to group stage (14 and 6 times respectively)

Teams that won all six group stage matches:
No team did it in 30 editions, 80 groups played.

Undefeated through group stage:
10 teams went undefeated through the group stage. One team did it on five occasions, and three teams did it three times.
Espérance (Tunisia) in 2003 (4-2-0), 2011 (2-4-0), 2017 (3-3-0) and 2018-19 (4-2-0) and 2021-22 (4-2-0)
Al-Ahly (Egypt) in 2005 (4-2-0), 2008 (3-3-0), 2023-24 (3-3-0) and 2025-26 (2-4-0)
Mamelodi Sundowns (South Africa) in 2019-20 (4-2-0), 2021-22 (5-1-0) and 2022-23 (4-2-0)
Étoile Sahel (Tunisia) in 2005 (2-4-0), 2017 (3-3-0) and 2018 (3-3-0)
TP Mazembe (Democratic Republic of the Congo) in 2018 (3-3-0) and 2019-20 (4-2-0)
Hearts of Oak in (Ghana) 2000 (4-2-0)
ASEC (Ivory Coast) in 2006 (3-3-0)
JS Kabylie (Algeria) in 2010 (4-2-0)
Enyimba (Nigeria) in 2011 (4-2-0)
ES Sétif (Algeria) in 2014 (2-4-0)
Wydad AC (Morocco) in 2018 (3-3-0)
Raja CA (Morocco) in 2022-23 (5-1-0)
Orlando Pirates (South Africa) in 2024-25 (4-2-0)
FAR Rabat (Morocco) in 2024-25 (2-4-0)
Pyramids FC (Egypt) in 2025-26 (5-1-0)

Winless in group stage:
24 teams went winless through the group stage. Five teams did it twice.
Platinum (Zimbabwe) in 2018-19 (0-2-4) and 2019-20 (0-1-5)
Al-Merreikh (Sudan) in 2009 (0-3-3) and in 2020-21 (0-2-4)
Al-Hilal (Sudan) in 2017 (0-2-4; forfeited last match) and in 2020-21 (0-4-2)
Zamalek (Egypt) in 2012 (0-2-4) and in 2021-22 (0-4-2)
Orlando Pirates (South Africa) in 1997 (0-1-5)
Young Africans SC (Tanzania) in 1998 (0-2-4)
Sable FC (Cameroon) in 2000 (0-1-5)
ASC Jeanne d'Arc (Senegal) in 2000 (0-3-3)
CR Belouizdad (Algeria) in 2001 (0-1-5)
Costa do Sol (Mozambique) in 2002 (0-0-6)
Ajax Cape Town (South Africa) in 2005 (0-3-3)
Espérance (Tunisia) in 2005 (0-4-2)
Hearts of Oak (Ghana) in 2006 (0-2-4)
Raja CA (Morocco) in 2011 (0-3-3)
MC El Eulma (Algeria) in 2015 (0-1-5)
Coton Sport (Cameroon) in 2017 (0-0-6) and 2022-23 (0-0-6)
Ismaily (Egypt) in 2018-19 (0-2-4)
1° do Agosto (Angola) in 2019-20 (0-4-2)
ZESCO United (Zambia) in 2019-20 (0-3-3)
Petró Atlético (Angola) in 2019-20 (0-4-2)
USM Alger (Algeria) in 2019-20 (0-3-3)
Petró Atlético (Angola) in 2020-21 (0-1-5)
Jwaneng Galaxy F.C. (Botswana) in 2021-22 (0-1-5)
G.D. Sagrada Esperança (Angola) in 2021-22 (0-2-4)
Vipers SC (Uganda) in 2022-23 (0-2-4)
Stade d'Abidjan (Ivory Coast) in 2024-25 (0-1-5)
AS Maniema Union (Democratic Republic of the Congo) in 2024-25 (0-3-3)
Djoliba AC (Mali) in 2024-25 (0-2-4)
JS Kabylie (Algeria) in 2025-26 (0-3-3)
Rivers United F.C. (Nigeria) in 2025-26 (0-1-5)

Teams that lost each of 6 group stage matches:
Costa do Sol (Mozambique) in 2002
Coton Sport (Cameroon) in 2017 and 2022-23

Fewest points and went past group stage:
7 points Wydad AC (Morocco) in 2011 (1-4-1)

Most points and failed to go past group stage:
11 points Zanaco (Zambia) in 2017 (3-2-1)

Most goals scored in group stage (single season): 17
Raja CA (Morocco) in 2022-23

Most goals scored in group stage (total): 203
Al-Ahly (Egypt) in 102 matches

Most goals conceded in group stage (single season): 19
Young Africans SC (Tanzania) in 1998

Most goals conceded in group stage (total): 98
Al-Ahly (Egypt) in 102 matches

Fewest goals scored in group stage (single season): 0
Hearts of Oak (Ghana) in 2006, 0-7 goal difference
Djoliba AC (Mali) in 2024-25 0-12 goal difference

Fewest goals conceded in group stage (single season): 1
Espérance (Tunisia) in 1999
ASEC (Ivory Coast) in 2006
TP Mazembe (Democratic Republic of the Congo) in 2015
Al-Ahly (Egypt) in 2024

Best goal difference in group stage (single season): +14
Raja CA (Morocco) in 2022-23, 17-3 goal difference

Worst goal differential in group stage (single season): -16
Costa do Sol (Mozambique) in 2002, 1-17 goal difference

Biggest win in a group stage match: 8 goals margin
TP Mazembe (Democratic Republic of the Congo) - Club Africain (Tunisia) 8-0 (2 February 2019)

Most goals scored in a group stage match:
Dynamos (Zimbabwe) 7-2 Saint-Louisienne (Réunion)

== Players ==
=== Top goalscorers of more than one season ===
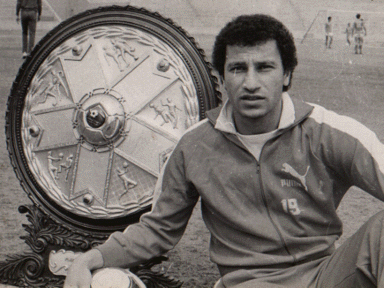
Mahmoud El Khatib of Egypt, Al Ahly is the most top goalscorer of more than one season of CAF Champions League with 5 seasons: 1977, 1981, 1982, 1983, 1987 seasons.

No.	Player	Representing	Years	Goals
1	(Egypt) Mahmoud El Khatib	(Egypt) Al Ahly	1977	4
1	(Egypt) Mahmoud El Khatib	(Egypt) Al Ahly	1981	6
1	(Egypt) Mahmoud El Khatib	(Egypt) Al Ahly	1982	6
1	(Egypt) Mahmoud El Khatib	(Egypt) Al Ahly	1983	6
1	(Egypt) Mahmoud El Khatib	(Egypt) Al Ahly	1987	5
2	(Democratic Republic of the Congo) Pierre Kalala	(Democratic Republic of the Congo) TP Englebert	1967	2
2	(Democratic Republic of the Congo) Pierre Kalala	(Democratic Republic of the Congo) TP Englebert	1968	7
2	(Democratic Republic of the Congo) Pierre Kalala	(Democratic Republic of the Congo) TP Englebert	1970	4
3	(Mali) Salif Kéïta	(Mali) Stade Malien	1964–65	3
3	(Mali) Salif Kéïta	(Mali) Stade Malien	1966	14

=== Top goalscorers ===
Year	Footballer	Club	Goals
African Cup of Champions Clubs era
1964–65	(Mali) Salif Kéïta	(Mali) Stade Malien	3
1966	(Mali) Salif Kéïta	(Mali) Stade Malien	14
1967	(United Arab Republic) Mahmoud Badawi (United Arab Republic) Ahmed El-Qazzaz (Ghana) Osei Kofi (Democratic Republic of the Congo) Pierre Kalala (Democratic Republic of the Congo) Leonard Saidi (Democratic Republic of the Congo) Kamunda Tshinabu	(United Arab Republic) El Olympi (United Arab Republic) El Olympi (Ghana) Asante Kotoko (Democratic Republic of the Congo) TP Englebert (Democratic Republic of the Congo) TP Englebert (Democratic Republic of the Congo) TP Englebert	2
1968	(Democratic Republic of the Congo) Pierre Kalala	(Democratic Republic of the Congo) TP Englebert	7
1969	(United Arab Republic) Ali Abo Greisha	(United Arab Republic) Ismaily	7
1970	(Democratic Republic of the Congo) Pierre Kalala	(Democratic Republic of the Congo) TP Englebert	4
1971	(Ghana) Cecil Jones Attuquayefio	(Ghana) Great Olympics	6
1972	(Zambia) Godfrey Chitalu	(Zambia) Kabwe Warriors	13
1973	(Guinea) Chérif Souleymane	(Guinea) Hafia FC	5
1974	(Republic of the Congo) Paul Moukila	(Republic of the Congo) CARA Brazzaville	10
1975	(Guinea) N’Jo Léa	(Guinea) Hafia FC	4
1976	(Algeria) Abdeslam Bousri	(Algeria) MC Alger	5
1977	(Egypt) Mahmoud El Khatib	(Egypt) Al Ahly	4
1978	(Guinea) Seydouba Bangoura (Zaire) Mayanga Maku	(Guinea) Hafia FC (Zaire) AS Vita Club	2
1979	(Tanzania) Ally Thuwen	(Tanzania) Simba SC	3
1980	(Cameroon) Jean Manga Onguéné	(Cameroon) Canon Yaoundé	9
1981	(Egypt) Mahmoud El Khatib	(Egypt) Al Ahly	6
1982	(Egypt) Mahmoud El Khatib	(Egypt) Al Ahly	6
1983	(Egypt) Mahmoud El Khatib	(Egypt) Al Ahly	6
1984	(Nigeria) Felix Owolabi	(Nigeria) Shooting Stars	5
1985	(Morocco) Saad Dahane (Morocco) Abdellah Haidamou (Morocco) Abderrazak Khairi (Algeria) Mokhtar Chibani	(Morocco) FAR Rabat (Morocco) FAR Rabat (Morocco) FAR Rabat (Algeria) GCR Mascara	4
1986	(Egypt) Gamal Abdel Hamid	(Egypt) Zamalek	7
1987	(Egypt) Mahmoud El Khatib	(Egypt) Al Ahly	5
1988	(Morocco) Abdeslam Laghrissi	(Morocco) FAR Rabat	7
1989	(Algeria) Mourad Meziane	(Algeria) MC Oran	5
1990	(Algeria) Nacer Bouiche	(Algeria) JS Kabylie	7
1991	(Tunisia) Faouzi Rouissi (Tunisia) Adel Sellimi	(Tunisia) Club Africain (Tunisia) Club Africain	6
1992	(Zambia) Kenneth Malitoli	(Zambia) Nkana Red Devils	6
1993	(Egypt) Ayman Mansour	(Egypt) Zamalek	5
1994	(Nigeria) Anthony Nwaigwe	(Nigeria) Iwuanyanwu Nationale	7
1995	(Ghana) Kofi Deblah (Ivory Coast) Sékou Bamba	(Ghana) Obuasi Goldfields (Ivory Coast) ASEC Mimosas	4
1996	(Egypt) Ahmed El-Kass (Egypt) Ayman Mansour (Egypt) Tarek Mostafa (Egypt) Mohamed Sabry (Rwanda) Julien Ndagano (Tunisia) Skander Souayah	(Egypt) Zamalek (Egypt) Zamalek (Egypt) Zamalek (Egypt) Zamalek (Rwanda) APR FC (Tunisia) CS Sfaxien	2
Champions League era
1997	(Togo) Kossi Noutsoudje	(Ghana) Obuasi Goldfields	7
1998	(Ethiopia) Aseged Tesfaye (Morocco) Reda Ereyahi	(Ethiopia) Ethiopian Coffee SC (Morocco) Raja CA	6
1999	(Egypt) Hossam Hassan	(Egypt) Al Ahly	6
2000	(Ghana) Emmanuel Osei Kuffour	(Ghana) Hearts of Oak	10
2001	(Democratic Republic of the Congo) Kapela Mbiyavanga	(Angola) Petro Atlético	9
2002	(Egypt) Ahmed Belal (Ivory Coast) Antonin Koutouan (Morocco) Hicham Aboucherouane	(Egypt) Al Ahly (Ivory Coast) ASEC Mimosas (Morocco) Raja CA	7
2003	(Mali) Dramane Traoré	(Egypt) Ismaily	8
2004	(Mali) Mamadou Diallo	(Algeria) USM Alger	10
2005	(Egypt) Mohamed Barakat (Ghana) Joetex Frimpong	(Egypt) Al Ahly (Nigeria) Enyimba FC	7
2006	(Ivory Coast) Didier Ya Konan	(Ivory Coast) ASEC Mimosas	9
2007	(Democratic Republic of the Congo) Trésor Mputu	(Democratic Republic of the Congo) TP Mazembe	9
2008	(Nigeria) Stephen Worgu	(Nigeria) Enyimba FC	13
2009	(Democratic Republic of the Congo) Dioko Kaluyituka	(Democratic Republic of the Congo) TP Mazembe	8
2010	(Nigeria) Michael Eneramo	(Tunisia) Espérance de Tunis	8
2011	(Zimbabwe) Edward Sadomba	(Sudan) Al-Hilal	7
2012	(Ghana) Emmanuel Clottey	(Ghana) Berekum Chelsea	12
2013	(Cameroon) Alexis Yougouda Kada	(Cameroon) Coton Sport	7
2014	(Algeria) El Hedi Belameiri (Tunisia) Haythem Jouini (Democratic Republic of the Congo) Ndombe Mubele (Tanzania) Mrisho Ngasa	(Algeria) ES Sétif (Tunisia) Espérance de Tunis (Democratic Republic of the Congo) AS Vita Club (Tanzania) Young Africans	6
2015	(Sudan) Bakri Al-Madina (Tanzania) Mbwana Samatta	(Sudan) Al-Merrikh (Democratic Republic of the Congo) TP Mazembe	7
2016	(Nigeria) Mfon Udoh	(Nigeria) Enyimba	9
2017	(Tunisia) Taha Yassine Khenissi (Ethiopia) Saladin Said	(Tunisia) Espérance de Tunis (Ethiopia) Saint George	7
2018	(Tunisia) Anice Badri	(Tunisia) Espérance de Tunis	8
2018–19	(Libya) Moataz Al-Mehdi	(Libya) Al-Nasr	7
2019–20	(Democratic Republic of the Congo) Jackson Muleka	(Democratic Republic of the Congo) TP Mazembe	7
2020–21	(Egypt) Mohamed Sherif	(Egypt) Al Ahly	6
2021–22	(Brazil) Tiago Azulão	(Angola) Atlético Petróleos de Luanda	6
2022–23	(Egypt) Mahmoud Kahraba (Namibia) Peter Shalulile	(Egypt) Al Ahly (South Africa) Mamelodi Sundowns	6
2023–24	(Ivory Coast) Sankara Karamoko	(Ivory Coast) ASEC Mimosas	4
2024–25	(Democratic Republic of the Congo) Fiston Mayele	(Egypt) Pyramids	6
2025–26	(Egypt) Trézéguet	(Egypt) Al Ahly	6

== Hat-tricks ==
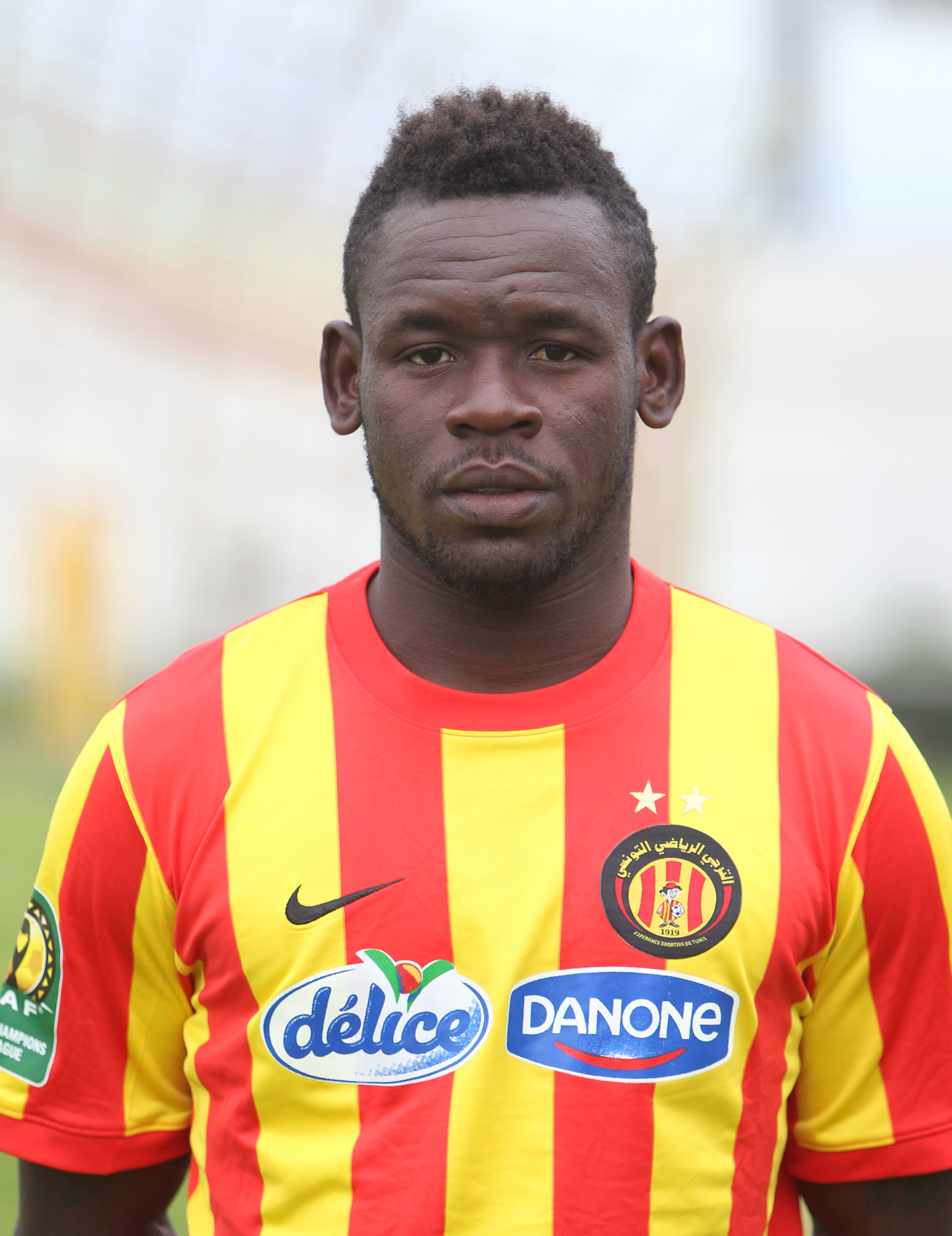
Emmanuel Clottey of Ghana, Berekum Chelsea (pictured here during his time with Espérance S T) is one of the players to have scored more than one hat-trick in the CAF Champions League.

Since 2009

Rank	Player	Hat-tricks	Last hat-trick
1	(Tanzania) Mrisho Ngasa	3	15 February 2014
2	(Ghana) Emmanuel Clottey	2	7 July 2012
3	(Morocco) Mouhcine Iajour	2	21 March 2015
4	(Democratic Republic of the Congo) Fiston Mayele	2	17 September 2022

=== List of hat-tricks ===
Player	For	Against	Result	Date
(Morocco) Mustapha Allaoui	(Morocco) FAR Rabat	(Cape Verde) Sporting Clube da Praia	6–1	31 January 2009
(Kenya) Boniface Ambani^{4}	(Tanzania) Young Africans	(Comoros) Etoile d'Or	8–1	31 January 2009
(Tanzania) Mrisho Ngasa^{4}	(Tanzania) Young Africans	(Comoros) Etoile d'Or	6–0	15 February 2009
(Zambia) Jonas Sakuwaha	(Zambia) ZESCO United	(Sudan) Al-Merreikh	3–2	15 August 2009
(Democratic Republic of the Congo) Dioko Kaliyutuka	(Democratic Republic of the Congo) TP Mazembe	(Zimbabwe) Monomotapa United	5–0	15 August 2009
(Angola) Joka	(Angola) Atlético Petróleos Luanda	(Equatorial Guinea) Elá Nguema	6–1	28 February 2010
(Morocco) Hassan Tair	(Morocco) Raja CA	(Chad) Tourbillon	10–1	28 January 2011
(Ivory Coast) Adama Bakayoko	(Ivory Coast) ASEC Mimosas	(Mauritania) CF Cansado	7–0	30 January 2011
(Zambia) Alfred Luputa	(Zambia) ZESCO United	(Eswatini) Young Buffaloes	5–0	19 March 2011
(Cameroon) Yannick N'Djeng	(Tunisia) Espérance ST	(Algeria) MC Alger	4–0	10 September 2011
(Algeria) Mohamed Seguer	(Algeria) ASO Chlef	(Burkina Faso) ASFA Yennenga	4–1	2 March 2012
(Ghana) Emmanuel Clottey	(Ghana) Berekum Chelsea	(Morocco) Raja CA	5–0	25 March 2012
(Democratic Republic of the Congo) Trésor Mputu	(Democratic Republic of the Congo) TP Mazembe	(Zambia) Power Dynamos	6–0	8 April 2012
(Egypt) Mohamed Aboutrika	(Egypt) Al-Ahly	(Mali) Stade Malien	3–1	11 May 2012
(Ghana) Emmanuel Clottey	(Ghana) Berekum Chelsea	(Egypt) Zamalek	3–2	7 July 2012
(Zimbabwe) Takesure Chinyama^{4}	(South Africa) Orlando Pirates	(Comoros) Djabal Club	5–0	16 February 2013
(Ivory Coast) Mamadou Soro Nanga^{5}	(Ivory Coast) AFAD Djékanou	(Sierra Leone) Diamond Stars	5–1	17 February 2013
(Ivory Coast) Kévin Zougoula	(Ivory Coast) Séwé Sport	(Angola) Recreativo do Libolo	3–1	3 August 2013
(Morocco) Mouhcine Iajour^{4}	(Morocco) Raja CA	(Sierra Leone) Diamond Stars	6–0	7 February 2014
(Tanzania) Mrisho Ngasa	(Tanzania) Young Africans	(Comoros) Komorozine	7–0	8 February 2014
(Tanzania) Mrisho Ngasa	(Tanzania) Young Africans	(Comoros) Komorozine	5–2	15 February 2014
(Zambia) Simon Bwalya	(Zambia) Nkana	(Eswatini) Mbabane Swallows	5–2	15 February 2014
(Tunisia) Haythem Jouini	(Tunisia) Espérance de Tunis	(Kenya) Gor Mahia	5–0	16 February 2014
(Mali) Lamine Diawara	(Mali) Stade Malien	(São Tomé and Príncipe) Sporting Praia Cruz	5–0	16 February 2014
(Zimbabwe) Knowledge Musona	(South Africa) Kaizer Chiefs	(Mozambique) Liga Muçulmana	3–0	8 March 2014
(Morocco) Mouhcine Iajour	(Morocco) Moghreb Tétouan	(Nigeria) Kano Pillars	4–0	21 March 2015
(Tanzania) Mbwana Samatta	(Democratic Republic of the Congo) TP Mazembe	(Morocco) Moghreb Tétouan	5–0	12 September 2015
(Brazil) Luiz Phellype	(Angola) Recreativo do Libolo	(Equatorial Guinea) Racing de Micomeseng	5–1	13 February 2016
(Rwanda) Abdul Rwatubyaye	(Rwanda) APR	(Eswatini) Mbabane Swallows	4–1	27 February 2016
(Central African Republic) Eudes Dagoulou	(Algeria) ES Sétif	(Republic of the Congo) Étoile du Congo	4–2	20 March 2016
(Nigeria) Mfon Udoh	(Nigeria) Enyimba	(Tunisia) Étoile du Sahel	3–0	10 April 2016
(Sudan) Bakri Al-Madina	(Sudan) Al-Merrikh	(Nigeria) Rivers United	4–0	18 March 2017
(Morocco) Walid Azaro	(Egypt) Al-Ahly	(Tunisia) Étoile du Sahel	6–2	22 October 2017
(Morocco) Hamid Ahaddad^{5}	(Morocco) Difaâ El Jadidi	(Guinea-Bissau) Sport Bissau e Benfica	10–0	10 February 2018
(Tanzania) Simon Msuva	(Morocco) Difaâ El Jadidi	(Guinea-Bissau) Sport Bissau e Benfica	10–0	10 February 2018
(Algeria) Zakaria Haddouche	(Algeria) ES Sétif	(Central African Republic) Olympic Real de Bangui	6–0	11 February 2018
(Ghana) Zikiru Adams^{4}	(Zambia) ZESCO United	(Zanzibar) JKU	7–0	21 February 2018
(Algeria) Hichem Nekkache^{4}	(Algeria) MC Alger	(Republic of the Congo) AS Otôho	9–0	21 February 2018
(Zambia) Lazarous Kambole	(Zambia) ZESCO United	(Eswatini) Mbabane Swallows	3–0	18 August 2018
(Egypt) Hussein El Shahat	(Egypt) Al-Ahly	(South Sudan) Atlabara	9–0	23 August 2019
(Algeria) Karim Aribi^{4}	(Tunisia) Étoile du Sahel	(Guinea) Hafia	7–1	24 August 2019
(Zimbabwe) Rodwell Chinyengetere	(Zimbabwe) FC Platinum	(Mozambique) UD Songo	4–2	28 September 2019
(Morocco) Ayoub El Kaabi	(Morocco) Wydad AC	(Angola) Petro de Luanda	4–1	28 December 2019
(Tunisia) Firas Chaouat	(Tunisia) CS Sfaxien	(Zanzibar) Mlandege FC	5–0	28 November 2020
(Sudan) Malik	(Sudan) Al-Merrikh	(Nigeria) Enyimba F.C.	3–0	23 December 2020
(Algeria) Amir Sayoud	(Algeria) CR Belouizdad	(Kenya) Gor Mahia F.C.	6–0	26 December 2020
(Tunisia) Mohamed Ali Ben Romdhane	(Tunisia) Espérance Sportive de Tunis	(Botswana) Jwaneng Galaxy F.C.	4–0	12 February 2022
(Democratic Republic of the Congo) Fiston Mayele	(Tanzania) Young Africans S.C.	(South Sudan) Zalan FC	4–0	10 September 2022
(Democratic Republic of the Congo) Fiston Mayele	(Tanzania) Young Africans S.C.	(South Sudan) Zalan FC	5–0	17 September 2022
(South Africa) Cassius Mailula	(South Africa) Mamelodi Sundowns F.C.	(Seychelles) La Passe FC	8–1	14 October 2022
(Egypt) Ahmed Sayed	(Egypt) Zamalek SC	(Burundi) Flambeau du Centre	5–1	14 October 2022
(Egypt) Mahmoud Kahraba	(Egypt) Al Ahly SC	(Cameroon) Coton Sport	4–0	17 March 2023
(Tanzania) Clatous Chama	(Tanzania) Simba S.C.	(Guinea) Horoya AC	7–0	18 March 2023
(Egypt) Nasser Mansi	(Egypt) Zamalek SC	(Sudan) Al-Merrikh SC	4–3	31 March 2023
(Palestine) Wessam Abou Ali	(Egypt) Al Ahly SC	(Algeria) CR Belouizdad	6–1	22 December 2024
(Egypt) Emam Ashour	(Egypt) Al Ahly SC	(Ivory Coast) Stade d'Abidjan	3–1	11 January 2025
(Tunisia) Achref Jebri	(Tunisia) Espérance de Tunis	(Angola) Sagrada Esperança	4–1	18 January 2025
(Egypt) Abdallah El Said	(Egypt) Zamelak Sc	(Djibouti) AS Port	4-0	12 September 2026

- ^{4} Player scored 4 goals
- ^{5} Player scored 5 goals

== Managers ==
=== Multiple winners ===
#	Nat	Name	Titles	Years	Teams
1	Portugal	Manuel José	4	2001; 2005; 2006; 2008	(Egypt) Al-Ahly
2	South Africa	Pitso Mosimane	3	2016; 2020; 2021	(South Africa) Mamelodi Sundowns (Egypt) Al Ahly
3	Switzerland	Marcel Koller	2	2023; 2024	(Egypt) Al Ahly
3	Tunisia	Mouin Chaâbani	2	2018; 2019	(Tunisia) Espérance de Tunis
3	Argentina	Oscar Fulloné	2	1998; 1999	(Ivory Coast) ASEC Mimosas (Morocco) Raja Casablanca
3	Egypt	Mahmoud El-Gohary	2	1982; 1993	(Egypt) Al Ahly SC (Egypt) Zamalek SC
3	Poland	Stefan Żywotko	2	1981; 1990	(Algeria) JS Kabylie
3	Guinea	Boubacar Fofana	2	1975; 1977	(Guinea) Hafia Conakry
3	DR Congo	Célestin Tambwe Laye	2	1966; 1967	(Democratic Republic of the Congo) TP Mazembe
