= Football in Eritrea =

General summary of the popular sport in Eritrea

- Governing body: Eritrean National Football Federation
- National team: national football team

Club competitions
- Eritrean Premier League

International competitions
- Champions League; CAF Confederation Cup; Super Cup; FIFA Club World Cup; FIFA World Cup(National Team); African Cup of Nations(National Team)

Football is the most popular sport in Eritrea. After being under Ethiopian control, Eritrea gained its independence in 1991 and in 1998 the country became a member of FIFA.

== History ==
The football in Eritrea was started during colonial times in Italian Asmara, when the Italians ruled the country. The first championship (amateur) was in 1936: the most important teams were "Gruppo Sportivo Cicero" (later Asmara Calcio and in the late 1940s renamed "GS Asmara"), "Gruppo Rionale Neghelli", "GS Zuco", "GS Melotti", "GS Ferrovieri", "GS Marina' and the "GS Decamerè". In December 1936 the first six indigenous Eritrean teams started to compete in their own league (separate from the Italian league) and the best 3 native clubs (all having Italian names) were: "Ardita", "Savoia", "Vittoria".

The second championship was done in 1937 and was directly affiliated to the Italian Football Championship, as serie "D" or fourth level. It was divided in "Direttori" and Eritrea was the Direttorio XXIII Zona (Eritrea). The teams in the first Eritrean "Divisione" were:

- G.S. 175ª Compagnia Radio Genio, Asmara
- Dop. Ala Littoria
- Amba Galliano
- S.S. Asmara, Asmara
- G.A. Cicero
- Dop. Decameré
- G.S. Deposito Territoriale, Asmara
- Dop. Coloniale Eritreo Duca di Bergamo, Asmara
- Dopolavoro Ferroviario
- Gioventu Universitaria Fascista
- Dopolavoro O.C.R.A.E.
- Dop. Postelegrafonico, Asmara

The 1937 teams in the second Eritrean "Divisione" (amateur) were: G.S. 175ª Compagnia Radio Genio (B), Asmara; Aerobase; G.S. Capronia; Dopolavoro Gondrand and Zuco.

The first football stadium was built in 1938 Asmara during the Italian colonial period by the Italian businessman Francesco Cicero and since then it is called Cicero Stadium. It was later used by the GS Asmara, the team winner of the first professional football championships in Eritrea with the Asmara-born Luciano Vassalo.

For the first time ever, an indigenous club, "Hamasien" (formed in 1944 with the best players of the existing indigenous clubs), was admitted to the "Eritrean Calcio-Football League"; 9 years after the first local clubs were founded (Hamasien finished 2nd; 1944 champions: GS Asmara).

In the late 1940s the Asmara Calcio was renamed "GS Asmara", won the Eritrean Championship in 1945-1947-1949.

In 1950, Eritrean (local) clubs set up their own football federation, which was joined by three of the old Italian colonial clubs ("Eritrea", "GS Asmara" and "Gejeret"). The league contained about 30 clubs, divided over 3 levels ("Serie A", "Serie B" and Serie C"). In 1953, the clubs were forced to join the Ethiopian Football Association.

Between 1953 and the Eritrean full independence in 1993, Eritrean teams played in the Ethiopian Premier League, winning that league's championship 9 times. These Eritrean team champions were "Hamassien, "Akale Guzay", "Tele S.C.", "GS Asmara" and "Embassoyra":

- 1955: Hamassien (Asmara)
- 1957: Hamassien (Asmara)
- 1958: Akale Guzay (Eritrea)
- 1959: Tele S.C.(Asmara)
- 1969: Tele S.C. (Asmara)
- 1970: Tele S.C. (Asmara)
- 1972: GS Asmara (Asmara)
- 1973: GS Asmara (Asmara)
- 1974: Embassoyra (Eritrea)

Two of the most famous Eritrean footballers in Eritrean History football, Luciano Vassalo and his brother Italo, played for the Ethiopia national football team (because Eritrea was annexed to Ethiopia in those years) in the qualifying rounds for the 1962 FIFA World Cup and won the 1962 African Cup of Nations (when Ethiopia obtained their only international trophy to date).

After being under Ethiopian control, Eritrea gained its independence in 1991-1993. In 1998 the country became a member of FIFA.

Though in Eritrea Football Federation was formed in 1936, during the Italian colonialism, allowing indigenous teams to be established and run their own tournaments, it was nonetheless under the scrutiny and control of the Italians. The free and independent Football Federation was formed during the period of federation (1952-1962). After Ethiopia illegally annexed Eritrea the Football Federation had to go to back where it was during the Italian rule. Under heavy control. According to a document from the National Football Federation of Eritrea, the ENFF was re-established in 1992 following the nation’s independence and had its first statute in 1996 and was modified in 1998, totally based on the provisions of international standard of CAF and FIFA.The Eritrean National Football Federation included six committees: Finance, Competitions, Referees, Technical, Women and Public Relations.Eritrea Ministry of Information

Since 1996 the Eritrean National Football Federation organizes the Eritrean Premier League and the Eritrea national football team. Most of the Eritrean Championships have been won by Red Sea FC (12 times) and by Adulis Club (3 times).

In recent years -because of dire economic and socio-political reasons- there have been many refugees leaving Eritrea and some football athletes travelling to competitions abroad have taken the opportunity to abscond. Indeed nine players and the national Eritrean team's coach disappeared in Kenya in December 2013.

Furthermore, in 2018 World Cup qualification 10 players from the Eritrean football team have refused to return home after playing a World Cup qualifying match in Botswana and have been granted asylum there.

== List of champions in Eritrean football ==
- 1995: Red Sea FC (Asmara)
- 1996: Adulis Club (Asmara)
- 1997: FC Al Tahrir (Asmara)
- 1998: Red Sea FC (Asmara)
- 1999: Red Sea FC (Asmara)
- 2000: Red Sea FC (Asmara)
- 2001: Hintsa FC (Asmara)
- 2002: Red Sea FC (Asmara)
- 2003: Anseba S.C. (Keren)
- 2004: Adulis Club (Asmara)
- 2005: Red Sea FC (Asmara)
- 2006: Adulis Club (Asmara)
- 2007: FC Al Tahrir (Asmara)
- 2008: Asmara Brewery
- 2009: Red Sea FC (Asmara)
- 2010: Red Sea FC (Asmara)
- 2011: Red Sea FC (Asmara)
- 2012: Red Sea FC (Asmara)
- 2013: Red Sea FC (Asmara)
- 2014: Red Sea FC (Asmara)

In 2015 and 2016 the Eritrean championship has not been done for various reasons.

== Other clubs ==
- Adulis FC
- Al Tahrir FC
- Denden FC
- Asmara Birra FC
- Mai Temenai FC
- Geza banda FC
- City Center FC
- Edaga Hamus FC
- Gejeret FC
- Sembel FC
- Segen Construction FC
- Paradizo FC
- Akria FC
- Red Sea FC
- Mereb FC
- Dekemhare FC
- Sluma FC
- Barka FC
- Cemento FC
- Dankalia FC
- Mai Adkemom FC

== Football stadiums in Eritrea ==
Stadium	Capacity	City	Tenants	Image
Cicero Stadium	6,000	Asmara	Eritrea national football team, Red Sea FC	
Joko Keren Stadium	5,000	Keren		

== See also ==
- Eritrean Premier League
- Cicero Stadium
- GS Asmara
- Lists of stadiums
