= 2019 Eritrean Premier League =

Eritrean Premier League
- Season: 2019
- Champions: Red Sea FC

The 2019 Eritrean Premier League was the 2019 season of the Eritrean Premier League, the top-level football championship of Eritrea.

A total of 10 teams played in the Division A, also known as the Eritrea Superdivision Zoba Meakel (central region). The title was won by Red Sea FC. Most games took place at the 6,000-capacity Cicero Stadium.

== Standings ==
The final 2019 Eritrean Premier League standings:

#	Football club	Pts	Extra
1	Red Sea FC	28	Champions
2	Denden FC	20	
3	Al-Tahrir	19	
4	Asmara Brewery FC	19	
5	Sembel Construction	18	
6	Segen Construction	14	
7	Adulis Club	13	
8	Geza-Banda	4	
9	Paradiso FC	3	
10	Akria	2	
