= 1959 African Cup of Nations squads =

Below is a list of national squads who played in the 1959 African Cup of Nations.

== Egypt ==
Coach: (Hungary) Pál Titkos

No.	Pos.	Player	Date of birth (age)	Caps	Goals	Club
	GK	Adel Hekal	23 March 1934 (aged 25)			(Egyptian Football Association) Al-Ahly
	GK	Abdel Galil Hemaida	28 December 1923 (aged 35)			(Egyptian Football Association) Al-Ahly
	DF	Tariq Selim	15 July 1937 (aged 21)			(Egyptian Football Association) Al-Ahly
	DF	Yakan Hussein	12 September 1934 (aged 24)			(Egyptian Football Association) Zamalek
	DF	Mimi El-Sherbini	26 July 1937 (aged 21)			(Egyptian Football Association) Al-Ahly
	MF	Gomaa Farag				(Egyptian Football Association) Zamalek
	MF	Saleh Selim (captain)	11 September 1930 (aged 28)			(Egyptian Football Association) Al-Ahly
	MF	Rifaat El-Fanagily	1 May 1936 (aged 23)			(Egyptian Football Association) Al-Ahly
	MF	Mahmoud El-Shaghby				(Egyptian Football Association) Tersana
	MF	Mohei Sharshar				(Egyptian Football Association) Tersana
	FW	Essam Baheeg	26 February 1931 (aged 28)			(Egyptian Football Association) Zamalek
	FW	Mahmoud El-Gohary	20 February 1938 (aged 21)			(Egyptian Football Association) Al-Ahly
	FW	Sharif El-Far	5 January 1929 (aged 30)			(Egyptian Football Association) Zamalek
	FW	Taha Ismail	8 February 1939 (aged 20)			(Egyptian Football Association) Al-Ahly
	FW	Alaa El-Hamouly	4 July 1930 (aged 28)			(Egyptian Football Association) Zamalek

== Ethiopia ==
Coach: (Czechoslovakia) Jiří Starosta

No.	Pos.	Player	Date of birth (age)	Caps	Goals	Club
	GK	Gila-Michael Tekle Mariam	1936			(Ethiopian Football Federation) Adulis Club
	GK	Damte Haile				(Ethiopian Football Federation) Saint George SC
	GK	Senaye Hapte Gebril				(Ethiopian Football Federation) Ethiopian Air Force FC
	DF	Amanuel Kidanemariam				(Ethiopian Football Federation) GS Hamasien
	DF	Awad Mohammed				(Ethiopian Football Federation) Omedla FC
	DF	Abdulkader Ahmed				(Ethiopian Football Federation) Gumruk
	DF	Girmay Fikremariam				(Ethiopian Football Federation) GS Hamasien
	DF	Abera "Goraw" Woldemichael				(Ethiopian Football Federation) Saint George SC
	MF	Omer Royale				(Ethiopian Football Federation) Saint George SC
	MF	Araya Kiflom				(Ethiopian Football Federation) Tele SC
	MF	Mengistu Worku	1940			(Ethiopian Football Federation) Saint George SC
	MF	Tesfaye Gebremedhin				(Ethiopian Football Federation) Tele SC
	MF	Samuel Zewde				(Ethiopian Football Federation) Saint George SC
	MF	Kebede Metaferia				(Ethiopian Football Federation) Mechal SC
	MF	Yonas Berhane				(Ethiopian Football Federation) Mechal SC
	MF	Nassir Berhe				(Ethiopian Football Federation) Omedla FC
	MF	Mekouria Tadesse				(Ethiopian Football Federation) Mekuria
	FW	Asrat Hailemariam				(Ethiopian Football Federation) Mechal SC
	FW	Girmay Tessema				(Ethiopian Football Federation) Tele SC
	FW	Tessaw Gebrewolde				(Ethiopian Football Federation) Mechal SC
	FW	Abraha Bayrou				(Ethiopian Football Federation) Omedla FC
	FW	Ayele Tessema				(Ethiopian Football Federation) Mechal SC

== Sudan ==
Coach: (Hungary) József Háda

No.	Pos.	Player	Date of birth (age)	Caps	Goals	Club
	GK	Sabit Dudu	1930			(Sudan Football Association) Al-Hilal Club
	GK	Samir Muhamed Ali				(Sudan Football Association) Al Ahli SC (Khartoum)
	DF	Mansour Ramadan				(Sudan Football Association) Al-Merreikh SC
	DF	Ebrahim Kabir				(Sudan Football Association) Al Ahli SC (Khartoum)
	DF	Hassan Alabd				(Sudan Football Association) Al-Merreikh SC
	DF	Osman Al-Deim (captain)				(Sudan Football Association) Al-Hilal Club
	DF	Mutwakel Muhamed Albashir				(Sudan Football Association) Al-Hilal SC
	DF	Hassan Altayeb				(Sudan Football Association) Al-Ittihad SC (Bahri)
	MF	Suliman Dafaallah Al-Mehina				(Sudan Football Association) Al-Mourada SC
	MF	Alhadi Seyam				(Sudan Football Association) Al-Hilal Club
	FW	Mahmoud Alzubir				(Sudan Football Association) Al-Mourada SC
	MF	Osman Abdellatif				(Sudan Football Association) Al-Tahrir SC (Bahri)
	MF	Ahmed Jadin				(Sudan Football Association) Obeid Club
	MF	Hamed Ibrahim Kamel				(Sudan Football Association) Alamal SC Atbara
	MF	Boraî Bashir	1932			(Sudan Football Association) Al-Merreikh SC
	FW	Siddiq Manzul	1929			(Sudan Football Association) Al-Hilal Club
	FW	Abdelmutaleb Naser Dareesa				(Sudan Football Association) Al-Hilal Club
	FW	Omer Altoum				(Sudan Football Association) Al-Mourada SC
	FW	Abdullah Ohaj				(Sudan Football Association) Al-Ittihad SC (Port Sudan)
