= FC Haben =

Haben
- Full name: FC Haben
- Ground: Haben Stadium; Asmara, Eritrea
- League: Eritrean League

Haben is an Eritrean football club (as of 2001) based in Asmara.

== Current squad ==
Note: Flags indicate national team as defined under FIFA eligibility rules; some limited exceptions apply. Players may hold more than one non-FIFA nationality.

No.	Pos.	Nation	Player
—	GK	ERI	Negassi Leake
—	GK	ERI	Goitom Hagos
—	DF	ERI	Almaz Zerai
—	DF	ERI	Kibreab Asrat
—	DF	ERI	Bereket Sibhatu
—	DF	ERI	Haile Ghirmazion
—	DF	ERI	Semere
—	DF	ERI	Zemichael Ogbe
—	DF	ERI	Tsigereda Gebrehiwet
—	DF	ERI	Tesfagabir Haile
—	MF	ERI	Birhane Kidane

No.	Pos.	Nation	Player
—	MF	ERI	Abraham Tecle
—	MF	ERI	Habtom Ghbrezgiher
—	MF	ERI	Haregu Mehari
—	MF	ERI	Elsa Aklilu
—	MF	ERI	Kahsay Fessehazion
—	MF	ERI	Tedros Ghebrat
—	FW	ERI	Kibreab Fre
—	FW	ERI	Habtesillassie Zerzghi
—	FW	ERI	Kibreab Belay
—	FW	ERI	Worku Balcha
—	FW	ERI	Ghennet Meresae

== See also ==
- Football in Eritrea
