= Yonas Solomon =

Eritrean footballer

Personal information
- Full name: Yonas Solomon Kudus
- Date of birth: 21 June 1994 (age 32)
- Place of birth: Barentu, Eritrea
- Height: 1.76 m (5 ft 9 1/2 in)
- Position: Defender

Senior career*
Years	Team	Apps	(Gls)
2013–2016	Adulis Club		
2016–2017	Al-Ahli Club		
2017–2021	Al Khartoum SC		
2021–2022	Tuti SC		
2022–	Al-Shorta SC (Al-Qadaref)		

International career^{‡}
2013–	Eritrea	7	(0)
- * Club domestic league appearances and goals ‡ National team caps and goals as of 22:59, 30 January 2022 (UTC)

Yonas Solomon (born 21 June 1994) is an Eritrean footballer who plays for Al Khartoum SC of the Sudan Premier League, and the Eritrea national team.

== Club career ==
Solomon started his professional career with Adulis Club of the Eritrean Premier League from 2013 to 2016. He then transferred to Al-Ahli Club (Atbara) of the Sudan Premier League until 2017. He then joined fellow-Sudanese side Al Khartoum SC. As of 2015 he was one of only two Eritreans playing in Sudan, along with Samyoma Alexander.

== International career ==
Yonas made his senior international debut on 29 November 2013 in a 2013 CECAFA Cup match against Sudan. He went on to represent the nation in its 2018 FIFA World Cup qualification series against Botswana.

=== International career statistics ===
As of match played 25 January 2020.

Eritrea national team
Year	Apps	Goals
2013	3	0
2014	0	0
2015	2	0
2016	0	0
2017	0	0
2018	0	0
2019	2	0
2020	0	0
2021	0	0
2022	0	0
Total	7	0
