= Deven Gibxawi =

Eritrean footballer

Personal information
- Full name: Deven Gibxawi Hintseab
- Date of birth: 3 September 2000 (age 26)
- Place of birth: Asmara, Eritrea
- Height: 1.76 m (5 ft 9 1/2 in)
- Position: Striker

Team information
- Current team: Red Sea

Senior career*
Years	Team	Apps	(Gls)
2019–	Red Sea		

International career^{‡}
2019–	Eritrea	7	(0)
- * Club domestic league appearances and goals ‡ National team caps and goals as of 14:04, 27 September 2021 (UTC)

Deven Gibxawi (born 3 September 2000) is an Eritrean footballer who plays for Eritrean Premier League club Red Sea FC and the Eritrea national team.

== International career ==
Gibxawi made his senior international debut on 9 December 2019 in a 2019 CECAFA Cup match against Burundi.

=== International career statistics ===
As of match played 25 January 2020.

Eritrea national team
Year	Apps	Goals
2019	6	0
2020	1	0
2021	1	0
Total	7	0
