= CH-Star =

Association football club in Eritrea

C.H. Star
- Full name: C.H. Star
- Ground: Cicero Stadium; Asmara, Eritrea
- Capacity: 10,000
- League: Eritrean League

C.H. Star is an Eritrean football club (as of 2001) based in Asmara.

== Current squad ==
Note: Flags indicate national team as defined under FIFA eligibility rules; some limited exceptions apply. Players may hold more than one non-FIFA nationality.

No.	Pos.	Nation	Player
—	GK	ERI	Vamn Firgsi
—	GK	ERI	Hail Goitom
—	DF	ERI	Ben Muhammed
—	DF	ERI	Tenese Goi
—	DF	ERI	Kimbai Suleman
—	DF	ERI	Abdulai Kibrom
—	DF	ERI	Cegi Jonathan
—	DF	ERI	Muric Jacop
—	DF	ERI	Toni Adema
—	DF	ERI	Birhanu Bati
—	MF	ERI	Ali Abdela Sevaie
—	MF	ERI	Verknes Wretene

No.	Pos.	Nation	Player
—	MF	ERI	Belete Jakop
—	MF	ERI	Kef-Ale Tefera
—	MF	ERI	Mammo Urgeco
—	MF	ERI	Sebsibe Geberhana
—	MF	ERI	Gezakhne Bogale
—	FW	ERI	Maskereh Tsiemdambinda
—	FW	ERI	Terekengh Geleta
—	FW	ERI	Aster Rodni
—	FW	ERI	Kef-Ale Assa
—	FW	ERI	Mohammed Kadebe
