= Gunnar Norebø =

Norwegian footballer (born 1976)

Personal information
- Date of birth: 28 January 1976 (age 50)
- Height: 1.73 m (5 ft 8 in)
- Position: Midfielder

Youth career
- Austrheim

Senior career*
Years	Team	Apps	(Gls)
1993–1998	Brann		
1998	→ VPS Vaasa (loan)		
1999–2004	Åsane		
2004–2005	Tesfa FC		
2005	Åsane		
2006–2009	Lørenskog		

Managerial career
- 2006–2008: Lørenskog (playing assistant coach)
- * Club domestic league appearances and goals

Gunnar Norebø (born 28 January 1976) is a Norwegian retired football midfielder.

He is from Austrheim Municipality. He was regarded as a fine talent in his early days and trained with AFC Ajax. He made his debut for the Norwegian Premier League team SK Brann in 1993, and played there until 1998. He spent some time on loan at VPS Vaasa in his last year at Brann. Released by Brann, in early 1999, he negotiated a contract with the Greek team Ionikos, but contract irregularities led to Norebø dropping the club. He instead joined Åsane. At the same time, he studied at the Norwegian School of Sport Sciences and, in August 2004, he was hired by Norsk Folkehjelp for a project in Eritrea. His job was to play, coach and develop players in the first-tier football club Tesfa FC. He returned to Åsane after one year.

In 2006, he was hired by Lørenskog IF as a playing assistant coach. He still played there in 2008.
