= Asmara Brewery =

Nationalized brewery in Asmara, Eritrea

- Location: Asmara, Eritrea
- Opened: 1939 (as Melotti Brewery)
- Annual production volume: 400,000
- Owner: Asmara Brewery Corporation

Active beers
Name	Type
Asmara Lager Beer	Lager
Asmara Extra Stout	Stout

Asmara Brewery (formerly Melotti Brewery) is a brewery in Eritrea. The brewery was founded in 1938. The brewery was nationalized by the Derg during the Eritrean War of Independence. The brewery operates a football team, which plays in the Eritrean Premier League. The factory has over 600 employees.

== History ==
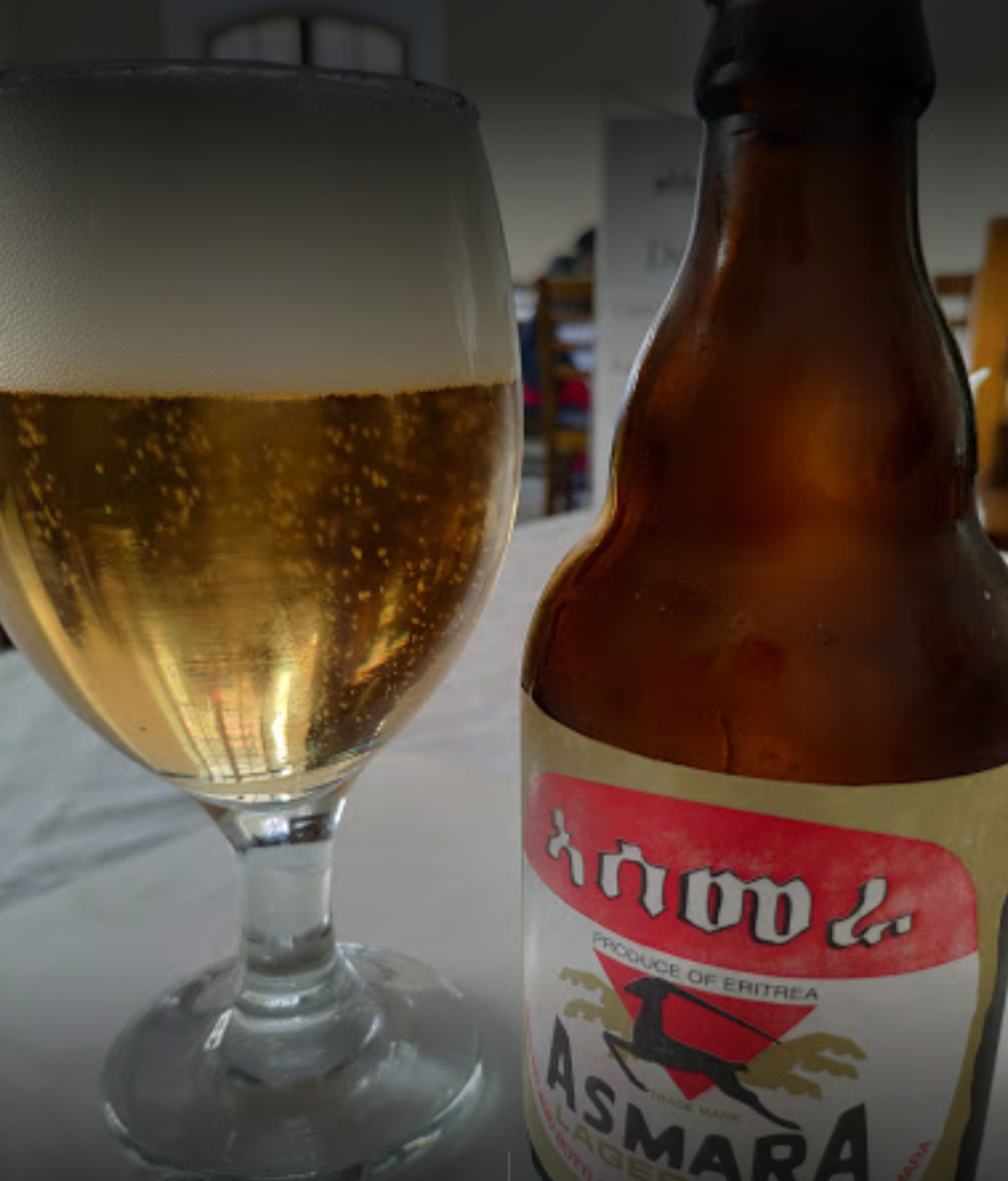
Asmara beer

The brewery was founded in 1938 by Italian engineer Luigi Melotti. It started production in 1939.

Asmara Brewery was originally established in 1939 in Asmara, where it is presently located. The Present site of the factory was previously used as a depot of road construction materials. It was set up by Eng. Luigi Melotti, an Italian National who came to Eritrea during the Italian colonial period, as an expert in road construction. The factory, to start with, used to produce liquor products based on rudimentary technology. Asmara Brewery Corporation S.C. was originally established during the Italian colonial period, to start with, to produce alcoholic drinks (liquor) on a small scale. Over the years, the Brewery went through major developments, in terms of product quality improvement, diversification and plant capacity expansion and modernization, to become a highly reputed plant of its kind.

The brewery was nationalized by the Derg during the Eritrean War of Independence, and was then inherited by the Government of Eritrea. Ownership in the brewery is shared between investors and the Government of Eritrea. In 1998, its factory exported up to 40% of production, with the remainder being domestically consumed. Production was affected during 2000 and production decreased for a period of time. However the production has since got back to normal levels, now even exporting products internationally to countries worldwide. During WW2 and the present day it is one of the biggest companies in Eritrea. Melotti, the wealthy original owner, also built the famous "Villa Melotti" on the southern tip of Taulud Island in Massawa.

== Overview ==
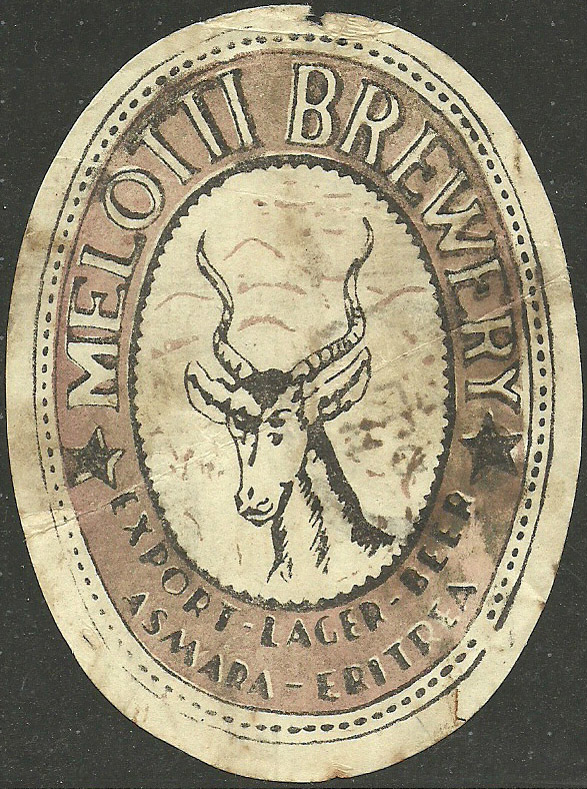
Melotti beer label, 1945

The Asmara Brewery plant covers an area of 100,000 square metres, 25,000 of which are covered by modern and functional buildings. The industrial activity includes the distillery, the liquor factory, the brewery, and the glass factory.

=== Distillery ===
The distillery consists of a modern installation for the production of alcohol from musts of dense wines, as this activity was installed for the industrial exploitation of the fruit of the doum palm. The distillery installation has a daily production capability of 24 hectolitres of denatured alcohol exceeding 96o.

=== Liquor factory ===
Production capability is about 50,000 bottles monthly. The most popular liquors are anise, cognac, fernet, gin, and zibib.

=== Brewery ===
The brewery exports canned beer. The annual production capability exceeds 100,000,000 bottles a year.

=== Glass factory ===
The glass factory started its own production in January 1960 with new facilities built in 1959, allowing for production which extends from the 90 gr bottle to the 1000 gr bottle and to a vast range of glasses, which meet demand in all local markets.

== Brewery products ==
The brewery produces a wide range of beverages. One of its best known is Ariki, an aniseed-flavored spirit. It also produces its Asmara beer (lager) and other beverages susch as gin, cognac and Fernet-Branca.

== Football team ==
The brewery operates a football team, which plays in the Eritrean Premier League since the 1990s. The team was initially founded in 1944 with the name Asmara Birra by the engineer Melotti (he had already founded in 1938 the GS Melotti team.)

== See also ==
- Asmara Birra FC
