= Mdlaw Megbi =

Eritrean football club

- Full name: Mdlaw Megbi
- Ground: Cicero Stadium; Asmara, Eritrea
- Capacity: 10,000
Home colours	Away colours

Mdlaw Megbi is an Eritrean football club based in Asmara.

== Performance in CAF competitions ==
- CAF Champions League: 1

1998 – Preliminary Round
