= Eritrean Cup =

Annual association football tournament in Eritrea

The Eritrean Cup is the top knockout football tournament in Eritrea.

== Winners ==
Note: Only known winners are listed.

- 2009: Denden (beat Tesfa 2–1 in final)
- 2011: Maitemanai
- 2013: Maitemanai
