= 2011 Kagame Interclub Cup =

CECAFA Club Cup

Tournament details
- Host country: Tanzania
- City: Dar es Salaam
- Dates: 25 June - 10 July 2011
- Teams: 13 (from 11 associations)
- Venues: 3 (in 2 host cities)
- All statistics correct as of 30 June 2011.

The CECAFA organised Kagame Interclub Cup is an association football competition that is contested between the champions of the CECAFA affiliated countries plus one guest team.

The 2011 contest took place between 25 June and 10 July 2011. The Tournament was originally scheduled to be held in Zanzibar, however the Zanzibarian authorities did not have the necessary logistics to host the event and it was handed to Sudan then Tanzania.

== Participants ==
Group A

- (Rwanda) Etincelles FC
- (Eritrea) Red Sea F.C.
- (Tanzania) Simba SC
- (Burundi) Vital'O F.C.
- Zanzibar Ocean View

Group B

- (Sudan) Al-Merreikh
- (Uganda) Bunamwaya SC
- (Somalia) Elman FC
- (Tanzania) Young Africans FC

Group C

- (Rwanda) APR FC
- (Djibouti) Ports
- (Ethiopia) Saint-George SA
- (Kenya) Ulinzi Stars

== Group stage ==
=== Group A ===
Team	Pld	W	D	L	GF	GA	GD	Pts
(Tanzania) Simba SC	4	2	2	0	3	0	+3	8
(Eritrea) Red Sea F.C.	4	2	1	1	5	3	+2	7
(Burundi) Vital'O F.C.	4	2	1	1	4	2	+2	7
Zanzibar Ocean View	4	2	0	2	5	4	+1	6
(Rwanda) Etincelles FC	4	0	0	4	4	12	−8	0

25 June 2011
11:00

Simba SC	0–0	Vital'O

25 June 2011
13:00

Etincelles	2–3	Ocean View

Referee: Wiish Yabarow (Somalia)

27 June 2011

Ocean View	2–0	Red Sea

27 June 2011

Etincelles	1–3	Vital'O

29 June 2011

Ocean View	0–1	Simba SC

29 June 2011

Red Sea	4–1	Entincelles

1 July 2011

Etincelles	0–2	Simba SC

1 July 2011

Vital'O	0–1	Red Sea

3 July 2011

Simba SC	0–0	Red Sea

3 July 2011

Ocean View	0–1	Vital'O

=== Group B ===
Team	Pld	W	D	L	GF	GA	GD	Pts
(Tanzania) Young Africans FC	3	2	1	0	7	4	+3	7
(Sudan) Al-Merreikh	3	1	2	0	6	3	+3	5
(Uganda) Bunamwaya SC	3	1	1	1	7	4	+3	4
(Somalia) Elman FC	3	0	0	3	0	9	−9	0

26 June 2011
13:00

Young Africans	2–2	Al-Merreikh

28 June 2011

Bunamwaya SC	4–0	Elman

30 June 2011
11:00

Al-Merreikh	1–1	Bunamwaya SC

Referee: Wiish Yabarow (Somalia)
30 June 2011
13:00

Elman	0–2	Young Africans

2 July 2011
11:00

Al-Merreikh	3–0	Elman

2 July 2011
13:00

Bunamwaya SC	2–3	Young Africans

=== Group C ===
Team	Pld	W	D	L	GF	GA	GD	Pts
(Ethiopia) Saint-George SA	3	2	1	0	11	2	+9	7
(Kenya) Ulinzi Stars	3	1	2	0	10	1	+9	5
(Rwanda) APR FC	3	1	1	1	5	3	+2	4
(Djibouti) Ports	3	0	0	3	0	20	−20	0

26 June 2011
11:00

APR FC	4–0	Ports

28 June 2011

Ulinzi Stars	1–1	St. Georges

30 June 2011

APR FC	1–3	St. Georges

30 June 2011

Ports	0–9	Ulinzi Stars

2 July 2011

Ulinzi Stars	0–0	APR FC

2 July 2011

St. Georges	7–0	Ports

=== Ranking of third-placed teams ===
At the end of the first stage, a comparison was made between the third-placed teams of each group. The two best third-placed teams advanced to the quarterfinals.

Grp	Team	Pld	W	D	L	GF	GA	GD	Pts
A	(Burundi) Vital'O F.C.	4	2	1	1	4	2	+2	7
B	(Uganda) Bunamwaya SC	3	1	1	1	7	4	+3	4
C	(Rwanda) APR FC	3	1	1	1	5	3	+2	4

== Knockout stage ==
All times are East Africa Time (UTC+3)

Quarter-finals
5 July
Al-Merreikh	1 (9)
Ulinzi Stars	1 (8)
5 July
Simba SC	2
Bunamwaya SC	1
6 July
Young Africans FC	0 (6)
Red Sea F.C.	0 (5)
6 July
Saint-George SA	2
Vital'O	0

Semi-finals
7 July
Al-Merreikh	1 (4)
Simba SC	1 (5)
8 July
Young Africans FC	0 (5)
Saint-George SA	0 (4)

Final
10 July
Simba SC	0
Young Africans FC	1
Third place
10 July
Al-Merreikh	2
Saint-George SA	0

Kagame Inter-Club Cup
2011 winners
