= Tesfa FC =

Association football club in Eritrea

Tesfa
- Full name: Tesfa FC
- Founded: 1994
- Ground: Cicero Stadium; Asmara, Eritrea
- Capacity: 10,000
- Chairman: Asmerom Ghirmay
- Manager: Mekonnen Zewde
- League: Eritrean Premier League

Tesfa FC is an Eritrean football club based in Asmara.

The team was founded in 1994 and currently plays in Eritrean Premier League.

== Stadium ==
Currently the team plays at the 10000 capacity Cicero Stadium. The team's current manager is Mekonnen Zewede.
