= 1974 African Cup of Champions Clubs =

2022

Tournament details
- Dates: April - 13 December 1974
- Teams: 26 (from 1 confederation)

Final positions
- Champions: (Republic of the Congo) CARA Brazzaville (1st title)
- Runners-up: (Egypt) Ghazl El Mahalla

Tournament statistics
- Matches played: 45
- Goals scored: 134 (2.98 per match)
- Top scorer: (Republic of the Congo) Paul Moukila (10 goals)
- Best player: (Republic of the Congo) Paul Moukila

The African Cup of Champions Clubs 1974 was the 10th edition of the annual international club football competition held in the CAF region (Africa), the African Cup of Champions Clubs. It determined that year's club champion of association football in Africa.

The tournament was played by 26 teams and used a knock-out format with ties played home and away. CARA Brazzaville from the People's Republic of the Congo won the final, becoming CAF club champion for the first time and the first team from that country to win the trophy.

== First round ==
Team 1	Agg.	Team 2	1st leg	2nd leg
Al-Ahli Tripoli (Libya)	2–5	(Sudan) Al-Hilal	2–2	0–3
Bendel Insurance (Nigeria)	7–1	(Niger) Secteur 7	7–0	0–1
CARA Brazzaville (Republic of the Congo)	7–1	(Gabon) Zalang COC	3–1	4–0
Green Buffaloes (Zambia)	6–2	(Madagascar) JS Antalaha	4–1	2–1
Linare FC (Lesotho)	3-6	(Tanzania) Simba SC	0–3	6–0
Mighty Barolle (Liberia)	0–2	(Ivory Coast) ASEC Mimosas	0–0	0–2
CO Modèle Lomé (Togo)	3–1	(Republic of Dahomey) AS Porto Novo	3–0	0–1
Olympic Real de Bangui (Central African Republic)	4–1	(Uganda) Simba FC	4–0	0–1
Ports Authority F.C. (Sierra Leone)	4–5	(Senegal) ASC Jeanne d'Arc	3–2	1–3
Tele SC Asmara (Ethiopia)	w/o^{1}	(Somalia) Horseed FC	—	—

^{1} Horseed FC withdrew.

== Second round ==
Team 1	Agg.	Team 2	1st leg	2nd leg
ASEC Mimosas (Ivory Coast)	5–0	(Togo) CO Modèle de Lomé	3–0	2–0^{1}
Abaluhya FC (Kenya)	2–1	(Ethiopia) Tele SC Asmara	2–0	0–1
CARA Brazzaville (Republic of the Congo)	4–3	(Zaire) AS Vita Club	4–0	0–3
Djoliba AC (Mali)	2–1	(Nigeria) Bendel Insurance	2–0	0–1
Green Buffaloes (Zambia)	0-9	(Tanzania) Simba SC	0-0	0–9
Hearts of Oak (Ghana)	9–4	(Central African Republic) Olympic Real de Bangui	6–1	3–3
ASC Jeanne d'Arc (Senegal)	w/o^{2}	(Guinea) Hafia FC	—	—
Ghazl El Mahalla (Egypt)	5–5 (4–2 p)	(Sudan) Al-Hilal	4–1	1–4

^{1} Modèle Lomé flew home after the first leg and were disqualified.
^{2} Hafia FC withdrew.

== Quarter-finals ==
Team 1	Agg.	Team 2	1st leg	2nd leg
ASEC Mimosas (Ivory Coast)	2–2 (a)	(Senegal) ASC Jeanne d'Arc	2–1	0–1
Djoliba AC (Mali)	0–3	(Republic of the Congo) CARA Brazzaville	0–0	0–3
Hearts of Oak (Ghana)	1–2	(Tanzania) Simba SC	0-0	1–2
Ghazl El Mahalla (Egypt)	4–1	(Kenya) Abaluhya	3–0	1–1

== Semi-finals ==
Team 1	Agg.	Team 2	1st leg	2nd leg
CARA Brazzaville (Republic of the Congo)	6–1	(Senegal) ASC Jeanne d'Arc	2–0	4–1
Simba SC (Tanzania)	1–1 (0–3 p)	(Egypt) Ghazl El Mahalla	1–0	0–1

== Final ==
29 November 1974
--:-- UTC+1

CARA Brazzaville (Republic of the Congo)	4–2	(Egypt) Ghazl El Mahalla
Yanghat 3'; Moukila 23' (pen.); Yanghat 59'; Moukila 82'		Omasha ?'; Youssef 65' (pen.)

Stade de la Révolution, Brazzaville
Referee: (Senegal) Youssou N'Diaye
13 December 1974
--:-- UTC+2

Ghazl El Mahalla (Egypt)	1–2	(Republic of the Congo) CARA Brazzaville
Khalil 87'		Yanghat 35', ?'

Ghazl El Mahalla Stadium, El Mahalla

== Champion ==
African Cup of Champions Clubs
1974 Winners

CARA Brazzaville
First Title

== Top scorers ==
The top scorers from the 1974 African Cup of Champions Clubs are as follows:

Rank	Name	Team	Goals
1	(Republic of the Congo) Paul Moukila	(Republic of the Congo) CARA Brazzaville	10
2	(Egypt) Mohamed Omasha	(Egypt) Ghazl El Mahalla	6
3	(Egypt) Abdelrahim Khalil	(Egypt) Ghazl El Mahalla	3
4	(Republic of the Congo) Alphonse Yanghat	(Republic of the Congo) CARA Brazzaville	2
4	(Tanzania) Abdallah Kibadeni	(Tanzania) Simba SC	2
