= Tele SC =

Association football club in Eritrea

Tele SC Asmara
- Full name: Tele SC Asmara Football Club
- Founded: 1939 (as "Gejeret")
- Ground: Cicero Stadium; Asmara, Eritrea
- Capacity: 10,000
- League: Eritrean National League

Tele SC Asmara (Telecommunications Sport Club of Asmara) is an Eritrean football club based in Asmara.

== History ==
Initially the club was founded in the early 1940s as an Italo-Eritrean club named Gejeret, that played in the amateur championship of Italian Eritrea. In 1950 Gejeret started to play in the top league of Eritrea in Asmara and changed the name to "Telecommunications SC" (usually called "Tele SC").

In 1950, Eritrean (local) clubs set up their own football federation, which was joined by three of the old Italian clubs (Eritrea, Asmara and Gejeret). The league contained about 30 clubs, divided over 3 levels (Serie A, B and C). In 1953, clubs were forced to join the Ethiopian FA.

In the Ethiopian championship the team obtained prestigious levels. In 1959, the team has won the Ethiopian Premier League. The Eritrean team has also won the Ethiopian championship in 1969 and 1970.

The team merged with a historical club SC Asmara in the early 1970s and changed the club's name for a second time, it was named as Tele SC Asmara. Under the lead of Massimo Fenili the team has won two titles of the Ethiopian National Championships in 1972 and in 1973.

The team participated in four editions of the "African Cup of Champions Clubs".

Since the years of struggle for Eritrean independence, the team has entered into a deep crisis and started playing in the secondary division of Eritrea. Since 2016, it is no longer active due to financial reasons.

== Stadium ==
Currently the team plays at Cicero Stadium, created in the early 1940s. The stadium is estimated to fit 10,000 people.

== Honours ==
- Ethiopian Premier League as "Tele SC": 1959, 1969, 1970
- Ethiopian Premier League as "Tele SC Asmara": 1972 and 1973

== Performance in CAF competitions ==
- CAF Champions League: 4 appearances

1970 African Cup of Champions Clubs
1971 African Cup of Champions Clubs
1973 African Cup of Champions Clubs
1974 African Cup of Champions Clubs
