= Sabit Dudu =

Sudanese footballer (1930–2022)

Personal information
- Full name: Eid Sabbit Dudu Damor
- Date of birth: 1930
- Place of birth: Khartoum, Anglo-Egyptian Sudan
- Date of death: 28 September 2022 (aged 91–92)
- Place of death: Jeddah, Saudi Arabia
- Position: Goalkeeper

Senior career*
| Years | Team | Apps | (Gls) |
| 1950–1952 | Al-Mugren SC | | |
| 1953–1967 | Al Hilal Omdurman | | |

International career
| 1956–1967 | Sudan | | |
Medal record
Men's football
Representing Sudan
Africa Cup of Nations
| Runner-up | 1959 United Arab Republic |
| Runner-up | 1963 Ghana |
Arab Games
| Silver medal – second place | 1965 Cairo |
- * Club domestic league appearances and goals

Eid Sabbit Dudu Damor (Arabic: عيد سبت دودو دمور; 1930 – 28 September 2022), commonly known as Sabit Dudu (Arabic: سبت دودو), was a Sudanese footballer who played as a goalkeeper.

Prior to becoming a goalkeeper, Dudu began his football career as a forward. At club level, he played for Al Hilal Omdurman for 14 years between 1953 and 1967, before retiring from football due to an injury. With Sudan, Dudu was part of their teams at the 1959 and 1963 African Cup of Nations, captaining them in the 1963 final where they lost 3–0 to Ghana.

Following his retirement, he worked as a goalkeeper coach at Al-Ahli Jeddah for 23 years.

Dudu died in Jeddah on 28 September 2022.

== Honours ==
Sudan

- African Cup of Nations: runner-up, 1959, 1963
- Arab Games: Silver, 1965
