= Denden FC =

Association football club in Eritrea

Denden
- Full name: Denden Football Club
- Ground: Denden Stadium; Asmara, Eritrea
- Capacity: 20,000
- League: Eritrean Premier League

Denden FC is an Eritrean football club based in Asmara.

== Honours ==
- Eritrean Premier League: 2

2024, 2025

- Eritrean Cup: 1

2009
