= Asmara Brewery FC =

Association football club in Eritrea

Asmara Brewery
- Full name: Asmara Brewery
- Ground: Cicero Stadium; Asmara, Eritrea
- Capacity: 10,000
- League: Eritrean Premier League
Home colours	Away colours

Asmara Brewery FC or Asmara Birra is an Eritrean football club based in Asmara and founded in 1944 (with the original 1936 name GS Melotti). It is maintained by the Asmara Brewery.

== History ==
The Asmara Birra played in the Eritrean Premier League since the 1990s. The team was initially founded in 1944 by the engineer Melotti, who founded the "Asmara Brewery" under the name of GS Hamasien. He had already founded the GS Melotti, an amateur football team in Italian Asmara in 1936. In 2008, the club won the Eritrea championship.

== Achievements ==
- Ethiopian Premier League: 4

1955, 1957, 1972, 1973

- Eritrean Premier League: 1

2008

- Ethiopian Cup: 1

1970

== Performance in CAF competitions ==
- CAF Cup: 1 appearance

1998 – Preliminary round

== See also ==
- Asmara Brewery
- Football in Eritrea
