= Eritrean National Football Federation =

Governing body of association football in Eritrea

CAF
- Founded: 1996
- Headquarters: Asmara
- FIFA affiliation: 1998
- CAF affiliation: 1996 (Provisional member), 1998
- CECAFA affiliation: ?
- President: Paulos Weldehaimanot
- Website: enff-online.com

The Eritrean National Football Federation (E.N.F.F.) (Tigrinya: ሃገራዊ ፈደረሽን ኩዕሶ እግሪ ኤርትራ) is the governing body of football in Eritrea.

== History ==
The ENFF was founded in 1996 and affiliated to FIFA and the Confederation of African Football (CAF) in 1998.

It organizes the Eritrean Premier League and the Eritrea national football team.

== Logos ==
Old logo

Present logo
