= Asmara Calcio =

Association football club in Eritrea

- Full name: Gruppo Sportivo Asmara FC
- Founded: 1936
- Ground: Cicero Stadium; Asmara, Eritrea
- Capacity: 6,000
- Chairman: Francesco Cicero (1936-1945)

Asmara Calcio was the Italian Eritrea football team of Asmara (capital of Eritrea), created during colonial times.

== History ==
The Asmara Calcio (also called "Gruppo Sportivo Asmara" or GS Asmara) was created in the late 1930s, by Italian entrepreneur Cicero (who also made the Cicero Stadium) as the representative football team of the Italian colonists in Asmara.

The football in Eritrea was started during colonial times, when the Italians ruled the country. The first championship (amateur) was in 1936: the most important teams were "Gruppo Sportivo Cicero" (later Asmara Calcio), "Gruppo Rionale Neghelli", "GS Zuco", "GS Melotti", "GS Ferrovieri", "GS Marina' and the "GS Decamerè".

The team won the first Eritrean championship, done in 1940, but was not officially finished, because of the beginning of WW2. In the late 1940s the "GS Asmara" won the Eritrean Championship in 1945-1947-1949.

"GS Asmara", the mainly Italian players only team, survived until early sixties. In early sixties or sometime before, the Eritrean Football Federation was reorganized. In the reorganization process, at least three teams were dissolved and ceased to exist (GS Stella Eritrea, GS Barattolo, may be Qestedemana from police/customs); one of them was, the mostly Italian team GS Asmara. Some of the remaining teams were renamed. GS Seraie became GS Mendefera, GS Hamasien became GS Asmara, and GS Akeleguzai became GS Amabasoira.

== Bibliography ==
- "1941-1951 The difficult years" (in Italian), showing the end of Italian Eritrea with references to the Asmara Calcio team

== See also ==
- Football in Eritrea
