= Hintsa FC =

Association football club in Eritrea

Hintsa
- Full name: Hintsa
- Ground: Cicero Stadium; Asmara, Eritrea
- Capacity: 10,000
- League: Eritrean Premier League

Hintsa is a football club based in Asmara, Eritrea.

== Achievements ==
- Eritrean Premier League: 1

2001

== Performance in CAF competitions ==
- CAF Champions League: 1 appearance

2002 – Preliminary Round
