= Anseba SC =

Association football club in Eritrea

Anseba S.C.
- Full name: Anseba Sport Club
- Ground: Olympic Stadium; Keren, Eritrea
- League: Eritrean Second League

Anseba Sport Club is an Eritrean football club based in Keren, Eritrea.

== Achievements ==
- Eritrean Premier League: 1

2003

== Performance in CAF competitions ==
- CAF Champions League: 1 appearance

2004 – Preliminary Round
