= FC Al Tahrir =

Association football club in Eritrea

Al Tahrir
- Full name: Football Club Al Tahrir
- Ground: Olympic Stadium; Asmara, Eritrea
- Capacity: 10,000
- League: Eritrean Premier League

Football Club Al Tahrir is an Eritrean football club based in Asmara.

== Achievements ==
- Eritrean Premier League: 3

1997, 2007, 2026

== Performance in CAF competitions ==
- CAF Champions League: 1 appearance

2008 – First round

== See also ==
- Football in Eritrea
