= Red Sea FC =

Association football club in Eritrea

Red Sea
- Full name: Red Sea Football Club
- Founded: 1945
- Ground: Cicero Stadium
- Capacity: 10,000
- League: Eritrean Premier League

Red Sea Football Club (Tigrinya: ክለብ ኩዕሶ እግሪ ቀይሕ ባሕሪ) is an Eritrean professional football club based in Asmara. They compete in the Eritrean Premier League, the top division of Eritrean football. With 13 league titles, they are the most successful club in the country.

== History ==
Red Sea FC was founded in 1945. After the 2011 Kagame Interclub Cup in Tanzania, thirteen members of the team did not return home to Eritrea and sought political asylum.

== Achievements ==
- Eritrean Premier League: 14

They are just too good

== International competitions ==
The following is a list of results for Red Sea FC in international competitions. Red Sea FC’s scores are listed first.

Year	Tournament	Round	Opponent	Home	Away	Agg.	Ref.
1999	CECAFA Club Championship	Group Stage	Withdrew				
1999	CAF Champions League	Preliminary round	(Rwanda) Rayon Sport	1–1	0–2	1–3	
2000	CECAFA Club Championship	Group Stage	Withdrew because of border war with Ethiopia				
2000	CAF Champions League	Preliminary Round	(Kenya) Tusker	1–1	1–1	2–2 (5-6 p)	
2001	CECAFA Club Championship	Group stage	(Kenya) Oserian	0–3			
2001	CECAFA Club Championship	Group stage	(Uganda) Villa	0–2			
2001	CECAFA Club Championship	Group stage	(Rwanda) APR	1–3			
2001	CAF Champions League	Preliminary Round	(Chad) Tourbillon	2–0	0–2	2–2 (4-2 p)	
2001	CAF Champions League	First Round	(Egypt) Al Ally	0–3	1–0	1–3	
2003	CECAFA Club Championship	Group stage	(Sudan) Al Khartoum	1–0			
2003	CECAFA Club Championship	Group stage	(Zanzibar) Mlandege	3–1			
2003	CECAFA Club Championship	Group stage	(Uganda) Villa	2–3			
2003	CECAFA Club Championship	Group stage	(Tanzania) Young Africans	2–1			
2003	CECAFA Club Championship	Quarter-finals	(Burundi) Muzinga	2–3			
2003	CAF Champions League	Preliminary Round	(Kenya) Nzoia Sugar	2–0	0–2	2–2 (3-4 p)	
2006	CAF Champions League	Preliminary round	(Kenya) Tusker	1–3	0–1	1–4	
2011	Kagame Interclub Cup	Group Stage	(Zanzibar) Ocean View	0–2			
2011	Kagame Interclub Cup	Group Stage	(Rwanda) Entincelles	4–1			
2011	Kagame Interclub Cup	Group Stage	(Burundi) Vital'O	1–0			
2011	Kagame Interclub Cup	Group Stage	(Tanzania) Simba	0–0			
2011	Kagame Interclub Cup	Knockout Stage	(Tanzania) Young Africans	0–0 (5–6 p)			
