= Eritrean Premier League =

Top-tier football competition in Eritrea

- Founded: 1994
- Country: Eritrea
- Confederation: CAF
- Level on pyramid: 1
- Domestic cup: Eritrean Cup
- International cup(s): CAF Champions League; CAF Confederation Cup
- Current champions: Al Tahrir (2025–26)
- Most championships: Red Sea (14 titles)

The Eritrean Premier League is the top-tier national football competition in Eritrea. The post-independence championship began in 1994. Regional competitions qualify clubs for a national championship; the 2024 edition involved ten clubs representing Eritrea's regions and the Ministry of Defence.

Between 1953 and Eritrean independence in 1993, Eritrean clubs competed within the Ethiopian league system. Records for the later Eritrean competition are incomplete, and the available roll of honour lists several seasons as unknown or not played.

== Champions ==
The following list reflects seasons identified by the published roll of honour; years without a confirmed champion are shown separately.

Season	Champion
1994	Unknown
1995	Red Sea
1996	Adulis
1997	Al Tahrir
1998–2000	Red Sea
2001	Hintsa
2002	Red Sea
2003	Anseba
2004	Adulis
2005	Red Sea
2006	Al-Nasr (Keren)
2007	Al Tahrir
2008	Asmara Brewery
2009–2014	Red Sea
2015–2016	Not played
2017–2018	Unknown
2019	Red Sea
2020–2022	Unknown
2023	Red Sea
2024	Denden
2025	Denden
2025–26	Al Tahrir

== Performance by club ==
The totals below count only seasons for which a champion is identified from 1995 onward.

Club	City	Titles	Last title
Red Sea	Asmara	14	2023
Al Tahrir	Asmara	3	2025–26
Adulis	Asmara	2	2004
Denden	Asmara	2	2025
Asmara Brewery	Asmara	1	2008
Anseba	Keren	1	2003
Hintsa	Asmara	1	2001
Al-Nasr	Keren	1	2006
