= Adulis Club =

Association football club in Eritrea

- Full name: Adulis Club
- Ground: Cicero Stadium; Asmara, Eritrea
- Capacity: 10,000
- League: Eritrean Premier League

Adulis Club is an Eritrean football club based in Asmara.

== Achievements ==
- Eritrean Premier League: 3

1996, 2004, 2006

== Performance in CAF competitions ==
- CAF Champions League: 1 appearance

2005 – Preliminary Round
