= Cicero Stadium =

Stadium in Asmara, Eritrea

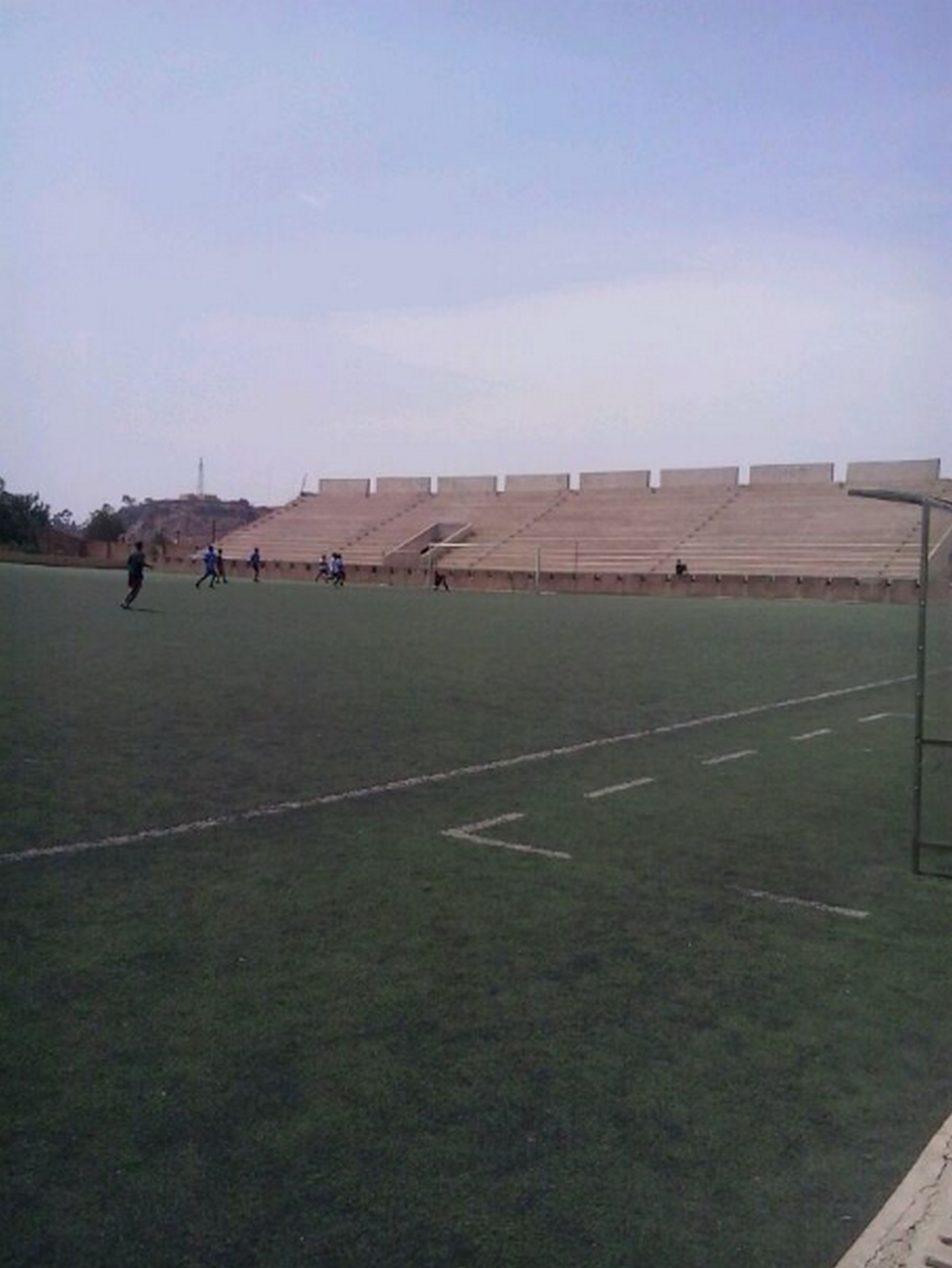
- Interactive map of Cicero Stadium
- Location: Asmara, Eritrea
- Coordinates: 15°20′57.38″N 38°55′16.52″E
- Capacity: 10,000
- Surface: AstroTurf

Construction
- Built: 1938
- Opened: 1939
- Renovated: 1959

Tenants
- Eritrea national football team Red Sea FC; Adulis Club; Hintsa FC; Edaga Hamus

Cicero Stadium is a multi-purpose stadium in Asmara, Eritrea. With a capacity of 10,000, it is currently used mostly for association football matches.

== History ==
The stadium was built in 1938 during the Italian occupation by the Italian businessman Francesco Cicero. It was later used by the GS Asmara, the team winner of the first football championships in Eritrea with the Asmara-born Luciano Vassalo.

The stadium hosted several matches during the 1968 African Cup of Nations. Today, Cicero Stadium is used by the Eritrea national football team for its qualifying matches in the World Cup, CAN, CECAFA Cup and COMESA Cup. Red Sea FC, Adulis Club, Hintsa FC and Edaga Hamus also play their club-level matches in the facility.

In 2005, the stadium received an artificial turf pitch, 3rd generation, One Star field test from FIFA's "Goal" development programme.
