= Tendry Randrianarijaona =

Madagascan professional footballer

Personal information
- Full name: Tendry Manovo Mataniah Randrianarijaona
- Date of birth: 19 March 1998 (age 28)
- Place of birth: Antananarivo, Madagascar
- Height: 1.75 m (5 ft 9 in)
- Position: Attacking midfielder

Team information
- Current team: ENPPI SC
- Number: 37

Senior career*
Years	Team	Apps	(Gls)
2017–2020	CNaPS Sport		
2021–2024	Disciples FC		
2024–2025	ENPPI SC	5	(0)

International career^{‡}
2019–	Madagascar	23	(6)
- * Club domestic league appearances and goals as of 18 July 2025 ‡ National team caps and goals as of 18 July 2025

Tendry Manovo Mataniah Randrianarijaona, sometimes known monymously as Tendry, (born 19 March 1998) is a Madagascan professional footballer who plays as a midfielder for the Madagascar national team. He is currently a free agent.

== Club career ==
Tendry Randrianarijaona previously played for CNaPS Sport and Disciples FC in the Malagasy Pro League, winning the league in 2017, 2018 and 2024. He played in the CAF Champions League for Disciples against Orlando Pirates in December 2024.

Randrianarijaona joined Egyptian Premier League club ENPPI SC in October 2024 and he made his Egyptian Premier League debut for ENPPI SC as a second-half substitute during a 1–0 win against Ismaily SC on 1 December 2024. He also reached the 2024–25 Egyptian Super Cup quarter-finals with ENPPI SC.

== International career ==
Tendry Randrianarijaona made his debut for Madagascar on 20 July 2019 as a late second-half substitute during a 0–0 draw against Seychelles during the 2019 Indian Ocean Island Games group stage. He scored his first goal for Madagascar during a 3–1 win against Mayotte on 30 July 2023.

He scored four goals during the 2023 Indian Ocean Island Games including the winning goal in the final against Réunion.

== Career statistics ==
=== International ===
As of match played 9 September 2024

Appearances and goals by national team and year
National team	Year	Apps	Goals
Madagascar	2019	2	0
Madagascar	2020	0	0
Madagascar	2021	0	0
Madagascar	2022	5	0
Madagascar	2023	12	5
Madagascar	2024	6	1
Madagascar	2025	0	0
Total		23	6

As of match played 9 September 2024
Madagascar score listed first, score column indicates score after each Randrianarijaona goal

List of international goals scored by Lalaïna Rafanomezantsoa
No.	Date	Venue	Cap	Opponent	Score	Result	Competition
1	30 June 2023	Rabemananjara Stadium, Mahajanga, Madagascar	13	Mayotte	3–0	3–1	Friendly
2	24 August 2023	Elgeco Plus Stadium, Antananarivo, Madagascar	14	Seychelles	1–0	1–0	2023 Indian Ocean Island Games
3	31 August 2023	Mahamasina Municipal Stadium, Antananarivo, Madagascar	16	Comoros	2–0	4–2	2023 Indian Ocean Island Games
4	31 August 2023	Mahamasina Municipal Stadium, Antananarivo, Madagascar	16	Comoros	4–2	4–2	2023 Indian Ocean Island Games
5	2 September 2023	Mahamasina Municipal Stadium, Antananarivo, Madagascar	17	Réunion	1–0	1–0	2023 Indian Ocean Island Games
6	22 March 2024	Mahamasina Municipal Stadium, Antananarivo, Madagascar	20	Burundi	1–0	1–0	Friendly

== Honours ==
CNaPS Sport

- Malagasy Pro League
  - Champions (2): 2017, 2018
- Coupe de Madagascar
  - Runner-up (2): 2019, 2021

Disciples FC

- Malagasy Pro League
  - Champions (1): 2024

Madagascar

- African Nations Championship
  - Third place (1): 2022
- Indian Ocean Island Games
  - Champions (1): 2023
