= List of Austrian football transfers summer 2022 =

This is a list of Austrian football transfers for the 2022 summer transfer window. Only transfers featuring Austrian Football Bundesliga are listed.

== Austrian Football Bundesliga ==
Note: Flags indicate national team as has been defined under FIFA eligibility rules. Players may hold more than one non-FIFA nationality.

=== Red Bull Salzburg ===
In:

No.	Pos.	Nation	Player
11	FW	BRA	Fernando (from (Ukraine) Shakhtar Donetsk)
27	MF	FRA	Lucas Gourna-Douath (from (France) Saint-Étienne)
31	DF	SRB	Strahinja Pavlović (from (France) Monaco, previously on loan at (Switzerland) Basel)
—	FW	CIV	Karim Konaté (from (Ivory Coast) ASEC Mimosas)

Out:

No.	Pos.	Nation	Player
6	DF	CMR	Jérôme Onguéné (to (Germany) Eintracht Frankfurt)
11	MF	USA	Brenden Aaronson (to (England) Leeds United)
16	MF	AUT	Zlatko Junuzović (retired)
27	FW	GER	Karim Adeyemi (to (Germany) Borussia Dortmund)
43	DF	DEN	Rasmus Kristensen (to (England) Leeds United)
—	FW	CIV	Karim Konaté (on loan to Liefering)
—	DF	GER	Kilian Ludewig (on loan to (Denmark) AaB, previously on loan at (Netherlands) Willem II)
—	DF	MLI	Daouda Guindo (on loan to (Switzerland) St. Gallen, previously on loan at Liefering)
—	MF	GHA	Forson Amankwah (on loan to SCR Altach, previously on loan at Liefering)
—	MF	MLI	Mamadou Sangare (on loan to (Belgium) Zulte Waregem, previously on loan at GAK)
—	FW	MLI	Dorgeles Nene (on loan to (Belgium) Westerlo, previously on loan at Ried)
—	DF	SUI	Jasper van der Werff (to (Germany) SC Paderborn 07, previously on loan)
—	DF	BIH	Darko Todorović (to (Russia) Akhmat Grozny, previously on loan)

=== Sturm Graz ===
In:

No.	Pos.	Nation	Player
17	MF	AUT	Vesel Demaku (from Austria Wien)
18	DF	CRO	Alois Oroz (on loan from (Netherlands) Vitesse)
19	MF	SLO	Tomi Horvat (from (Slovenia) Mura)
28	DF	AUT	David Schnegg (from (Italy) Venezia, previously on loan at (Italy) Crotone)

Out:

No.	Pos.	Nation	Player
15	FW	CIV	Anderson Niangbo (loan return to (Belgium) Gent)
17	MF	AUT	Lukas Jäger (to SCR Altach)
19	MF	AUT	Andreas Kuen (to (Greece) Atromitos)
29	FW	ZAM	Francisco Mwepu (free agent)
—	MF	AUT	Dardan Shabanhaxhaj (on loan to (Slovenia) Mura, previously on loan at Kapfenberger SV)

=== Austria Wien ===
In:

No.	Pos.	Nation	Player
1	GK	GER	Christian Früchtl (from (Germany) Bayern Munich)
5	DF	ISR	Matan Baltaxa (from (Israel) Maccabi Tel Aviv)
8	MF	AUS	James Holland (from LASK)
11	FW	AUT	Manuel Polster (from (Germany) Stuttgart II)
17	FW	AUT	Andreas Gruber (from LASK)
25	FW	SUI	Haris Tabaković (from Austria Lustenau)
26	MF	AUT	Reinhold Ranftl (on loan from (Germany) Schalke 04)
29	FW	AUT	Marko Raguž (from LASK)
89	DF	FRA	Billy Koumetio (on loan from (England) Liverpool)

Out:

No.	Pos.	Nation	Player
1	GK	AUT	Patrick Pentz (to (France) Reims)
3	DF	MKD	Filip Antovski (on loan to (Croatia) Istra)
5	MF	GER	Eric Martel (loan return to (Germany) RB Leipzig)
8	MF	AUT	Vesel Demaku (to Sturm Graz)
10	MF	AUT	Alexander Grünwald (retired)
5	MF	GER	Eric Martel (loan return to (Germany) RB Leipzig)
18	FW	ENG	Noah Ohio (loan return to (Germany) RB Leipzig)
24	DF	DOM	Christian Schoissengeyr (to (Slovenia) Domžale)
29	DF	AUT	Markus Suttner (retired)

=== Wolfsberger AC ===
In:

No.	Pos.	Nation	Player
1	GK	GER	Hendrik Bonmann (from (Germany) Würzburger Kickers)
7	MF	AUT	Konstantin Kerschbaumer (from (Germany) 1. FC Heidenheim)
8	DF	AUT	Simon Piesinger (from (Denmark) Randers)
10	MF	AUT	Thierno Ballo (from (England) Chelsea)
17	MF	AUT	Ervin Omić (from (Italy) Juventus B)
29	FW	GRE	Nikos Vergos (from (Greece) Panetolikos)
32	GK	AUT	Lukas Gütlbauer (from Ried, previously on loan at FAC)

Out:

No.	Pos.	Nation	Player
7	MF	ISR	Eliel Peretz (free agent)
10	MF	AUT	Michael Liendl (to GAK)
19	MF	AUT	Sven Sprangler (free agent)
23	MF	AUT	Lukas Schöfl (on loan to FAC)
24	MF	AUT	Christopher Wernitznig (to Austria Klagenfurt)
29	GK	AUT	Manuel Kuttin (free agent)
31	GK	AUT	Alexander Kofler (to ATUS Velden)
33	MF	AUT	Kai Stratznig (free agent)
70	MF	AUT	Joshua Steiger (free agent)
77	DF	BIH	Amar Dedić (loan return to Red Bull Salzburg)

=== Rapid Wien ===
In:

No.	Pos.	Nation	Player
5	MF	AUT	Roman Kerschbaum (from Admira Wacker)
7	MF	GER	Nicolas-Gerrit Kühn (from (Germany) Bayern Munich II, previously on loan at (Germany) Erzgebirge Aue)
9	FW	AUT	Guido Burgstaller (from (Germany) FC St. Pauli)
14	MF	SRB	Aleksa Pejić (from (Belarus) Shakhtyor Soligorsk)
19	DF	AUT	Michael Sollbauer (from (Germany) Dynamo Dresden)
22	DF	SVK	Martin Koscelník (from (Czech Republic) Slovan Liberec)
24	MF	AUT	Patrick Greil (from Austria Klagenfurt)
29	MF	AUT	Ante Bajic (from Ried)
38	FW	NED	Ferdy Druijf (from (Netherlands) AZ, previously on loan)

Out:

No.	Pos.	Nation	Player
5	MF	AUT	Robert Ljubičić (to (Croatia) Dinamo Zagreb)
7	MF	AUT	Philipp Schobesberger (free agent)
14	MF	BIH	Srđan Grahovac (free agent)
22	DF	MNE	Filip Stojković (to LASK)
30	DF	AUT	Leo Greiml (to (Germany) Schalke 04)
32	FW	JPN	Koya Kitagawa (to (Japan) Shimizu S-Pulse)
35	MF	AUT	Benjamin Kanuric (to (Germany) Arminia Bielefeld)
36	MF	AUT	Kelvin Arase (to (Germany) Karlsruher SC)
47	MF	AUT	Dalibor Velimirovic (free agent)

=== Austria Klagenfurt ===
In:

No.	Pos.	Nation	Player
1	GK	AUT	Marco Knaller (from Wacker Innsbruck)
4	DF	SRB	Nikola Đorić (from (Serbia) Rad)
9	FW	GER	Sinan Karweina (from (Germany) Türkgücü München)
17	DF	ITA	Simon Straudi (from (Germany) Werder Bremen II)
18	MF	GER	Moritz Berg (from (Germany) 1. FC Magdeburg)
19	MF	SCO	Andy Irving (from (Germany) Türkgücü München)
24	MF	AUT	Christopher Wernitznig (from Wolfsberger AC)
39	FW	GER	Jonas Arweiler (from (Netherlands) Almere City)

Out:

No.	Pos.	Nation	Player
1	GK	GER	Lennart Moser (loan return to (Germany) Union Berlin)
4	MF	AUT	Patrick Greil (to Rapid Wien)
9	FW	CRO	Darijo Pecirep (to Stripfing)
10	MF	GER	Julian von Haacke (free agent)
11	MF	SLO	Rajko Rep (free agent)
12	FW	SWE	Alex Timossi Andersson (loan return to (Germany) Bayern Munich II)
18	MF	GER	Alexander Fuchs (free agent)
20	FW	GER	Tim Maciejewski (loan return to (Germany) Union Berlin)
21	GK	AUT	Marcel Köstenbauer (on loan to (Germany) Viktoria Berlin)
27	DF	AUT	Florian Freissegger (to Leoben)
63	DF	CRO	Ivan Šaravanja (to (Cyprus) Akritas Chlorakas)
71	FW	BIH	Benjamin Hadžić (free agent)

=== WSG Tirol ===
In:

No.	Pos.	Nation	Player
9	FW	SLO	Nik Prelec (from (Italy) Sampdoria, previously on loan at (Slovenia) Olimpija Ljubljana)
11	FW	ARG	Lautaro Rinaldi (from (Argentina) Aldosivi)

Out:

No.	Pos.	Nation	Player
7	FW	AUT	Thomas Sabitzer (loan return to LASK)
8	MF	AUT	Renny Smith (free agent)
9	FW	ALB	Giacomo Vrioni (loan return to (Italy) Juventus)
11	FW	AUT	Felix Kerber (on loan to Dornbirn)
15	DF	GER	Maxime Awoudja (loan return to (Germany) VfB Stuttgart)
20	FW	AUT	Tobias Anselm (loan return to LASK)
22	DF	AUT	Mario Andric (free agent)
24	DF	AUT	Fabian Koch (to Natters)
27	MF	AUT	Markus Wallner (to SV Horn)

=== LASK ===
In:

No.	Pos.	Nation	Player
5	DF	GER	Philipp Ziereis (from (Germany) FC St. Pauli)
11	FW	CRO	Marin Ljubičić (on loan from (Croatia) Hajduk Split)
20	FW	GRE	Efthymis Koulouris (from (Greece) Atromitos)
22	DF	MNE	Filip Stojković (from Rapid Wien)
43	MF	AUT	Nemanja Celic (on loan from (Germany) Darmstadt 98)

Out:

No.	Pos.	Nation	Player
5	DF	GER	Petar Filipović (free agent)
10	FW	AUT	Marko Raguž (to Austria Wien)
13	DF	CYP	Strahinja Kerkez (to (Slovakia) Trenčín)
17	FW	AUT	Andreas Gruber (to Austria Wien)
20	MF	AUT	Marco Sulzner (on loan to First Vienna)
25	MF	AUS	James Holland (to Austria Wien)
44	DF	AUT	Dario Marešić (loan return to (France) Reims)
—	DF	PAN	Andrés Andrade (to (Germany) Arminia Bielefeld, previously on loan)
—	MF	ISR	Yoav Hofmayster (to (Israel) Ironi Kiryat Shmona, previously on loan at (Israel) Maccabi Petah Tikva)
—	FW	PER	Matías Succar (to (Peru) Mannucci, previously on loan at (Czech Republic) Teplice)
—	FW	AUT	Christoph Monschein (to Ried, previously on loan at SCR Altach)
—	FW	SEN	Ibrahima Dramé (to Young Violets, previously on loan at Juniors OÖ)
—	DF	AUT	Sebastian Kapsamer (on loan to Amstetten)
—	FW	AUT	Dominik Weixelbraun (on loan to Amstetten)

=== Hartberg ===
In:

No.	Pos.	Nation	Player
32	MF	SWE	Albert Ejupi (from (Sweden) Helsingborg)

Out:

No.	Pos.	Nation	Player
10	MF	GER	Noel Niemann (loan return to (Germany) Arminia Bielefeld)
26	FW	BEL	Gabriel Lemoine (to (Belgium) La Louvière)
32	MF	MLI	Youba Diarra (loan return to Red Bull Salzburg)
—	GK	AUT	Elias Scherf (on loan to Amstetten, previously on loan at Lafnitz)
—	DF	AUT	Stefan Gölles (to Lafnitz, previously on loan)

=== Ried ===
In:

No.	Pos.	Nation	Player
7	FW	AUT	Christoph Monschein (from LASK, previously on loan at SCR Altach)
8	MF	GER	Michael Martin (from Vorwärts Steyr)
11	MF	AUT	Denizcan Cosgun (from Wacker Innsbruck)
31	FW	GER	Agyemang Diawusie (from (Germany) Dynamo Dresden)

Out:

No.	Pos.	Nation	Player
2	DF	AUT	Luca Meisl (free agent)
5	DF	AUT	Michael Lercher (free agent)
7	MF	AUT	Marcel Canadi (to (Croatia) Šibenik)
11	MF	AUT	Daniel Offenbacher (free agent)
12	MF	AUT	Ante Bajic (to Rapid Wien)
20	DF	AUT	Murat Satin (free agent)
26	MF	AUT	Nicolas Zdichynec (on loan to Vorwärts Steyr)
32	GK	AUT	Christoph Haas (to Admira Wacker)
45	FW	MLI	Dorgeles Nene (loan return to Red Bull Salzburg)
—	GK	AUT	Lukas Gütlbauer (to Wolfsberger AC, previously on loan at FAC)
—	FW	AUT	Lukas Schlosser (to Union Gurten, previously on loan at (Germany) Wacker Burghausen)

=== SCR Altach ===
In:

No.	Pos.	Nation	Player
5	DF	AUT	Lukas Gugganig (from (Germany) VfL Osnabrück)
8	FW	ISR	Guy Dahan (from (Israel) Maccabi Haifa, previously on loan at (Israel) Hapoel Umm al-Fahm)
15	MF	GHA	Forson Amankwah (on loan from Red Bull Salzburg, previously on loan at Liefering)
23	MF	AUT	Lukas Jäger (from Sturm Graz)
29	FW	FRA	Alexis Tibidi (on loan from (Germany) VfB Stuttgart)

Out:

No.	Pos.	Nation	Player
1	GK	AUT	Christoph Riegler (free agent)
5	DF	AUT	Philipp Netzer (retired)
7	FW	AUT	Christoph Monschein (loan return to LASK)
8	MF	AUT	Lukas Parger (on loan to Dornbirn)
11	FW	AUT	Marco Meilinger (free agent)
21	MF	AUT	Lars Nussbaumer (to Dornbirn)
29	MF	AUT	Noah Bitsche (on loan to Vorwärts Steyr)
37	DF	FRA	Mickaël Nanizayamo (loan return to (Switzerland) Lausanne)
55	MF	GER	Gianluca Gaudino (loan return to (Germany) SV Sandhausen)

=== Austria Lustenau ===
In:

No.	Pos.	Nation	Player
9	MF	CPV	Bryan Teixeira (from (France) Clermont, previously on loan)
24	FW	AUT	Anthony Schmid (from FAC)
37	MF	GER	Torben Rhein (on loan from (Germany) Bayern Munich II)
—	MF	SRB	Stefano Surdanovic (from Admira Wacker)
—	GK	AUT	Simon Nesler-Täubl (from AKA Vorarlberg)
—	MF	AUT	Angelo Bacic (from AKA Vorarlberg)
—	DF	AUT	Darijo Grujcic (free agent)

Out:

No.	Pos.	Nation	Player
6	MF	BEL	Brandon Baiye (loan return to (France) Clermont)
10	MF	AUT	Muhammed Cham (loan return to (France) Clermont)
13	DF	AUT	Dragan Marceta (to Vorwärts Steyr)
17	MF	AUT	Raul Marte (on loan to Dornbirn)
18	DF	AUT	Leo Mätzler (loan return to SCR Altach)
20	MF	BRA	Wallace (to (Croatia) Gorica)
24	MF	AUT	Nicolai Bösch (to SV Lochau)
25	FW	SUI	Haris Tabaković (to Austria Wien)
37	DF	AUT	Carlos Berlinger (to SW Bregenz)
42	DF	AUT	Florian Rusch (to SC Rabenstein)
98	GK	AUT	Florian Eres (to Vorwärts Steyr)

== See also ==
- 2022–23 Austrian Football Bundesliga
