= 2019 COSAFA U-20 Cup =

2019 COSAFA Under-20 Championship
Tournament details
- Host country: Zambia
- Dates: 4-14 December 2019
- Teams: 12 (from 1 association)
- Venue: 2 (in 1 host city)

Final positions
- Champions: Zambia (11th title)
- Runners-up: South Africa
- Third place: Angola
- Fourth place: Madagascar

Tournament statistics
- Matches played: 22
- Goals scored: 81 (3.68 per match)
- Top scorer: (Angola)Zini Salvador (6 goals)

The 2019 COSAFA U-20 Cup was the 26th edition of the COSAFA U-20 Challenge Cup, an international youth competition open to national associations of the COSAFA region. It took place between 4 December and 14 December in Zambia.

The competition was open to players born on or before 1 January 2000. Zambia were crowned champions against South Africa winning their 11th title. Zini Salvador (from Angola), aged 17, was the top scorer with 6 goals.

== Participants ==
- Angola
- Botswana
- Comoros
- Lesotho
- Madagascar
- Malawi
- Mauritius
- Mozambique
- South Africa
- Seychelles
- Eswatini
- Zambia
- Zimbabwe

== Match officials ==
Referees

- Mohamed Athoumani (Comoros)
- Patrice Milazar (Mauritius)
- (Ms) Rosaly Rosalie (Madagascar)
- Retselisitsoe David Molise (Lesotho)
- Gift Chicco (Malawi)
- Mathews M. Hamalila (Zambia)
- Yvon Havelock (Seychelles)
- (Eswatini) Njabulo Thembinkosi Dlamini (Swaziland)
- Keabetswe Dintwa (Botswana)

Assistant Referees

- Evanildo Gaspar Martins (Angola)
- Zacarias Baloi (Mozambique)
- (Ms) Stellah Ruvinga (Zimbabwe)
- Brighton Nyika (Zimbabwe)
- (South Africa) Elphas Sitole South Africa)
- Chiwoyu Sinyangwe (Zambia)
- Alex Muzibwane Lumponjani (Namibia)
- Dimbiniaina Andriatianarivelo (Madagascar)
- (Ms) Harilalaina Razafitsalama (Madagascar)

== Venues ==
Lusaka
Nkoloma Stadium	Sunset Stadium
Capacity: 5,000	Capacity: 5,100

== Groups ==
=== Group A ===
Pos	Team	Pld	W	D	L	GF	GA	GD	Pts	Qualification
1	Zambia (H)	3	3	0	0	9	1	+8	9	Advance to knockout stage
2	Malawi	3	1	1	1	5	2	+3	4	
3	Botswana	3	1	1	1	2	6	−4	4	
4	Comoros	3	0	0	3	1	8	−7	0	

Source: COSAFA
(H) Hosts
4 December 2019
12:45

Comoros	0–4	Malawi
	Report	Mwaungulu 28', 66', 90'; Madinga 58'

Nkoloma Stadium, Lusaka
Referee: Yvon Havelock (Seychelles)
4 December 2019
15:30

Zambia	5–0	Botswana
Mwepu 5'; Mwaba 34'; Mukeya 64', 80'; Banda 85'	Report

Nkoloma Stadium, Lusaka
Referee: Retselisitsoe Molise (Lesotho)

7 December 2019
12:45

Botswana	2–2	Malawi
Chose 55'; David 80'	Report	Nkhoma 60'; Maomga 63'

Nkoloma Stadium, Lusaka
Referee: Mohamed Athoumani (Comoros)
7 December 2019
15:30

Zambia	2–0	Comoros
Mwepu 56'; Kampukesa 81'	Report

Nkoloma Stadium, Lusaka
Referee: Keabetswe Dintwa (Botswana)

9 December 2019
15:30

Zambia	2–1	Malawi
Mafwenta 40'; Mwepu 68'	Report	Madinga 71'

Nkoloma Stadium, Lusaka
Referee: Retselisitsoe Molise (Lesotho)
9 December 2019
15:30

Comoros	1–2	Botswana
Y. Mohamed 47'	Report	Chose 29'; Kolagano 64'

Sunset Stadium, Lusaka
Referee: Rosalie Rosalie (Madagascar)

=== Group B ===
Pos	Team	Pld	W	D	L	GF	GA	GD	Pts	Qualification
1	South Africa	3	2	1	0	10	1	+9	7	Advance to knockout stage
2	Madagascar	3	2	1	0	6	2	+4	7	Advance to knockout stage
3	Mauritius	3	0	1	2	3	9	−6	1	
4	Lesotho	3	0	1	2	2	9	−7	1	

Source: COSAFA
5 December 2019
12:45

Lesotho	0–3	Madagascar
	Report	Todisoa 23'; Randrianantenaina 71'; Menakely 77'

Sunset Stadium, Lusaka
Referee: Mohamed Athoumani (Comoros)
5 December 2019
15:30

South Africa	5–0	Mauritius
Mkiva 9'; Mitchell 11'; Appollis 73', 80'; Mcaba 90'	Report

Sunset Stadium, Lusaka
Referee: Rosalie Rosalie (Madagascar)

8 December 2019
10:30

Mauritius	2–2	Lesotho
D. Aristide 67'; Roussety 90'	Report	Botsane 16', 71'

Sunset Stadium, Lusaka
8 December 2019
15:30

Madagascar	1–1	South Africa
Soloniaina 59'	Report	Mkiva 79'

Sunset Stadium, Lusaka
Referee: Yvon Havelock (Seychelles)

10 December 2019
15:30

South Africa	4–0	Lesotho
Mkiva 20'; Milazi 22'; Human 41'; Sifama 51'	Report

Nkoloma Stadium, Lusaka
Referee: Keabetswe Dintwa (Botswana)
10 December 2019
15:30

Madagascar	2–1	Mauritius
Randrianantenaina 6'; Vévé Ranaivo Harison 35'	Report	Moutou 70'

Sunset Stadium, Lusaka
Referee: Mathews Hamalila (Zambia)

=== Group C ===
Pos	Team	Pld	W	D	L	GF	GA	GD	Pts	Qualification
1	Angola	3	3	0	0	13	1	+12	9	Advance to knockout stage
2	Eswatini	3	2	0	1	5	4	+1	6	
3	Mozambique	3	1	0	2	3	5	−2	3	
4	Seychelles	3	0	0	3	2	13	−11	0	

Source: COSAFA
4 December 2019
10:00

Angola	8–0	Seychelles
dos Santos 7'; Salvador 10', 56'; Afonso 18', 45'; Kiaku 39'; Gastão 83'; Mbulu 84'	Report

Nkoloma Stadium, Lusaka
Referee: Gift Chicco (Malawi)
5 December 2019
15:30

Mozambique	0–2	Eswatini
	Report	Zwane 65'; Ndlovu 90'

Sunset Stadium, Lusaka
Referee: Patrice Milazar (Mauritius)

7 December 2019
10:00

Angola	1–0	Mozambique
Salvador 53'	Report

Nkoloma Stadium, Lusaka
Referee: Mathews Hamalila (Zambia)
8 December 2019
12:45

Seychelles	0–2	Eswatini
	Report	Lushaba 20' (pen.); Ndlovu 45'

Sunset Stadium, Lusaka
Referee: Retselisitsoe Molis (Lesotho)

9 December 2019
12:45

Angola	4–1	Eswatini
Salvador 2'; Gastão 14', 73'; Muondo Dala 53'	Report	Ndzinisa 55'

Nkoloma Stadium, Lusaka
Referee: Patrice Milazar (Mauritius)
9 December 2019
12:45

Mozambique	3–2	Seychelles
Joao 37', 39'; Manjate 61'	Report	Brutus 23'; Fanchette 90'

Sunset Stadium, Lusaka
Referee: Gift Chicco (Malawi)

== Knockout stage ==
=== Bracket ===
Semi-finals
12 December
South Africa (p)	2 (5)
Madagascar	2 (4)
12 December
Zambia	3
Angola	0

Final
14 December
South Africa	0
Zambia	3
Third place
14 December
Madagascar	1
Angola	5

=== Semi-finals ===
12 December 2019
12:00

South Africa	2–2	Madagascar
Appollis 66', 90'	Report	Vévé Ranaivo Harison 12'; Randrianantenaina 29'
Penalties
	5–4

Nkoloma Stadium, Lusaka
Referee: Mathews Hamalila (Zambia)

12 December 2019
15:30

Zambia	3–0	Angola
Gondwe 31', 76'; Mwepu 80'	Report

Nkoloma Stadium, Lusaka
Referee: Patrice Milazar (Mauritius)

=== Third Place ===
14 December 2019
11:30

Madagascar	1–5	Angola
Randrianantenaina 59'	Report	Congo Zalata 9', 15'; Salvador 46', 69'; Sengui 83'

Nkoloma Stadium, Lusaka
Referee: Gift Chicco (Malawi)

=== Final ===
14 December 2019
15:00

South Africa	0–3	Zambia
	Report	Munalula 40', 84'; Mwepu 45'

Nkoloma Stadium, Lusaka
Referee: Retselisitsoe Molise (Lesotho)

== Winners ==
COSAFA Under-20 Championship

Zambia
11th title
