= Théodin Ramanjary =

Malagasy footballer

Personal information
- Full name: Théodin Roger Ramanjary
- Date of birth: 16 August 1996 (age 30)
- Place of birth: Andoany, Madagascar
- Height: 1.82 m (6 ft 0 in)
- Position: Defender

Team information
- Current team: Fosa Juniors
- Number: 15

Senior career*
Years	Team	Apps	(Gls)
2016–	Fosa Juniors		

International career^{‡}
2018–	Madagascar	5	(0)
- * Club domestic league appearances and goals ‡ National team caps and goals as of 23:32, 19 October 2021 (UTC)

Théodin Roger Ramanjary (born 16 August 1996) is a Malagasy professional footballer who plays as a defender for Malagasy Pro League club Fosa Juniors and the Madagascar national team.

== Honours ==
Fosa Juniors

- THB Champions League: 2019
- Coupe de Madagascar: 2017, 2019

Madagascar

- Indian Ocean Island Games Gold medal: 2023
