= 2017 THB Champions League =

THB Champions League
- Season: 2017
- Champions: CNaPS Sport
- Matches: 102
- Goals: 408 (4 per match)
- Average goals/game: 4
- Biggest home win: HZAM Amparafaravola 13-2 FC Maeva in 6 October, 2017
- Biggest away win: AS Espoir 1-9 FC Angele in 8 September, 2017

The 2017 THB Champions League is the top level football competition in Madagascar. It started on 1 September 2017 and ended on 12 November 2017.

== Qualifying ==
24 teams participated in the tournament: all 22 regional league champions and the runner-ups of Itasy (who provided the 2016 league and cup champions) and Analamanga (who provided the 2016 runner-ups in both championships). The runner-ups were COSFAP Antananarivo and RTS-Jet Mada. There were no withdrawals in this season, every team played the tournament.

== Format ==
=== First phase ===
The 24 qualified teams would be separated in 4 groups of 6 teams, where all teams play against each other once, then the 3 teams with the most points in each group would be qualified to the second phase.

=== Second phase ===
The 12 qualified teams from the first phase would be separated into 2 groups of 6 teams, where all teams play against each other once, then the 2 teams with the most points in each group would be qualified to the Poule des As.

=== Poule des As ===
The 4 qualified teams would play against each other twice (home and away) then the team with the most points becomes Malagasy champions.

== First phase ==
=== Vondrona A ===
Pos	Team	Pld	W	D	L	GF	GA	GD	Pts
1	COSFAP Antananarivo (Analamanga)	5	4	1	0	17	3	14	13
2	USSK Ambanja (Diana)	5	2	2	1	13	8	5	8
3	Varatraza Antsohihy (Sofia)	5	2	1	2	9	14	-5	7
4	Fosa Juniors FC (Boeny)	5	1	2	2	7	5	2	5
5	FC Iharana (Sava)	5	1	2	2	7	13	-6	5
6	MTM Maintirano (Melaky)	5	0	2	3	5	15	-10	2

=== Vondrona B ===
Pos	Team	Pld	W	D	L	GF	GA	GD	Pts
1	HZAM Amparafaravola (Alaotra-Mangoro)	5	3	1	1	5	3	2	10
2	Ajesaia (Bongolava)	5	3	0	2	11	2	9	9
3	RTS-Jet Mada (Itasy)	5	3	0	2	9	4	5	9
4	Fifafifi (Atsinanana)	5	2	2	1	8	8	0	8
5	FC Vakinankaratra (Vakinankaratra)	5	2	1	2	9	7	2	7
6	CF Mahatsara STF (Analanjirofo)	5	0	0	5	2	20	-18	0

=== Vondrona C ===
Pos	Team	Pld	W	D	L	GF	GA	GD	Pts
1	ASSM Elgeco Plus (Analamanga)	5	4	1	0	27	3	24	13
2	AS TOP DOM (Amoron'i Mania)	5	4	1	0	12	3	9	13
3	FC Maeva (Betsiboka)	5	2	1	2	14	15	-1	7
4	VFM Vatovavy-Fitovinany (Vatovavy-Fitovinany)	5	2	1	2	11	12	-1	7
5	FC Malaimbandy (Menabe)	5	1	0	4	7	20	-13	3
6	FC Menagnara (Atsimo-Atsinanana)	5	0	0	5	3	21	-18	0

=== Vondrona D ===
Pos	Team	Pld	W	D	L	GF	GA	GD	Pts
1	CNaPS Sport (Itasy)	5	5	0	0	22	2	20	15
2	FC Angele (Anosy)	5	3	0	2	20	9	11	9
3	Zanak'Ala FC (Haute Matsiatra)	5	3	0	2	20	10	10	9
4	3FB Toliara (Atsimo-Andrefana)	5	2	1	2	8	7	1	7
5	JSA Antalaha Amazone (Ihorombe)	5	1	1	3	6	22	-16	4
6	AS Espoir Ambovombe (Androy)	5	0	0	5	5	31	-26	0

==== Note ====
In round 5 on September 10, AS Espoir Ambovombe awarded a 3-0 win to JSA.

== Second phase ==
=== Vondrona 1 ===
Pos	Team	Pld	W	D	L	GF	GA	GD	Pts
1	CNaPS Sport (Itasy)	5	4	1	0	22	5	17	13
2	HZAM Amparafaravola (Alaotra-Mangoro)	5	3	1	1	19	8	11	10
3	Ajesaia (Bongolava)	5	3	1	1	15	7	8	10
4	Varatraza Antsohihy (Sofia)	5	1	1	3	6	11	-5	4
5	USSK Ambanja (Diana)	5	1	1	3	5	14	-9	4
6	FC Maeva (Betsiboka)	5	0	1	4	5	27	-22	1

=== Vondrona 2 ===
Pos	Team	Pld	W	D	L	GF	GA	GD	Pts
1	COSFAP Antananarivo (Analamanga)	5	4	0	1	10	4	6	12
2	ASSM Elgeco Plus (Analamanga)	5	3	1	1	7	4	3	10
3	AS TOP DOM (Amoron'i Mania)	5	2	1	2	5	5	0	7
4	RTS-Jet Mada (Itasy)	5	2	1	2	4	4	0	7
5	Zanak'Ala FC (Haute Matsiatra)	5	2	0	3	5	6	-1	6
6	FC Angele (Anosy)	5	0	1	4	2	10	-8	1

== Final phase ==
Pos	Team	Pld	W	D	L	GF	GA	GD	Pts
1	CNaPS Sport (Itasy)	6	6	0	0	15	4	11	18
2	ASSM Elgeco Plus (Analamanga)	6	4	0	2	17	11	6	12
3	COSFAP Antananarivo (Analamanga)	6	1	1	4	8	16	-8	4
4	HZAM Amparafaravola (Alaotra-Mangoro)	6	0	1	5	6	15	-9	1
