= 2023 U-23 Africa Cup of Nations qualification =

Qualification procedures for the 2023 U-23 AFCON

Tournament details
- Dates: 21 September 2022 – 28 March 2023
- Teams: 38 (from 1 confederation)

Tournament statistics
- Matches played: 60
- Goals scored: 133 (2.22 per match)
- Top scorer(s): (Madagascar) Arnaud Randrianantenaina (Niger) Kairou Amoustapha (4 goals each)

This article details the qualification schedule and matches for the 2023 U-23 Africa Cup of Nations.

Players born 1 January 2001 or later were eligible to participate in the competition. A total of 8 teams, including automatically qualified hosts Morocco, qualified to play in the group stages of this edition of the tournament, which also doubled as the first stage of the African qualification for the 2024 Summer Olympics men's football tournament in France.

== Teams ==
Apart from Morocco, the remaining 53 CAF members were eligible to enter qualification and a total of 38 national teams entered its draw which was announced on 18 August 2022. Eighteen best teams from the previous edition and its qualification procedures were given a bye to the second round.

Main tournament edition hosts	Bye to second round (18 teams)	First round entrants (20 teams)
Morocco	Algeria; Benin; Cameroon; Congo; Egypt; Gabon; Ghana; Guinea; Ivory Coast; Mali; Nigeria; Senegal; Sierra Leone; South Africa; Sudan; Tunisia; Uganda; Zambia	Angola; Botswana; Burkina Faso; DR Congo; Eswatini; Ethiopia; Gambia; Guinea-Bissau; Libya; Madagascar; Mauritania; Mauritius; Mozambique; Namibia; Niger; Rwanda; Seychelles; South Sudan; Tanzania; Togo

Did not enter

- Burundi
- Cape Verde
- Central African Republic
- Chad
- Comoros
- Djibouti
- Equatorial Guinea
- Eritrea
- Kenya
- Lesotho
- Liberia
- Malawi
- São Tomé and Príncipe
- Somalia
- Zimbabwe

== Format ==
Qualification ties were played on a home-and-away, two-legged basis. If the aggregate score was tied after the second leg, away goals rule was applied and if still tied, penalty shoot-out (no extra time) was used to determine the winner.

== Schedule ==
All matches were played during the FIFA International Window and its schedules were as follows:

Round	Leg	Date
First round	First leg	19–27 September 2022
First round	Second leg	19–27 September 2022
Second round	First leg	22–23 October 2022
Second round	Second leg	29–30 October 2022
Third round	First leg	22–28 March 2023
Third round	Second leg	22–28 March 2023

== First round ==
Team 1	Agg.	Team 2	1st leg	2nd leg
Guinea-Bissau	2–4	Niger	0–0	2–4
Tanzania	3–3 (a)	South Sudan	0–0	3–3
Eswatini	3–2	Botswana	2–0	1–2
Mauritania	1–2	Togo	1–0	0–2
Ethiopia	0–1	DR Congo	0–0	0–1
Mozambique	5–1	Mauritius	3–0	2–1
Burkina Faso	2–2 (a)	Gambia	0–1	2–1
Libya	4–4 (a)	Rwanda	4–1	0–3
Madagascar	12–1	Seychelles	5–0	7–1
Angola	8–1	Namibia	2–1	6–0

23 September 2022
16:00 UTC+3

Guinea-Bissau	0–0	Niger
	Report

Estádio 24 de Setembro, Bissau
27 September 2022
16:00 UTC+1

Niger	4–2	Guinea-Bissau
Boulhassane 36'; Amoustapha 47', 67'; Amoumane 50'	Report	Camará 78', 88'

Stade Général Seyni Kountché, Niamey
Referee: Adaari Abdul-Latif (Ghana)

Niger won 4–2 on aggregate.

23 September 2022
16:00 UTC+3

Tanzania	0–0	South Sudan
	Report

Chamazi Stadium, Dar es Salaam
26 September 2022
16:00 UTC+2

South Sudan	3–3	Tanzania
Lual 24'; Malish 54'; Angier 66' (pen.)	Report	Sopu 10' (pen.); Msengi 40'; John 68'

Stade Huye, Butare (Rwanda) (Note: South Sudan played their home matches overseas, since none of their stadiums met the quality standards set in CAF's regulations.)
Referee: Retselisitsoe Molise (Lesotho)

Tanzania won 3–3 on aggregate via the away goals rule.

23 September 2022
15:00 UTC+2

Eswatini	2–0	Botswana
B. Dlamini 45'; Simelane 48'	Report

Somhlolo National Stadium, Lobamba
Referee: Mathews Hamalila (Zambia)
27 September 2022
15:00 UTC+2

Botswana	2–1	Eswatini
Molefe 30'; Mbakile 45'	Report	N. Dlamini 75'

Obed Itani Chilume Stadium, Francistown

Eswatini won 3–2 on aggregate.

24 September 2022
19:00 UTC+0

Mauritania	1–0	Togo
El Abd 90+4'	Report

Stade Cheikha Ould Boïdiya, Nouakchott
Referee: Alhasan Bass (Gambia)
27 September 2022
16:00 UTC+0

Togo	2–0	Mauritania
Avotor 47'; Laba 68'	Report

Stade de Kégué, Lomé
Referee: Tanislas Ahomlanto (Benin)

Togo won 2–1 on aggregate.

22 September 2022
16:00 UTC+3

Ethiopia	Voided (0–0)	DR Congo
	Report

Abebe Bikila Stadium, Addis Ababa
27 September 2022
15:30 UTC+1

DR Congo	Voided (1–0)	Ethiopia
Bongonga 74'	Report

Stade des Martyrs, Kinshasa

DR Congo won 1–0 on aggregate, but later got disqualified and had its result forfeited for fielding ineligible players. Although Ethiopia advanced to the final round, they chose not to compete and thus Algeria advanced in their place.

24 September 2022
16:00 UTC+2

Mozambique	3–0	Mauritius
Gaby 13'; Lorenzoni 32'; Sidat 84'	Report

Estádio do Zimpeto, Maputo
27 September 2022
16:00 UTC+4

Mauritius	1–2	Mozambique
Aristide 90+1' (pen.)	Report	Sidat 14'; Ivan 82'

Complexe Sportif de Côte d'Or, Saint Pierre

Mozambique won 5–1 on aggregate.

21 September 2022
16:00 UTC+1

Burkina Faso	0–1	Gambia
	Report	Bojang 78' (pen.)

Stade de l'Amitié, Cotonou (Benin) (Note: Burkina Faso played their home matches outside the country, since none of the stadiums met the quality standards set in CAF's regulations.)
Referee: Abubakar Abdullahi (Nigeria)
27 September 2022
19:00 UTC+1

Gambia	1–2	Burkina Faso
Bâ 82'	Report	Dao 8'; Botué 70' (pen.)

Stade de Marrakech, Marrakesh (Morocco) (Note: Gambia played their home matches in Morocco, since none of their home stadiums met the quality standards set in CAF's regulations.)

Burkina Faso won 2–2 on aggregate via the away goals rule.

23 September 2022
19:00 UTC+2

Libya	4–1	Rwanda
Al-Qulaib 20' (pen.), 48'; Yousef 52'; Salama 88'	Report	Kamanzi 76'

Martyrs of February Stadium, Benghazi
27 September 2022
15:00 UTC+2

Rwanda	3–0	Libya
Niyigena 38', 53'; Rudasingwa 72' (pen.)	Report

Stade Huye, Butare
Referee: Souleiman Djama (Djibouti)

Rwanda won 4–4 on aggregate via the away goals rule.

24 September 2022
16:00 UTC+3

Madagascar	5–0	Seychelles
Randrianantenaina 12', 38'; Raheriniaina 16'; Jinidy 49'; Paul 87' (pen.)	Report

Mahamasina Municipal Stadium, Antananarivo
Referee: Dharamveer Hurbungs (Mauritius)
27 September 2022
16:00 UTC+3

Seychelles	1–7	Madagascar
Aboudou 4'	Report	Randrianandrasana 7'; Raheriniaina 11', 83'; Randrianantenaina 18', 66'; Fauré 54' (o.g.); Ratsimbazafy 85'

Mahamasina Municipal Stadium, Antananarivo (Madagascar) (Note: Seychelles played their home matches overseas, since none of their stadiums met the quality standards set in CAF's regulations.)

Madagascar won 12–1 on aggregate.

21 September 2022
17:00 UTC+1

Angola	2–1	Namibia
Bito 63'; Picas 70'	Report	Tsuseb 58'

Estádio 11 de Novembro, Luanda
24 September 2022
16:00 UTC+1

Namibia	0–6	Angola
	Report	Benvindo 5'; Benarfa 23'; Capita 29', 76'; Bito 46'; Melono 84'

Estádio 11 de Novembro, Luanda (Angola)

Angola won 8–1 on aggregate.

== Second round ==
Team 1	Agg.	Team 2	1st leg	2nd leg
Niger	1–1 (a)	Ivory Coast	0–0	1–1
Sudan	3–3 (a)	Benin	2–0	1–3
Tanzania	1–3	Nigeria	1–1	0–2
Guinea	w/o (Note: Guinea won on a walkover after Uganda withdrew from the competition.)	Uganda	—	—
Eswatini	0–1	Egypt	0–0	0–1
Sierra Leone	1–2	Zambia	1–1	0–1
Togo	2–2 (a)	South Africa	2–2	0–0
Congo	2–2 (a)	Tunisia	1–0	1–2
DR Congo	w/o (Note: DR Congo originally won the tie, but were later disqualified after competing in the second round for fielding ineligible players. Algeria advanced to the final round.) (Note: Algeria won on a walkover after Ethiopia withdrew from the competition.)	Algeria	—	—
Mozambique	1–4	Ghana	1–2	0–2
Burkina Faso	0–0 (3–5 p)	Senegal	0–0	0–0
Rwanda	1–2	Mali	1–1	0–1
Madagascar	0–5	Gabon	0–1	0–4
Angola	2–3	Cameroon	2–3	0–0

Notes:

22 October 2022
16:00 UTC+1

Niger	0–0	Ivory Coast
	Report

Stade Général Seyni Kountché, Niamey
Referee: Hamidou Diero (Burkina Faso)
29 October 2022
17:00 UTC+0

Ivory Coast	1–1	Niger
Traoré 59'	Report	Amoustapha 46'

Stade de Yamoussoukro, Yamoussoukro

Niger won 1–1 on aggregate via the away goals rule.

23 October 2022
15:30 UTC+2

Sudan	2–0	Benin
Nouh 44'; Abdalah 80'	Report

Al-Merrikh Stadium, Omdurman
Referee: Abongile Tom (South Africa)
30 October 2022
17:00 UTC+1

Benin	3–1	Sudan
Abdou 38'; Dassi 42'; Hounkpè 72'	Report	Winsavi 82' (o.g.)

Stade de l'Amitié, Cotonou
Referee: Abdel Aziz Bouh (Mauritania)

Sudan won 3–3 on aggregate via the away goals rule.

22 October 2022
16:00 UTC+3

Tanzania	1–1	Nigeria
Msengi 76' (pen.)	Report	Makanjuola 29' (pen.)

Benjamin Mpaka Stadium, Dar es Salaam
Referee: Souleiman Djama (Djibouti)
29 October 2022
16:00 UTC+1

Nigeria	2–0	Tanzania
Ogunniyi 59'; Makanjuola 67' (pen.)	Report

Lekan Salami Stadium, Ibadan
Referee: Gnama Aklesso (Togo)

Nigeria won 3–1 on aggregate.

23 October 2022
15:00 UTC+2

Eswatini	0–0	Egypt
	Report

Somhlolo National Stadium, Lobamba
Referee: Retselisitsoe Molise (Lesotho)
30 October 2022
20:00 UTC+2

Egypt	1–0	Eswatini
Faisal 70'	Report

Alexandria Stadium, Alexandria

Egypt won 1–0 on aggregate.

22 October 2022
16:00 UTC+0

Sierra Leone	1–1	Zambia
A. Conteh 58' (pen.)	Report	Mutale 90' (pen.)

SKD Sports Complex, Monrovia (Liberia) (Note: Sierra Leone played their home matches in Liberia, since their only stadium which satisfies the criteria of hosting international matches – the Siaka Steven Stadium in Freetown – is undergoing long term renovations.)
29 October 2022
15:00 UTC+2

Zambia	1–0	Sierra Leone
Phiri 65'	Report

National Heroes Stadium, Lusaka

Zambia won 2–1 on aggregate.

23 October 2022
16:00 UTC+0

Togo	2–2	South Africa
Laba 21'; Wetchire 80' (pen.)	Report	Van Wyk 28'; Cupido 31' (pen.)

Stade de Kégué, Lomé
Referee: Moussa Ahmadou Alou (Niger)
30 October 2022
15:00 UTC+2

South Africa	0–0	Togo
	Report

Orlando Stadium, Johannesburg
Referee: Mashood Ssali (Uganda)

South Africa on 2–2 on aggregate via the away goals rule.

23 October 2022
15:30 UTC+1

Congo	1–0	Tunisia
Bassinga 1'	Report

Stade Alphonse Massemba-Débat, Brazzaville
Referee: Blaise Yuven Ngwa (Cameroon)
30 October 2022
15:30 UTC+1

Tunisia	2–1	Congo
Labidi 9'; Garreb 60'	Report	Bassinga 85'

Stade Olympique Hammadi Agrebi, Radès
Referee: Amin Omar (Egypt)

Congo won 2–2 on aggregate via the away goals rule.

23 October 2022
15:30 UTC+1

DR Congo	Voided (4–1)	Algeria
Mujaya 3'; Ikangalombo 20', 23'; Bakata 56'	Report	Bekkouche 85'

Stade des Martyrs, Kinshasa
Referee: Santillan da Costa (São Tomé and Príncipe)
30 October 2022
18:00 UTC+1

Algeria	Voided (3–1)	DR Congo
Belkhir 10', 63'; Bekkouche 48'	Report	Mwamba 58'

8 May 1945 Stadium, Sétif
Referee: Noureddine El Jaafari (Morocco)

DR Congo won 5–4 on aggregate but was later disqualified, thus Algeria advanced to the final round.

23 October 2022
15:00 UTC+2

Mozambique	1–2	Ghana
Vilanculos 88'	Report	Afriyie 65' (pen.), 76' (pen.)

Estádio do Zimpeto, Maputo
Referee: Ibrahim Tsimanohitsy (Madagascar)
30 October 2022
15:00 UTC+0

Ghana	2–0	Mozambique
Simba 45+1'; Afriyie 54' (pen.)	Report

Baba Yara Stadium, Kumasi
Referee: Bakary Gassama (Gambia)

Ghana won 4–1 on aggregate.

23 October 2022
15:00 UTC+1

Burkina Faso	0–0	Senegal
	Report

Stade de l'Amitié, Cotonou (Benin)
29 October 2022
19:00 UTC+0

Senegal	0–0	Burkina Faso
	Report
Penalties
A. Ndiaye (penalty scored); Seydi (penalty scored); Guèye (penalty scored); Diagne (penalty scored); M. Camara (penalty scored)	5–3	B. Dao (penalty missed); Tinta (penalty scored); Botué (penalty scored); H. Ouédraogo (penalty scored)

Stade Abdoulaye Wade, Dakar
Referee: Younoussa Camara (Guinea)

Senegal won 5–3 on penalties and advanced to the final round.

22 October 2022
15:00 UTC+2

Rwanda	1–1	Mali
Diaby 44' (o.g.)	Report	Diomandé 43'

Stade Huye, Butare
Referee: Hassan Hagi (Somalia)
29 October 2022
17:00 UTC+0

Mali	1–0	Rwanda
Traoré 35'	Report

Stade du 26 Mars, Bamako
Referee: Stanislas Ahomlanto (Benin)

Mali won 2–1 on aggregate.

23 October 2022
16:00 UTC+3

Madagascar	0–1	Gabon
	Report	Ovono 65'

Mahamasina Municipal Stadium, Antananarivo
Referee: Celso Alvação (Mozambique)
29 October 2022
15:30 UTC+1

Gabon	4–0	Madagascar
Mbenga 4'; Ovono 21'; Kabinambele 56'; Nkoghe 80'	Report

Stade de Franceville, Franceville

Gabon won 5–0 on aggregate.

22 October 2022
16:00 UTC+1

Angola	2–3	Cameroon
Zini 14', 88'	Report	Kaiba 7'; Ndjantou 65', 73'

Estádio 11 de Novembro, Luanda
30 October 2022
16:00 UTC+1

Cameroon	0–0	Angola
	Report

Ahmadou Ahidjo Stadium, Yaoundé
Referee: Pierre Atcho (Gabon)

Cameroon won 3–2 on aggregate.

== Third round ==
Winners qualified for the 2023 U-23 Africa Cup of Nations.

Team 1	Agg.	Team 2	1st leg	2nd leg
Niger	2–1	Sudan	0–0	2–1
Nigeria	0–2	Guinea	0–0	0–2
Egypt	2–0	Zambia	2–0	0–0
South Africa	1–1 (a)	Congo	1–1	0–0
Algeria	1–2	Ghana	1–1	0–1
Senegal	3–4	Mali	3–1	0–3
Gabon	1–1 (7–6 p)	Cameroon	1–0	0–1

22 March 2023
16:30 UTC+1

Niger	0–0	Sudan
	Report

Stade Général Seyni Kountché, Niamey
28 March 2023
22:00 UTC+2

Sudan	1–2	Niger
Manu 88'	Report	Boulhassane 30'; Amoustapha 78'

Al-Hilal Stadium, Omdurman
Referee: Godfrey Nkhakananga (Malawi)

Niger won 2–1 on aggregate.

22 March 2023
16:00 UTC+1

Nigeria	0–0	Guinea
	Report

Moshood Abiola National Stadium, Abuja
Referee: Sabri Mohamed Fadul (Sudan)
28 March 2023
18:00 UTC+0

Guinea	2–0	Nigeria
Bah 61'; Soumah 76'	Report

Moulay Hassan Stadium, Rabat (Morocco)
Referee: Yannick Kabanga Malala (DR Congo)

Guinea won 2–0 on aggregate.

22 March 2023
18:00 UTC+2

Egypt	2–0	Zambia
Adel 73'; Atef 88'	Report

30 June Stadium, Cairo
Referee: Tsegay Mogos Teklu (Eritrea)
26 March 2023
15:00 UTC+2

Zambia	0–0	Egypt
	Report

Levy Mwanawasa Stadium, Ndola
Referee: Jeannot Franck Bito (Cameroon)

Egypt won 2–0 on aggregate.

23 March 2023
15:00 UTC+2

South Africa	1–1	Congo
Maseko 67'	Report	Bissila 44'

Dobsonville Stadium, Johannesburg
27 March 2023
17:00 UTC+1

Congo	0–0	South Africa
	Report

Stade Alphonse Massemba-Débat, Brazzaville

Congo won 1–1 on aggregate via the away goals rule.

24 March 2023
22:00 UTC+1

Algeria	1–1	Ghana
Bekkouche 90+2'	Report	Issahaku 86'

19 May 1956 Stadium, Annaba
Referee: Hassen Corneh (Liberia)
28 March 2023
16:00 UTC+0

Ghana	1–0	Algeria
Issahaku 12'	Report

Baba Yara Stadium, Kumasi
Referee: Younoussa Tawel Camara (Guinea)

Ghana won 2–1 on aggregate.

22 March 2023
19:00 UTC+0

Senegal	3–1	Mali
M. Camara 14'; Dramé 27'; Sima 65' (pen.)	Report	Diarra 60'

Diamniadio Olympic Stadium, Dakar
Referee: Abdulsalam Kassim (Nigeria)
28 March 2023
18:00 UTC+0

Mali	3–0	Senegal
Diallo 61'; Doumbia 66'; Sangare 72' (pen.)	Report

Stade du 26 Mars, Bamako

Mali won 4–3 on aggregate.

25 March 2023
15:30 UTC+1

Gabon	1–0	Cameroon
Moussango 13'	Report

Stade de Franceville, Franceville
28 March 2023
16:00 UTC+1

Cameroon	1–0	Gabon
Eto'o 25'	Report
Penalties
	6–7

Ahmadou Ahidjo Stadium, Yaoundé

Gabon won 7–6 on penalties after a 1–1 draw on aggregate.

== Qualified teams ==
The following eight teams qualified for the 2023 U-23 Africa Cup of Nations.

Team	Qualified on	Previous U-23 Africa Cup of Nations appearances^{1}
Morocco (hosts)	7 July 2022	1 (2011)
Egypt	26 March 2023	3 (2011, 2015, **2019**)
Congo	27 March 2023	0 (debut)
Gabon	28 March 2023	1 (**2011**)
Ghana	28 March 2023	1 (2019)
Guinea	28 March 2023	0 (debut)
Mali	28 March 2023	2 (2015, 2019)
Niger	28 March 2023	0 (debut)

^{1} Bold indicates champions for that year. Italic indicates hosts for that year.

== Goalscorers ==
There were 133 goals scored in 60 matches, for an average of 2.22 goals per match.

4 goals

- (Madagascar) Arnaud Randrianantenaina
- (Niger) Kairou Amoustapha

3 goals

- (Algeria) Chemseddine Bekkouche
- (Ghana) Daniel Afriyie
- (Madagascar) El Hadari Raheriniaina

2 goals

- (Algeria) Mohamed Islam Belkhir
- (Angola) Bito
- (Angola) Capita
- (Angola) Zini
- (Cameroon) Ivan Ndjantou
- (Republic of the Congo) Gloire Bassinga
- (Democratic Republic of the Congo) Jonathan Ikangalombo
- (Gabon) Emmanuel Ovono
- (Ghana) Abdul Fatawu Issahaku
- (Guinea-Bissau) Mamadi Camará
- (Libya) Nour al-Din Al-Qulaib
- (Mozambique) Zidane Sidat
- (Niger) Salam Boulhassane
- (Nigeria) Success Makanjuola
- (Rwanda) Clément Niyigena
- (Tanzania) Ally Msengi
- (Togo) Kevin Laba

1 goal

- (Angola) Benarfa
- (Angola) Benvindo Afonso
- (Angola) Picas
- (Angola) Melono Dala
- (Benin) Boladji Abdou
- (Benin) Gaël Dassi
- (Benin) Soumaïla Hounkpè
- (Botswana) Tawana Mbakile
- (Botswana) Tefo Molefe
- (Burkina Faso) Kouamé Botué
- (Burkina Faso) Cyrille Dao
- (Cameroon) Etienne Eto'o
- (Cameroon) Djawal Kaiba
- (Republic of the Congo) Love Bissila
- (Democratic Republic of the Congo) John Bakata
- (Democratic Republic of the Congo) Akram Bongonga
- (Democratic Republic of the Congo) Gloire Mujaya
- (Democratic Republic of the Congo) Patient Mwamba
- (Egypt) Ibrahim Adel
- (Egypt) Abdelrahman Atef
- (Egypt) Osama Faisal
- (Eswatini) Bongiswa Dlamini
- (Eswatini) Neliswa Dlamini
- (Eswatini) Sambulo Simelane
- (Gabon) Ben Kabinambele
- (Gabon) Hants Mbenga
- (Gabon) Jeremie Moussango
- (Gabon) Yohann Nkoghe
- (The Gambia) Mamadou Bâ
- (The Gambia) Momodou Bojang
- (Ghana) Sylvester Simba
- (Guinea) Algassime Bah
- (Guinea) Alseny Soumah
- (Ivory Coast) Seydou Traoré
- (Libya) Fadel Salama
- (Libya) Ali Yousef
- (Madagascar) Joël Jinidy
- (Madagascar) Kalvin Paul
- (Madagascar) Lalane Randrianandrasana
- (Madagascar) Claude Ratsimbazafy
- (Mali) Hamidou Diallo
- (Mali) Thiemoko Diarra
- (Mali) Ahmed Diomandé
- (Mali) Kamory Doumbia
- (Mali) Mamadou Sangare
- (Mali) Kalifa Traoré
- (Mauritania) Sidi Ahmed Mohamed El Abd
- (Mauritius) David Aristide
- (Mozambique) Gaby
- (Mozambique) Ivan
- (Mozambique) Gianluca Lorenzoni
- (Mozambique) Horácio Vilanculos
- (Namibia) Gonzales Tsuseb
- (Niger) Abdoul Rachid Amoumane
- (Nigeria) Abiodun Ogunniyi
- (Rwanda) Ashraf Kamanzi
- (Rwanda) Prince Rudasingwa
- (Senegal) Mamadou Lamine Camara
- (Senegal) Ibrahima Dramé
- (Senegal) Abdallah Sima
- (Seychelles) Affandi Aboudou
- (Sierra Leone) Alie Conteh
- (South Africa) Ashley Cupido
- (South Africa) Thapelo Maseko
- (South Africa) Antonio van Wyk
- (South Sudan) Rahan Angier
- (South Sudan) Dani Lual
- (South Sudan) Joseph Malish
- (Sudan) Ali Abdalah
- (Sudan) John Manu
- (Sudan) Al-Jezoli Nouh
- (Tanzania) Kelvin John
- (Tanzania) Abdul Sopu
- (Togo) Bruno Avotor
- (Togo) Aboudou Wetchire
- (Tunisia) Adem Garreb
- (Tunisia) Hamdi Labidi
- (Zambia) Joshua Mutale
- (Zambia) Andrew Phiri

1 own goal

- (Benin) Pamphile Winsavi (against Sudan)
- (Mali) Yoro Mamadou Diaby (against Rwanda)
- (Seychelles) Graham Fauré (against Madagascar)
