= Baggio Rakotoarisoa =

Malagasy footballer

Personal information
- Full name: Romario Baggio Rakotoarisoa
- Date of birth: 24 January 1996 (age 30)
- Place of birth: Antananarivo, Madagascar
- Height: 1.75 m (5 ft 9 in)
- Position: Striker

Team information
- Current team: Fosa Juniors

Senior career*
Years	Team	Apps	(Gls)
2016–	Fosa Juniors		

International career^{‡}
2017–	Madagascar	16	(0)
- * Club domestic league appearances and goals as of 12:39, 19 November 2019 (UTC) ‡ National team caps and goals as of 12:39, 19 November 2019 (UTC)

Romario Baggio Rakotoarisoa (born 24 January 1996) is a Malagasy international footballer who plays for Fosa Juniors, as a striker.

== Career ==
Born in Antananarivo, he has played club football for Fosa Juniors.

He made his international debut for Madagascar in 2017.
