= Randrianasolo =

Randrianasolo is a Malagasy surname.

== People ==
- Joseph Ignace Randrianasolo (1947 – 2010), Roman Catholic bishop of Mahajanga, Madagascar
- Milson Randrianasolo (born 1957), Malagasy boxer
- Jean Dieu-Donné Randrianasolo (born 1989), Malagasy international footballer
- Yann Randrianasolo (born 1994), French athlete specialising in the long jump
