= Arnaud Randrianantenaina =

Malagasy footballer

Personal information
- Date of birth: 3 January 2001 (age 25)
- Place of birth: Antananarivo, Madagascar
- Height: 1.80 m (5 ft 11 in)
- Position: Winger

Team information
- Current team: Gloria Bistrița
- Number: 19

Senior career*
Years	Team	Apps	(Gls)
2017	Ajesaia		
2018–2020	CNaPS Sport		
2021–2022	JS Saint-Pierroise	12	(2)
2022–2026	El Gouna	70	(5)
2026–	Gloria Bistrița	6	(0)

International career^{‡}
2019–2020	Madagascar U20		
2019–	Madagascar	31	(5)
- * Club domestic league appearances and goals as of 1 November 2026 ‡ National team caps and goals as of 1 June 2026

Arnaud Randrianantenaina (born 3 January 2001) is a Malagasy professional footballer who plays as a winger for Liga II club Gloria Bistrița and the Madagascar national team.

== Club career ==
Randrianantenaina spent 2017 at Ajesaia before he was recruited by the CNaPS Sport coaching staff, who brought him to the team for the 2018 season at the age of 17. That year, he helped them to a league title and experienced continental football by playing in the qualifying rounds of the 2018–19 CAF Champions League against Zimbabwean champions F.C. Platinum.

Randrianantenaina trialled with French side Grenoble Foot 38 in January 2020, but "administrative issues" prevented the deal from finalizing on the eve of the winter transfer window. Ajesaia and CNaPS Sport had a dispute over his rights, and neither team signed off on the deal he was offered. He later signed with JS Saint-Pierroise of the Réunion Premier League in February 2021.

After one season in Réunion, Randrianantenaina was signed by Egyptian Premier League side El Gouna in early 2022.

== International career ==
=== Youth ===
Randrianantenaina represented the national under-20 team at the 2019 COSAFA U-20 Cup and the 2020 Arab Cup U-20, scoring prolifically in both competitions.

=== Senior ===
Randrianantenaina made his senior international debut on 28 July 2019, providing the lone goal in their 1–0 home victory over Mozambique in the first leg of their 2020 African Nations Championship qualification tie. He scored the game-winner in stoppage time after coming on as a second-half substitute for Jean-Claude Marobe. A week later in the away leg, he scored again just a few minutes after coming on for Lovanirina Randriamiharisoa. Madagascar lost 3–2 but advanced on away goals. Randrianantenaina played in both legs against Namibia in the next round, but they did not progress. He also appeared in a 2021 Africa Cup of Nations qualifier.

== Career statistics ==
=== International ===
As of 1 June 2026

Appearances and goals by national team and year
National team	Year	Apps	Goals
Madagascar
Madagascar	2019	5	2
Madagascar	2021	2	0
Madagascar	2022	2	0
Madagascar	2023	3	0
Madagascar	2024	8	0
Madagascar	2025	8	2
Madagascar	2026	3	1
Total		31	5

=== International goals ===
Scores and results list Madagascar's goal tally first.

Goal	Date	Venue	Opponent	Score	Result	Competition
1.	28 July 2019	Mahamasina Municipal Stadium, Antananarivo, Madagascar	Mozambique	1–0	1–0	2020 African Nations Championship qualification
2.	4 August 2019	Estádio do Zimpeto, Maputo, Mozambique	Mozambique	1–3	2–3	2020 African Nations Championship qualification
3.	19 March 2025	Larbi Zaouli Stadium, Casablanca, Morocco	Central African Republic	3–1	4–1	2026 FIFA World Cup qualification
4.	4 September 2025	Larbi Zaouli Stadium, Casablanca, Morocco	Central African Republic	2–0	2–0	2026 FIFA World Cup qualification
5.	28 March 2026	Calista Sports Center, Belek, Turkey	Kyrgyzstan	1–0	5–2	Friendly

== Honours ==
=== Club ===
CNaPS Sport

- Malagasy Pro League: 2018

El Gouna

- Egyptian Second Division: 2022–23
