= 2019 THB Champions League =

Madagascar Pro League
- Season: 2019
- Dates: 8 March 2019 - 16 June 2019
- Champions: Fosa Juniors
- Promoted: Tia Kitra, Club Mananara and COSFA Division 2
- Matches played: 106
- Goals scored: 278 (2.62 per match)
- Average goals/game: 2.62
- Biggest home win: Fosa Juniors FC 8-0 JSA Antalaha - March 11, 2019 + Zanak'Ala FC 8-0 Jofama FC Ambositra - March 10, 2019
- Biggest away win: JSA Antalaha 0-15 Ajesaia - March 13, 2019

The 2019 THB Champions League is the 53rd season of the THB Champions League, the top-tier football league in Madagascar. The season started on 8 March 2019 and ended on 16 June 2019.

== Qualification ==
All teams in Madagascar played its regional leagues. The champions of all regional leagues and the runner-ups of Itasy who provided the 2018 winners and Analamanga who provided the 2018 cup winners qualified to the tournament. The runner-ups of the leagues are COSFA (Analamanga) and AS JET Mada (Itasy). 3FB Betsiboka (Betsiboka) and AJSM (Melaky) were the only teams that withdrew in the First phase.

Without the 2 teams that withdrew, 22 teams qualified to the tournament.

== Format ==
=== First phase ===
In the First phase, 24 teams would be separated in 4 groups of 6 teams. In the groups, all teams played against each other once, then the first 2 teams qualify to the Ligue des Champions 1st Division, next 3 teams qualify to Ligue des Champions 2nd Division and the last place gets eliminated from both divisions.

==== Withdrawal ====
3FB Betsiboka and AJSM withdrew. That means Group A and B would have 5 teams, while the remaining has 6. That also means that the league was played with 22 teams, 2 less teams than in the format.

=== Division 1 ===
The first and second team from each group in the First phase qualify to the Ligue des Champions first division. 8 teams participate in the division. All teams play against each other once, then the team with the most points becomes the champion of Madagascar.

=== Division 2 ===
The third, fourth and fiveth team from each group in the First phase qualify to the second division. 12 teams participate in the division. The 12 teams would be separated in 2 groups of 6 teams. In the groups, all teams played against each other once, then the first 2 teams on the group qualify to the Poule des As. In the Poule des As, all teams would play against each other twice (home and away), then the team with the most points becomes champions of the second division of Madagascar and gets promoted to the Ligue des Champions First Division in the 2019/20 season.

== First phase ==
- M = Matches
- W = Wins
- D = Draws
- L = Loses
- FG = Favor goals
- OG = Own goals
- GD = Goal difference
- P = Points

=== Group A ===
X	Team	M	W	D	L	FG	OG	GD	P	Qualification
1	Fosa Juniors FC (Boeny)	4	4	0	0	20	1	+19	12	Division 1
2	Ajesaia (Bongolava)	4	2	1	1	18	5	+13	7	Division 1
3	JSMS (Diana)	4	1	2	1	8	10	-2	5	Division 2
4	TAM Port Bergé (Sofia)	4	1	1	2	9	6	+3	4	Division 2
5	JS Antalaha (Sava)	4	0	0	4	3	36	-33	0	Division 2
-	3FB (Betsiboka)	Withdrew								

=== Group B ===
X	Team	M	W	D	L	FG	OG	GD	P	Qualification
1	AS Adema (Analamanga)	4	3	1	0	4	1	+3	10	Division 1
2	AS JET Mada (Itasy)	4	2	2	0	3	1	+2	8	Division 1
3	Tia Kitra (Antsiranana)	4	2	0	2	5	4	+1	6	Division 2
4	Club M (Analanjirofo)	4	1	0	3	3	3	0	3	Division 2
5	Voromaherin'Alaotra (Alaotra Mangoro)	4	0	1	3	2	8	-6	1	Division 2
-	AJSM Maintirano (Melaky)	Withdrew								

=== Group C ===
This was the only group without draws.

X	Team	M	W	D	L	FG	OG	GD	P	Qualification
1	Zanak'Ala FC (Haute Matsiara)	5	5	0	0	21	2	+19	15	Division 1
2	CNaPS Sport (Itasy)	5	4	0	1	18	4	+14	12	Division 1
3	FC Vakinankaratra (Vakinankaratra)	5	3	0	2	10	8	+2	9	Division 2
4	Jofama FC Ambositra (Amoron'Imania)	5	2	0	3	6	16	-10	6	Division 2
5	AS Fitafa (Atsimo-Atsinanana)	5	1	0	4	5	15	-10	3	Division 2
6	FC Grand Sud Est (Menabe)	5	0	0	5	2	17	-15	0	Eliminated

=== Group D ===
X	Team	M	W	D	L	FG	OG	GD	P	Qualification
1	FCA Ilakaka (Ihorombe)	5	3	2	0	7	2	+5	11	Division 1
2	3FB Toliara (Atsimo Andrefana)	5	3	1	1	9	3	+6	10	Division 1
3	COSFA (Analamanga)	5	2	2	1	12	3	+9	8	Division 2
4	DCF Tôlanaro (Anosy)	5	2	2	1	5	6	-1	8	Division 2
5	VFM Manakara (V7V)	5	1	1	3	5	9	-4	4	Division 2
6	AS Rohondroho (Androy)	5	0	0	5	2	17	-15	0	Eliminated

== Division 1 ==
X	Team	M	W	D	L	FG	OG	GD	P	Finish
1	Fosa Juniors FC (Boeny)	7	5	2	0	15	6	+9	17	Champions
2	AS Adema (Analamanga)	7	3	3	1	8	6	+2	12	
3	CNaPS Sport (Itasy)	7	3	2	2	11	5	+6	11	
4	Zanak'Ala FC (Haute Matsiatra)	7	3	1	3	8	9	-1	10	
5	3FB Toliara (Atsimo Andrefana)	7	3	0	4	5	6	-1	9	
6	AS JET Mada (Itasy)	7	1	4	2	8	7	+1	7	
7	FCA Ilakaka (Ihorombe)	7	1	3	3	5	13	-8	6	
8	Ajesaia (Bongolava)	7	0	3	4	2	10	-8	3	

== Division 2 ==
=== First Stage ===
==== Group A ====
X	Team	M	W	D	L	FG	OG	GD	P	Qualification
1	TAM Port Bergé (Sofia)	2	2	0	0	7	0	+7	6	Eliminated
2	Tia Kitra (Atsinanana)	2	0	1	1	1	4	-3	1	Poule des As
3	Club Mananara (Analanjirofo)	2	0	1	1	1	5	-4	1	Poule des As
-	JSA Antalaha (Sava)	Apparently did not enter								
-	JSMS (Diana)	Apparently did not enter								
-	Voromaherin'Alaotra (Alaotra-Mangoro)	Apparently did not enter								

It is unclear why Club M entered Poule des As instead of TAM Port Bergé; possibly their match on Apr 14 was later awarded to Club M

==== Group B ====
X	Team	M	W	D	L	FG	OG	GD	P	Qualification
1	COSFA (Analamanga)	2	2	0	0	7	0	+7	6	Poule des As
2	FC Vakinankaratra (Vakinankaratra)	2	0	1	1	1	4	-3	1	Poule des As
3	DCF Tôlanaro (Anosy)	2	0	1	1	1	5	-4	1	Eliminated
-	AS Fitafa (Atsimo-Atsinanana)	Apparently did not enter								
-	Jofama FC Ambositra (Amoron'Imania)	Apparently did not enter								
-	VFM Manakara (V7V)	Apparently did not enter								

=== Poule des As ===
X	Team	M	W	D	L	FG	OG	GD	P	Finish + Qualification
1	Tia Kitra (Atsinanana)	6	3	1	2	7	5	+2	10	Champions + 2019/20 Division 1
2	Club Mananara (Analanjirofo)	6	3	1	2	4	3	+1	10	2019/20 Division 1
3	COSFA (Analamanga)	6	2	3	1	7	5	+2	9	2019/20 Division 1
4	FC Vakinankaratra (Vakinankaratra)	6	1	1	4	3	8	-5	4	

Eventually Club Mananara and COSFA were also promoted, along with Elgeco Plus (Antananarivo, Analamanga)

== Stadiums ==
Team	Location	Stadium	Capacity
Fosa Juniors Elite FC	Boeny		
AS Adema	Analamanga	Mahamasina Municipal Stadium	40,880
CNaPS Sport	Itasy	Stade Municipal de Toamasina	2,500
Zanak'Ala FC	Haute Matsiatra		
3FB Toliara	Atsimo Andrefana		
AS JET Mada	Itasy	Stade Municipal de Toamasina	2,500
FCA Ilakaka	Ihorombe		
Ajesaia	Bongolava	Mahamasina Municipal Stadium	40,880

== Attendances ==
#	Football club	Average attendance
1	Fosa Juniors	1,243
2	AS ADEMA	1,102
3	CNaPS Sport	974
4	Zanak'Ala FC	897
5	3FB Toliara	832
6	AS JET Mada	684
7	FCA Ilakaka	612
8	Ajesaia	529
