= Hesbon Rutonesha =

Rwandan football player

Hesbon
Personal information
- Full name: Hesbon Rutonesha
- Date of birth: 24 February 2002 (age 24)
- Place of birth: Rwanda
- Height: 1.95 m (6 ft 5 in)
- Position: Defensive midfielder

Youth career
- 2017-2019: Isonga football Academy

Senior career*
Years	Team	Apps	(Gls)
2019–2023	Gorilla FC Rwanda	38	(5)
2023–2024	Police FC	30	(0)

International career
2019	Rwanda national football team U-17	4	(1)
2022	Rwanda national football team U-23	2	(0)
- * Club domestic league appearances and goals

Hesbon Rutonesha (born 24 February 2002) is a Rwandan professional footballer as a Midfielder, who played for the Rwandan national team U-17 and U-23.

== Career ==
=== Junior ===
2017-2019 Isonga F.C.

=== Senior ===
2019-2023 Gorilla FC Rwanda

2023-2024 Police F.C. (Rwanda)

=== Club ===
Jan 2023, Hesbon Rutonesha joined Rwandan club Police F.C. (Rwanda).

=== International ===
He debuted international friendly game on 5 / 04 / 2019 and scored first goal against Tanzania in a 3-3 draw.

At the 2023, he was in selected players to play 2023 U-23 Africa Cup of Nations qualification with Libya and Mali.

== Career statistics ==
International statistics
Date	Venue	Opponent	Score	Result	Competition
5/04/2019	Kigali Pele Stadium	Tanzania U-17	1-0	3-3	International Friendly game

== Honours ==
- Peace cup 2024
- Heroes cup 2024
