= Mario Bakary =

Malagasy footballer

Personal information
- Full name: Mario Bakary
- Date of birth: 21 July 1988 (age 38)
- Place of birth: Antsiranana, Madagascar
- Height: 1.80 m (5 ft 11 in)
- Positions: Left back; left midfielder

Team information
- Current team: Fleury 91

Senior career*
Years	Team	Apps	(Gls)
2014–2015	Elgeco Plus		
2015–2019	Fosa Juniors		
2019	La Tamponnaise		
2020–	Fleury 91	2	(0)

International career
2016–2019	Madagascar	13	(0)
- * Club domestic league appearances and goals

Mario Bakary (born 21 July 1988) is a Malagasy footballer who plays as left back but also plays as a left midfielder on occasions. He plays for the national team and French club FC Fleury 91.
