= 2016 THB Champions League =

THB Champions League
- Season: 2016
- Champions: CNaPS Sport

The 2016 THB Champions League was the top level football competition in Madagascar. It was played from 12 August to 8 December 2016.

== First phase ==
=== Vondrona A ===
1.SOM-Fosa Juniors FC (Boeny)            5   4  0  1  26- 4  12       Qualified
2.FC Joel (Sava)                         5   4  0  1  14- 5  12       Qualified
3.RTS-Jet Mada (Itasy)                   5   3  1  1  14- 8  10       Qualified
- - - - - - - - - - - - - - - - - - - - - - - - - - - - - - - -
4.USSK Ambanja (Diana)                   5   2  1  2  10-12   7
5.TAM Port Bergé (Sofia)                5   1  0  4   9-21   3
6.Espoir Manerinerina (Betsiboka)        5   0  0  5   1-24   0

=== Vondrona B ===
1.Ajesaia (Bongolava)                    5   3  2  0   5- 1  11       Qualified
2.ASSM Elgeco Plus (Analamanga) 5   3  1  1   7- 3  10       Qualified
3.FC Fitama (Analanjirofo)               5   2  2  1   3- 2   8       Qualified
- - - - - - - - - - - - - - - - - - - - - - - - - - - - - - - -
4.FC Otiv (Alaotra Mangoro)              5   1  2  2   4- 6   5
5.AS Fortior de la Côte Est (Atsinanana)    5   1  1  3   4- 7   4
6.FC 3M (Menabe)                         5   1  0  4   2- 6   3

=== Vondrona C ===
1.CNaPS Sports (Itasy)                   5   4  1  0  28- 1  13       Qualified
2.Tana FC Formation (Analamanga)            5   3  2  0  22- 5  11       Qualified
3.FC Vakinankaratra (Vakinankaratra)     5   3  1  1  15- 4  10       Qualified
- - - - - - - - - - - - - - - - - - - - - - - - - - - - - - - -
4.AJS Melaky (Melaky)                    5   1  1  3   5-24   4
5.FC Black Star (V7V)                    5   1  0  4   5-14   3

=== Vondrona D ===
1.Zanak'Ala FC (Haute Matsiatra)         5   4  0  1  15- 4  12       Qualified
2.DCF Fort Dauphin (Anosy)               5   3  1  1   9- 2  10       Qualified
3.AS Comato (Ihorombe)                   5   2  1  2   9- 4   7       Qualified
- - - - - - - - - - - - - - - - - - - - - - - - - - - - - - - -
4.ASJF Capricorne (Atsimo Andrefana)     5   2  1  2   8- 6   7
5.FC Jocker (Atsimo Atsinanana)          5   2  1  2   5- 9   7
6.FC Real Tsihombey (Androy)             5   0  0  5   3-24   0

== Second phase ==
=== Vondrona 1 ===
1.SOM-Fosa Juniors FC (Boeny)            4   4  0  0  10- 1  12       Qualified
2.ASSM Elgeco Plus (Analamanga) 4   2  1  1  11- 5   7       Qualified
- - - - - - - - - - - - - - - - - - - - - - - - - - - - - - - -
3.RTS-Jet Mada (Itasy)                   4   2  1  1   6- 4   7
4.Ajesaia (Bongolava)                    4   1  0  3   6- 7   3
5.FC Fitama (Analanjirofo)               4   0  0  4   1-17   0
-.FC Joel (Sava)                         withdrew; all results annulled;

=== Vondrona 2 ===
1.CNaPS Sports (Itasy)                   5   3  2  0  12- 1  11       Qualified
2.Zanak'Ala FC (Haute Matsiatra)         5   3  2  0   6- 2  11       Qualified
- - - - - - - - - - - - - - - - - - - - - - - - - - - - - - - -
3.Tana Formation (Analamanga)            5   3  1  1  16- 3  10
4.FC Vakinankaratra (Vakinankaratra)     5   2  1  2   4- 7   7
5.DCF Fort Dauphin (Anosy)               5   1  0  4   3-17   3
6.AS Comato (Ihorombe)                   5   0  0  5   3-14   0

== Final phase ==
1.CNaPS Sports (Itasy)                   6   5  0  1  11- 4  15       Champions
2.ASSM Elgeco Plus (Analamanga) 6   3  2  1   8- 7  11
3.SOM-Fosa Juniors FC (Boeny)            6   0  3  3   7-10   3
4.Zanak'Ala FC (Haute Matsiatra)         6   0  3  3   4- 9   3
