= El Hadary Raheriniaina =

Malagasy footballer (born 2006)

Personal information
- Full name: Ahmad El Hadary Ylan Clauvis Raheriniaina
- Date of birth: 19 August 2006 (age 20)
- Place of birth: Mahajanga, Madagascar
- Height: 1.75 m (5 ft 9 in)
- Position: Forward

Team information
- Current team: Nancy (on loan from Paris FC)
- Number: 12

Youth career
- 2017–2021: Ajesaia
- 2024–2025: Paris FC

Senior career*
| Years | Team | Apps | (Gls) |
| 2021–2022 | Ajesaia | | |
| 2022–2024 | St Michel United | | |
| 2025– | Paris FC | 0 | (0) |
| 2025–2026 | → Valenciennes (loan) | 20 | (3) |
| 2026– | → Nancy (loan) | 2 | (0) |

International career^{‡}
| 2023– | Madagascar | 25 | (4) |
- * Club domestic league appearances and goals ‡ National team caps and goals as of 19 August 2026

Ahmad El Hadary Ylan Clauvis Raheriniaina, known as El Hadary Raheriniaina or Ylan El Hadary (born 19 August 2006) is a Malagasy professional footballer who plays as a forward for French Ligue 2 club Nancy on loan from Paris FC, and the Madagascar national team.

== Club career ==
Raheriniaina began his career with local club Ajesaia, joining the club's under-15 side in 2017. He was named the Best Young Player of the Malagasy Pro League following the 2021/2022 season. He then moved to St Michel United of the Seychelles Premier League. He remained with the club through the 2024 season, attracting the attention of European scouts with his performances. He was released from the club in October 2024 to pursue opportunities in Europe. In November 2024, it was announced that Raheriniaina had joined Paris FC in France's Ligue 2. He initially joined up with the club's reserve side following the weeks-long trial.

== International career ==
Raheriniaina was called up to the national under-23 team in 2022 for a 2023 U-23 Africa Cup of Nations qualification series against the Seychelles. He went on to score one goal in Madagascar's opening 5–0 victory and a brace in the 7–1 victory in the second leg. He made his senior international debut on 24 August 2023 in a 2023 Indian Ocean Island Games match against the Seychelles. He went on to score two goals against Comoros in the semi-finals of the competition.

== Career statistics ==
=== International ===
As of match played 1 June 2026

Appearances and goals by national team and year
| National team | Year | Apps | Goals |
|---|---|---|---|
| Madagascar | 2023 | 8 | 2 |
| Madagascar | 2024 | 8 | 0 |
| Madagascar | 2025 | 7 | 2 |
| Madagascar | 2026 | 2 | 0 |
| Total | | 25 | 4 |

Scores and results list Madagascar's goal tally first, score column indicates score after each Raheriniaina goal.

List of international goals scored by El Hadary Raheriniaina
| No. | Date | Venue | Opponent | Score | Result | Competition |
|---|---|---|---|---|---|---|
| 1 | 31 August 2023 | Mahamasina Municipal Stadium, Antananarivo, Madagascar | Comoros | 1–0 | 4–2 | 2023 Indian Ocean Island Games |
| 2 | 31 August 2023 | Mahamasina Municipal Stadium, Antananarivo, Madagascar | Comoros | 3–1 | 4–2 | 2023 Indian Ocean Island Games |
| 3 | 8 June 2025 | Stade de la Source, Orléans, France | DR Congo | 1–3 | 1–3 | Friendly |
| 4 | 8 October 2025 | Felix Houphouet Boigny Stadium, Abidjan, Ivory Coast | Comoros | 2–0 | 2–1 | 2026 FIFA World Cup qualification |

== Personal ==
Raheriniaina is a relative of Anicet Abel, former captain of the Madagascar national team and first and currently only player from Madagascar to appear in the UEFA Champions League.
