= 2018 Coupe de Madagascar =

Tournament details
- Country: Madagascar

Final positions
- Champions: ASSM Elgeco Plus

The 2018 Coupe de Madagascar is the 2018 edition of the Coupe de Madagascar, the knockout football competition of Madagascar.

In the final on 7 October 2018, ASSM Elgeco Plus defeated AS Adema.

== See also ==
- 2018 THB Champions League
