= 2020 Arab Cup U-20 =

كأس العرب للمنتخبات تحت 20 سنة 2020

Tournament details
- Host country: Saudi Arabia
- Dates: 17 February – 4 March
- Teams: 16 (from 2 confederations)
- Venues: 4 (in 3 host cities)

Final positions
- Champions: Senegal (1st title)
- Runners-up: Tunisia

Tournament statistics
- Matches played: 31
- Goals scored: 96 (3.1 per match)
- Top scorer: (Senegal) Samba Diallo (5 goals)

The 2020 Arab Cup U-20 was the sixth edition of the Arab Cup U-20 organised by the Union of Arab Football Associations (UAFA) for the men's under-20 national teams of the Arab world. It is the first tournament played in nearly eight years. The competition took place in Saudi Arabia between 17 February and 4 March. It was held in Dammam, Khobar and Riyadh.

== Teams ==
=== Participating teams ===
Africa

- Algeria
- Djibouti
- Egypt
- Libya
- Mauritania
- Morocco
- Sudan
- Tunisia

Asia

- Bahrain
- Iraq
- Kuwait
- Palestine
- Saudi Arabia (hosts)
- United Arab Emirates

Invited

- Madagascar
- Senegal

Withdrew

- Comoros
- Qatar

Did not enter

- Jordan
- Lebanon
- Oman
- Somalia
- Syria
- Yemen

== Match officials ==
Below the list of the referees and the assistant referees of the tournament

=== Referees ===
CAF - Africa

- Lotfi Bekouassa (Algeria)
- Saddam Houssein Mansour (Djibouti)
- Ahmed El Ghandour (Egypt)
- Abdulwahid Huraywidah (Libya)
- Mathioro Diabel (Mauritania)
- Adil Zourak (Morocco)
- Sabri Mohammed Fadul (Sudan)
- Mehrez Melki (Tunisia)

AFC - Asia

- Mohammed Bunafoor Juma (Bahrain)
- Mohammed Wathik Al-Baag (Iraq)
- Murad Al Zawahreh (Jordan)
- Saad Al-Fadhli Kalefah (Kuwait)
- Mohamad Darwich (Lebanon)
- Sameh Al-Qassas (Palestine)
- Saoud Al-Adba (Qatar)
- (Saudi Arabia) Faisal Al-Balawi (Saudi Arabia)
- (United Arab Emirates) Ahmed Eisa Darwish (United Arab Emirates)

=== Assistant referees ===
CAF - Africa

- Abbes Akram Zerhouni (Algeria)
- Liban Abdirazack Ahmed (Djibouti)
- Samir Gamal Saad Mohamed (Egypt)
- Basm Saef El-Naser (Libya)
- Mohamed Mahmoud Youssouf (Mauritania)
- Hicham Ait Abbou (Morocco)
- Omer Hamid Ahmed (Sudan)
- Mohamed Bakir (Tunisia)

AFC - Asia

- Salman Talasi (Bahrain)
- Akram Ali Jabbar (Iraq)
- Ahmad Abbas (Kuwait)
- Farooq Assi (Palestine)
- Ramzan Al-Naemi (Qatar)
- (Saudi Arabia) Faisal Al-Qahtani (Saudi Arabia)
- Oqubah Al-Haweij (Syria)
- (United Arab Emirates) Ali Al-Nuaimi (United Arab Emirates)

== Draw ==
The group stage draw was made on 20 January 2020. The 16 teams were drawn into four groups.

== Venues ==
Riyadh	Riyadh	2020 Arab Cup U-20 is located in Saudi Arabia
Prince Turki bin Abdul Aziz Stadium	Prince Faisal bin Fahd Stadium	2020 Arab Cup U-20 is located in Saudi Arabia
Capacity: 15,000	Capacity: 22,500	2020 Arab Cup U-20 is located in Saudi Arabia
24.6477°N 46.5508°E	24.6625°N 46.7397°E	2020 Arab Cup U-20 is located in Saudi Arabia
Dammam	Khobar	2020 Arab Cup U-20 is located in Saudi Arabia
Prince Mohamed bin Fahd Stadium	Prince Saud bin Jalawi Stadium	2020 Arab Cup U-20 is located in Saudi Arabia
Capacity: 36,000	Capacity: 20,100	2020 Arab Cup U-20 is located in Saudi Arabia
26.4272°N 50.1140°E	26.3699°N 50.2052°E	2020 Arab Cup U-20 is located in Saudi Arabia

== Squads ==
Players born on or after 1 January 2000 were eligible to compete.

== Group stage ==
The top two teams of each group advanced to the quarter-finals.

All times are local, AST (UTC+3).

=== Group A ===
Pos	Team	Pld	W	D	L	GF	GA	GD	Pts	Qualification
1	Tunisia	3	2	1	0	4	2	+2	7	Knockout stage
2	Iraq	3	1	1	1	3	2	+1	4	Knockout stage
3	Mauritania	3	1	0	2	2	3	−1	3	
4	Kuwait	3	0	2	1	1	3	−2	2	

Source: Soccerway
Rules for classification: Group stage tiebreakers
17 February 2020
14:45

Iraq	1–2	Tunisia
Mohamed 42'		Mimouni 70'; Sghaier 89'

Prince Saud bin Jalawi Stadium, Khobar
Referee: Murad Al Zawahreh (Jordan)
17 February 2020
17:50

Mauritania	2–0	Kuwait
Warr 26', 64'

Prince Saud bin Jalawi Stadium, Khobar
Referee: Mohammed Bunafoor Juma (Bahrain)

20 February 2020
14:45

Kuwait	0–0	Iraq

Prince Saud bin Jalawi Stadium, Khobar
Referee: Ahmed El Ghandour (Egypt)
20 February 2020
17:50

Mauritania	0–1	Tunisia
		Habassi 86'

Prince Saud bin Jalawi Stadium, Khobar
Referee: Sabri Mohammed Fadul (Sudan)

23 February 2020
15:30

Iraq	2–0	Mauritania
Bilal 23' (o.g.); Fadhil 85'

Prince Saud bin Jalawi Stadium, Khobar
Referee: Ahmed Eisa Darwish (United Arab Emirates)
23 February 2020
15:30

Tunisia	1–1	Kuwait
Mimouni 36' (pen.)		Marzouk 83'

Prince Mohamed bin Fahd Stadium, Dammam
Referee: Adil Zourak (Morocco)

=== Group B ===
Pos	Team	Pld	W	D	L	GF	GA	GD	Pts	Qualification
1	Morocco	3	3	0	0	12	3	+9	9	Knockout stage
2	Bahrain	3	2	0	1	9	9	0	6	Knockout stage
3	Madagascar	3	1	0	2	9	10	−1	3	
4	Djibouti	3	0	0	3	4	12	−8	0	

Source: Soccerway
Rules for classification: Group stage tiebreakers
17 February 2020
14:45

Morocco	4–2	Bahrain
Sahel 26'; Lahtimi 39'; El Azzouzi 70'; Amrani 89'		Alaoui 56'; Salem 63' (pen.)

Prince Turki bin Abdul Aziz Stadium, Riyadh
Referee: Saad Al-Fadhli Kalefah (Kuwait)
17 February 2020
18:00

Madagascar	4–3	Djibouti
Menakely 20', 33', 45'; Randrianantenaina 25'		Mohamed 19'; Kamel 23'; Ali 63'

Prince Turki bin Abdul Aziz Stadium, Riyadh
Referee: Sameh Al-Qassas (Palestine)

20 February 2020
14:45

Djibouti	0–6	Morocco
		Abida 7'; Gharib 33'; El Achbili 50'; El Azzouzi 68'; Ezzalzouli 71', 90+1'

Prince Turki bin Abdul Aziz Stadium, Riyadh
Referee: Mehrez Melki (Tunisia)
20 February 2020
18:00

Madagascar	4–5	Bahrain
Randrianantenaina 31', 55'; Nomenjanahary 34'; Menakely 60'		Salem 23', 68'; Issa 27'; Harouna 42'; Bader 65'

Prince Turki bin Abdul Aziz Stadium, Riyadh
Referee: Mathioro Diabel (Mauritania)

23 February 2020
15:30

Morocco	2–1	Madagascar
Amrani 51'; El Moubarek 86' (pen.)		Randrianantenaina 76'

Prince Turki bin Abdul Aziz Stadium, Riyadh
Referee: Saoud Al-Adba (Qatar)
23 February 2020
15:30

Bahrain	2–1	Djibouti
Alaoui 33'; Abdul Aziz 40'		Ibrahim 60'

Prince Faisal bin Fahd Stadium, Riyadh
Referee: Mohammed Wathik Al-Baag (Iraq)

=== Group C ===
Pos	Team	Pld	W	D	L	GF	GA	GD	Pts	Qualification
1	Egypt	3	2	1	0	10	5	+5	7	Knockout stage
2	Algeria	3	2	0	1	4	5	−1	6	Knockout stage
3	Saudi Arabia (H)	3	1	1	1	7	4	+3	4	
4	Palestine	3	0	0	3	2	9	−7	0	

Source: Soccerway
Rules for classification: Group stage tiebreakers
(H) Hosts
18 February 2020
14:45

Saudi Arabia	4–0	Palestine
Marran 24', 64', 90+4'; Al-Ali 56'

Prince Mohamed bin Fahd Stadium, Dammam
Referee: Abdulwahid Huraywidah (Libya)
18 February 2020
17:50

Algeria	1–4	Egypt
Boukerma 72'		Faisal 7', 46'; Abdelmohsen 83'; Adel 90+2'

Prince Mohamed bin Fahd Stadium, Dammam
Referee: Ahmed Issa Mohamed Darwish (United Arab Emirates)

21 February 2020
14:45

Egypt	2–2	Saudi Arabia
Abdelmagid 8'; Faisal 44'		Marran 54' (pen.); Yahya 90'

Prince Mohamed bin Fahd Stadium, Dammam
Referee: Adil Zourak (Morocco)
21 February 2020
17:50

Algeria	1–0	Palestine
Zerrouki 5'

Prince Mohamed bin Fahd Stadium, Dammam
Referee: Saddam Houssein Mansour (Djibouti)

24 February 2020
15:30

Saudi Arabia	1–2	Algeria
Yahya 74'		Zerrouki 67'; Bekkouche 79'

Prince Mohamed bin Fahd Stadium, Dammam
Referee: Murad Al Zawahreh (Jordan)
24 February 2020
15:30

Palestine	2–4	Egypt
Bani Odeh 6'; Nazzal 59'		Mohamed 2'; Adel 13'; Faisal 29'; Ashraf 50'

Prince Saud bin Jalawi Stadium, Khobar
Referee: Mohamad Darwich (Lebanon)

=== Group D ===
Pos	Team	Pld	W	D	L	GF	GA	GD	Pts	Qualification
1	Senegal	3	2	1	0	6	1	+5	7	Knockout stage
2	Libya	3	2	0	1	4	4	0	6	Knockout stage
3	United Arab Emirates	3	1	1	1	3	2	+1	4	
4	Sudan	3	0	0	3	1	7	−6	0	

Source: Soccerway
Rules for classification: Group stage tiebreakers
18 February 2020
14:45

Sudan	0–2	Libya
		Qulaib 54'; Algnay 71'

Prince Faisal bin Fahd Stadium, Riyadh
Referee: Mohammed Wathik Al-Baag (Iraq)
18 February 2020
18:00

United Arab Emirates	0–0	Senegal

Prince Faisal bin Fahd Stadium, Riyadh
Referee: Faisal Al-Balawi (Saudi Arabia)

21 February 2020
14:45

Senegal	3–1	Sudan
Samba Diallo 27'; Ba 41'; Pape Matar Sarr 42'		Yousef 51'

Prince Faisal bin Fahd Stadium, Riyadh
Referee: Saoud Al-Adba (Qatar)
21 February 2020
18:00

United Arab Emirates	1–2	Libya
Al-Hammadi 64'		Ibrek 13'; Sourait 79'

Prince Faisal bin Fahd Stadium, Riyadh
Referee: Lotfi Bekouassa (Algeria)

24 February 2020
15:30

Sudan	0–2	United Arab Emirates
		Ahmad 33'; Abdullah 90+3'

Prince Turki bin Abdul Aziz Stadium, Riyadh
Referee: Saad Al-Fadhli Kalefah (Kuwait)
24 February 2020
15:30

Libya	0–3	Senegal
		Ndiaye 75'; Sar 88', 90+1'

Prince Faisal bin Fahd Stadium, Riyadh
Referee: Faisal Al-Balawi (Saudi Arabia)

== Knockout stage ==
=== Bracket ===
Quarter-finals
27 February – Dammam
Tunisia	2
Algeria	0
27 February – Riyadh
Morocco (p)	0 (9)
Libya	0 (8)
27 February – Dammam
Egypt	1
Iraq	0
27 February – Riyadh
Senegal	5
Bahrain	0

Semi-finals
1 March – Dammam
Tunisia	4
Morocco	0
1 March – Dammam
Egypt	0 (5)
Senegal (p)	0 (6)

Final
5 March – Dammam
Tunisia	0
Senegal	1

=== Quarter-finals ===
27 February 2020
14:45

Morocco	0–0 (a.e.t.)	Libya
Penalties
Adriouech (penalty scored); Lahtimi (penalty scored); El Moubarek (penalty scored); Raoui (penalty missed); Abida (penalty scored); Chahir (penalty scored); Gharib (penalty scored); Amrani (penalty scored); Ramzi (penalty missed); El Azzouzi (penalty scored); Laghzal (penalty scored)	9–8	(penalty scored) ?; (penalty missed) Jadour; (penalty scored) Qulaib; (penalty scored) Ibrek; (penalty scored) Chabli; (penalty scored) Ettihari; (penalty scored) Takrak; (penalty scored) Chaloui; (penalty missed) Sourait; (penalty scored) Ibrahim; (penalty missed) Mimoun

Prince Turki bin Abdul Aziz Stadium, Riyadh
Referee: Mohammed Wathik Al-Baag (Iraq)

27 February 2020
14:45

Tunisia	2–0	Algeria
Labidi 13'; Sghaier 59'

Prince Saud bin Jalawi Stadium, Khobar
Referee: Ahmed El Ghandour (Egypt)

27 February 2020
18:30

Egypt	1–0	Iraq
Abdelmohsen 77'

Prince Saud bin Jalawi Stadium, Khobar
Referee: Abdulwahid Huraywidah (Libya)

27 February 2020
18:30

Senegal	5–0	Bahrain
Diallo 7', 17', 74'; Moussa Ndiaye 22', 81'

Prince Turki bin Abdul Aziz Stadium, Riyadh
Referee: Mehrez Melki (Tunisia)

=== Semi-finals ===
1 March 2020
14:45

Tunisia	4–0	Morocco
Berrima 21', 60'; Labidi 23'; Mimouni 55'

Prince Mohamed bin Fahd Stadium, Dammam
Referee: Ahmed Eisa Darwish (United Arab Emirates)

1 March 2020
18:30

Egypt	1–1 (a.e.t.)	Senegal
Adel 56' (pen.)		Sarr 59'
Penalties
	5–6

Prince Mohamed bin Fahd Stadium, Dammam
Referee: Lotfi Bekouassa (Algeria)

=== Final ===
4 March 2020
19:30

Tunisia	0–1	Senegal
		Diallo 45'

Prince Mohamed bin Fahd Stadium, Dammam
Referee: Faisal Al-Balawi (Saudi Arabia)

== Goalscorers ==
There were 96 goals scored in 31 matches, for an average of 3.1 goals per match.

5 goals

- (Senegal) Samba Diallo

4 goals

- (Egypt) Osama Faisal
- (Madagascar) Ricardo Menakely
- (Madagascar) Arnaud Randrianantenaina
- (Saudi Arabia) Mohammed Marran

3 goals

- (Egypt) Ibrahim Adel
- (Egypt) Babi Sar
- (Tunisia) Farouk Mimouni

2 goals

- (Algeria) Merouane Zerrouki
- (Bahrain) Sayed Jawad Alaoui
- (Bahrain) Abdellah Salem
- (Egypt) Mahmoud Saber Abdulmohsen
- (Mauritania) Youssouf Warr
- (Morocco) Omar Amrani
- (Morocco) Anouar El Azzouzi
- (Morocco) Abde Ezzalzouli
- (Saudi Arabia) Ayman Yahya
- (Senegal) Moussa Ndiaye
- (Tunisia) Zied Berrima
- (Tunisia) Chiheb Labidi
- (Tunisia) Yannis Sghaier

1 goal

- (Algeria) Mohamed Bekkouche
- (Algeria) Mohamed Boukerma
- (Bahrain) Hussein Abdul Aziz
- (Bahrain) Saleh Bader
- (Bahrain) Hussain Harouna
- (Bahrain) Hassan Issa
- (Bahrain) Salem Salem
- (Djibouti) Yussuf Ali
- (Djibouti) Suhaib Ibrahim
- (Djibouti) Kassim Kamel
- (Djibouti) Kandid Mohamed
- (Egypt) Hossam Abdelmagid
- (Egypt) Abdelrahman Ashraf
- (Egypt) Abdelghani Mohamed
- (Iraq) Ridha Fadhil
- (Iraq) Abdallah Mohamed
- (Kuwait) Ibrahim Marzouk
- (Libya) Eslam Algnay
- (Libya) Ibrahim Ibrek
- (Libya) Noureddine Qulaib
- (Libya) Osama Sourait
- (Madagascar) Elisco Nomenjanahary
- (Morocco) Haitam Abida
- (Morocco) Taha El Achbili
- (Morocco) Mahdi El Moubarek
- (Morocco) Achraf Gharib
- (Morocco) Montassir Lahtimi
- (Morocco) Mohamed Amine Sahel
- (Palestine) Anas Bani Odeh
- (Palestine) Mohammed Nazzal
- (Saudi Arabia) Hassan Al-Ali
- (Senegal) Nikhor Ba
- (Senegal) Abdulaye Ndiaye
- (Senegal) Pape Matar Sarr
- (Sudan) Tawfiq Yousef
- (Tunisia) Achraf Habassi
- (United Arab Emirates) Harib Abdullah
- (United Arab Emirates) Ali Ahmad
- (United Arab Emirates) Mohammad Al-Hammadi

Own goal

- (Mauritania) El Mokhtar Bilal (vs Iraq)

== Broadcasting rights ==
Below the list of broadcasting rights.

Country/Region	Broadcaster	Ref.
Arab World	beIN Sports	
Egypt	Time Sports	
Bahrain	Bahrain Sports	
Iraq	Al Iraqiya Sports	
Jordan	Jordan Sports	
Kuwait	KTV Sport	
Oman	Oman Sports TV	
Qatar	Al Kass Sports Channels	
Saudi Arabia	KSA Sports	
UAE	AD Sports	
UAE	Dubai Sports	
