= 2018 THB Champions League =

THB Champions League
- Season: 2018
- Dates: 22 June 2018 - 23 September 2018
- Champions: CNaPS Sport
- Matches played: 89
- Goals scored: 322 (3.62 per match)
- Average goals/game: 3.62
- Biggest home win: Fosa Juniors FC 12-0 FCA in July 13th 2018
- Biggest away win: FC Maeva 0-8 Fosa Juniors FC in June 29th 2018

The 2018 THB Champions League was the 52nd season of the THB Champions League, the top level football competition in Madagascar. The season began on 22 June 2018 and ended on 23 September 2018.

== Qualification ==
For the 2018 THB Champions League, 24 teams qualified to the tournament. All 22 regional league champions and 2 regional league runner-ups qualified to the tournament. Itasy provided the 2017 champions and Boeny provided the 2017 cup champions, so the runner-ups of the Itasy and Boeny regional leagues qualified to the tournament. Racing Soma Beach was runner-up of the Boeny regional league, while RTS-Jet Mada was runner-up of the Itasy regional league. The teams that won their regional leagues are:

FCA, FC AZ, AS St.-Michel Elgeco Plus, FC Léopard, ~~AS Espoir~~ (withdrew), Fils d'Eléphant, 3FB Toilara, Rabaza FC, ASCOMI Mahanoro, FC Maeva, Fosa Juniors FC, Ajesaia, FC Metal (Diego Suarez), FC Manjaka, CNaPS Sport, Akon'Ambatomea, MTM, FC Olympique Belo/Na, Jaolahin'i Iharana, TAM Port Bergé, FC Vakinankaratra and VFM.

All the teams above and the runner-ups of the Boeny and Itasy leagues qualified to the tournament.

== Format ==
The format for the 2018 THB Champions League had 3 phases. 24 teams qualified to the tournament.

In Phase 1, all 24 teams would be separated in 4 groups of 6 teams. In each group, the teams play a round-robin, then after all the matches ends, the first 3 out of 6 teams in the groups qualify to the Phase 2. In Phase 2, the 12 teams qualified would be separated in 2 groups of 6 teams. In each group, the teams play a round-robin, then after all the matches ends, the first 2 out of all teams in the groups qualify to the Poule des As (final phase). In the Poule des As, the teams play a home and away round-robin, then the first place in the group becomes champions.

== Phase 1 ==
Played between 22 June and 1 July. Final standings:

=== Vondrona A ===
Pos	Team	Pld	W	D	L	GF	GA	GD	Pts
1	Fosa Juniors FC (Boeny)	5	5	0	0	19	1	18	15
2	CNaPS Sports (Itasy)	5	4	0	1	19	2	17	12
3	TAM Port Berger (Sofia)	5	3	0	2	11	11	0	9
4	FC Metal (Diana)	5	1	1	3	10	13	-3	4
5	Jaolahin'i Iharana (Sava)	5	1	1	3	7	18	-11	4
6	FC Maeva (Betsiboka)	5	0	0	5	3	24	-21	0

=== Vondrona B ===
Pos	Team	Pld	W	D	L	GF	GA	GD	Pts
1	Ajesaia (Bongolava)	5	5	0	0	17	2	15	15
2	FCA (Alaotra-Mangoro)	5	4	0	1	12	9	3	12
3	MTM (Melaky)	5	1	2	2	9	10	-1	5
4	Ascoimi Mahanoro (Atsinanana)	5	1	2	2	6	10	-4	5
5	Racing Soma Beach (Boeny)	5	1	2	2	5	8	-3	5
6	FC Léopard (Analanjirofo)	5	0	0	5	3	13	-10	0

=== Vondrona C ===
Pos	Team	Pld	W	D	L	GF	GA	GD	Pts
1	RTS-Jet Mada (Itasy)	5	4	1	0	11	1	10	13
2	ASSM Elgeco Plus (Analamanga)	5	3	2	0	7	2	5	11
3	FC Vakinankaratra (Vakinankaratra)	5	2	1	2	6	3	3	7
4	FC AZ (Amoron'i Mania)	5	2	1	2	4	5	-1	7
5	Rabaza FC (Atsimo Atsinanana)	5	1	1	3	3	6	-3	4
6	FC Olympique Belo/Na (Menabe)	5	0	0	5	0	14	-14	0

=== Vondrona D ===
Pos	Team	Pld	W	D	L	GF	GA	GD	Pts
1	3FB Toliara (Atsimo Andrefana)	4	4	0	0	8	1	7	12
2	Fils d'Eléphant (Anosy)	4	3	0	1	6	4	2	9
3	Akon' Ambatomena (Haute Matsiatra)	4	2	0	2	10	4	6	6
4	VFM (V7V)	4	1	0	3	2	5	-3	3
5	FC Manjaka (Ihorombe)	4	0	0	4	1	13	-12	0
	AS Espoir Manerinerina (Androy)	Withdrew							

== Second phase ==
Played between 13 and 22 July. Final standings:

=== Vondrona 1 ===
Pos	Team	Pld	W	D	L	GF	GA	GD	Pts
1	Fosa Juniors FC (Boeny)	4	3	0	1	19	3	16	9
2	ASSM Elgeco Plus (Analamanga)	4	2	1	1	16	5	11	7
3	RTS-Jet Mada (Itasy)	4	2	1	1	8	5	3	7
4	TAM Port Berger (Sofia)	4	2	0	2	7	8	-1	6
5	FCA (Alaotra Mangoro)	4	0	0	4	1	30	-29	0
	MTM (Melaky)	Withdrew							

=== Vondrona 2 ===
Pos	Team	Pld	W	D	L	GF	GA	GD	Pts
1	CNaPS Sports (Itasy)	5	5	0	0	15	2	13	15
2	FC Vakinankaratra (Vakinankaratra)	5	3	0	2	12	7	5	9
3	Ajesaia (Bongolava)	5	3	0	2	18	5	13	9
4	3FB Toliara (Atsimo Andrefana)	5	2	1	2	8	8	0	7
5	Akon 'Ambatomena (Haute Matsiatra)	5	1	1	3	4	7	-3	4
6	Fils d'Eléphant (Anosy)	5	0	0	5	1	29	-28	0

== Final phase ==
Also known as Poule des As. Played between 5 August and 23 September (home-and-away basis). Qualified teams:

- CNaPS Sport
- Fosa Juniors
- Vakinankaratra
- Elgeco Plus

Pos	Team	Pld	W	D	L	GF	GA	GD	Pts
1	CNaPS Sports (Itasy)	6	4	1	1	9	3	6	13
2	Fosa Juniors FC (Boeny)	6	3	1	2	9	6	3	10
3	ASSM Elgeco Plus (Analamanga)	6	2	1	3	9	12	-3	7
4	FC Vakinankaratra (Vakinankaratra)	6	1	1	4	7	13	-6	4

== See also ==
- 2018 Coupe de Madagascar
