= Fenosoa Ratolojanahary =

Malagasy footballer

Personal information
- Date of birth: 1 August 1986 (age 40)
- Place of birth: Antananarivo, Madagascar
- Height: 1.84 m (6 ft 0 in)
- Position: Defender

Senior career*
Years	Team	Apps	(Gls)
2011?–2018	CNaPS Sport		

International career^{‡}
2015–2016	Madagascar	2	(0)
- * Club domestic league appearances and goals as of 1 August 2020 ‡ National team caps and goals as of 1 August 2020

Fenosoa Ratolojanahary (born 1 August 1986) is a retired Malagasy football defender.
