= Felix Kerber =

Austrian footballer

Personal information
- Date of birth: 25 October 2002 (age 24)
- Place of birth: Hall in Tirol, Austria
- Position: Forward

Team information
- Current team: FC Dornbirn (on loan from WSG Tirol)
- Number: 24

Youth career
- 2009–2012: SV Hall
- 2012–2020: WSG Tirol

Senior career*
Years	Team	Apps	(Gls)
2020–	WSG Tirol	2	(0)
2022–	→ FC Dornbirn (loan)	15	(4)
- * Club domestic league appearances and goals as of 20 June 2023

Felix Kerber (born 25 October 2002) is an Austrian professional footballer who plays as a forward for FC Dornbirn, on loan from WSG Tirol.

== Career statistics ==
=== Club ===
As of match played 23 July 2022

Appearances and goals by club, season and competition
Club	Season	League			National Cup		Continental		Other		Total	
Club	Season	Division	Apps	Goals	Apps	Goals	Apps	Goals	Apps	Goals	Apps	Goals
WSG Tirol	2019–20	Bundesliga	1	0	0	0	—		0	0	1	0
WSG Tirol	2020–21	Bundesliga	0	0	0	0	—		0	0	0	0
WSG Tirol	2021–22	Bundesliga	1	0	1	0	—		0	0	2	0
WSG Tirol	Total		2	0	1	0	—		0	0	3	0
FC Dornbirn	2022–23	Second League	1	0	1	0	—		0	0	2	0
Career total			3	0	2	0	—		0	0	4	0
