= Football at the 2023 Indian Ocean Island Games – Men's tournament =

2023 Men's Indian Ocean Island Games Football Tournament
Tournament details
- Host country: Madagascar
- Dates: 25 August – 2 September 2023 (8 days)
- Teams: (from 2 confederations)
- Venues: 2 (in 1 host city)

Final positions
- Champions: Madagascar (3rd title)
- Runners-up: Réunion
- Third place: Mauritius
- Fourth place: Comoros

Tournament statistics
- Matches played: 10
- Goals scored: 18 (1.8 per match)
- Top scorer(s): (Madagascar) Tendry Randrianarijaona (4 goals)

Association football is one of seventeen events at the 2023 Indian Ocean Island Games to be held in Madagascar from 25 August to 2 September 2023. Matches for the men's football tournament will be played in the nation's capital, Antananarivo.

== Teams ==
The following six teams will take part in the competition. The Maldives will compete in the games but its football team will not take part.

- Comoros
- Madagascar
- Mauritius
- Mayotte
- Réunion
- Seychelles

== Venues ==
Madagascar
Madagascar	Antananarivo	
Madagascar	Mahamasina Municipal Stadium	Elgeco Plus Stadium
Madagascar	Capacity: 40,888	Capacity: 2,000

== Format ==
The six participating nations were drawn into two groups of three. The first and second place finishers from each group will advance to the knockout rounds.

== Group stage ==
=== Group A ===
Pos	Team	Pld	W	D	L	GF	GA	GD	Pts
1	Madagascar (H)	2	1	1	0	2	1	+1	4
2	Mauritius	2	1	1	0	2	1	+1	4
3	Seychelles	2	0	0	2	0	2	−2	0

Source: IOCS
(H) Hosts
24 August

Madagascar	1–0	Seychelles
Tendry 19'	Report

Elgeco Plus Stadium, Antananarivo
26 August

Madagascar	1–1	Mauritius
Tsiry 4'	Report	François 73'

Mahamasina Municipal Stadium, Antananarivo
28 August

Mauritius	1–0	Seychelles
François 17'	Report

Mahamasina Municipal Stadium, Antananarivo

=== Group B ===
Pos	Team	Pld	W	D	L	GF	GA	GD	Pts
1	Réunion	2	0	2	0	1	1	0	2
2	Comoros	2	0	2	0	1	1	0	2
3	Mayotte	2	0	2	0	0	0	0	2

Source: IOCS
24 August 2023

Comoros	0–0	Mayotte
	Report

Elgeco Plus Stadium, Antananarivo
26 August 2023

Réunion	0–0	Mayotte
	Report

Elgeco Plus Stadium, Antananarivo
28 August 2023

Comoros	1–1	Réunion
Ali Mze 76'	Report	Bakary 38'

Elgeco Plus Stadium, Antananarivo

== Knockout stage ==
=== Bracket ===
Semi-finals
31 August – Antananarivo
Madagascar	4
Comoros	2
31 August – Antananarivo
Réunion	2
Mauritius	1

Final
2 September – Antananarivo
Madagascar (a.e.t.)	1
Réunion	0
Third place
2 September – Antananarivo
Comoros	0
Mauritius	2

=== Semi-finals ===
31 August 2023

Madagascar	4–2	Comoros
Raheriniaina 2', 48'; Tendry 4', 64'	Report	Saïd 18'; Soloniaina 59' (o.g.)

Mahamasina Municipal Stadium, Antananarivo
31 August 2023

Réunion	2–1	Mauritius
Vardapin 45+2'; Lagourd 48'	Report	Aristide 57'

Mahamasina Municipal Stadium, Antananarivo

=== Third place match ===
2 September 2023

Comoros	0–2	Mauritius
	Report	Nazira 32'; Ferré 73'

Elgeco Plus Stadium, Antananarivo

=== Final ===
2 September 2023

Madagascar	1–0	Réunion
Tendry 119' (pen.)	Report; Report

Mahamasina Municipal Stadium, Antananarivo

== Statistics ==
=== Goalscorers ===
There have been 18 goals scored in 10 matches, for an average of 1.8 goals per match (as of 4 September 2023).

4 goals

- (Madagascar) Tendry Randrianarijaona

2 goals

- (Madagascar) El Hadari Raheriniaina
- (Mauritius) Aurélien François

1 goal

- (Comoros) Moudhoiffar Ali Mze
- (Comoros) Sadad Abdallah Saïd
- (Madagascar) Randriatsiferana toky olivier Tsiry
- (Mauritius) Jason Ferré
- (Mauritius) Yannick Aristide
- (Mauritius) Ashley Nazira
- (Réunion) Bakary
- (Réunion) Ludovic Lagourd
- (Réunion) Anjy Vardapin

1 own goal

- (Madagascar) Soloniaina Razafindraibeharimihanta (against Comoros)
