= Jean Dieu-Donné Randrianasolo =

Malagasy footballer

Personal information
- Date of birth: 26 May 1989 (age 37)
- Height: 1.75 m (5 ft 9 in)
- Position: Goalkeeper

Team information
- Current team: CNaPS Sport

Senior career*
| Years | Team | Apps | (Gls) |
| 2011– | CNaPS Sport | | |

International career^{‡}
| 2011– | Madagascar | 35 | (0) |
- * Club domestic league appearances and goals as of 12:14, 18 October 2018 (UTC) ‡ National team caps and goals as of 09:52, 2 February 2020 (UTC)

Jean Dieu-Donné Randrianasolo (born 26 May 1989) is a Malagasy international footballer who plays for CNaPS Sport, as a goalkeeper.

== Career ==
He has played club football for CNaPS Sport.

He made his international debut for Madagascar in 2011.
