= Athenkosi Mcaba =

South African soccer player

Personal information
- Date of birth: 17 September 2002 (age 24)
- Place of birth: Springs, South Africa
- Position: Defender

Team information
- Current team: Sekhukhune United
- Number: 32

Youth career
- Jealous Down
- 2017–2020: Bidvest Wits
- 2021: Cape Umoya United

Senior career*
Years	Team	Apps	(Gls)
2021–2026	Stellenbosch	45	(1)
2026–	Sekhukhune United	0	(0)

International career^{‡}
2018	South Africa U17		
2022–	South Africa	7	(0)
- * Club domestic league appearances and goals as of 4 January 2026 ‡ National team caps and goals as of 16:00, 21 February 2026 (UTC)

Athenkosi Mcaba (born 9 January 2002) is a South African professional soccer player who plays as a defender for Sekhukhune United and the South Africa national team.

== Club career ==
Mcaba was born in Springs on 9 January 2002. After playing for Jealous Down FC, an amateur side in Springs, he played for the Bidvest Wits academy between 2017 and 2020. A spell with Cape Umoya United followed in early 2021, before he signed for Stellenbosch in June 2021, initially joining their reserve side before joining their first team in August. He made his senior debut on 4 December 2021, starting in a back three against Mamelodi Sundowns as Stellenbosch drew 1–1.

== International career ==
Mcaba was part of the South African under-17 team for the 2018 COSAFA Under-17 Championship, in which South Africa lost the final 1–0 to Angola. He was named in a senior South Africa squad for the first time in March 2022 for fixtures against Guinea and France. He made his debut for South Africa as a second-half substitute in the 0–0 draw with Guinea.

== Career statistics ==
=== International ===
As of match played 7 June 2025

Appearances and goals by national team and year
National team	Year	Apps	Goals
South Africa	2022	4	0
South Africa	2024	2	0
South Africa	2025	1	0
Total		7	0
