= Golden Mafwenta =

Zambian footballer (born 2001)

Personal information
- Date of birth: 15 January 2001 (age 25)
- Place of birth: Lusaka, Zambia
- Height: 1.78 m (5 ft 10 in)
- Position: Defender

Team information
- Current team: Naftan Novopolotsk
- Number: 50

Senior career*
| Years | Team | Apps | (Gls) |
| 2018–2020 | Zanaco | | |
| 2020–2022 | Buildcon Ndola | | |
| 2022 | Real Monarchs | 19 | (2) |
| 2022–2025 | MFK Vyškov | 37 | (1) |
| 2024–2025 | → Metalist 1925 Kharkiv (loan) | 15 | (0) |
| 2026– | Naftan Novopolotsk | 6 | (0) |

International career^{‡}
| 2021– | Zambia | 8 | (0) |
- * Club domestic league appearances and goals as of 6 July 2026 ‡ National team caps and goals as of 26 January 2026

Golden Mafwenta (born 15 January 2001) is a Zambian professional footballer who plays as a defender for Belarusian Premier League club Naftan Novopolotsk.
