= Dani Lual =

South Sudanese footballer (born 2002)

Personal information
- Full name: Dani Lual Gumnok Thon
- Date of birth: 29 November 2002 (age 23)
- Place of birth: Kakuma, Kenya
- Height: 1.87 m (6 ft 2 in)
- Position: Centre-forward

Team information
- Current team: Speyer 09
- Number: 13

Senior career*
Years	Team	Apps	(Gls)
–2019	Atlabara		
2019–2021	Mathare United		
2021–2024	MFK Vyškov	9	(1)
2022	→ Blansko (loan)	23	(5)
2023	→ Super Nova (loan)	13	(1)
2024	Știința Miroslava	0	(0)
2024–	Speyer 09	0	(0)

International career^{‡}
2021–	South Sudan	2	(1)
- * Club domestic league appearances and goals as of 21 November 2021 ‡ National team caps and goals as of 12 October 2021

Dani Lual Gumnok Thon (born 29 November 2002) is a South Sudanese footballer who plays as a forward for FC Speyer 09 and the South Sudan national team.

== Club career ==
Lula started his career with Atlabara. In 2019, he signed for Kenyan side Mathare United. After that, Lual trialed for Valencia C in Spain.

In 2021, he came to the Czech Republic, more precisely to the second league in Vyškov. Besides playing for their first team, he also played for their youth team. In 2022, he was sent on loan to Blansko.

== International career ==
Lual made his debut for his national team in October 2021. He made his first appearance against Sierra Leone.

== Career statistics ==
=== Club ===
As of match played 20 November 2022

Appearances and goals by club, season and competition
Club	Season	League			Cup		Europe		Other		Total	
Club	Season	League	Apps	Goals	Apps	Goals	Apps	Goals	Apps	Goals	Apps	Goals
MFK Vyškov	2021–22	Fortuna národní liga	7	1	0	0	–		–		7	1
MFK Vyškov	2022–23	Fortuna národní liga	2	0	1	1	–		–		3	1
MFK Vyškov	Total		9	1	1	1	0	0	0	0	10	2
Blansko (loan)	2022–23	Fortuna národní liga	9	4	0	0	–		–		9	4
Career total			18	5	1	1	0	0	0	0	19	6

=== International ===
Statistics accurate as of match played 12 October 2021.

South Sudan
Year	Apps	Goals
2021	2	1
Total	2	1

=== International goals ===
Scores and results list South Sudan's goal tally first, score column indicates score after each Lual goal.

List of international goals scored by Dani Lual
No.	Date	Venue	Opponent	Score	Result	Competition
1	12 October 2021	Stade El Abdi, El Jadida, Morocco	Gambia	1–2	1–2	Friendly
