= Ibrahima Dramé =

Senegalese footballer

Personal information
- Full name: Ibrahima Dramé
- Date of birth: 6 October 2001 (age 25)
- Place of birth: Sédhiou, Senegal
- Height: 1.67 m (5 ft 6 in)
- Position: Forward

Team information
- Current team: Bnei Sakhnin
- Number: 11

Senior career*
Years	Team	Apps	(Gls)
2017–2020	Diambars FC		
2020–2022	Juniors OÖ	27	(5)
2022–2023	Young Violets	20	(7)
2022–2023	Austria Wien	3	(0)
2023	Bandırmaspor	0	(0)
2024–	Dila Gori	57	(6)
2025–	Bnei Sakhnin	22	(0)

International career
2019	Senegal U20	8	(0)
2019	Senegal	2	(0)
- * Club domestic league appearances and goals as of 24 June 2026

Ibrahima Dramé (born 6 October 2001) is a Senegalese professional footballer who plays as a forward for Israeli club Bnei Sakhnin.

== Club career ==
On 8 January 2020, Austrian first tier side LASK announced the signing of Dramé for 3.5 years until summer 2023. Initially he was designated to LASK's reserve team Juniors OÖ playing in second tier.

He made his Austrian Football First League debut for Juniors OÖ as a starter on 21 February 2020 in a home game against SV Lafnitz.

== International career ==
Dramé was capped for Senegal U20 during the 2019 Africa U-20 Cup and the 2019 FIFA U-20 World Cup. In 2019, he also earned two caps for the Senegal national football team.

== Career statistics ==
=== International ===
Appearances and goals by national team and year
National team	Year	Apps	Goals
Senegal	2019	2	0
Total		2	0
