= Francisco Mwepu =

Zambian footballer (born 2000)

Personal information
- Date of birth: 29 February 2000 (age 26)
- Place of birth: Chambishi, Zambia
- Height: 1.78 m (5 ft 10 in)
- Position: Forward

Senior career*
| Years | Team | Apps | (Gls) |
| –2020 | Kafue Celtic | | |
| 2020 | → Red Arrows (loan) | | |
| 2020–2022 | Sturm Graz II | 8 | (1) |
| 2020–2022 | Sturm Graz | 8 | (0) |
| 2022–2023 | Cádiz B | 28 | (7) |
| 2023–2026 | Cádiz | 10 | (1) |
| 2023–2024 | → Sanluqueño (loan) | 33 | (9) |
| 2025–2026 | → Sanluqueño (loan) | 0 | (0) |

International career
| 2020 | Zambia | 1 | (0) |
- * Club domestic league appearances and goals as of 1 April 2025

Francisco Mwepu (born 29 February 2000) is a Zambian professional footballer who plays as a forward.

== Career ==
In 2018, Mwepu trialed for Red Bull Salzburg. In 2020, he signed for Austrian Bundesliga club Sturm Graz.

On 15 September 2022, Mwepu signed for La Liga side Cádiz CF and was initially assigned to the reserves in Segunda Federación. He made his first team debut on 24 May 2023, replacing Théo Bongonda in a 2–0 away loss to Villarreal CF.

On 29 June 2023, Mwepu renewed his contract with Cádiz until 2026, and was loaned to Primera Federación side Atlético Sanluqueño CF on 11 August. Upon returning, he featured rarely until suffering a knee injury in April 2025, and returned to Sanluqueño on loan on 29 August of that year.

== Career statistics ==
As of 28 April 2021

Appearances and goals by club, season and competition
| Club | Season | League | | | Austrian Cup | | Continental | | Total | |
| Club | Season | Division | Apps | Goals | Apps | Goals | Apps | Goals | Apps | Goals |
|---|---|---|---|---|---|---|---|---|---|---|
| Sturm Graz | 2020–21 | Austrian Bundesliga | 8 | 0 | 0 | 0 | – | | 8 | 0 |
| Career total | | | 8 | 0 | 0 | 0 | 0 | 0 | 8 | 0 |

== Personal life ==
His older brother, Enock, was a professional footballer before retiring due to health issues and played for Brighton & Hove Albion in the Premier League.
