= AS Espoir Ambovombe =

Malagasy football club

Espoir Ambovombe
- Full name: AS Espoir Ambovombe
- Ground: Municipal, Madagascar
- League: THB Champions League

AS Espoir Ambovombe is a Malagasy football club who currently plays in the THB Champions League the top division of Malagasy football. The team is based in the Ambovombe-Androy region in southern Madagascar.
