= COSFAP Antananarivo =

Malagasy football club

COSFAP
- Full name: COSFAP Antananarivo
- Ground: Mahamasina Stadium; Antananarivo, Madagascar
- Capacity: 22,000
- League: Malagasy Second Division

COSFAP Antananarivo is a Malagasy football club based in Antananarivo, Madagascar. The team has won the THB Champions League in 1988, qualifying them for the 1989 African Cup of Champions Clubs.

The team currently plays in the Malagasy Second Division.

== Achievements ==
- THB Champions League: 1

1988

== Performance in CAF competitions ==
- CAF Champions League: 1 appearance

1989 African Cup of Champions Clubs - first round
