= CNaPS Sport =

Malagasy football club

- Full name: Caisse Nationale de Prévoyance Sociale Sport
- Nickname: Les Caissiers (The Cashiers)
- Ground: Stade Municipal de Toamasina, Miarinarivo
- Capacity: 2,500
- Chairman: Julien Rakotozafy
- Manager: Frédéric Ramiandrisoa
- League: THB Champions League
- 2022-23: Semifinals

CNaPS Sport is a football club from Madagascar based in Miarinarivo, Itasy. Between 2010 and 2018, they were crowned football champions of Madagascar seven times.

== Achievements ==
THB Champions League 7

2010, 2013, 2014, 2015, 2016, 2017, 2018.

Coupe de Madagascar 3

2011, 2015, 2016.

Super Coupe de Madagascar 1

2010.

== Performance in CAF competitions ==
- CAF Champions League: 2 appearances

2011 – Preliminary Round
2014 – Preliminary Round

== Players ==
Note: Flags indicate national team as defined under FIFA eligibility rules; some limited exceptions apply. Players may hold more than one non-FIFA nationality.

No.	Pos.	Nation	Player
—	GK	MAD	Anatole Ndriamparany
—	GK	MAD	Patrice Rakotonandrasana
—	GK	MAD	Jean Dieu-Donné Randrianasolo
—	DF	MAD	Andréas Jaofeno
—	DF	MAD	Eglesias Louis
—	DF	MAD	Ando Rakotondrazaka
—	DF	MAD	Elysée Randriamanantena
—	DF	MAD	Naina Randrianantenaina
—	DF	MAD	Tahiana Randrianarisoa
—	DF	MAD	Fenosoa Ratolojanahary
—	MF	MAD	Tahiry Andrianambinintsoa

No.	Pos.	Nation	Player
—	MF	MAD	Tovohery Rabenandrasana
—	MF	MAD	Rija Rakotomandimby
—	MF	MAD	Rinah Randrianaivo
—	MF	MAD	Hery Randrianantenaina
—	MF	MAD	Jean José Razafimandimby
—	MF	MAD	Tojo Razafindrabe
—	FW	MAD	Henri Gladison
—	FW	MAD	Yvan Rajoarimanana
—	FW	MAD	Landry Rasamimanana
—	FW	MAD	Jeannot Vonimbola
