= Fosa Juniors FC =

Malagasy football club

- Full name: Fosa Juniors Football Club
- Chairman: Stéphane Boisseau
- Manager: Pierre Andriamanijoro
- League: THB Champions League
- 2019: THB Champions League, 1st

Fosa Juniors FC is a Malagasy football club based in Mahajanga. In 2019, they were crowned football champions of Madagascar for the first time in their history.

== Achievements ==
- THB Champions League : 1

2019.

- Coupe de Madagascar : 2

2017, 2019.

- Super Coupe de Madagascar : 0

== Performance in CAF competitions ==
- CAF Confederation Cup: (2018) - 3 tours

2018 – Play off Round

== Performance 2024 ==
- Coupe de Madagascar 1/4 finals, Disciples FC (Vakinankaratra) - Fosa Juniors FC (Boeny) 2 : 1
