= Football in Senegal =

- Country: Senegal
- Governing body: Senegalese Football Federation
- National team: national football team

National competitions
- Africa Cup of Nations; FIFA World Cup

Club competitions
- Cups: Senegal FA Cup Coupe de la Ligue League: Senegal Premier League

International competitions
- Champions League; CAF Confederation Cup; Super Cup; FIFA Club World Cup

Football is one of the most popular sport in Senegal. The national team of Senegal is called the Lions of Teranga. In 2022 Senegal won the Africa Cup of Nations for the first time. Since then, the national team has played in a number of World Cups.

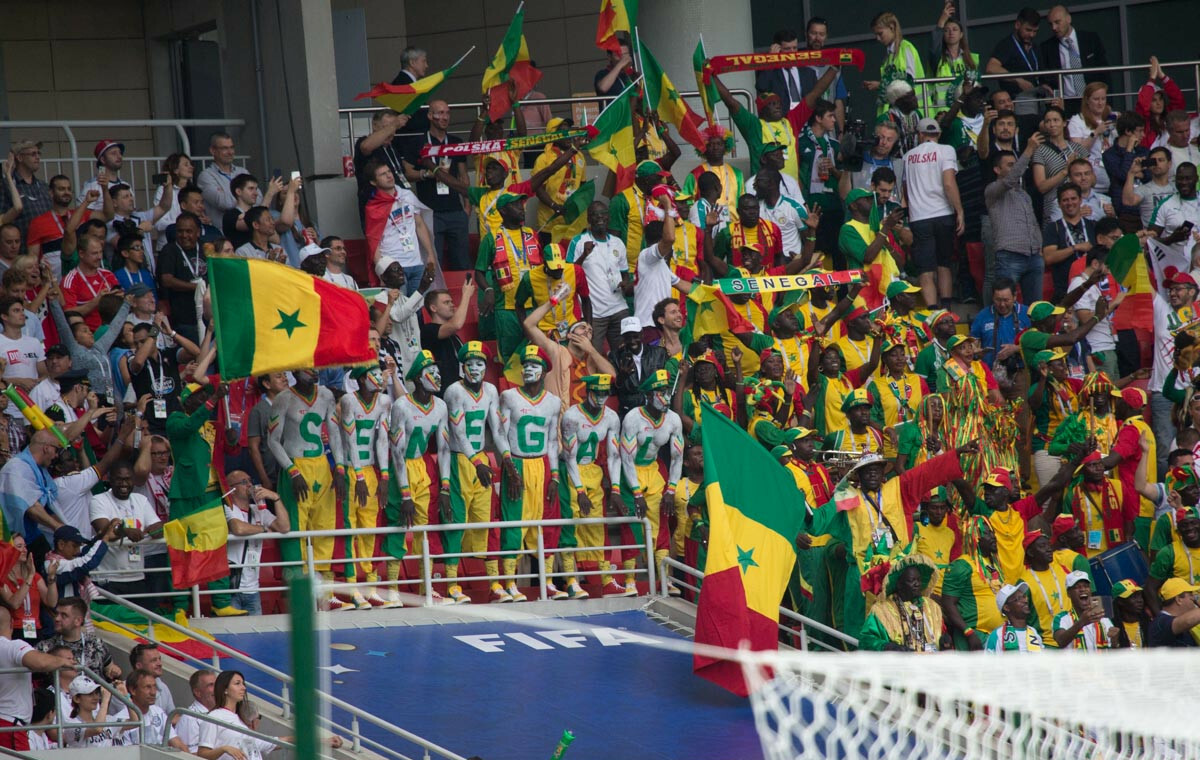
Senegalese football fans in Russia.

The sport of football is currently the most popular sport in Senegal. Approximately 60% of the population in Senegal are interested in football.

In the country of Senegal, football is run by the Senegalese Football Federation. The association administers the national football team, as well as the Premier League. Some of the most notable players from the country include Roger Mendy, Jules Bocandé, Tony Sylva, Henri Camara, El Hadji Diouf, Sadio Mané and Kalidou Koulibaly.

== League system ==
The Senegalese league system is divided into two leagues: Ligue 1 to Ligue 2, equivalent to the leagues in France and has been professional since 2007. The lower three are divided into National 1 and 2 which are amateur levels. Senegal also feature cup competitions, a major cup being the Senegal FA Cup, which was founded in the 1980s. Another cup is the Senegalese Super Cup, which was known as the National Assembly Cup, created in 1979, the League Cup created in 2009 and the Champion's Trophy created in 2014.

== History ==
Football in Senegal has been introduced around the 20th century during French colonial rule. One of the first clubs of the country were ASC Jeanne d'Arc and Foyer France Senegal. After independence, Foyer France Senegal became ASC Diaraf. Numerous clubs were created in the 1970s and the 1990s. For many seasons, all of the clubs participating comes from the western part of the country where Dakar, Saint-Louis and Ziguinchor are located. The Second Division was created in the 1970s, the Third and the Fourth Divisions were later created and in the 1990s, the regional divisions were created. The newest clubs in Senegal are Diambars and Génération Foot, the two were in Ligue 1 as of the 2016-17 season, the latter spending their first season.

Diaraf is the leader in the number of titles numbering 11 championship and 15 cup titles. ASC Jeanne d'Arc is second with 10 championship and 6 cup titles. Next is AS Douanes Gorée and several more clubs, several have a title each.

Several clubs including Diaraf and Jeanne d'Arc competed in the continental championship and cup competitions, the two competed the most.

== Stadiums ==
Stade Demba Diop and Stade de Diaraf are its busiest stadiums in Senegal and has the largest seating capacity, they are located in the capital Dakar.

== National team ==
The men's national football team's greatest international success was reaching the quarter-finals of the 2002 FIFA World Cup, the second joint-best finish by an African country behind Morocco’s historic run to the semi-finals at the 2022 FIFA World Cup. The nation won their only Africa Cup of Nations title in 2021, and reached the final in 2002, 2019, and 2025.

Senegal's 2nd place finish in the 2025 edition of AFCON was the source of great controversy, with manager Pape Thiaw instructing the team to forfeit during the second half, and Senegalese hooligans physically assaulting Moroccan stadium staff.

== Seasons in Senegalese football ==
2010s:	2010–11	2011–12	2012–13	2013–14	2014–15	2015–16	2016–17

=== First-tier championships ===
1960s		1961	1962	1963	1964	1965	1966	1967	1968	1969
1970s:	1970	1971	1972	1973	1974	1975	1976	1977	1978	1979
1980s:	1980	1981	1982	1983	1984	1985	1986	1987	1988	1989
1990s:	1990	1990–91	1991–92	1993	1994	1995	1996	1997	1998	1999
2000s:	2000	2000–01	2001–02	2002–03	2003–04	2005	2006	2007	2008	2009
2010s:	2010	2010–11	2011–12	2013	2013-14	2014–15	2015–16	2016–17		

== Support ==
Twitter research from 2015 found that the most popular English Premier League club in Senegal was Chelsea, with 26% of Senegalese Premier League fans following the club, followed by Manchester United (22%) and Arsenal (15%).

=== Attendances ===
The 2023-24 Ligue 1 clubs sorted by average home attendance:

#	Football club	Average attendance
1	AS Pikine	3,278
2	ASC Jaraaf	2,203
3	Guédiawaye FC	1,303
4	Sonacos BFP	1,167
5	Casa Sports	1,176
6	Teungueth FC	1,011
7	Dakar Sacré-Cœur	958
8	US Ouakam	800
9	Stade de Mbour	706
10	Génération Foot	522
11	Jamono Fatick	458
12	ASCE La Linguère	279
13	Diambars FC	268
14	US Gorée	193
Average per club		1,028

== See also ==
- List of football clubs in Senegal
- Sport in Senegal
