= List of football stadiums in Senegal =

This is a list of football (soccer) stadiums in Senegal, ranked in descending order of capacity. The largest stadium in Senegal which is not used for football is the 20,000-capacity National Wrestling Arena in Pikine.

This list is not comprehensive. It includes:

- The stadiums of all clubs in the top four tiers of the Senegalese football league system as of the 2016–17 season (Ligue 1 to National 2), with rankings within each league given.
- The stadiums of teams from Senegal which play in national leagues of other football associations, as of the 2016–17 season.
- All other football stadiums with a capacity of at least 5,000.

== Current stadiums ==
| # | Image | Stadium | Capacity | City | Home team(s) |
|---|---|---|---|---|---|
| 1 | | Diamniadio Olympic Stadium | 50,000 | Dakar | Senegal national team |
| 2 | | Stade Léopold Sédar Senghor | 40,000 | Dakar | Senegal national team |
| 3 | | Stade de Diaraf | 15,000 | Dakar | ASC Jaraaf |
| 4 | | Stade Demba Diop | 15,000 | Dakar | ASC Jeanne d'Arc, ASC Jaraaf, AS Douanes, US Gorée, ASC Niarry Tally, US Ouakam |
| 5 | | Stade Aline Sitoe Diatta | 10,000 | Ziguinchor | Casa Sports |
| 6 | | Stade Municipal de Richard Toll | 10,000 | Richard-Toll | AS Sucrière de La Réunion de Richard-Toll |
| 7 | | Stade Ngalandou Diouf | 7,500 | Rufisque | Teungueth FC |
| 8 | | Stade Amadou Barry | 5,000 | Guédiawaye | Guédiawaye FC |
| 9 | | Stade Caroline Faye | 5,000 | Mbour | Mbour-Pétite Côte FC |
| 10 | | Stade Ely Manel Fall | 5,000 | Diourbel | ASC SONACOS |
| 11 | | Stade Port Autonome | 4,000 | Dakar | ASC Port Autonome |
| 12 | | Stade Al Djigo | 4,000 | Pikine | AS Pikine |
| 13 | | Stade de Ngor | 3,000 | Dakar | Olympique de Ngor |
| 14 | | Stade Alboury Niaye | 3,000 | Louga | ASAC Ndiambour |
| 15 | | Stade Fodé Wade | 2,000 | Saly | Diambars FC |
| 16 | | Stade Mawade Wade | 1,500 | Saint-Louis | ASC Linguère, Saint-Louis FC |
| 17 | | Stade Deni Biram Ndao | 1,000 | Deni Biram Ndao | Génération Foot |
| 18 | | Stade Lamine Guèye | 1,000 | Kaolack | ASC Saloum |

== See also ==
- Lists of stadiums
- List of association football stadiums by capacity
- List of African stadiums by capacity
