= List of football clubs in Senegal by competitive honours won =

This is a list of the major honours won by football clubs in Senegal. It lists every Senegalese association football club to have won any of the major domestic trophies, the Senegalese League, the Senegalese Cup, the Senegalese Super Cup (then the National Assembly (Assemblée Nationale) Cup), the Senegalese League Cup and the Senegalese Champion's Trophy, or the international competition the UFOA Cup, since Senegalese clubs have not won any major official African competition yet.

== Honours table ==
	Club	League	Cup	Super Cup	League Cup	Trophy	West Africa (Note: Includes the Colonial French West African Cup and the UFOA Cup)	Total	Last Trophy
1	ASC Diaraf	11	15	3	0	0	1	28	2013 Cup
2	ASC Jeanne d'Arc	10	6	3	0	0	2	21	2003 Championship
3	AS Douanes	6	6	1	1	0	0	14	2015 AN Cup
4	US Gorée	4	4	1	0	1	0	9	2016 Champs' Trophy
5	ASEC Ndiambour	3	1	3	0	0	0	7	2004 AN Cup
6	AS Police	1	3	2	0	0	0	6	1981 Cup
=	SUNEOR Djourbel	4	1	1	0	0	0	6	2005 AN Cup
=	Casa Sports	1	2	0	2	1	0	6	2013 Trophy
9	UCST Port Autonome	3	1	1	0	0	0	5	2005 Championship
=	ASC Linguère	1	4	0	0	0	0	5	2007 Cup
=	Diambars FC	1	0	3	1	0	0	5	2016 League Cup
12	ASFA Dakar	3	0	0	0	0	1	4	1978 UFOA Cup
=	Génération Foot	2	2	0	0	0	0	4	2019 League
=	US Ouakam	1	3	0	0	0	0	4	2011 League
=	AS Pikine	1	1	0	1	0	0	3	2014 League
16	Espoir de Saint-Louis	1	1	0	0	0	0	2	1967 Championship
=	ASC Niarry-Tally	0	1	0	1	0	0	2	2016 Cup
=	Olympique Thiès	2	0	0	0	0	0	2	1966 Championship
=	Stade de Mbour	0	0	1	1	0	0	2	2017 League Cup
20	ASC HLM	0	1	0	0	0	0	1	2012 Cup
=	Mbour Petite-Côte	0	1	0	0	0	0	1	2017 Cup
=	US Rail	0	1	0	0	0	0	1	1963 Cup
=	Saltigues Rufisque	0	1	0	0	0	0	1	1977 Cup
=	ASC Saint-Louisienne	0	1	0	0	0	0	1	1966 Cup
=	Toure Kunda Footpro	0	1	0	0	0	0	1	2010 Cup
=	ASC Yeggo	0	1	0	0	0	0	1	1998 Cup
=	Olympique de Ngor	0	0	1	0	0	0	1	2014 AN Cup
=	ASC Yakaar	0	0	1	0	0	0	1	2008 AN Cup
=	Guédiawaye FC	0	0	0	1	0	0	1	2014 League Cup

== See also ==
- List of football clubs by competitive honours won
