= 2009–10 ASC Diaraf season =

ASC Diaraf
2009–10 season
- Manager: Lamine Dieng
- Stadium: Stade Bemba Diop
- Ligue 1: Champion
Home colours	Away colours

The 2009–10 ASC Diaraf season, sometimes as ASC Jaraaf were in the top division of Senegalese football. They would win their 11th and most recent title and would possess the most number of national championship titles, one more than ASC Jeanne d'Arc which was shared for six years. They would be placed first in Group B with 21 points, 8 wins and 22 goals, they would win the finals stage, Diaraf lost the first match 1-0 and won 3-1 against NGB ASC Niarry Tally. They would participate in the 2011 CAF Champions League.

The highest points scored was against ASC Yakaar with 0-6.

== Ligue 1 ==
ASC Diaraf participate in Group B during the 2009-10 season.

Pos	Team	Pld	W	D	L	GF	GA	GD	Pts	Promotion/Relegation
1	ASC Diaraf	16	8	7	1	22	3	+19	31	Advanced into the finals
2	Casa Sport	16	7	5	4	28	13	+15	26	None

Match dates not available ASC Diaraf participated in Group B during the 2009-10 season.

Home matches:

- ASC Diaraf - Casa Sports 2-0
- ASC Diaraf - US Gorée 1-0
- ASC Diaraf - Guédiawaye FC 3-0
- ASC Diaraf - US Ouakam 0-0
- ASC Diaraf - AS Pikine 0-0
- ASC Diaraf - ASC Saloum 3-0
- ASC Diaraf - ASC Yakaar 6-0
- ASC Diaraf - Renaissance sportive de Yoff 1-1

Away matches:

- Casa Ports - ASC Diaraf 0-3
- US Gorée - ASC Diaraf 1-1
- Guédiawaye FC - ASC Diaraf 0-0
- US Ouakam - ASC Diaraf 1-0
- AS Pikine - ASC Diaraf 0-1
- ASC Saloum - ASC Diaraf 0-1
- ASC Yakaar - ASC Diaraf 0-0
- Renaissance sportive de Yoff - ASC Diaraf 0-0

=== Finals ===
- NGB ASC Niarry Tally - ASC Diaraf 1-0
- ASC Diaraf - NGB ASC Niarry Tally 3-1

== League Cup (Coupe de la Ligue) ==
Diaraf appeared in their second League Cup, the club defeated Dakar UC 0-1 in the first round and succeeded beyond the first round for the first time and defeated three other clubs on the way, RS Yoff 3-0 in 1/8 final, CSS Richard-Toll in the quarter-finals and ASC Port Autonome 2-0 in the semis which brought Diaraf to the final match for the first time. Diaraf lost the final to Casa Sport 1-2. Diaraf was ranked second place, their highest in any of the country's League Cup.

Round	Opponents	H/A	Result F–A	Scorers
First Round	Dakar UC	A	0-1	
1/8 final	RS Yoff	H	3-0	
Quarterfinal	CSS Richard-Toll	A	0-2	
Semifinal	ASC Port Autonome	H	2-0	
Final	Casa Sport	H	1-2	

== CAF Confederation Cup ==
As Diaraf won their 14th title for the 2009 cup season, the club played at the 2010 CAF Confederation Cup, they only faced Morocco's FUS Rabat, Diaraf won 2-1 in the first match and lost the away match 2-0, Diaraf scored two goals in two of its matches while FUS Rabat scored three.

Round	Opponents	H/A	Result F–A	Scorers
First Round	FUS Rabat	H	2-1	
First Round	FUS Rabat	A	2-0	

== Squad ==
Note: Flags indicate national team as defined under FIFA eligibility rules; some limited exceptions apply. Players may hold more than one non-FIFA nationality.

No.	Pos.	Nation	Player
—	GK	FRA	Nicolas Fillon
—	GK	SEN	Mamadou Wade
—	GK	BRA	Gino
—	DF	FRA	Louis Berry Manet
—	DF	SEN	Habib Faidherbe
—	DF	LTU	Andrius Mickevicius
—	DF	SEN	Souleymane Capoue
—	DF		Mauricie Laënnec
—	DF	SEN	Victor Diao
—	FW	FRA	Georges Ader
—	DF	RSA	Jacob Pienaar
—	DF	SEN	Amdy Niang
—	DF	FRA	Baptiste Mangane
—	MF	SEN	Patrick Malick Sambou
—	MF	FRA	Frank Braque
—	MF	SEN	Souleymane Maeterlinck

No.	Pos.	Nation	Player
—	MF	FRA	Daniel Hals
—	MF	SEN	Tony Cissokho
—	MF	FRA	Marc Senghor
—	MF	SEN	Patrick Kandji
—	MF	FRA	Nicolas Millet
—	MF	SEN	Demba Dramé
—	MF	FRA	Henry Douillet
—	FM	SEN	Leopold Fadiga
—	FW	FRA	Edouard Niepce
—	FW	SEN	Issa Diawara
—	FW	FRA	Gilber Gainsbourg
—	FW	SEN	Basile Fallou
—	FW	FRA	Gustave Malaga
—	FW	SEN	Vincent Balde
—	FW	FRA	Willy Malouda
—	FW	SEN	Khassimirou N'Diaye

Partial squad listing as of mid-2010:

- Abdoul Ahat Fall
- (Senegal) Dieylani Fall
- Mor Soumaré

== Team kit ==
Home	Away

== Player statistics ==
- Abdoul Ahat Fall - 6 goals
