= 2017–18 Senegal Premier League =

Ligue 1
- Season: 2017–18
- Champions: ASC Jaraaf

The 2017–18 Ligue 1 is the 53rd season of top-tier football in Senegal and the tenth professional season. The season began on 25 November 2017 and ended on 17 June 2018.

== Final standings ==
Pos	Team	Pld	W	D	L	GF	GA	GD	Pts	Qualification or relegation
1	ASC Jaraaf (C)	28	18	7	3	46	21	+25	61	Champions
2	Génération Foot	28	15	5	8	48	24	+24	50	
3	ASC SONACOS	28	13	7	8	33	29	+4	46	
4	Teungueth FC	28	12	7	9	26	20	+6	43	
5	AS Douanes	28	12	7	9	28	24	+4	43	
6	Mbour Petite-Côte FC	28	10	10	8	37	34	+3	40	
7	ASCE La Linguère	28	8	15	5	15	19	−4	39	
8	AS Dakar Sacré-Cœur	28	10	8	10	33	25	+8	38	
9	Stade de Mbour	28	10	8	10	33	29	+4	38	
10	ASAC Ndiambour	28	9	11	8	29	28	+1	38	
11	Casa Sports	28	9	10	9	36	32	+4	37	
12	ASC Niarry Tally	28	11	3	14	32	36	−4	36	
13	Diambars FC (R)	28	6	14	8	27	28	−1	32	Relegated
14	US Ouakam (R)	28	3	6	19	19	57	−38	15	Relegated
15	Guédiawaye FC (R)	28	2	6	20	14	50	−36	12	Relegated

(C) Champions; (R) Relegated

== See also ==
- 2018 Senegal FA Cup
