= 2003–04 Division 1 (Senegal) =

Division 1
- Season: 2003-04
- Champions: ASC Diaraf
- Runner up: AS Douanes
- Promoted: ASC Saloum; US Gorée; Casa Sport; ASC Khombole; US Ouakam; Guédiawaye FC
- Relegated: ASC Linguère; AS Khombole; AS Police; ASFA Dakar
- Matches: 380
- Goals: 590 (1.55 per match)
- Top goalscorer: (Senegal) Papé Ciré Dia (16)

The 2003-04 Division 1 season was the 39th of the competition of the first-tier football in Senegal. The tournament was organized by the Senegalese Football Federation. The season began on 13 December 2003 and finished on 9 October 2004. ASC Diaraf won the tenth title, the next club in Senegal to win the tenth title after ASC Jeanne d'Arc last season. The total number of national championship titles would remain tied with ten until Diaraf retook the totals as they won their eleventh and recent in the 2010 season. Diaraf along with AS Douanes would compete in the 2005 CAF Champions League the following season. ASEC Ndiambour participated in the 2005 CAF Confederation Cup, as AS Douanes also won the 2004 Senegalese Cup and were second place in the league, as Douanes qualified into the 2005 CAF Champions League, Dakar Université Club, the fourth place club participated in the 2005 CAF Confederation Cup.

The season would be a record-breaking season and the only season featuring twenty clubs. A record of 380 matches were played and 590 goals were scored more than double than last season.

ASC Jeanne d'Arc was the defending team of the title. Diaraf achieved a record 72 points, second Douanes with 69 points and 65 and third ASEC Ndiambour with 65 points.

The following season would feature eighteen clubs in which four clubs were relegated to Division 2.

== Participating clubs ==
- ASC Linguère
- Compagnie sucrière sénégalaise (Senegalese Sugar Company)
- ASC Port Autonome
- AS Douanes
- ASC Jeanne d'Arc
- ASFA Dakar
- AS Police
- ASC Saloum
- US Gorée
- Casa Sport
- ASC HLM
- ASC Diaraf
- US Rail
- Dakar Université Club
- SONACOS
- ASEC Ndiambour
- Stade de Mbour
- AS Khombole
- US Ouakam
- Guédiawaye FC

== Overview ==
The league was contested by 20 teams with ASC Diaraf again winning the championship.

== League standings ==
Pos	Team	Pld	W	D	L	GF	GA	GD	Pts
1	ASC Diaraf	38	20	12	6	54	22	+32	72
2	AS Douanes	38	19	12	7	37	16	+21	69
3	ASEC Ndiambour	38	19	8	11	29	20	+9	65
4	Dakar Université Club	38	18	9	11	41	27	+14	63
5	SONACOS	38	14	17	7	32	19	+13	59
6	Compagnie sucrière sénégalaise	38	13	16	9	29	25	+4	55
7	US Rail	38	14	13	11	36	36	0	55
8	US Gorée	38	13	15	10	32	21	+11	54
9	ASC Jeanne d'Arc	38	13	14	11	41	26	+15	53
10	ASC Port Autonome	38	13	13	12	29	26	+3	52
11	Casa Sport	38	15	7	16	23	22	+1	52
12	Guédiawaye FC	38	12	16	10	35	38	-3	52
13	ASC HLM	38	11	18	9	26	22	+4	51
14	US Ouakam	38	11	15	12	27	27	0	48
15	Stade de Mbour	38	10	16	12	24	29	-5	46
16	ASC Saloum	38	12	10	16	29	36	-7	46
17	ASC Linguère	38	11	12	25	19	26	-7	46
18	ASC Khombole	38	8	6	24	17	50	-33	30
19	AS Police	38	4	16	18	19	46	-37	28
20	ASFA Dakar	38	3	9	26	11	56	-45	18

2005 CAF Champions League
2005 CAF Confederation Cup
Relegation to Division 2

Division 1 2003-04
Champions
ASC Diaraf
10th title
