= 2014–15 Ligue 1 (Senegal) =

Ligue 1
- Season: 2014-15
- Champions: AS Douanes
- Runner up: NGB ASC Niarry Tally
- Promoted: AS Douanes; Guédiawaye FC
- Relegated: AS Pikine; ASC Port Autonome
- Matches: 182
- Goals: 348 (1.91 per match)

The 2014-15 Ligue 1 season was the 52nd of the competition of the first-tier football in Senegal and the seventh professional season. The tournament was organized by the Senegalese Football Federation. The season began earlier on 6 December and finished later on 26 July. It was the seventh season labelled as a "League" ("Ligue" in French). AS Douanes won their sixth and recent title and qualified into the 2016 CAF Champions League. Génération Foot, winner of the 2015 Senegalese Cup qualified for the first time in the 2016 CAF Confederation Cup the following season.

The season featured 14 clubs, of which five were outside the Dakar area, though SUNEOR Diourbel played in Dakar, every club that participated were in the western third of Senegal, It also had 182 matches and fewer goals which numbered 348, four higher than last season.

AS Pikine was the defending team of the title.

== Participating clubs ==

Participating football (soccer) clubs of the 2014-15 Senegalese Ligue 1 (Senegal)

=== Stadiums and locations ===
Club	Location	2013-14 positions
Casa Sport	Ziguinchor	3rd
Diambars FC	Saly Portudal	9th
ASC Diaraf	Dakar	2nd
AS Douanes	Dakar	Promoted from Ligue 2
Guédiawaye FC	Guédiawaye	Promoted from Ligue 2
ASC Linguère	Saint-Louis	8th
Mbour Petite-Côte FC	Mbour	11th
Stade Mbour	Mbour	7th
Olympique de Ngor	Dakar - Ngor	10th
NGB ASC Niarry Tally	Dakar	5th
US Ouakam	Dakar - Ouakam	6th
AS Pikine	Pikine	Champion
ASC Port Autonome	Dakar	4th
ASC SUNEOR	Diourbel	12th

Touré Kunda (or Kounda) Foot Pro, also as ASC Touré Kunda (or Kounda) became Mbour Petite-Côte FC

== Overview ==
The league was contested by 14 teams.

== League standings ==
Pos	Team	Pld	W	D	L	GF	GA	GD	Pts
1	AS Douanes	26	11	10	5	30	19	+11	43
2	NGB ASC Niary Tally	26	10	13	3	34	23	+11	43
3	ASC SUNEOR	26	12	6	8	27	26	+1	42
4	Diambars FC	26	10	9	7	26	18	+8	39
5	Stade Mbour	26	11	6	9	25	26	-1	39
6	Casa Sport	26	11	8	7	22	17	+5	35
7	Mbour Petite-Côte FC	26	9	10	7	26	21	+5	35
8	US Ouakam	26	8	9	9	24	41	+3	33
9	ASC La Linguère	26	7	12	7	30	33	-3	33
10	Guédiawaye FC	26	7	10	9	24	25	-1	31
11	ASC Diaraf	26	7	8	11	27	31	-4	29
12	Olympique de Ngor	26	6	10	10	22	27	-5	28
13	AS Pikine	26	6	10	10	17	26	-9	28
14	ASC Port Autonome	26	4	8	14	14	35	-21	20

Qualification into the 2016 CAF Champions League
Relegation to Ligue 2

Ligue 1 2014-15
Champions
AS Douanes
6th title
