= ASC Saloum =

Senegalese football club

- Full name: Association Sportive et Culturelle Saloum
- Founded: 1996
- Ground: Stade Lamine Guèye; Kaolack, Senegal
- Capacity: 8,000
- League: Senegal Nationale 1
- 2014/15: 13th, Ligue 2
Home colours	Away colours

Association Sportive et Culturelle Saloum is a Senegalese football club based in Kaolack.

Its uniform colors features a red-black striped t-shirt with red-edged black shorts and socks with red stripes on top used during home games and a white t-shirt with red sleeves and black rims and white for the rest of the clothing used during away and alternate games.

== History ==
The club was founded in 1997 in the city of Kaolack after the merger of AS Kaolack and ASC Mbossé Kaolack. The club is named after Saloum, the former kingdom once existed during the pre-colonial times.

Before the merger, ASC Mbossé Kaolack appeared in the national division in the early 1990s and participated until 1994. that time, the club finished in the lower positions for some seasons until they were relegated in 1994.

The club first appeared in 2004 in the top division in Senegalese football and played up to the 2010 season and was relegated to the Ligue 2. The club was in the last positions in the early season but reached 2nd in Group A in 2007 and in the final phase finished second behind Diaraf with 15 points. The club was in the mid to low positions in the remaining three seasons and was finally relegated in 2010 after being 9th in Group B. Their home stadium is Stade Lamine Guèye. Saloum has now been relegated into Nationale 1 in the 2015 season, the club finished 13th and were in the relegation zone.

The club appeared in the Senegalese Cup final in 2000 and was their only appearance. Saloum lost to ASC Port Autonome 4–0.

Their first appearance in the League Cup was in 2009 and their final appearance was the 2015 edition. In 2009, the club lost 3–0 to Casa Sports in the 1/8 final and in 2010, the club defeated US Gorée which made their first League Cup win, they lost their second match to AS Pikine.

As a second qualifier as second place in the final phase of the 2007 Division 1, the club entered the CAF Champions League for 2008 and the club only played in the preliminaries, the club lost to Tunisia's Club Africain. The club scored only a goal.

== League and cup history ==
=== Performance in CAF competitions ===
ASC Saloum's results in CAF competition
Season	Competition	Qualification method	Round	Opposition	Home	Away	Aggregate
2008	CAF Champions League	Division 1 runner-up	Preliminary Round	(Tunisia) Club Africain	0–1	2–1	1–3

=== As Mbosse-Kaolack ===
Season	Div.	Pos.	Pl.	W	D	L	GS	GA	GD	P	Cup	AN Cup	Notes	Final Phase
1981	1	12	26	6	10	10	18	28	-10	23	Finalist			
1984	1	13	26	-	-	-	-	-	-	28				
1990-91	1	12	30	5	15	10	18	26	-8	25				
1991-92	1	12	30	5	18	7	9	18	-9	28				
1992-93	1	8	36	-	-	-	-	-	-	52	Winner			
1994			-	-	-	-	-	-	-	-				

=== As ASC Saloum ===
Season	Div.	Pos.	Pl.	W	D	L	GS	GA	GD	P	Cup	League Cup	Notes	Final Phase
2003-04	1	16	38	12	10	16	29	36	-7	46				
2005	1	15	34	9	12	13	26	30	-4	39				
2006	1B	7	16	4	5	7	10	15	-5	17			Did not advance	Did not participate
2007	1A	2	16	8	5	3	14	9	+5	29			Advanced into the Second Phase	
2007	1A	2	10	4	3	3	11	7	+4	15			2nd place	
2008	1B	7	17	3	8	6	12	19	-7	17			Did not advance to the Final Phase	Did not participate
2009	1B	5	16	4	6	6	13	17	-4	18		1/4 final	Did not advance to the Final Phase	Did not participate
2010	1B	9	16	3	5	8	8	18	-10	14		Quarterfinals	Relegated into Ligue 2	Did not participate
2014-15	2	13	-	-	-	-	-	-	-	-			Relegated into Nationale 1	

== Statistics ==
- Best position: Preliminary Round (continental)
- Best position at cup competitions: Finalist (national)
- Highest number of wins in a season: 12, in 2004
- Highest number of goals in a season: 29, in 2004
- Highest number of points in a season: 46, in 2004
- Total matches played at the CAF Champions League: 2
- Total number of goals scored at the CAF Champions League: 1
- Highest number of goals conceded in a season: 36, in 2004

== Current squad ==
Note: Flags indicate national team as defined under FIFA eligibility rules; some limited exceptions apply. Players may hold more than one non-FIFA nationality.

No.	Pos.	Nation	Player
—	MF	SEN	Babacar Tine

== Notable players ==
- (Senegal) Papy Mison Djilobodji
- (Senegal) Sergine Ibrahima Moreau
