= 2021–22 Senegal Ligue 1 =

Ligue 1
- Season: 2021–22
- Champions: Casa Sports
- Champions League: Casa Sports
- Matches: 182
- Goals: 310 (1.7 per match)

The 2021—22 Ligue 1 was a season of top-flight football in Senegal.

Casa Sports won the title for the second time and first since 2012 after drawing 1–1 against Teungueth FC on the second-to-last match day. The champions also won the double, defeating l'Etoile Lusitana 3–0 in the cup final to go with their league championship.

ASAC Ndiambour were relegated on the final day of the season after losing to AS Pikine after keeping their hopes alive with a win in the penultimate matchday. ASAC Ndiambour departed Ligue 1 after a four-season stay. Mbour Petite-Côte FC were confirmed relegated after a 2–1 defeat to CNEPS Thiès in round 24, exiting the top flight for the first time since 2012.

== League Table ==
Pos	Team	Pld	W	D	L	GF	GA	GD	Pts	Qualification or relegation
1	Casa Sports (C)	26	12	11	3	30	17	+13	47	Champions, Qualification to the 2022–23 CAF Champions League
2	ASC Jaraaf	26	12	9	5	29	17	+12	45	
3	Génération Foot	26	11	9	6	34	18	+16	42	
4	Guédiawaye FC	26	11	8	7	29	28	+1	41	
5	AS Douanes	26	11	5	10	20	23	−3	38	
6	AS Pikine	26	9	10	7	28	22	+6	37	
7	Teungueth FC	26	8	12	6	28	20	+8	36	
8	Diambars FC	26	9	7	10	23	18	+5	34	
9	Dakar Sacré-Cœur	26	7	11	8	16	15	+1	32	
10	ASCE La Linguère	26	7	10	9	14	18	−4	31	
11	CNEPS Thiès	26	8	6	12	15	25	−10	30	
12	US Gorée	26	7	8	11	17	24	−7	29	
13	ASAC Ndiambour (R)	26	6	8	12	14	29	−15	26	Relegation
14	Mbour Petite-Côte FC (R)	26	4	6	16	13	36	−23	18	Relegation

Source: Soccerway
Rules for classification: 1) points; 2) goal difference; 3) number of goals scored.
(C) Champions; (R) Relegated
