= 2009 Ligue 1 (Senegal) =

Ligue 1
- Season: 2009
- Champions: ASC Linguère (1st title)
- Runner up: Casa Sport
- Promoted: Renaissance sportive de Yoff; Compagnie sucrière sénégalaise
- Relegated: ASC Thiès; CNEPS Excellence; ASC Xam Xam; ASC Renaissance de Dakar
- Matches: 130
- Goals: 227 (1.75 per match)
- Top goalscorer: (Senegal) Serigne Cheik Diouck (8)

The 2009 Ligue 1 season was the 44th of the competition of the first-tier football in Senegal and the second professional season. The tournament was organized by the Senegalese Football Federation. The season began a little earlier on 2 May and finished on 31 October. It was the first season labelled as a "League" ("Ligue" in French). ASC Linguère won their first and only title, the next club to win three consecutive titles, and a year later would compete in the 2010 CAF Champions League. ASC Diaraf who won the 2008 Senegalese Cup participated in the 2009 CAF Confederation Cup. Since that season, only one club each would qualify into the continental championship or cup, the winner of each. The West African Cup was again revived and brought two clubs, a second place club from Ligue 1 and a second placed Senegalese Cup club.

The season would have feature 20 clubs, 18 clubs competed instead as ASC Thiès and CNEPS Excellence forfeited the season. A total of 128 matches and the playoff system, again, in several seasons, two matches that decided the winner in the most goals, or if a match is scoreless, penalty shootouts. The season scored a total of 227 goals, 101 in Group A and 126 in Group B, no goals scored in the finals which finished in penalty shootouts in the second leg.

AS Douanes again was the defending team of the title.

== Participating clubs ==
- Renaissance sportive de Yoff
- ASC Linguère
- ASC Port Autonome
- AS Douanes
- ASC Jeanne d'Arc
- ASC Saloum
- US Gorée
- Casa Sport
- ASC Yakaar
- ASC Xam Xam
- Compagnie sucrière sénégalaise (Senegalese Sugar Company)
- ASC HLM
- ASC Diaraf
- ASC Thiès - forfeited
- CNEPS Excellence - forfeited
- Dakar Université Club
- ASC SUNEOR
- ASEC Ndiambour
- Stade de Mbour
- US Ouakam
- Guédiawaye FC

== Overview ==
The league was contested by 18 teams and two groups, each group contained ten clubs and a final match.

== League standings ==
=== Group A ===
Pos	Team	Pld	W	D	L	GF	GA	GD	Pts
1	ASC Linguère	16	9	7	0	16	3	+13	34
2	ASC Diaraf	16	6	6	4	15	10	+5	24
3	ASC HLM	16	6	6	4	12	8	+4	24
4	Compagnie Sucrière sénégalaise	16	5	7	4	12	11	+1	22
5	US Ouakam	16	6	3	7	11	10	+1	21
6	AS Douanes	16	5	5	6	12	10	+2	20
7	ASC Yakaar	16	4	5	7	9	19	-9	17
8	Dakar Université Club	16	3	7	6	9	13	-4	16
9	ASEC Ndiambour	16	2	6	8	5	18	-3	16

=== Group B ===
Pos	Team	Pld	W	D	L	GF	GA	GD	Pts
1	Casa Sport	16	9	5	2	26	15	+11	32
2	Stade de Mbour	16	9	4	3	15	8	+7	31
3	US Gorée	16	7	7	2	18	10	+8	28
4	Guédiawaye FC	16	7	4	5	16	11	+5	25
5	ASC Saloum	16	4	6	6	13	17	-4	18
6	Renaissance sportive de Yoff	16	4	5	7	8	13	-5	17
7	ASC Port Autonome	16	4	4	8	16	18	-2	16
8	ASC Jeanne d'Arc	16	3	6	7	8	13	-5	15
9	ASC SUNEOR	16	1	7	8	6	21	-15	10

Qualification into the final match
Qualification into the 2010 CAF Confederation Cup
Relegation to Ligue 2

=== Final phase ===
24 October 2009

Casa Sport	0:0	ASC Linguère

Stade Aline Sitoe Diatta
Ziguinchor
Referee: (Senegal) Yatma Mbengue

31 October 2009

ASC Linguère	0:0	Casa Sport
Penalties
	4-2

Stade Maître Babacar Sèye
Saint-Louis
Referee: (Senegal) Fadouma Dia

Ligue 1 2009
Champions
ASC Linguère
1st title

== Top scorers ==
	Scorer	Club	No. of goals
1	(Senegal) Serigne Cheikh Diouck	ASC Linguère	8
2	(Senegal) Damao Diatta	Casa Sports	7
3	(Senegal) Alpha Oumar Sow	Casa Sports	7
4	(Senegal) Cheikh A. Sow	ASC HLM	6
