= Sergine Ibrahima Moreau =

Senegalese footballer

Ibrahima Moreau
Personal information
- Full name: Sergine Ibrahima Moreau
- Date of birth: 25 February 1986 (age 40)
- Place of birth: Kaolack, Senegal
- Height: 1.88 m (6 ft 2 in)
- Position: Centre-back

Team information
- Current team: Mozzano
- Number: 25

Youth career
- ASC Saloum

Senior career*
Years	Team	Apps	(Gls)
2005–2006	ASC Diaraf		
2007	ASC Saloum		
2008	AS Douanes		
2009	ASC Diaraf		
2010–2011	Arquata	5	(0)
2011	Al-Karamah	3	(0)
2011–?	Mozzano	16	(0)
- * Club domestic league appearances and goals

Sergine Ibrahima Moreau (born 25 February 1986) is a Senegalese professional footballer, who plays as a centre-back for ASD Mozzano.

== Career ==
Moreau was born in Kaolack, Senegal.

=== Al-Karamah ===
In January 2011, Moreau signed for Syrian Premier League Club Al-Karamah on a five months deal. He played his first game for Al-Karamah on 22 February 2011 in the SPL match against Al-Futowa. The game ended 3–0 for Al-Karamah.

=== Return to Italy ===
In May 2011 Moreau returned to Italy. He resides in Rimini and joined to play for ASD Mozzano.
