= 2007 Division 1 (Senegal) =

Division 1
- Season: 2007
- Champions: AS Douanes (4th title)
- Runner up: ASC Saloom
- Promoted: Thiès FC; ASC Renaissance de Dakar
- Relegated: none
- Matches: 174
- Goals: 289 (1.66 per match)

The 2007 Division 1 season was the 42nd of the competition of the first-tier football in Senegal. The tournament was organized by the Senegalese Football Federation. The season began on 13 January and finished on 16 September. It was the last year they played at an amateur level, the following would be at a professional level. AS Douanes won their fourth title, the next club to win two consecutive titles. AS Douanes along with Saloum would compete in the 2008 CAF Champions League the following season. ASC Linguère (participated in Division 2) who won the 2007 Senegalese Cup participated in the 2008 CAF Confederation Cup, along with Casa Sport, third in the final phase. Under an undecided reason, not a single club was relegated as the number of clubs risen to twenty in the following season.

The season would feature 18 clubs. 174 matches (144 in the first phase and 30 in the second phase) were played and 289 goals were scored (229 in the first phase and 60 in the second phase). It was the second time that feature the first and second phases, the first phase featured the group system with a total of 72 matches for each group, the second or final phase would consist of six clubs with a larger total of 30 matches, each club played a total of ten matches and the highest number of points would decide the season's champion. This would be last season to do so, the playoff system would be restored in the following season.

AS Douanes was the defending team of the title.

== Participating clubs ==
- ASC Renaissance de Dakar
- ASC Port Autonome
- AS Douanes
- ASC Jeanne d'Arc
- ASC Saloum
- US Gorée
- Casa Sport
- ASC Yakaar
- ASC Xam Xam
- ASC HLM
- ASC Diaraf
- ASC Thiès
- Dakar Université Club
- ASC SUNEOR
- ASEC Ndiambour
- Stade de Mbour
- US Ouakam
- Guédiawaye FC

== Overview ==
The league was contested by 18 teams and two groups, the first phase consisted of 9 clubs in each of the two groups and the second and final phase consisted of only four clubs.

== League standings ==
=== Group A ===
Pos	Team	Pld	W	D	L	GF	GA	GD	Pts
1	AS Douanes	16	10	4	2	23	7	+16	36
2	US Ouakam	16	7	4	4	14	13	+1	25
3	ASC Xam Xam	16	6	5	5	18	16	+2	23
4	ASC Jeanne d'Arc	16	5	5	6	18	21	-3	20
5	ASC SUNEOR	16	4	6	4	9	7	+2	18
6	ASC Thiès	15	4	5	6	18	20	-2	17
7	ASEC Ndiambour	16	3	8	5	11	16	-5	17
8	ASC Port Autonome	16	5	2	9	10	17	-7	17
9	ASC HLM	16	2	7	7	8	16	-8	13

=== Group B ===
Pos	Team	Pld	W	D	L	GF	GA	GD	Pts
1	Stade de Mbour	16	8	6	2	20	10	+10	30
2	ASC Saloum	16	8	5	3	14	9	+5	29
3	Casa Sport	16	7	7	2	17	9	+8	28
4	Guédiawaye FC	16	4	7	5	11	10	+1	19
5	ASC Diaraf	16	5	3	8	10	18	-8	18
6	US Gorée	16	4	4	8	12	17	-5	16
7	Dakar Université Club	16	2	4	10	6	20	-14	10
8	ASC Renaissance de Dakar	16	3	4	10	5	19	-14	10
9	ASC Yakaar	16	2	4	10	5	20	-15	10

Qualification into the second phase

=== Second and final phase ===
Pos	Team	Pld	W	D	L	GF	GA	GD	Pts
1	AS Douanes	10	7	2	1	20	5	+15	23
2	ASC Saloum	10	4	3	3	11	7	+4	15
3	Casa Sport	10	3	4	3	8	7	+1	13
4	ASC Xam Xam	10	4	1	5	11	18	-7	13
5	Stade de Mbour	10	3	2	5	5	11	-6	11
6	US Ouakam	10	1	4	5	5	12	-7	7

2008 CAF Champions League
2008 CAF Confederation Cup

Division 1 2007
Champions
AS Douanes
4th title
