= Lamine Guèye =

Lamine Gueye may refer to:

- Amadou Lamine-Guèye (1891–1968), Senegalese politician
- Lamine Guèye (skier) (born 1960), Senegalese skier
- Lamine Gueye (footballer) (born 1998), Senegalese footballer
- Stade Lamine Guèye, multi-use stadium in Kaolack, Senegal

== See also ==
- Lamine-Gueye Koné (born 1989), Ivorian footballer
