= 1995 Division 1 (Senegal) =

Division 1
- Season: 1991-92
- Champions: ASC Diaraf
- Runner up: SEIB Diourbel
- Promoted: Damels Tivaouane
- Relegated: US Gorée; Damels Tivaouane
- Matches: 147
- Goals: 199 (1.35 per match)
- Top goalscorer: (Senegal) Kamine Sarr (Senegal) Moussa Diop (13)

The 1995 Division 1 season was the 30th of the competition of the first-tier football in Senegal. The tournament was organized by the Senegalese Football Federation. The season began in January and finished on 6 August 1995. ASC Diaraf won the eight title and participated in the 1996 African Cup of Champions Clubs the following year. AS Douanes participated in the 1996 CAF Cup, Entente Sotrac Ouakam in the 1996 CAF Winners' Cup and ASEC Ndiambour in the 1996 West African Cup.

ASEC Ndiambour was the defending team of the title. A total of 18 clubs participated in the competition (9 in each of the two groups, Group A and B), it would be the first time the group system would be used along with the playoff system with two matches in the semis and one in the final. The two leading teams succeeded to the playoff round. The season featured 289 matches and scored 199 goals. ASC Diamono and Entente Réveil Guet-Ndarou Mool came from the second division (Division 2).

== Participating clubs ==
- Espoirs de Bignona
- US Gorée
- Compagnie sucrière sénégalaise (Senegalese Sugar Company)
- ASC Port Autonome
- Sodefitex
- AS Douanes
- ASC Jeanne d'Arc
- ASFA Dakar
- Entente Sotrak Ouakam
- Entente Réveil Guet-Ndarou Mool
- ASC Diamono
- ASC Diaraf
- Stade de Mbour
- US Rail
- ASC Linguère
- ETICS Mboro
- SONACOS
- ASEC Ndiambour

== Overview ==
The league was contested by 18 teams (9 in Group A, 9 in Group B) with ASC Diaraf winning the championship. Due to an undetermined reason, ASC Jeanne d'Arc did not relegated.

== League standings ==
=== Group A ===
| Pos | Team | Pld | W | D | L | GF | GA | GD | Pts |
|---|---|---|---|---|---|---|---|---|---|
| 1 | ASC Diaraf | 16 | 8 | 5 | 3 | 23 | 12 | +11 | 29 |
| 2 | Entente Sotrac Ouakam | 16 | 8 | 5 | 3 | 21 | 12 | +9 | 29 |
| 3 | US Rail | 16 | 7 | 8 | 1 | 14 | 9 | +5 | 35 |
| 4 | ETICS Mboro | 16 | 7 | 4 | 5 | 12 | 9 | +3 | 25 |
| 5 | SONACOS | 16 | 5 | 5 | 6 | 11 | 15 | -4 | 20 |
| 6 | Espoirs de Bignona | 16 | 4 | 6 | 6 | 11 | 17 | -6 | 18 |
| 7 | SODEFITEX | 16 | 4 | 6 | 6 | 7 | 10 | -2 | 18 |
| 8 | ASC Diamono | 16 | 3 | 4 | 9 | 7 | 14 | -7 | 13 |
| 9 | ASC Jeanne d'Arc | 16 | 2 | 5 | 9 | 7 | 16 | -9 | 11 |

=== Group B ===
| Pos | Team | Pld | W | D | L | GF | GA | GD | Pts |
|---|---|---|---|---|---|---|---|---|---|
| 1 | ASEC Ndiambour | 16 | 8 | 6 | 2 | 15 | 4 | +11 | 30 |
| 2 | ASC Linguére | 16 | 7 | 4 | 5 | 9 | 5 | +4 | 25 |
| 3 | AS Douanes | 16 | 6 | 6 | 4 | 8 | 9 | +9 | 24 |
| 4 | Compagnie sucrière sénégalaise | 16 | 5 | 8 | 3 | 10 | 7 | +3 | 23 |
| 5 | US Gorée | 16 | 6 | 4 | 6 | 9 | 11 | -2 | 22 |
| 6 | ASFA Dakar | 16 | 4 | 9 | 3 | 6 | 5 | +1 | 21 |
| 7 | ASC Port Autonome | 16 | 3 | 9 | 4 | 6 | 8 | -2 | 18 |
| 8 | Stade de Mbour | 16 | 3 | 8 | 5 | 6 | 8 | -2 | 17 |
| 9 | Entente Réveil Guet-Ndarou Mool | 16 | 2 | 2 | 12 | 3 | 25 | -22 | 8 |

| 1996 African Cup of Champions Clubs |
| 1996 CAF Cup Winners' Cup |
| 1996 CAF Cup |
| 1996 WAFU Club Championship |
| Relegation to Division 2 |

== Final stages ==
=== Semi-finals ===
| ASC Diaraf | v | ASC Linguère |

| ASEC Ndiambour | v | Entente Sotrac Ouakam |

=== Final ===
| ASC Diaraf | 1:1 (a.e.t.) | Entente Sotrac Ouakam |
|---|---|---|
| Mamoume Diop 41'; Cissoko 112' | | Sène 35' (pen) |

Dakar

Division 1 1995
Champions
Winner
ASC Diaraf
8th title
