= 2005 Division 1 (Senegal) =

Division 1
- Season: 2005
- Champions: ASC Port Autonome
- Runner up: ASC Diaraf
- Promoted: ETICS Mboro; Renaissance sportive de Yoff
- Relegated: Renaissance sportive de Yoff; ETICS Mboro
- Matches: 306
- Goals: 519 (1.7 per match)
- Top goalscorer: (Senegal) Thiam (Senegal) Mbaye Ba

The 2005 Division 1 season was the 40th of the competition of the first-tier football in Senegal. The tournament was organized by the Senegalese Football Federation. The season began on 8 January and finished on 1 October. ASC Port Autonome won the third and their recent title. Port Autonome along with Diaraf would compete in the 2006 CAF Champions League the following season. AS Douanes who won the 2005 Senegalese Cup participated in the 2006 CAF Confederation Cup, along with Compagnie sucrière sénégalaise. The clubs that elevated into Division 1 would relegate do Division 2 as Renaissance sportive de Yoff was 17th and Mboro was 18th.

The season would feature 18 clubs. 306 matches were played and 519 goals were scored, fewer than last season, not a single club finished with a total of under 20 goals. The following season would feature the group and playoff system where two groups would have nine clubs each, this would be used for the next few seasons.

ASC Diaraf was the defending team of the title.

== Participating clubs ==
- Compagnie sucrière sénégalaise (Senegalese Sugar Company)
- ASC Port Autonome
- AS Douanes
- ASC Jeanne d'Arc
- ASC Saloum
- US Gorée
- Casa Sport
- ETICS Mboro
- Renaissance sportive de Yoff
- ASC HLM
- ASC Diaraf
- US Rail
- Dakar Université Club
- SONACOS
- ASEC Ndiambour
- Stade de Mbour
- US Ouakam
- Guédiawaye FC

== Overview ==
The league was contested by 18 teams with ASC Port Autonome again winning the championship.

== League standings ==
Pos	Team	Pld	W	D	L	GF	GA	GD	Pts
1	ASC Port Autonome	34	19	10	5	46	24	+22	67
2	ASC Diaraf	34	13	15	6	26	12	+14	54
3	Compagnie sucrière sénégalaise	34	12	13	9	35	24	+11	49
4	SONACOS	34	12	13	9	23	22	+1	49
5	Casa Sport	34	12	11	11	25	27	-2	47
6	ASC HLM	34	10	16	8	26	21	+5	46
7	US Gorée	34	11	13	10	30	27	+3	45/46
8	Dakar Université Club	34	10	15	9	34	27	+7	45
9	ASC Jeanne d'Arc	34	10	16	8	35	30	+5	44
10	Guédiawaye FC	34	9	17	8	20	24	-4	44
11	AS Douanes	34	9	16	9	29	21	+8	43
12	US Ouakam	34	10	11	13	30	37	-7	41
13	ASEC Ndiambour	34	9	14	11	23	30	-7	41
14	US Rail	34	10	11	13	31	41	-10	41
15	ASC Saloum	34	9	12	13	26	30	-4	39
16	Stade de Mbour	34	17	7	10	25	31	-6	38
17	Renaissance sportive de Yoff	34	8	13	13	29	37	-8	37
18	ETICS Mboro	34	6	7	21	26	56	-30	25

2006 CAF Champions League
2006 CAF Confederation Cup
Relegation to Division 2

Division 1 2005
Champions
ASC Port Autonome
3rd title
