= 2010 Ligue 1 (Senegal) =

Ligue 1
- Season: 2010
- Champions: ASC Diaraf (11th title)
- Runner up: Casa Sport
- Promoted: AS Pikine; ASC Niarry Tally
- Relegated: ASC Port Autonome; Stade de Mbour; Renaissance sportive de Yoff; ASC Saloum
- Matches: 130
- Goals: 257 (1.98 per match)
- Top goalscorer: (Senegal) Tendeng (9)

The 2010 Division 1 season was the 45th of the competition of the first-tier football in Senegal and the third professional season. The tournament was organized by the Senegalese Football Federation. The season began earlier on 20 February and finished on 7 August. It was the second season labelled as a "League" ("Ligue" in French). ASC Diaraf won their eleventh and recent title, and a year later would compete in the 2011 CAF Champions League. Touré Kunda who won the 2010 Senegalese Cup participated in the 2011 CAF Confederation Cup. ASC Niarry Tally (2nd place) and ASC HLM (2nd place of Group A) participated in the West African Cup for the last time.

The season would feature 18 clubs and as the final season would use the group and playoff system, the winner would be decided again by points in the following season. It had a total of 128 matches (84 each group) and the playoff system, and two final matches that decided the winner with the most goals. The season scored a total of 257 goals, 121 in Group A and 131 in Group B for a total of 252 in the regular season and 5 in the finals. The highest seasonal by club was Casa Sport of Group B, the lowest was Saloum of the same group.

ASC Linguère again was the defending team of the title.

== Participating clubs ==
- Renaissance sportive de Yoff
- ASC Linguère
- ASC Port Autonome
- AS Douanes
- ASC Jeanne d'Arc
- ASC Saloum
- US Gorée
- Casa Sport
- ASC Yakaar
- Compagnie sucrière sénégalaise (Senegalese Sugar Company)
- ASC HLM
- ASC Diaraf
- Dakar Université Club
- AS Pikine
- NGB ASC Niarry Tally
- ASEC Ndiambour
- Stade de Mbour
- US Ouakam
- Guédiawaye FC

== Overview ==
The league was contested by 18 teams and two groups, each group contained nine clubs and a final match.

== League standings ==
=== Group A ===
Pos	Team	Pld	W	D	L	GF	GA	GD	Pts
1	ASC Niarry Tally	16	9	5	2	19	9	+10	32
2	ASC HLM	16	7	5	4	16	14	+2	26
3	AS Douanes	16	5	8	3	13	12	+1	23
4	Dakar Université Club	16	5	8	3	15	10	+5	23
5	ASC Jeanne d'Arc	16	5	8	3	11	11	0	23
6	ASC Linguère	16	5	5	6	10	10	0	20
7	Compagnie sucrière senegalaise	16	4	6	6	14	15	-1	18
8	ASC Port Autonome	16	3	4	9	13	18	-5	13
9	Stade de Mbour	16	1	7	8	10	22	-12	10

Club	ASCL	CSS	ASCPA	HLM	ASD	SM	NITA	ASCJA	DUC
ASC Linguère		2-2	1-0	0-1	0-1	2-1	0-1	1-2	0-0
Compagnie sucrière sénégalaise	0-2		2-1	0-1	1-1	2-0	3-0	0-0	0-1
ASC Port Autonome	0-1	2-1		0-1	1-1	0-0	1-2	1-0	0-1
ASC HLM	1-0	0-2	2-1		1-1	2-0	0-2	1-1	1-1
AS Douanes	1-0	0-0	1-2	1-3		1-0	0-2	2-0	1-1
Stade de Mbour	0-0	0-0	1-1	2-1	1-1		2-2	2-3	0-0
NGB ASC Niarry Tally	0-0	0-0	2-1	2-0	0-1	2-0		0-0	1-1
ASC Jeanne d'Arc	0-0	2-1	0-0	1-1	0-0	1-0	0-1		1-1
Dakar Université Club	0-2	2-0	2-1	0-0	0-0	5-1	0-1	0-1	

=== Group B ===
Pos	Team	Pld	W	D	L	GF	GA	GD	Pts
1	ASC Diaraf	16	8	7	1	22	3	+19	31
2	Casa Sport	16	7	5	4	28	13	+15	26
3	US Ouakam	16	6	6	4	12	12	0	24
4	US Gorée	16	5	7	4	11	12	-1	22
5	ASC Yakaar	16	6	2	8	12	31	-19	20
6	AS Pikine	16	4	7	5	13	11	+2	19
7	Guédiawaye FC	16	4	6	6	11	15	-4	18
8	Renaissance sportive de Yoff	16	3	7	6	14	16	-2	16
9	ASC Saloum	16	3	5	8	8	18	-10	14

Club	DRF	SLM	YKR	Casa	GDW	Yoff	PKN	GOR	OUKM
ASC Diaraf		3-0	6-0	2-0	3-0	1-1	0-0	1-0	0-0
ASC Saloum	0-1		0-1	1-1	2-0	1-0	2-0	1-1	0-1
ASC Yakaar	0-0	4-0		0-7	1-0	0-3	2-1	0-1	0-2
Casa Sports	0-3	2-0	6-1		1-1	2-3	1-1	2-0	3-0
Guédiawaye	0-0	2-0	0-1	0-0		1-2	1-0	2-1	2-3
Renaissance sportive de Yoff	0-0	0-0	0-0	0-1	1-2		0-0	0-0	0-1
AS Pikine	0-1	2-0	3-0	0-0	0-0	2-1		1-2	1-1
US Gorée	1-1	0-0	1-0	1-0	0-0	3-2	0-0		1-0
US Ouakam	1-0	0-0	2-0	0-3	0-0	1-1	0-2	0-0	

Qualification into the final match
Qualification into the WAFU Club Championship
Relegation to Ligue 2

=== Final phase ===
30 July 2010

NGB ASC Niarry Tally	1:0	ASC Diaraf
Badiane 72'

Stade Demba Diop
Dakar
7 August 2010

ASC Diaraf	3:1	NGB ASC Niary Tally
Fall 19', 84'; Soumaré 55'		Sy 87'

Stade Demba Diop
Dakar

Ligue 1 2010
Champions
ASC Diaraf
11th title

== Top scorers ==
	Scorer	Club	No. of goals
1	(Senegal) Emile Paul Tendeng	Casa Sports	9
2	Ousmane Anne	ASC Port Autonome	7
3	Cheikh Ndiaye	Dakar Université Club	6
3	Abdou Ahat Fall	ASC Diaraf	6
