= 1990–91 Division 1 (Senegal) =

Division 1
- Season: 1990-91
- Champions: ASC Port Autonome
- Runner up: ASC Ndiambour
- Relegated: SEIB Diourbel
- Matches: 240
- Goals: 378 (1.58 per match)

The 1990-91 Division 1 season was the 27th of the competition of the first-tier football in Senegal. The tournament was organized by the Senegalese Football Federation. ASC Port Autonome won the second title and participated in the 1992 African Cup of Champions Clubs the following year. ASC Diaraf participated in the 1992 CAF Cup, ASEC Ndiambour in the 1992 CAF Winners' Cup and ASC Jeanne d'Arc in the 1992 West African Cup.

SEIB Diourbel was the defending team of the title. A total of 16 clubs participated in the competition. The season featured 450 matches and scored 429 goals. No new clubs came from the second division (Division 2).

== Participating clubs ==
- US Gorée
- SEIB Diourbel
- ASC Port Autonome
- Dialdiop SC
- AS Douanes
- ASC Jeanne d'Arc
- Casa Sports
- US Ouakam
- SIDEC Dakar
- ASC Diaraf
- Stade de Mbour
- US Rail
- ASC Linguère
- ETICS Mboro
- ASC Mbosse Kaolack
- ASEC Ndiambour

== Overview ==
The league was contested by 14 teams with ASC Port Autonome winning the championship.

== League standings ==
Pos	Team	Pld	W	D	L	GF	GA	GD	Pts
1	ASC Port Autonome	30	15	10	5	38	17	+21	30
2	ASEC Ndiambour	30	13	12	5	21	12	+9	38
3	SIDEC Dakar	30	13	11	6	31	18	+13	37
4	ASC Diaraf	30	12	12	6	36	20	+16	36
5	US Rail	30	9	18	3	18	10	+8	36
6	Casa Sports	30	8	18	4	19	14	+5	34
7	ASC Jeanne d'Arc	30	8	15	7	28	25	+3	31
8	US Gorée	30	7	16	7	22	19	+3	30
9	ASC Linguère	30	17	4	9	19	22	-3	28
10	ETICS Mboro	30	8	12	10	18	22	-4	28
11	AS Douanes	30	6	14	10	26	29	-3	26
12	ASC Mbosse Kaolack	30	5	15	10	18	26	-8	25
13	Stade de Mbour	30	7	10	13	19	31	-12	24
14	US Ouakam	30	7	10	13	19	31	-12	24
15	Dialdiop SC	30	8	7	15	23	40	-17	23
16	SEIB Diourbel	30	2	15	13	12	27	-15	19

1992 African Cup of Champions Clubs
1992 CAF Cup
1992 CAF Winner's Cup
1992 WAFU Club Championship
Relegation to Division 2

Division 1 1990-91
Champions
Winner
ASC Port Autonome
2nd title
