= 1991–92 Division 1 (Senegal) =

Division 1
- Season: 1991-92
- Champions: ASC Ndiambour
- Runner up: SEIB Diourbel
- Promoted: Damels Tivaouane
- Relegated: US Gorée; Damels Tivaouane
- Matches: 240
- Goals: 301 (1.25 per match)
- Top goalscorer: (Senegal) Kamine Sarr (Senegal) Moussa Diop (13)

The 1991-92 Division 1 season was the 28th of the competition of the first-tier football in Senegal. The tournament was organized by the Senegalese Football Federation. The season began in October 1991 and finished on 9 August 1992. ASEC Ndiambour won the first title and participated in the 1993 African Cup of Champions Clubs the following year. US Gorée participated in the 1993 CAF Cup, ASC Jeanne d'Arc in the 1993 CAF Winners' Cup and ASC Diaraf in the 1993 West African Cup.

SEIB Diourbel was the defending team of the title. A total of 16 clubs participated in the competition. The season featured 450 matches and scored 301 goals. No new clubs came from the second division (Division 2).

== Participating clubs ==
- US Gorée
- Damels Tivaouane
- ASC Port Autonome
- Dialdiop SC
- AS Douanes
- ASC Jeanne d'Arc
- Casa Sports
- US Ouakam
- SOTRAC Dakar
- ASC Diaraf
- Stade de Mbour
- US Rail
- ASC Linguère
- ETICS Mboro
- ASC Mbosse Kaolack
- ASEC Ndiambour

== Overview ==
The league was contested by 14 teams with ASEC Ndiambour winning the championship.

== League standings ==
Pos	Team	Pld	W	D	L	GF	GA	GD	Pts
1	ASEC Ndiambour	30	14	13	3	20	9	+11	41
2	ASC Jeanne d'Arc	30	15	9	6	27	10	+17	39
3	ASC Port Autonome	30	12	13	5	25	11	+14	37
4	ASC Linguère	30	13	11	6	19	8	+11	37
5	ASC Diaraf	30	11	13	6	31	17	+14	35
6	ETICS Mboro	30	7	18	5	21	16	+5	32
7	AS Douanes	30	8	15	7	22	16	+6	31
8	Stade de Mbour	30	6	18	6	16	13	+3	30
9	SOTRAC Dakar	30	9	11	10	23	21	+2	29
10	Casa Sports	30	6	16	8	12	14	-2	28
11	US Rail	30	9	10	11	16	22	-6	28
12	ASC Mbosse Kaolack	30	5	18	7	9	18	-9	28
13	Dialdiop SC	30	7	3	10	14	25	-11	27
14	US Ouakam	30	5	14	11	19	29	-10	24
15	US Gorée	30	4	10	16	17	31	-14	18
16	Damels Tivaouane	30	3	10	17	10	41	-31	16

1993 African Cup of Champions Clubs
1992 CAF Cup Winner's Cup
1993 CAF Cup
1993 WAFU Club Championship
Relegation to Division 2

Division 1 1991-92
Champions
Winner

ASEC Ndiambour
1st title
