= 2011 Ligue 1 (Senegal) =

Ligue 1
- Season: 2011
- Champions: US Ouakam (1st title)
- Runner up: ASC Diaraf
- Promoted: Touré Kunda; Dahra FC
- Relegated: ASC Jeanne d'Arc; ASC HLM
- Matches: 240
- Goals: 368 (1.53 per match)

The 2011 Ligue 1 season was the 46th of the competition of the first-tier football in Senegal and the fourth professional season. The tournament was organized by the Senegalese Football Federation. The season began earlier on 18 December 2010 and finished on 9 September 2011. It was the third season labelled as a "League" ("Ligue" in French). US Ouakam won their first and recent title, and a year later would compete in the 2012 CAF Champions League. ASC Diaraf, second place and the winner of the 2012 Senegalese Cup Casa Sport participated in the 2012 CAF Confederation Cup, it was the last time bringing a second place club, only the cup winner would participate in the following season.

The season would have feature 16 clubs and once again, the winner would be decided on the highest number of points, it was decided after the thirtieth match was finished. Not until the next season it would reappear in that format, the first and second phase system would reappear in the next season. The season scored a total of 368 goals. Casa sport had the highest total of 30 goals scored and the least was CSS Richard Toll with 15.

ASC Diaraf again was the defending team of the title.

== Participating clubs ==
- NGB ASC Niarry Tally
- ASC HLM
- AS Douanes
- ASC Jeanne d'Arc
- Dakar Université Club
- ASC Linguère
- Compagnie sucrière sénégalaise (Senegalese Sugar Company)
- ASC Touré Kunda
- ASC Diaraf
- Casa Sport
- US Ouakam
- US Gorée
- ASC Yakaar
- AS Pikine
- Guédiawaye FC
- Dahra FC

== Overview ==
The league was contested by 16 teams.

== League standings ==
Pos	Team	Pld	W	D	L	GF	GA	GD	Pts
1	US Ouakam	30	16	7	7	27	14	+13	55
2	ASC Diaraf	30	11	14	5	31	23	+8	47
3	Casa Sport	30	12	11	7	33	23	+10	47
4	ASC Linguère	30	9	18	3	27	20	+7	45
5	US Gorée	30	11	10	9	30	23	7	43
6	NGB ASC Niarry Tally	30	9	15	6	20	21	-1	42
7	ASC Touré Kunda	30	10	10	10	26	23	+3	40
8	AS Douanes	30	9	12	9	19	22	-3	39
9	Guédiawaye FC	30	9	12	9	21	21	0	39
10	Dakar Université Club	30	10	8	12	26	26	0	38
11	AS Pikine	30	7	16	7	21	19	+2	37
12	ASC Yakaar	30	8	11	11	18	21	-3	35
13	Dahra FC	30	7	11	12	17	25	-8	32
14	Compagnie sucrière sénégalaise	30	6	12	12	15	26	-11	30
15	ASC Jeanne d'Arc	30	6	11	13	18	30	-12	29
16	ASC HLM	30	4	14	12	19	30	-11	26

Qualification into the 2012 CAF Champions League
Qualification into the 2012 CAF Confederation Cup
Relegation to Ligue 2

Ligue 1 2010-11
Champions
US Ouakam
1st title
