= 2001–02 Division 1 (Senegal) =

Division 1
- Season: 2001-02
- Champions: ASC Jeanne d'Arc
- Runner up: SONACOS
- Promoted: ETICS Mboro; AS Police
- Relegated: US Gorée; ETICS Mboro
- Matches: 182
- Goals: 263 (1.45 per match)

The 2001-02 Division 1 season was the 37th of the competition of the first-tier football in Senegal. The tournament was organized by the Senegalese Football Federation. The season began on 20 October 2001 and finished on 6 May 2002. ASC Jeanne d'Arc won the ninth title and participated in the 2002 CAF Champions League the following year. AS Douanes participated in the 2002 CAF Cup of Cups and SONACOS in the 2002 CAF Winners' Cup.

ASC Jeanne d'Arc was ten points ahead of SONACOS and thirteen ahead of ASEC Ndiambour. ASC Jeanne d'Arc became the second and recent to have the total of nine, the total national championship wins were shared with Diaraf until Jeanne d'Arc won their tenth in the following season.

The season would again feature fourteen clubs.

ASC Jeanne d'Arc was the defending team of the title. The season featured 182 matches and scored 263 goals, more than last season.

== Participating clubs ==
- US Gorée
- Compagnie sucrière sénégalaise (Senegalese Sugar Company)
- ASC Port Autonome
- AS Douanes
- ASC Jeanne d'Arc
- ASFA Dakar
- AS Police
- ETICS Mboro
- ASC Niayès-Pikine
- ASC Diaraf
- US Rail
- Dakar Université Club
- SONACOS
- ASEC Ndiambour

== Overview ==
The league was contested by 14 teams with ASC Jeanne d'Arc again winning the championship.

== League standings ==
Pos	Team	Pld	W	D	L	GF	GA	GD	Pts
1	ASC Jeanne d'Arc	26	15	17	3	34	12	+22	52
2	SONACOS	26	11	9	5	32	21	+11	42
3	ASEC Ndiambour	26	10	9	6	18	15	+3	39
4	US Rail	26	9	11	5	18	13	+5	38
5	AS Douanes	26	8	11	6	15	11	+4	33
6	ASC Diaraf	26	8	9	8	16	20	-4	33
7	Stade de Mbour	26	6	13	5	20	18	+2	31
8	AS Police	26	7	10	8	22	21	+1	31
9	Compagnie sucrière sénegalaise	26	5	15	5	16	15	+1	30
10	Dakar Université Club	26	5	13	7	15	16	-1	28
11	ASC Port Autonome	26	6	9	10	19	26	-7	27
12	ASFA Dakar	26	4	13	7	11	20	-9	25
13	US Gorée	26	1	14	10	10	22	-12	17
14	ETICS Mboro	26	0	15	10	17	33	-16	15

2000 CAF Champions League
2000 Cup of Cups
2000 CAF Winner's Cup
Relegation to Division 2

Division 1 2001-02
Champions
ASC Jeanne d'Arc
9th title
