= 2013–14 Ligue 1 (Senegal) =

Ligue 1
- Season: 2013-14
- Champions: AS Pikine
- Runner up: ASC Diaraf
- Promoted: ASC SUNEOR; Stade Mbour
- Relegated: DUC; ASC Yeggo
- Matches: 182
- Goals: 345 (1.9 per match)

The 2013-14 Ligue 1 season was the 51st of the competition of the first-tier football in Senegal and the sixthprofessional season. The tournament was organized by the Senegalese Football Federation. The season began on 14 December and finished earlier on 21 June. It was the sixth season labelled as a "League" ("Ligue" in French). AS Pikine won their only title, and a year later would compete in the 2015 CAF Champions League. Olympique de Ngor the winner of the 2014 Senegalese Cup participated in the 2015 CAF Confederation Cup the following season.

The seasoning would have feature 14 clubs being reduced to 16 last season and saw the total matches reduced to 182 and fewer goals which numbered 344.

Diambars FC again was the defending team of the title.

== Participating clubs ==

Participating football (soccer) clubs of the 2013-14 Senegalese Ligue 1 (Senegal)

=== Information about the clubs ===
Club	Location	2013 positions
Casa Sport	Ziguinchor	6th
Dakar Université Club	Dakar	12th
Diambars FC	Saly Portudal	Champion
ASC Diaraf	Dakar	4th
ASC Linguère	Saint-Louis	7th
Stade Mbour	Mbour	2nd (Ligue 2)
Olympique de Ngor	Dakar - Ngor	2nd
NGB ASC Niarry Tally	Dakar	8th
US Ouakam	Dakar - Ouakam	11th
AS Pikine	Pikine	3rd
ASC Port Autonome	Dakar	5th
ASC SUNEOR	Diourbel	1st (Ligue 2)
ASC Touré Kunda	Mbour	9th
ASC Yeggo	Dakar	10th

== Overview ==
The league was contested by 14 teams.

== League standings ==
Pos	Team	Pld	W	D	L	GF	GA	GD	Pts
1	AS Pikine	26	14	7	5	30	12	+18	49
2	ASC Diaraf	26	13	9	4	36	22	+14	46
3	Casa Sport	26	11	8	7	32	18	+14	41
4	ASC Port Autonome	26	10	11	5	30	21	+9	41
5	NGB ASC Niary Tally	26	9	10	7	32	25	+7	37
6	US Ouakam	26	9	8	9	17	18	-1	35
7	Stade Mbour	26	8	10	8	25	25	0	34
8	ASC La Linguère	26	8	9	9	23	28	-5	33
9	Diambars FC	26	8	8	10	28	26	+2	32
10	Olympique de Ngor	26	8	8	10	19	32	-13	32
11	ASC Touré Kunda	26	5	13	8	16	22	-6	28
12	ASC SUNEOR	26	4	15	7	17	21	-4	27
13	DUC	26	4	15	7	17	21	-4	27
14	ASC Yeggo	26	2	11	13	13	37	-24	17

Qualification into the 2015 CAF Champions League
Qualification into the 2015 CAF Confederation Cup
Relegation to Ligue 2

Source : |title= 2013-14 Senegalese Ligue 1 season at the FIFA Website

Ligue 1 2013-14
Champions
AS Pikine
1st title
