= FC Djaraf =

F.C. Djaraf
- Full name: F.C. Djaraf
- Ground: Orfaso Namalota da Canchungo; Canchungo, Guinea-Bissau
- Capacity: 5,000
- League: Campeonato Assotiation da Guiné-Bissau
Home colours	Away colours

Futebol Clube Djaraf is a Bissau-Guinean football club based in Canchungo, a city located in the Cacheu Region in the northwest. They play in the 2 division in Guinean football, the Campeonato Nacional da Guiné-Bissau.

The club is named after the rulers during pre-colonial times, in Serer and in Canchungo (Wolof Jaraaf, Mandjak: approximately as Jarāf).

== See also ==
- ASC Diaraf, also known as Djaraf, sometimes as Jaraaf, a Senegalese club based in Dakar also named after the rulers of pre-colonial times
