= Stade Ely Manel Fall =

Sports venue in Diourbel, Senegal

- Location of the stadium
- Location: Diourbel, Senegal
- Coordinates: 14.6458°N 16.2296°W
- Capacity: 5,000
- Surface: Artificial turf

Tenants
- ASC SONACOS; Diamono Diourbel

Stade Municipal de Djourbel or Stade Ely Manel Fall is a multi-use stadium in Diourbel (sometimes as Djourbel), Senegal. It is currently used mostly for football matches and serves as a home ground of ASC SONACOS, also Diamono Diourbel plays at the stadium. The stadium holds 5,000 people.

One of the two continental matches was played at the stadium, the first three were the African Cup of Champions Clubs and the last was the CAF Champions League in 1981, 1984, 1988 and 1997. The last two were cup competitions played in 2002 and in 2003, the first was the African Cup Winner's Cup and the second was the CAF Cup.
