= 1981 Division 1 (Senegal) =

Division 1
- Season: 1981
- Champions: US Gorée
- Runner up: SEIB Diourbel
- Matches: 337
- Goals: 378 (1.12 per match)

The 1981 Division 1 season was the 18th of the competition of the first-tier football in Senegal. The tournament was organized by the Senegalese Football Federation. US Gorée won the second title and participated in the 1982 African Cup of Champions Clubs the following year. AS Police participated in the 1982 CAF Cup Winner's Cup and SEIB Diourbel in the 1982 West African Cup.

SEIB Diourbel (now SONACOS) was the defending team of the title. A total of 14 clubs participated in the competition. The season featured 337 matches, the match with Casa Sport and ASC Niayès was cancelled and scored 378 goals. No new clubs came from the second division (Division 2).

== Participating clubs ==
- US Gorée
- SEIB Diourbel
- ASC Niayes-Pikine
- AS Police
- US Rail
- ASC Jeanne d'Arc
- Casa Sports
- ASEC Ndiambour
- ASC Diaraf
- Stade de Mbour
- ASFA Dakar
- ASC Linguère
- Mbosse FC
- ASC Talba

== Overview ==
The league was contested by 14 teams with US Gorée winning the championship.

== League standings ==
| Pos | Team | Pld | W | D | L | GF | GA | GD | Pts |
|---|---|---|---|---|---|---|---|---|---|
| 1 | US Gorée | 26 | 13 | 10 | 3 | 37 | 20 | +17 | 36 |
| 2 | SEIB Diourbel | 26 | 14 | 5 | 7 | 33 | 15 | +18 | 33 |
| 3 | ASC Niayes-Pikine | 25 | 11 | 9 | 5 | 27 | 20 | +7 | 31 |
| 4 | AS Police | 26 | 12 | 4 | 10 | 33 | 28 | +5 | 28 |
| 5 | US Rail | 26 | 9 | 10 | 7 | 27 | 24 | +3 | 28 |
| 6 | ASC Jeanne d'Arc | 26 | 8 | 10 | 8 | 28 | 22 | +6 | 27 |
| 7 | Casa Sports | 26 | 6 | 14 | 5 | 22 | 20 | +2 | 26 |
| 8 | ASEC Ndiambour | 26 | 8 | 9 | 9 | 21 | 21 | 0 | 25 |
| 9 | ASC Diaraf | 26 | 8 | 8 | 10 | 34 | 32 | +2 | 24 |
| 10 | Stade de Mbour | 26 | 10 | 4 | 12 | 27 | 31 | -4 | 24 |
| 11 | ASFA Dakar | 26 | 8 | 7 | 11 | 29 | 34 | -5 | 23 |
| 12 | Mbosse FC | 26 | 6 | 10 | 10 | 18 | 28 | -10 | 23 |
| 13 | ASC Linguère | 26 | 5 | 11 | 10 | 18 | 24 | -6 | 21 |
| 14 | ASC Talba | 26 | 4 | 5 | 17 | 24 | 58 | -34 | 13 |

| 1982 African Cup of Champions Clubs |
| 1982 WAFU Club Championship |
| 1982 CAF Winner's Cup |
| Relegation to Division 2 |

Division 1 1981
Champions
Winner
US Gorée
2nd title
