= Olympique Thiès =

Senegalese football club

- Full name: Olympique Football Club de Thiès
- Ground: Stade Maniang Soumare; Thiès, Senegal
- Capacity: ?
- League: Senegal Second Division

Olympique Thiès is a Senegalese football club based in Thiès.

In 1964 and 1966 Olympique Thiès has won the Senegal Premier League.

== History ==
They played for many years in the top division the Senegal Premier League in Senegalese football.

== Stadium ==
Currently the team plays at the Stade de Thiès.

== Achievements ==
- Senegal Premier League: 5

1964, 1966
