= Association sportive et culturelle SONACOS =

Senegalese football club

ASC SONACOS
- Full name: Association sportive et culturelle SONACOS
- Nickname: Baols Baols
- Founded: 1950
- Ground: Stade Ely Manel Fall; Diourbel, Senegal
- Capacity: 5,000
- Chairman: El Hadji Bassirou Kandji
- Manager: Ismaïla Ndiaye
- League: Senegalese Ligue 2
- 2025–26: 15th, Ligue 1 (relegated)
Home colours	Away colours

Association sportive et culturelle SONACOS is a Senegalese football club based in Diourbel, which is part of the Senegal Second League or Ligue 2 (second tier) since mid 2016 after being relegated as they were 13th in Ligue 1 last season.

Djourbel is also sixth in the number of major honours won in Senegal numbering six, shared with AS Police of Dakar and Casa Sports of Ziguinchor, three were won as SEIB and the other three were won as SONACOS.

== History ==
The club was founded in 1950 in the city of Diourbel. Previously the club was called SEIB Diourbel (abbreviation of Société Électrique Industrielle du BAOL) until 1991 and SONACOS (abbreviation of Societé Nationale de Commercialisation de Óleagineux) until 2006. Their home stadium is Stade Municipal de Djourbel.

=== Championship history ===
Their first title was won in 1980, their second in 1983. The club relegated from Division 1 in 1991 under the new name of SONACOS as they were very last, they suddenly returned in the following year and continued to participate for the next sixteen years. Diourbel won their third and recent title under the name SONACOS in 1996 and finished with 52 points, their second highest in the national top level. It was one of the few clubs in the country would get the same number of points and the same for two years and were 10th and had 28 points in 1997 and 1998. Their greatest success was second place in 2002, the position fell to 10th in 2003, later the club finished in the top five positions between 2004 and 2005, when the group system was restored, they were in Group A for the first three seasons. The club changed its name to SUNEOR in 2007. SUNEOR was placed in Group B for the 2009 season and the club finished last place and was relegated to the newly renamed Ligue 2 for the next few seasons. The club returned to Ligue 1 after finished in the top two positions a couple of seasons later, they were 12th in 2014 and recently were 3rd in 2015, the club was 13th with 30 points and scored 17 goals, ahead of Olympique de Ngor and inside the relegation zone for the 2015–16 season, SUNEOR has been relegated to Ligue 2 for only one season. SUNEOR Djourbel finished second place in the Second Division behind Dakar-Sacre Coeur and returned once again to Ligue 1 for the 2017–18 season. In mid-season, they were in the top five positions, one time, they were third place.

=== Continental appearances ===
SUNEOR went to the African cup competition and faced Wydad Casablanca in their only appearance in the 2001 CAF Cup Winner's Cup in the first round, the first match was scoreless and lost 3–0 in the second match. SUNEOR went to another cup competition to the CAF Cup in 2003 and faced AS Kaloum Star of Guinea and the two matches were scores and won 4–2 in penalty shootouts and advanced up to the second round and challenged JS Kabylie from Algeria where all the matches ended in ties, the first with one goals each and the second without goals, they did not advance under the away goals rule. SUNEOR went to the continental competition for the first time in 1981, all did not advance up to the first round, they lost to ASEC Mimosas of the Ivory Coast in 1984 in penalty shootouts, Shooting Stars FC from Nigeria 2–0 in the second match in 1984, ASC Police 9–10 in penalty shootouts in 1987 and in 1997 as the CAF Champions League to Morocco's Raja Casablanca 3–1 in the second match.

=== Cup competitions ===
Their first cup appearance was in 1987 and faced ASC Jeanne d'Arc and lost 1–0, their second was in 1999 as SONACOS and challenged ASEC Ndiambour from Louga and the match was tied at one throughout and scored none in the penalty shootouts and lost the title to Ndiambour. Their third appearance was successful and defeated US Gorée 1–0 at extra time to win their only Senegal FA cup title in 2001. Their fourth and final appearance was futile in the following year, the cup match was equally tied one in its entirety, SONACOS scored only one penalty shootout and lost 4–1 to Douanes. The club won their only cup title from another competition in 2005, the Assemblée Nationale (National Assembly) Cup.

== Achievements ==
- Senegal Premier League: 4

1980, 1983, 1987 (as SEIB Diourbel)
1996 (as Sonacos)

- Senegal FA Cup: 1

2001

- Senegal Assemblée Nationale Cup: 1

2005

== League and cup history ==
=== Performance in CAF competitions ===
SEIB Diourbel/SONACOS results in CAF competition
Season	Competition	Qualification method	Round	Opposition	Home	Away	Aggregate
1981	African Cup of Champions Clubs	Senegalese National champions	First Round	(Ivory Coast) ASEC Mimosas	2–1	2–1	3–3 (3–4 p.)
1984	African Cup of Champions Clubs	Senegalese National champions	First Round	(Nigeria) Shooting Stars FC	1–0	2–0	1–2
1988	African Cup of Champions Clubs	Senegalese National champions	First Round	ASC Police	2–0	2–0	9–10 p.
1997	CAF Champions League	Senegalese National champions	First Round	(Morocco) Raja Casablanca	0–2	3–1	2–5
2002	CAF Cup Winners' Cup	Senegalese cup winners	First Round	(Morocco) Wydad Casablanca	0–0	3–0	3–0
2003	CAF Cup	Division 1, 2nd place	First Round	(Guinea) AS Kaloum Star	0–0	0–0	0–0 (4–2 p.)
2003	CAF Cup	Division 1, 2nd place	Second Round	(Algeria) JS Kabylie	1–1	0–0	1–1 a

=== Performance at the WAFU Club Championship ===
SEIB Diourbel results at the WAFU Club Championship
Season	Competition	Qualification method	Round	Opposition	Home	Away	Aggregate
1982	WAFU Club Championship	Division 1 Runner-up	Preliminary Round	(Sierra Leone) Mighty Blackpool	1–0	1–0	1–1 (2–4 p.)
1983	WAFU Club Championship	Division 1 Runner-up	Quarterfinals	(Ghana) Great Olympics	0–0	0–1	0–1
1986	WAFU Club Championship	Division 1 Runner-up	Preliminary Round	(Guinea-Bissau) SC Bissau	3–0	0–0	3–0
1986	WAFU Club Championship	Division 1 Runner-up	Quarterfinals	University of Benin FC	3–2	0–1	4–2
1986	WAFU Club Championship	Division 1 Runner-up	Quarterfinals	(Ghana) Asante Kotoko	2–2	2–0	2–4

=== National level ===
Season	Div.	Pos.	Pl.	W	D	L	GS	GA	GD	P	Cup	League Cup	AN Cup	Notes	Final Phase
1981	1	2	26	14	5	7	33	15	+8	33					
1982	1	2	26	-	-	-	-	-	-	-					
1984	1	3	26	-	-	-	-	-	-	33					
1985	1	2/3	26	-	-	-	-	-	-	-					
1990-91	1	16	30	2	15	13	12	27	-15	19				Relegated to Division 2	
1991-92	1		-	-	-	-	-	-	-	-					
1992-93	2	4	28	-	-	-	-	-	-	45					
1995	1A	5	16	5	5	6	11	15	-4	20				Did not advance	Did not participate
1996	1	1	-	-	-	-	-	-	-	52					
1997	1	10	26	-	-	-	-	-	-	29					
1998	1	10	26	-	-	-	-	-	-	29					
1999	1	4	26	8	12	6	21	18	+3	43					
2000	1	7	22	7	9	6	16	13	+3	30	Finalist				
2000-01	1	4	26	7	9	10	15	18	-3	30	Winner				
2001-02	1	2	26	11	9	5	32	21	+11	42	Finalist				
2002-03	1	10	26	6	12	8	16	21	-5	30					
2003-04	1	5	38	14	17	7	32	19	+13	59					
2005	1	4	34	12	13	9	23	22	+1	49			Winner		
2006	1A	5	16	3	10	3	7	10	-3	19				Did not advance	Did not participate
2007	1A	5	16	4	6	4	9	7	+2	18				Did not advance	Did not participate
2008	1A	8	18	3	9	6	9	16	-7	18				Did not advance	Did not participate
2009	1B	9	16	1	7	8	6	21	-15	10		1/16 final		Relegated to Ligue 2	Did not participate
2013	2	1	-	-	-	-	-	-	-	-				Promoted into Ligue 1	
2013-14	1	12	26	4	15	7	17	21	-4	27					
2014-15	1	3	26	12	6	8	27	26	+1	42					
2015-16	1	13	26	7	9	10	17	24	-7	30					

== Statistics ==
- Best position: First round (continental)
- Best position at a cup competition: Second Round (continental)
- Best position at the WAFU Club Championship: Semifinalist
- Highest number of wins in a season: 14 (national)
- Highest number of goals in a season: 33 (national)
- Highest number of points in a season: 59 (national)
- Total goals scored at a cup final: 2 - all as SONACOS
- Total matches played at the CAF Champions League: 8
  - Total matches played at home: 4
  - Total matches played away: 4
- Total number of wins at the CAF Champions League: 3
- Total number of goals scored at the CAF Champions League: 8
- Total matches played at cup competitions: 6
  - Total matches played at home: 3
  - Total matches played away: 3
  - Total matches played at the CAF Cup: 4
- Total draws at cup competitions: 5
