= ASC Port Autonome =

Senegalese football club

UCST Port Autonome
- Full name: Union Culturelle et Sportive des Travailleurs Port Autonome
- Ground: Stade Port Autonome,Dakar, Senegal
- Capacity: 4,000
- League: Senegal Premier League
- 2014–15: 14th
Home colours	Away colours

Union Culturelle et Sportive des Travailleurs Port Autonome is a Senegalese football club based in Dakar. Their home stadium is Stade Port Autonome. The club is named after the city and country's main shipping port the Autonomous Port of Dakar, it is also the ninth-busiest port in Africa.

Port Autonome also is ninth in the number of major honours won in Senegal numbering five, shared with ASC Linguère of Saint-Louis and Djambars FC.

== History ==
Their first title was won in 1990 and won their second straight in 1991. Their third and recent was in 2005. Port Autonome's first cup final appearance was in 1990 and faced ASC Linguère and lost 1–0. Their first and only cup title was won in 2000 after defeating ASC Saloum of Kaolack 4–0; this was Port Autonome's recent cup final appearance. Also in the same year they won their only Assemblée Nationale Cup.

The club was relegated in the 2010 season to the Senegal Ligue 2. They returned again to Ligue 1 in 2013 and remained until they were relegated in the 2014–15 season after finishing last with 20 points, eight behind AS Pikine and with 14 losses.

Port Autonome's first appearance in the League Cup was in 2009. The club advanced up to the quarterfinals and lost to AS Douanes 2–0. In the 2010 edition, the club advanced up to the semis and lost to ASC Diaraf 2–0. For a short time in late 2013, Casa Sport shared the number of honors won with Port Autonome; up to that time, Porto Autonome was ranked eighth.

== Achievements ==
- Senegal Premier League: 3

1990, 1991, 2005

- Senegal FA Cup: 1

2000

- Senegal Assemblée Nationale Cup: 1

2000

== League and cup history ==
=== Performance in CAF competitions ===
Port Autunome's results in CAF competition
Season	Competition	Qualification method	Round	Opposition	Home	Away	Aggregate
1991	African Cup of Champions Clubs	Senegalese champions	First Round	(Mali) Djoliba AC	0–0	1–0	0–1
1992	African Cup of Champions Clubs	Senegalese champions	Preliminary Round	(Cape Verde) Sporting Clube da Praia	0–0	0–0	0–0 (1–3 pen)
2001	CAF Cup	Senegalese cup winners	Preliminary Round	(Tunisia) Club Africain	1–1	1–0	1–2
2005	CAF Confederation Cup	Senegalese cup runner-up	Intermediate Round	(Angola) Petro Atlético	0–1	w/o	0–1
2006	CAF Champions League	Senegalese champions	Preliminary Round	(Togo) AS Douanes de Lomé	3–2	0–0	3–2
2006	CAF Champions League	Senegalese champions	First Round	(Algeria) USM Alger	2–1	3–2	4–4 (a)
2006	CAF Champions League	Senegalese champions	Second Round	(Ivory Coast) ASEC Mimosas	1–0	6–0	1–6

=== Performance at the WAFU Club Championship ===
ASC Port Autonome's results at the WAFU Club Championship
Season	Competition	Qualification method	Round	Opposition	Home	Away	Aggregate
1989	WAFU Club Championship	Division 1 Runner-up	Preliminary Round	(Benin) Requins de l'Atlantique FC	0–0	2–1	2–1
1989	WAFU Club Championship	Division 1 Runner-up	Quarterfinals	(Ivory Coast) ASEC Abidjan	1–1	2–1	2–3

=== National level ===
Season	Div.	Pos.	Pl.	W	D	L	GS	GA	GD	P	Cup	League Cup	Super Cup	Notes	Final Phase
1990-91	1	1	30	15	10	5	38	17	+21	40					
1991-92	1	3	30	12	13	5	25	11	+14	37					
1992-93	1	10	28	-	-	-	-	-	-	33					
1995	1B	7	16	3	9	4	6	8	-2	18					
1997	1	5	26	-	-	-	-	-	-	43				Did not advance to the Final Phase	Did not participate
1998	1	7	26	-	-	-	-	-	-	35					
1999	1	10	26	8	7	11	20	25	-5	31					
2000	1	2	22	9	9	4	21	12	+9	36	Winner		Winner		
2000-01	1	5	26	7	15	4	14	11	+3	36					
2001-02	1	5	26	6	9	10	19	26	-7	27					
2002-03	1	12	26	5	12	9	8	15	-7	27					
2003-04	1	10	38	13	13	12	29	26	+3	52					
2005	1	1	34	19	10	5	46	24	+22	67					
2006	1B	3	16	6	8	2	15	10	+5	26				Did not advance	Did not participate
2007	1A	8	16	5	2	9	10	17	-7	17				Did not advance to the Final Phase	Did not participate
2008	1A	5	18	7	5	6	20	16	+4	26				Did not advance to the Final Phase	Did not participate
2009	1B	7	16	4	4	8	16	18	-2	16		Quarterfinals		Did not advance to the Final Phase	Did not participate
2010	1A	8	16	3	4	9	13	18	-5	13		Semifinals		Relegated into Ligue 2	Did not participate
2011	2	8	-	-	-	-	-	-	-	-					
2012	2	1	-	-	-	-	-	-	-	-				Elevated into Ligue 1	
2013	1	5	30	11	12	7	27	17	+10	45					
2013-14	1	4	26	10	11	5	30	21	+9	41					
2014-15	1	14	26	4	8	14	14	35	-21	20				Relegated into Ligue 2	

== Statistics ==
- Best position: Second round (continental)
- Best position at cup competitions: Intermediate Round (continental)
- Highest number of goals in a season: 46 (national)
- Highest number of points in a season: 67 (national)
- Total goals scored at a cup final: 4 – all in 2000
- Total matches played at the CAF Champions League: 13
  - Total matches played at home: 7
  - Total matches played away: 6
- Total number of wins at the CAF Champions League: 3
  - Total home wins: 3
- Total draws at the CAF Champions League: 5
  - Total home draws: 3
  - Total away draws: 3
- Total number of goals scored at the CAF Champions League: 8
- Total number of goals scored at the African cup competition: 1

== Current and former players ==
- Mamadou Diallo
- (Senegal) Makhete Diop
- Pape Hamadou N'Diaye
- (Senegal) Joseph Niouky (played from 2006 until 2010)
- (Senegal) Makhtar Thioune

== See also ==
- Autonomous Port of Dakar (Port autonome de Dakar), the main Port of Dakar
