= Stade Lamine Guèye =

Multi-use stadium in Kaolack, Senegal

- Location within Senegal
- Location: Kaolack, Senegal
- Coordinates: 14.1347°N 16.0682°W
- Capacity: 8,000

Tenant
- ASC Saloum

Stade Lamine Guèye is a multi-use stadium in Kaolack, Senegal. As of 2017 it was used mostly for football matches and served as a home ground of ASC Saloum. The stadium holds 8,000 people.

In 2008, one of the two continental matches took place at the stadium.
