= Senegalese Super Cup =

- Founded: 1978
- Region: Senegal
- Teams: 2
- Current champions: US Gorée (2016)
- Most championships: ASC Diaraf (4 titles)

The Senegalese Super Cup is a Senegalese football competition, held as a game between the reigning champions of the Senegalese Premier League (Ligue 1) and the Senegalese Cup, it challenged a winner of the Senegalese League Cup, it once had a winner of Nationale 1 from 2009 to 2015. Up to 2015, it was known as the Senegal Assemblée Nationale Cup The first edition was held in 1978.

The 2017 edition will feature the first time Ligue 1 champion Génération Foot from Sangalkam, an area east of Dakar which has a fast growing population in the past two decades.

== Winners ==
Year	Winners	Score	Runners-up	Venue
1979	AS Police			
1981	AS Police			
1986	ASC Jeanne d'Arc			
1987	ASC Diaraf			
1989	ASC Jeanne d'Arc			
1991	ASC Diaraf			
1998	ASEC Ndiambour			
1999	not held			
2000	ASC Port Autonome	1–0	Djaraf	
2001	ASC Jeanne d'Arc		ASEC Ndiambour	
2002	ASEC Ndiambour	1–1 (7–6 pen.)	ASC Jeanne d'Arc	
2003	ASC Diaraf			
2004	ASEC Ndiambour	1–1 (5–4 pen.)	Djaraf	
2005	SONACOS			
2006	ASC Diaraf		AS Douanes	
2008	ASC Yakaar			
2010	Stade de Mbour			
2011	Diambars			
2012	Diambars			
2013	Diambars			
2014	Olympique de Ngor	2–2 (4–1 pen.)	Guédiawaye FC	Dakar
2015	AS Douanes			
2016	US Gorée			
2017	Génération Foot	2–0	Mbour Petite-Côte FC	Pikine

== Performance by club ==
Listed titles only

Club	Winners	Winning years
ASC Diaraf	4	1989, 1991, 2003, 2006
Djambars	3	2011, 2012, 2013
ASC Jeanne d'Arc	3	1986, 1989, 2001
ASEC Ndiambour	3	1998, 2002, 2004
AS Police	2	1979, 1981
AS Douanes	1	2015
US Gorée	1	2016
Olympique de Ngor	1	2014
ASC Port Autonome	1	2000
SONACOS (Note: Now known as SUNEOR)	1	2005
Stade de Mbour	1	2010
ASC Yakaar	1	2008
Génération Foot	1	2017

== See also ==
- Senegalese Ligue 1
- Senegalese Cup
- Senegalese League Cup
