= Guédiawaye =

- Town

- Location within Senegal
- Coordinates: 14°47′N 17°24′W
- Country: Senegal
- Region: Dakar Region

Area
  - Total: 13 km^{2} (5.0 sq mi)

Population (2013 census)
  - Total: 329,659
  - Density: 25,000/km^{2} (66,000/sq mi)
- Time zone: UTC+0 (GMT)

Guédiawaye is a city in the Guédiawaye Department of the Dakar Region of Senegal. Lying on the Atlantic Ocean to the northeast of Dakar city centre, in 2013 it had a population of 329,659. Until the mid-2000s, the département was part of Pikine.

== Administration ==
For administrative purposes the town is also a single arrondissement divided into 5 communes d'arrondissement which are (2013 population in brackets):

- Golf Sud (92,345)
- Sam Notaire (78,660)
- Ndiarème Limamoulaye (35,171)
- Wakhinane Nimzatt (89,721)
- Médina Gounass (33,762)

== History ==
The town was founded in the 1950s as a planned commuter town for the city of Dakar. It has a large covered market. A further, informal, community grew up adjacent to it from the 1960s.

Notable people from the town include the football goalkeeper Tony Sylva.

== Twin towns and sister cities ==
Guédiawaye is twinned with:

- Birmingham, Alabama, United States.
- (Western Sahara) Tifariti, Sahrawi Arab Democratic Republic.

== Image gallery ==
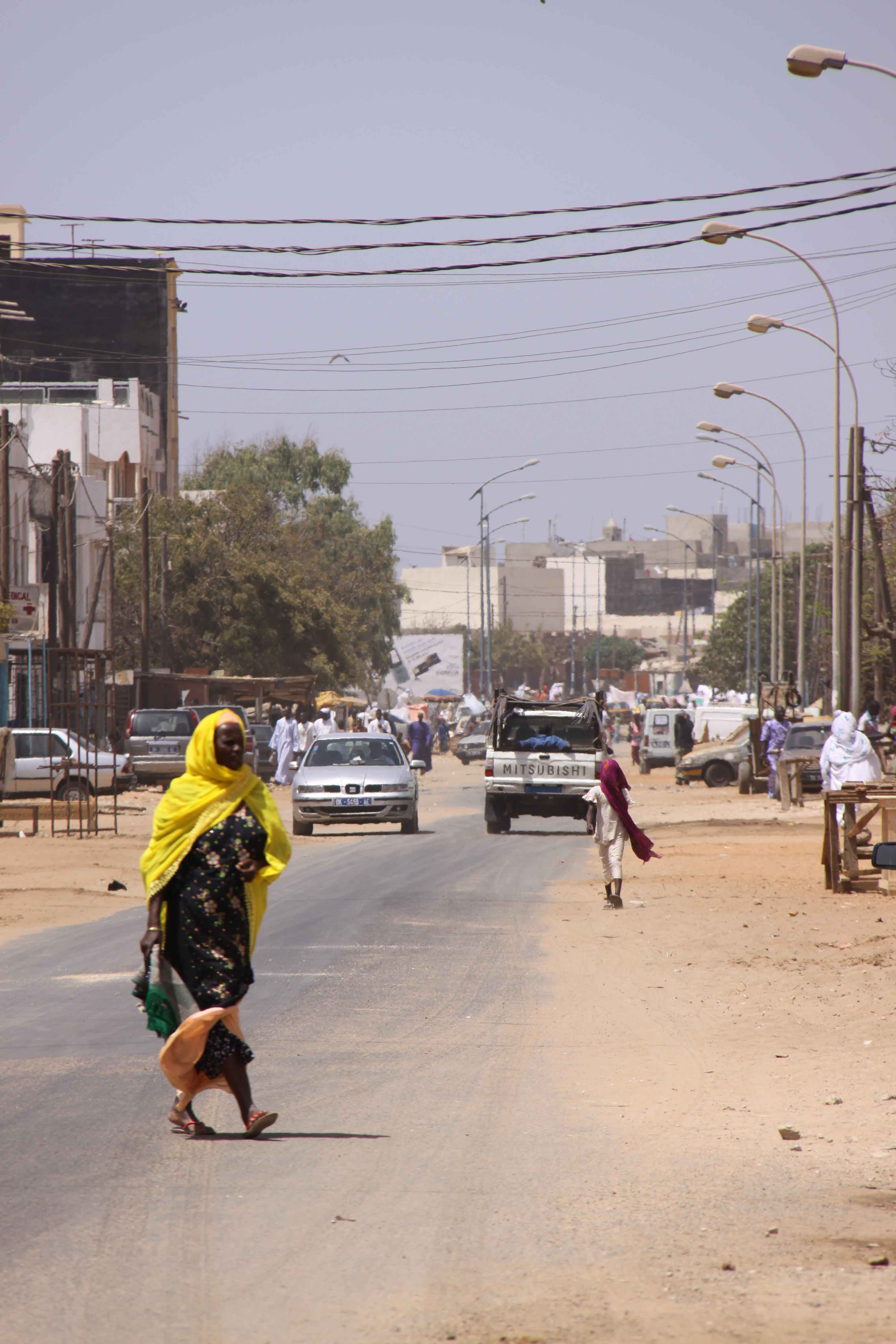
Streets in the town

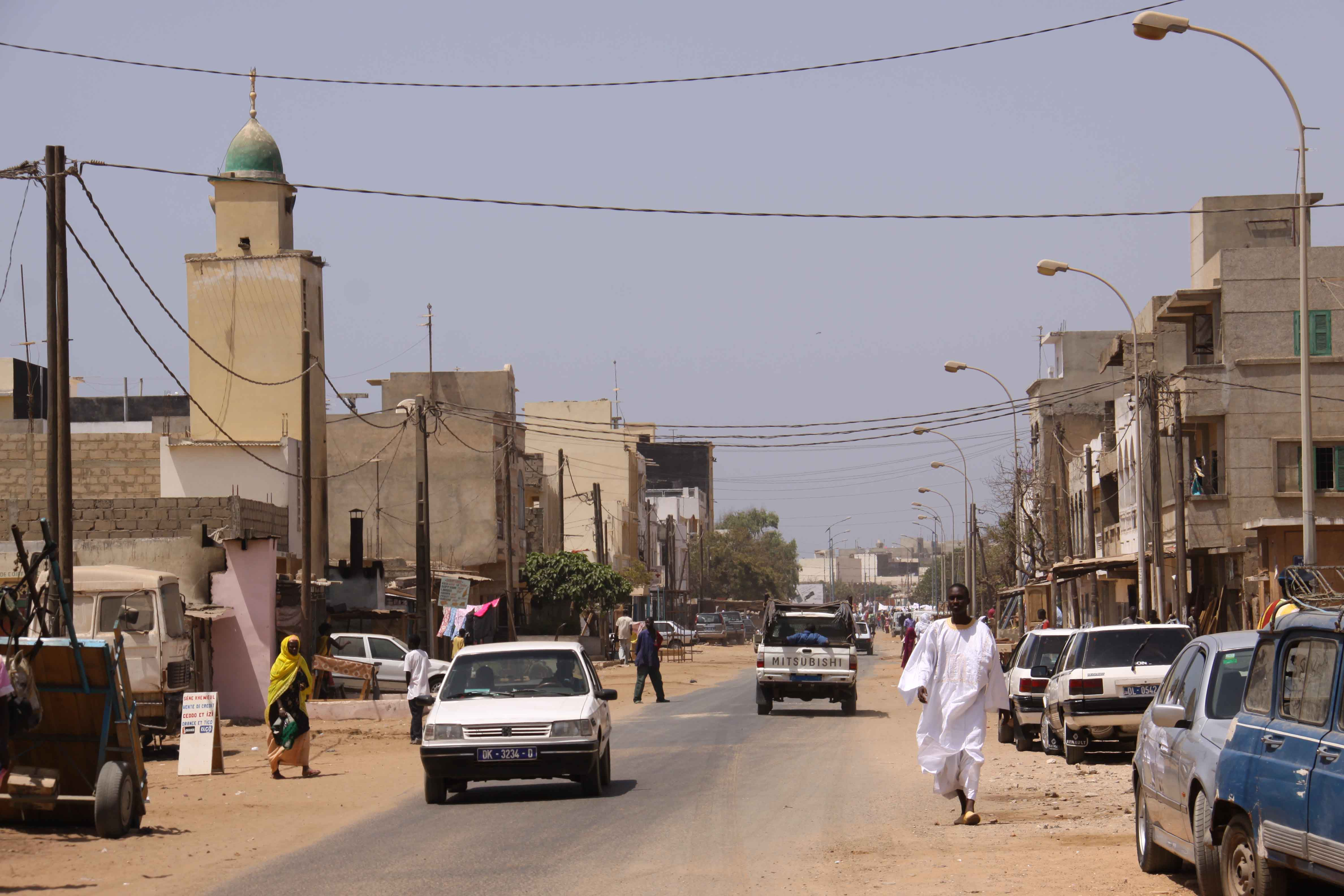

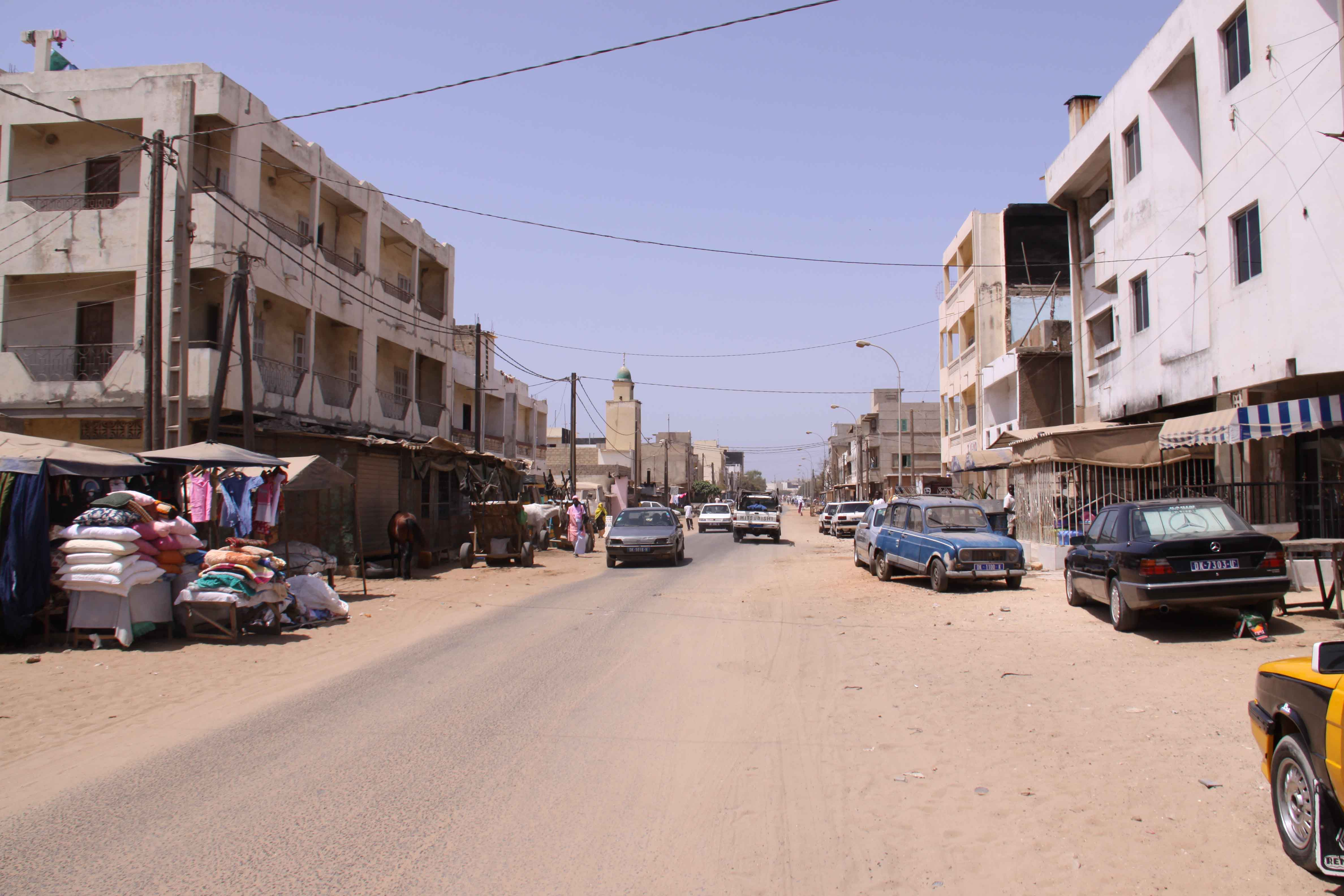

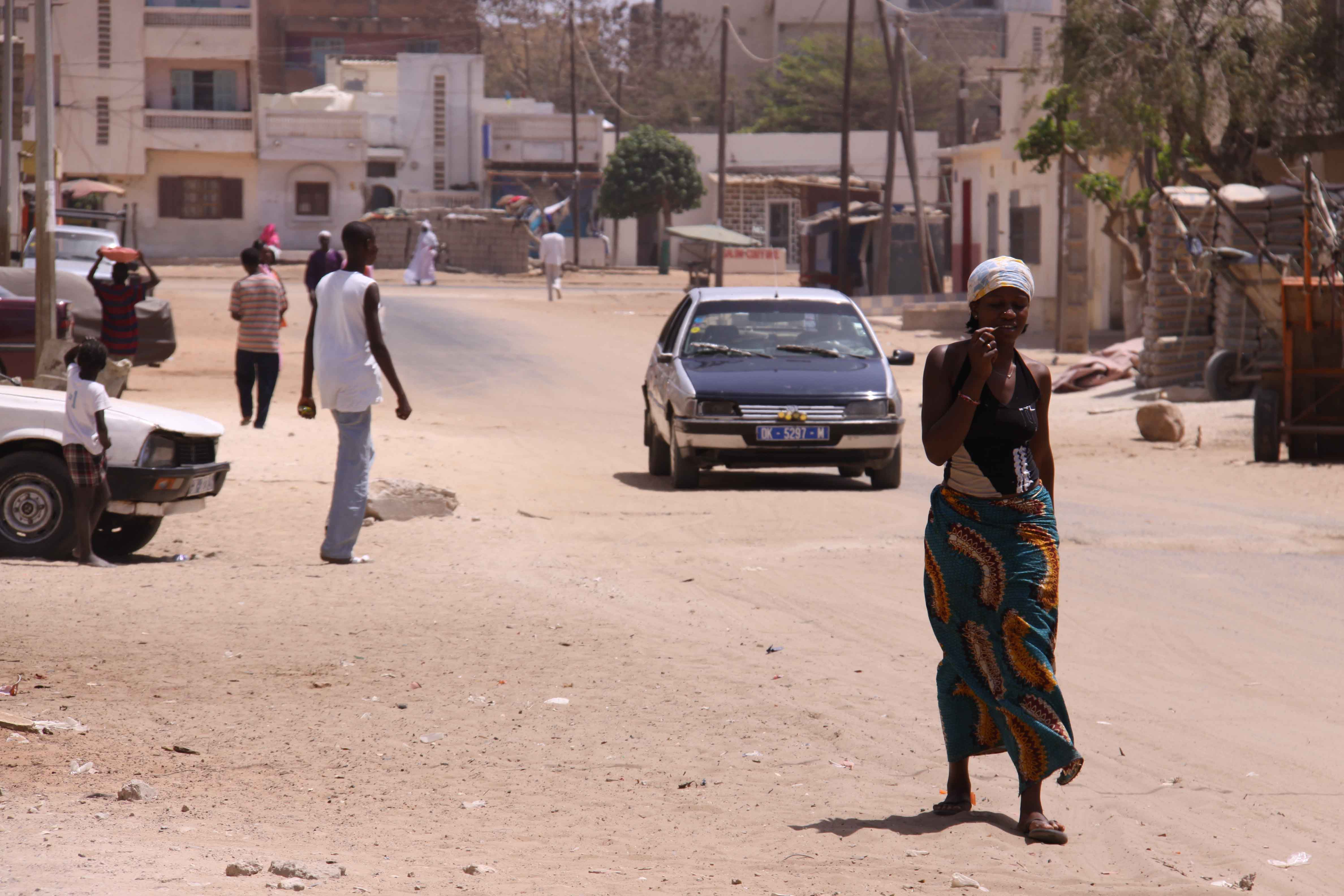

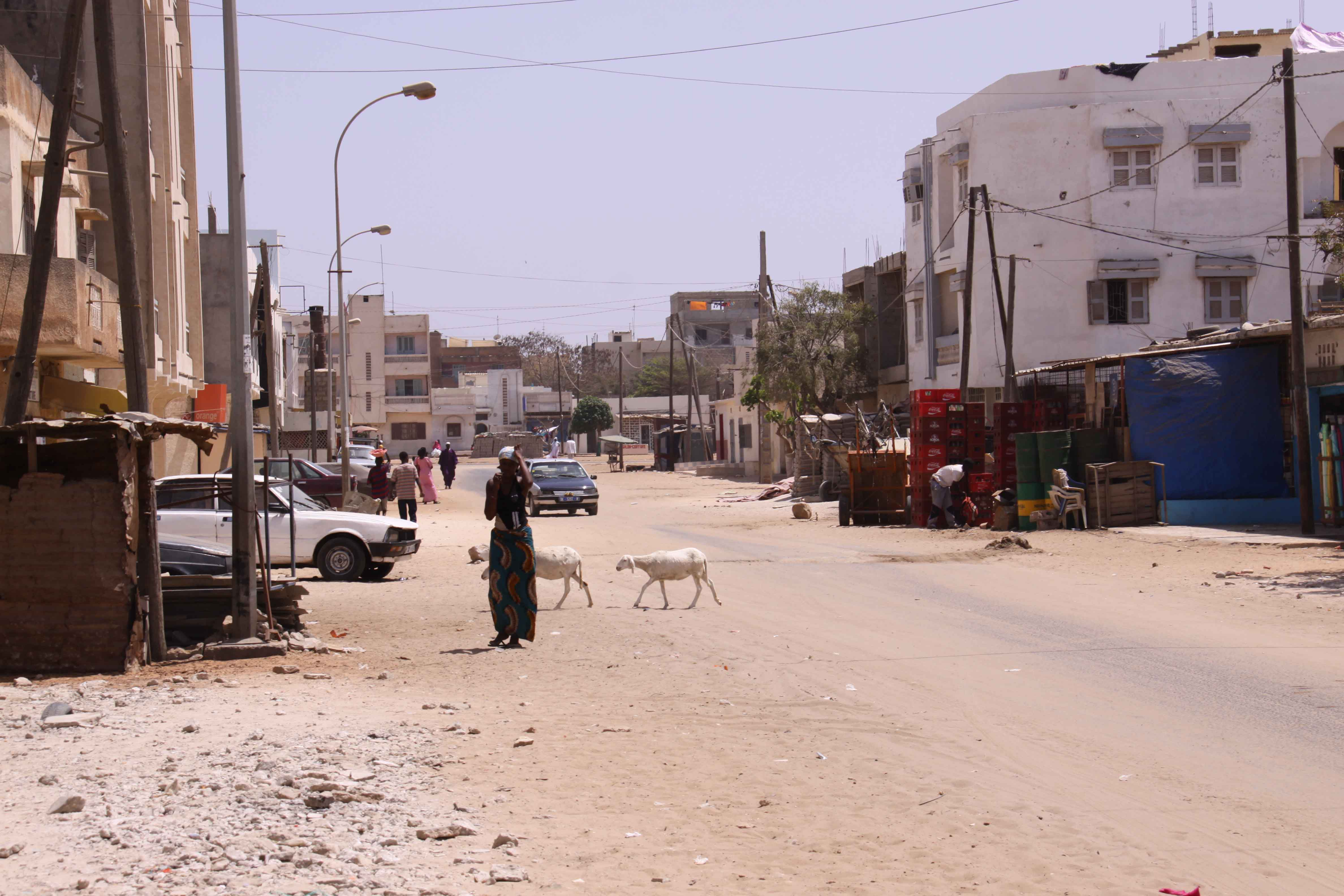

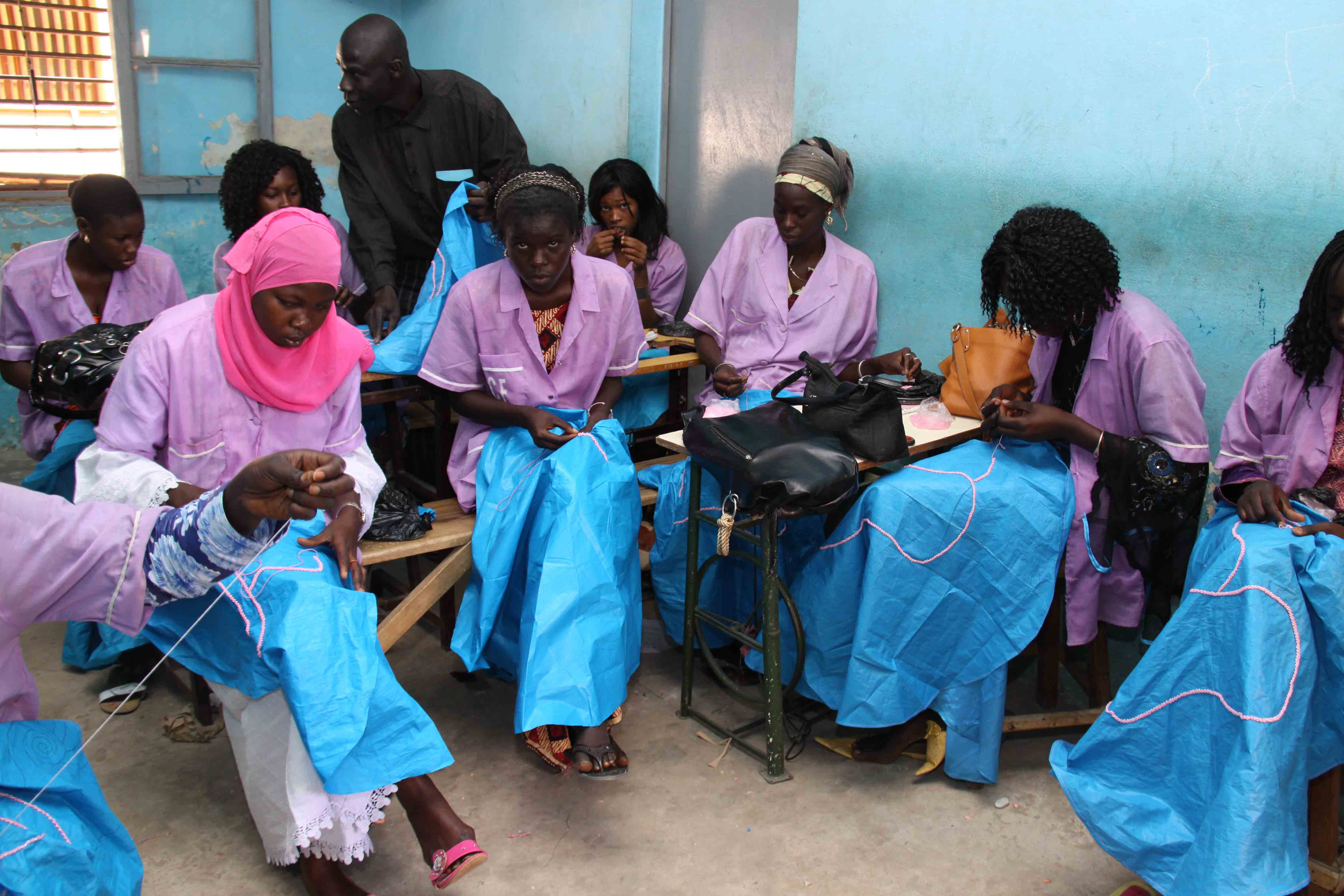
Women at a sewing school

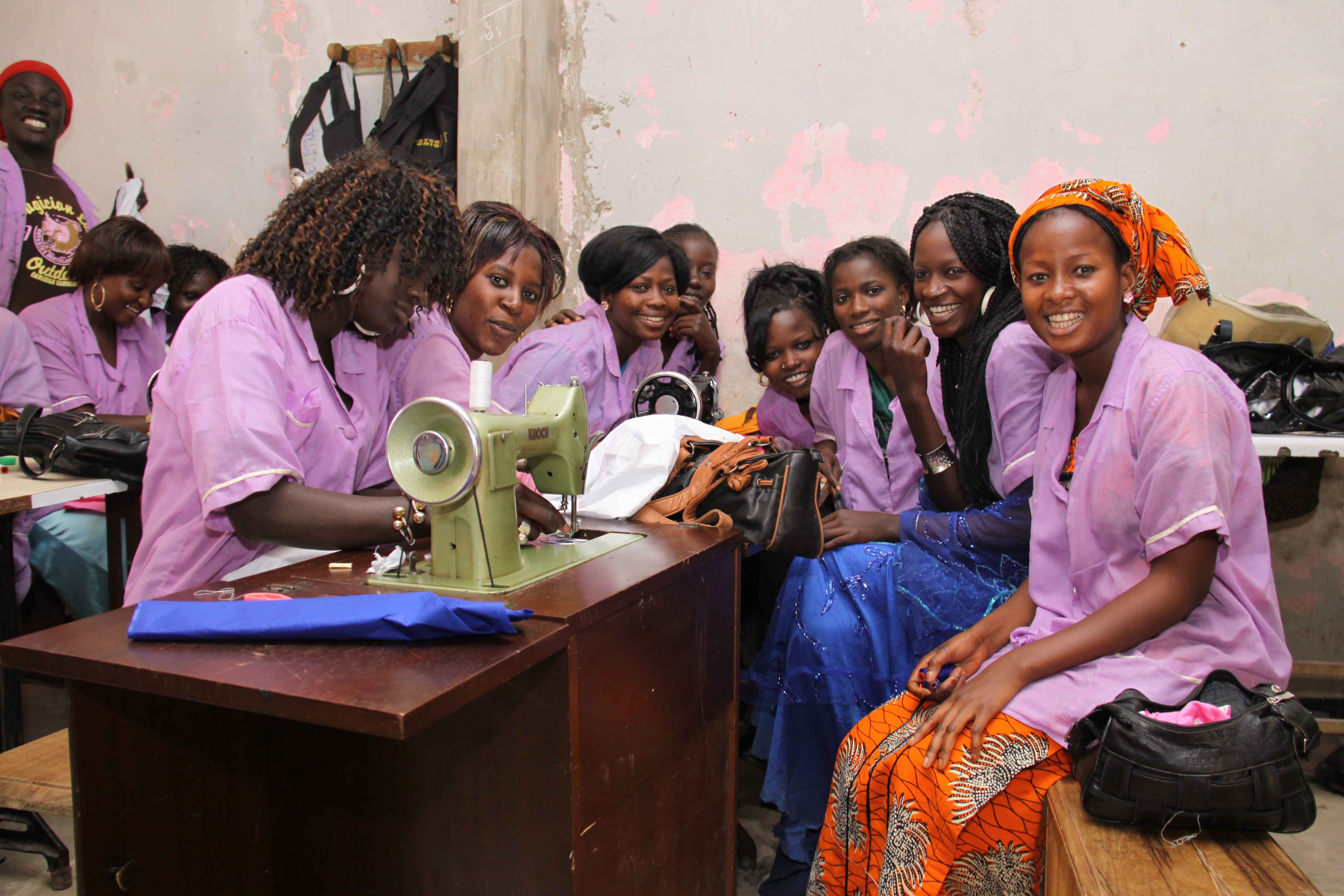

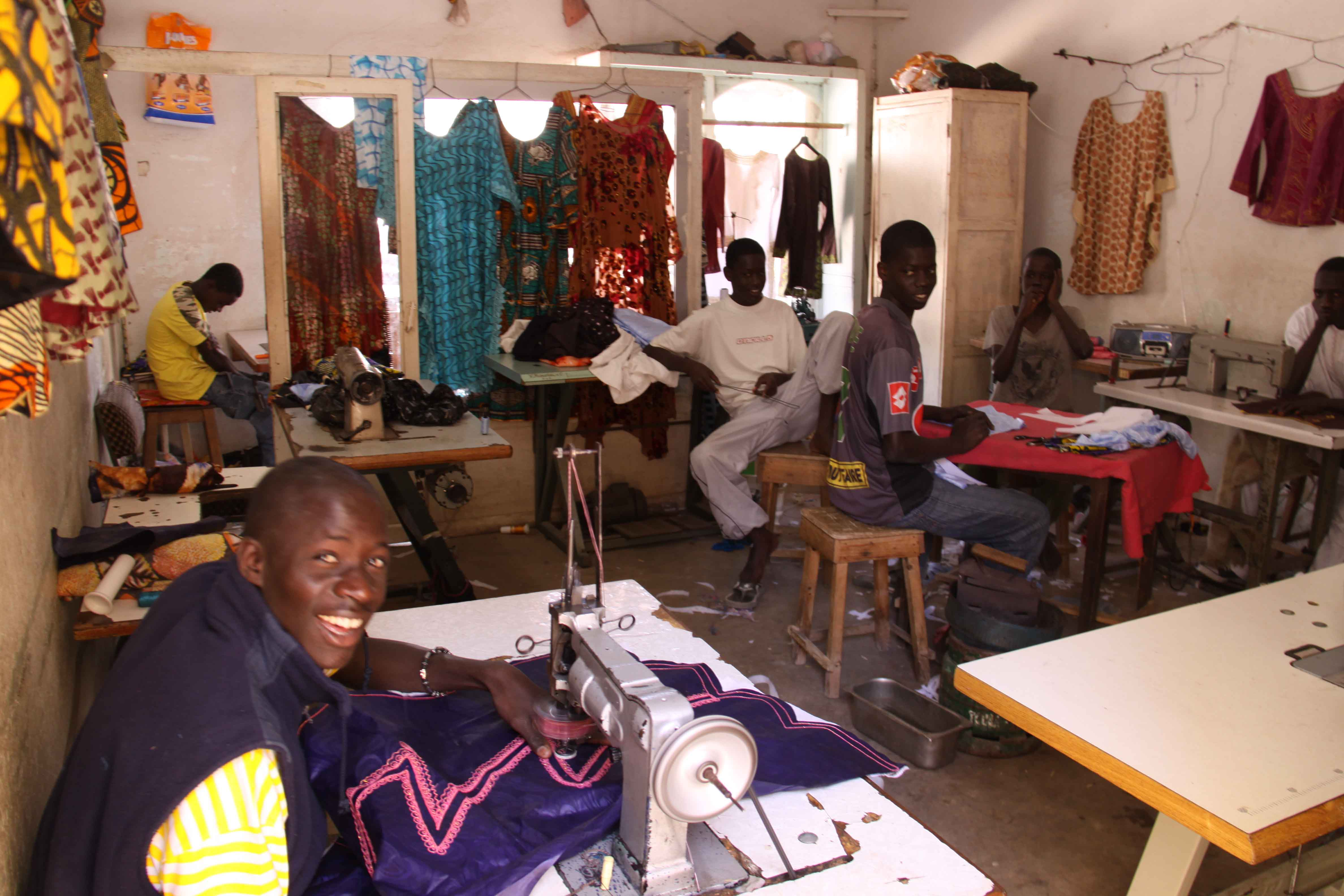
