= US Ouakam =

Senegalese football club

- Full name: Union Sportive Ouakam
- Founded: 1951
- Ground: Stade de Ngor; Dakar, Senegal
- Capacity: chairman = (Senegal) Abdoul Aziz Gueye (in 2011)
- Manager: (Senegal) Omar Gueye Ndiaye (in 2013)
- League: Senegal Premier League
- 2025–26: 6th
Home colours	Away colours

Union Sportive Ouakam (estimate Wolof form: Wakaam), abbreviation: USO is a Senegalese football club based in Dakar in the subdivision of Ouakam in the west of the city close to Cap Vert.

They play in the top division in Senegalese football. Their home stadium is Stade de Ngor.

== History ==
The club was founded in the 1951 by el Hadji Moussa Diagne in the last decade of French rule in Senegal.

After independence, Ouakam was becoming one of the top clubs in Senegal in the 1960s. Ouakam was suspended in the 1962–63 season and played in the second-tier competition for some time which was the lowest level in Senegal before returning to top flight competition again. The last time Ouakam played in second tier competitions was in 2003.

Ouakam win their first cup title in 1964, their second in 1989 and their recent in 2006. Ouakam won their only championship title in 2011.

In the 2017 season, Ouakam started 6th for the 2016-17 season, they climbed to 7th at the 7th round and dropped to 13th at the 12th round and remained for four weeks, slowly, their positions risen to 12th at the 16th round, 11th at the 18th round, 10th a round later and would finish 8th place with 32 points, the club had 7 wins which was the same as Stade Mbour, Ouakam had 11 draws, more than that club. Together with Stade Mbour, they scored 22 goals which was the 12th least ahead of US Gorée and conceded 24 goals which was the third least, that was also the same as Niarry Tally.

Ouakam appeared at the continentals after winning their second cup title in 1990 at the Winners' Cup and advanced up to the quarterfinals where they lost to Nigeria's BCC Lions. They came back for the second and last time in 2007 and lost to Burkina Faso's Étoile Filante. After winning their only championship title, they made their only appearance at the 2012 CAF Champions League and challenged Brikama United and lost the Senegambian match in the preliminaries.

Away uniform up to 2014

== Logo ==
Its logo color has a crested shield with a wave below the middle of the shield, on top is coloured red and white on the bottom. On top has a shark and on the bottom right the club's name in its acronym and year of its foundation.

Its other logo has a white circle with a thin red rim with a shark on top and the club name's acronym on the bottom.

== Honours ==
- Senegal Premier League: 1

2011.

- Senegal FA Cup: 3

1964, 1989, 2006.

== League and cup history ==
=== Performance in CAF competitions ===
US Ouakam's results in CAF competition
Season	Competition	Qualification method	Round	Opposition	Home	Away	Aggregate
1986	CAF Cup Winners' Cup	Senegalese Cup winners	First Round	(Cameroon) Tonnerre Yaoundé	2–0	0–1	3–0
1986	CAF Cup Winners' Cup	Senegalese Cup winners	Second Round	Requins de l'Atlantique	1–0	0–0	2–3
1986	CAF Cup Winners' Cup	Senegalese Cup winners	Quarterfinals	(Nigeria) BCC Lions	0–1	3–1	1–4
2007	CAF Confederation Cup	Senegalese Cup winners	First Round	(Burkina Faso) Étoile Filante Ouagadougou	1–0	1–0	1–1 (3–4 p)
2012	CAF Champions League	Senegalese champions	First Round	(The Gambia) Brikama United	1–0	1–0	1–1 (3–5 p)

=== National level ===
Season	Tier	Pos.	Pl.	W	D	L	GS	GA	GD	P	Cup	League Cup	AN Cup	Notes	Final Phase
1990-91	1	14	30	7	10	13	19	31	-12	24					
1991-92	1	14	30	5	14	1	19	29	-10	34					
2002–03	2		-	-	-	-	-	-	-	-					
2003–04	1	14	38	11	15	12	27	27	7	48					
2005	1	12	34	10	11	13	30	37	-7	41	Winner				
2006	1B	8	16	4	4	8	10	16	-6	16				Did not advance	Did not participate
2007	1A	5	16	7	4	4	14	13	+1	25				Advanced into the Second phase	
2007	1A	6	10	1	4	5	5	12	-7	7					6th place
2008	1A	6	18	4	11	3	13	12	+1	23				Did not advance	Did not participated
2009	1A	5	16	6	3	7	11	10	+1	21		First round		Did not advance	Did not participate
2010	1B	3	16	6	6	4	12	12	0	24		First round		Did not advance	Did not participate
2010–11	1	1	30	16	7	7	27	14	+13	55					
2011–12	1A	2	14	6	7	1	18	8	+10	25				Advanced into the second phase	
2011–12	1A	4	6	1	1	4	1	5	-4	4					2nd place
2013	1	11	30	9	9	12	26	36	-10	36					
2013–14	1	6	26	9	8	9	17	18	-1	35					
2014–15	1	8	26	8	9	9	24	41	+3	33					
2015-16	1	9	26	6	15	5	21	20	+1	33					
2016-17	1	8	26	7	11	8	22	24	-2	32				Demoted due to the Demba Diop stadium crush	
