= ASC Jaraaf =

Association football club in Senegal

- Full name: Association Sportive et Culturelle Jaraaf
- Founded: 20 September 1969; 56 years ago
- Ground: Stade de Ngor
- Capacity: 3,000
- Chairman: Cheikh Seck
- Manager: Malick Daf
- League: Senegal Premier League
- 2025–26: 7th
- Website: https://jaraaf.sn/en/home-en/
Home colours	Away colours	Third colours

Association Sportive et Culturelle Jaraaf is a Senegalese professional football club based in Dakar. They play in the top division in Senegalese football. Their home stadium is Stade de Diaraf.

ASC Jaraaf is the most popular club in Senegal. The club also has the most competitive honours won in Senegal, totaling to 28.

== Name ==
The word Diaraf (French spelling in Senegal) or Jaraaf (Serer and English spelling in the Gambia) comes from the Serer language (Jaraaf, also spelt Jaraff). The Jaraffs were the head of the Serer noble council of electors responsible for electing the Serer kings in pre-colonial times.

== Logo and uniform ==
Its team logo are blue and white.

Its home uniform color features a white t-shirt with a striped green rims on top and green shorts with thick white rims on each side and green socks with two white stripes on top, its awa uniform features the colors opposite with a green t-shirt, white shorts and socks with rims the opposite color to home, its third color uniform has a white t-shirt with a thick black right sash and thin black rims on top and on the top right the Adidas logo, the shirt supplier of the club, it also has black shorts with thick green rims on each side and dark grey socks with black stripes on top.

Until May 2017, its home uniform color were white with green stripes and green shorts and green t-shirt with white stripes and white shorts for away games.

== History ==
The club was founded on 9 May 1933 in the then-colonial capital Dakar. Till 1968 or 1969 the club was called Foyer France Sénégal. Their first title was a cup title won in 1967 and won two straight. Their first championship title was won in 1968 and later they had their first appearance in the African Cup of Champions Clubs in 1968 and lost to FAR Rabat.

On 20 September 1969, Foyer France Sénégal merged with Espoirs de Dakar to form ASC Jaraaf. The club won three consecutive titles between 1975 and 1977, in cup titles, Diaraf won two (1982 and 1983) and then three consecutive (1993–1995) in the club. Diaraf became the second and most recent to win their tenth title in the long 2003–2004 season with a record-breaking 72 points, the club won their eleventh and recent title in 2010. Since 1976, Diaraf has the most national championships won, first with six titles which was shared with ASC Jeanne d'Arc in 1986, later with seven the following season, eight in 1995, nine in 2000 which was shared by the same club in 2002 and was ranked second as Jeanne d'Arc had the totals until it was shared in 2004, now Diaraf has the most with eleven titles, one ahead of ASC Jeanne d'Arc. In cup titles, the club won two consecutive between 1982 and 1983, three consecutive between 1993 and 1995 and again two consecutive between 2008 and 2009. Their recent title win is the Senegal FA Cup in 2013 and their total is fifteen, the most number in Senegal. The other cup win, the Assemblée Nationale totals three.

In recent years, the club finished 4th in 2013 with 46 points, also they scored 36 goals which they hadn't scored above 30 goals in nine years, Runner-up Diaraf finished in Ligue 1 for the 2013–14 season and had 49 points, their highest to date. In the 2014–15 season, Diaraf almost had a fair season and finished 11th, which was their lowest position for some time and had 29 points, also they conceded 31 goals, their worst in about 2-3 decades. In 2016, Diaraf was in the lower positions for the first few rounds until they were 5th at the 9th round, in weeks 15, 17 and 18, they were 13th, in the relegation zone but escaped it and went the 7th by the 19th round, their positions rose slowly, 5th in the 20th round, moderate in the next four round and did not peak above 5th until the last two rounds where they were 3rd at the 25th round and Djaraf finished as runner up with 11 wins, 6 draws and 9 losses and had 39 points. In the 2016–17 season, Djaraf looked for a stint to win another championship title, they started first, dropped to 2nd in the following round before returning to 1st place for the next three rounds, their positions were around moderate, they went the 6th at the 9th round but returned to second place in the 14th and 19th rounds, their stint for another championship title was lost at the 20th round and Djaraf finished fourth place, they shared the same wins, draws, losses and points as they did in the previous season, but the only difference was the club scored 37 goals, not that many scored in 13 years and conceded 27 goals, one more than last season.

Their first cup final appearance then under Foyer France was in 1967 and challenged US Gorée and defeated that club twice in two years, first 2–1 then 4–0. Their third was in 1970 and the first under the name Diaraf and defeated Almadies 3–1, Diaraf was runner up in the 1971 cup after losing 3–0 to ASC Linguère. Diaraf came for their fifth appearance in the cup final and defeated ASC Jeanne d'Arc 2–0 in 1973. Two years later, Diaraf defeated AS Police 2–0, a year later the club lost 3–1 The 1979 cup final was Diaraf's eighth appearance and lost to Casa Sports of Ziguinchor in the southwest of the nation. Two years later, Diaraf list the final to AS Police 3–1. In the next two cup finals, Diaraf defeated Police 2–1 in the 1982 and 1–0 in 1983. The 1985 cup final was Djaraf's eleventh appearance and defeated ASEC Ndiambour 1–0. Diaraf returned to the cup final six years later and defeated Jeanne d'Arc 2–1. Two years later in the 1993 cup final, the second featuring Linguère and this time defeated it 3–0, in the following year, the club defeated CSS Richard-Toll 1–0 and a year later AS Douanes 2–0 in the 1995 cup final. Diaraf made their sixteenth cup final appearance in 2004 and lost to Douanes 2–1. Djaraf made two consecutive cup final appearances in 2008 and 2009 and the two ended it in victory, their first was against Stade Mbour and defeated that club and then defeated AS Camberène a year later. Diaraf's nineteenth and the most recent cup appearance was in 2013 where they won their recent cup title, this was their second against Casa Sports and this time defeated that club in penalty kicks 2–1 after the final was tied with a goal apiece.

Djaraf's first League Cup appearance was in 2009, when they lost in the first round to Djokoul. Diaraf's success was greatest in the 2010 edition, the club appeared in the 1/4 final and defeated RS Yoff, 3–0, then in the quarterfinals, they defeated CSS Richard-Toll and ASC Port Autonome in the semis. Diaraf challenged Casa Sports in the final and lost the title to that club, 1–2. Diaraf has appeared in every League Cup editions.

=== African competitions ===
Diaraf has appeared in the continental championship 13 times, the most of any club from Senegal. Diaraf has scored a total of 64 goals. at the Champions League, also the club has played 54 matches, and had 25 wins (19 won at home, 5 won away) and 13 draws (7 at home, 6 away).

== Honours ==
National:

- Senegal Premier League: 13

1968, 1970, 1975, 1976, 1977, 1982, 1989, 1995, 2000, 2004, 2010, 2018, 2024–25

- Senegal FA Cup: 16

1967, 1968, 1970, 1973, 1975, 1982, 1983, 1985, 1991, 1993, 1994, 1995, 2008, 2009, 2013, 2023

- Senegal Assemblée Nationale Cup: 5

1987, 1991, 2003, 2006, 2018

Colonial era:

- French West African Cup: 1

1948

== League and cup history ==
=== National level ===
Season	Tier	Pos.	Pl.	W	D	L	GS	GA	GD	P	Cup	League Cup	AN Cup	Notes	Final Phase
1981	1	9	26	8	8	10	34	32	+2	24	Finalist				
1982	1	1	26	-	-	-	-	-	-	-	Winner				
1984	1	5	26	-	-	-	-	-	-	28					
1990-91	1	4	30	12	12	6	36	20	+16	36	Winner		Winner		
1991-92	1	5	30	11	13	6	31	17	+14	35	Finalist				
1992-93	1	2	28	-	-	-	-	-	-	52	Winner				
1995	1A	1	16	8	5	3	23	12	+11	29	Winner			Advanced into playoffs	Champion
1997	1	8	26	-	-	-	-	-	-	31					
1998	1	2	26	-	-	-	-	-	-	46					
1999	1	6	26	7	14	5	22	18	+4	35					
2000	1	1	22	9	10	3	20	9	+11	37					
2000–2001	1	4	26	10	11	5	22	12	+10	41					
2001–2002	1	6	26	8	9	8	16	20	-4	33					
2002–2003	1	2	26	12	11	3	28	11	+17	47			Winner		
2003–2004	1	1	38	20	12	6	54	22	+32	72	Finalist				
2005	1	2	34	13	15	6	26	12	+14	54					
2006	1A	2	16	5	9	2	13	10	+3	24				Advanced into the Second phase	
2006	1A	2	6	1	4	1	8	8	0	7				2nd place	
2007	1B	5	16	5	3	8	10	18	-8	18				Did not advance	Did not participated
2008	1B	4	18	7	8	3	16	11	+5	29	Winner			Did not advance	Did not participated
2009	1A	2	16	6	6	4	15	10	+5	24	Winner	First Round		Advanced to the finals	second place
2010	1B	1	16	8	7	1	22	3	+19	31		Finalist		Advanced to the finals	Champion
2010–2011	1	2	30	11	14	5	31	23	+8	47					
2011–2012	1B	3	14	7	4	3	17	8	+9	25				Did not advance	Did not participate
2013	1	4	30	11	13	6	29	20	+9	46	Winner				
2013–2014	1	2	26	13	9	4	36	22	+14	49					
2014–2015	1	11	26	7	8	11	27	31	-4	29	Semifinals				
2015-16	1	2	26	11	6	9	31	26	+5	39					
2016-17	1	4	26	11	6	9	37	27	+10	39					

== Statistics ==
- Best position: Semi-finals (continental)
- Best position at a cup competition: Second Round (continental)
- Best position at the League Cup: Finalist
- Appearances at the League Cup: 9
- Highest number of wins in a season: 20 (national)
- Highest number of goals in a season: 54—national record
- Highest number of points in a season: 72—national record
- Total goals scored at a cup final: 27
- Total matches played at the CAF Champions League: 54
  - Total matches played at home: 27
  - Total matches played away: 27
- Total number of wins at the CAF Champions League: 25
  - Total home wins: 19
  - Total away wins: 5
- Total draws at the CAF Champions League: 13
  - Total home draws: 7
  - Total away draws: 6
- Total number of goals scored at the CAF Champions League: 64

Esau Buhaga (CF) 26 years

== See also ==
- FC Djaraf - an amateur football club based in Canchungo in the northwestern part of Guinea-Bissau, it is also named after the former rulers
