= Ligue 1 (Senegal) =

- Founded: 1960
- Country: Senegal
- Confederation: CAF
- Number of clubs: 16
- Level on pyramid: 1
- Relegation to: Ligue 2
- Domestic cup(s): Senegal FA Cup; Coupe de la Ligue
- International cup(s): Champions League; Confederation Cup
- Current champions: Teungueth (3rd title) (2025–26)
- Most championships: ASC Jaraaf (13)
- Current: 2025–26

Ligue 1 is the top division of the Senegal Football Association, it was founded in 1960. The league also hosts a domestic cup, the Coupe de la Ligue. Football clubs from the Senegal Premier League also compete for the Senegal FA Cup. In the 2023–24 Ligue 1 season, a total of 182,915 paying visitors attended the clubs.

== Previous winners ==
- 1960 : ASC Jeanne d'Arc (Dakar)
- 1961–63 : unknown champion
- 1964 : Olympique Thiès
- 1965 : unknown champion
- 1966 : Olympique Thiès
- 1967 : Espoir de Saint-Louis
- 1968 : Foyer France (Dakar)
- 1969 : ASC Jeanne d'Arc (Dakar)
- 1970 : ASC Diaraf (Dakar)
- 1971 : ASFA Dakar
- 1972 : ASFA Dakar
- 1973 : ASC Jeanne d'Arc (Dakar)
- 1974 : ASFA Dakar
- 1975 : ASC Diaraf (Dakar)
- 1976 : ASC Diaraf (Dakar)
- 1977 : ASC Diaraf (Dakar)
- 1978 : US Gorée (Dakar)
- 1979 : AS Police (Dakar)
- 1980 : SEIB (Diourbel)
- 1981 : US Gorée (Dakar)
- 1982 : ASC Diaraf (Dakar)
- 1983 : SEIB (Diourbel)
- 1984 : US Gorée (Dakar)
- 1985 : ASC Jeanne d'Arc (Dakar)
- 1986 : ASC Jeanne d'Arc (Dakar)
- 1987 : SEIB (Diourbel)
- 1988 : ASC Jeanne d'Arc (Dakar)
- 1988–89 : ASC Diaraf (Dakar)
- 1990 : UCST Port Autonome (Dakar)
- 1990–91 : UCST Port Autonome (Dakar)
- 1991–92 : ASEC Ndiambour (Louga)
- 1992–93 : AS Douanes (Dakar)
- 1993–94 : ASEC Ndiambour (Louga)
- 1995 : ASC Diaraf (Dakar)
- 1996 : SONACOS (Diourbel)
- 1997 : AS Douanes (Dakar)
- 1998 : ASEC Ndiambour (Louga)
- 1999 : ASC Jeanne d'Arc (Dakar)
- 2000 : ASC Diaraf (Dakar)
- 2000–01 : ASC Jeanne d'Arc (Dakar)
- 2001–02 : ASC Jeanne d'Arc (Dakar)
- 2002–03 : ASC Jeanne d'Arc (Dakar)
- 2003–04 : ASC Diaraf (Dakar)
- 2005 : UCST Port Autonome (Dakar)
- 2006 : AS Douanes (Dakar)
- 2006–07 : AS Douanes (Dakar)
- 2008 : AS Douanes (Dakar)
- 2009 : ASC Linguère (Saint-Louis)
- 2010 : ASC Diaraf (Dakar)
- 2010–11 : US Ouakam (Dakar)
- 2011–12 : Casa Sports (Ziguinchor)
- 2013 : Diambars FC (Saly)
- 2013–14 : AS Pikine (Pikine)
- 2014–15 : AS Douanes (Dakar)
- 2015–16 : US Gorée (Dakar)
- 2016–17 : Génération Foot (Rufisque)
- 2017–18 : ASC Diaraf (Dakar)
- 2018–19 : Génération Foot (Rufisque)
- 2019–20 : Abandoned
- 2020–21 : Teungueth FC (Rufisque)
- 2021–22 : Casa Sports (Ziguinchor)
- 2022–23 : Génération Foot (Rufisque)
- 2023–24 : Teungueth FC (Rufisque)
- 2024–25 : ASC Jaraaf (Dakar)
- 2025–26 : Teungueth FC (Rufisque)

== Total number of wins ==
Club	Titles
ASC Jaraaf (Dakar) [includes Foyer France]	13
ASC Jeanne d'Arc	10
AS Douanes	6
ASC SUNEOR (Diourbel) [includes SEIB & SONACOS]	4
US Gorée	4
ASFA Dakar	3
ASEC Ndiambour	3
UCST Port Autonome	3
Teungueth	3
Olympique Thiès	2
Génération Foot	2
Casa-Sports FC	2
AS Police	1
Espoir de Saint-Louis	1
ASC Linguère	1
US Ouakam	1
Diambars FC	1
AS Pikine	1

== Qualification for CAF competitions ==
=== Association ranking for the 2025–26 CAF club season ===
The association ranking for the 2025–26 CAF Champions League and the 2025–26 CAF Confederation Cup will be based on results from each CAF club competition from 2020–21 to the 2024–25 season.

Legend

- CL: CAF Champions League
- CC: CAF Confederation Cup
- ≥: Associations points might increase on basis of its clubs performance in 2024–25 CAF club competitions
- Associations ranked 1–12 are eligible to enter two teams in each CAF club competition.

Rank			Association	2020–21 (× 1)		2021–22 (× 2)		2022–23 (× 3)		2023–24 (× 4)		2024–25 (× 5)		Total
2025	2024	Mvt	Association	CL	CC	CL	CC	CL	CC	CL	CC	CL	CC	Total
1	1	—	Egypt	8	3	7	4	8	2.5	7	7	10	4	190.5
2	2	—	Morocco	4	6	9	5	8	2	2	4	5	5	142
3	4	+1	South Africa	8	2	5	4	4	3	4	1.5	9	3	131
4	3	-1	Algeria	6	5	7	1	6	5	2	3	5	5	130
5	6	+1	Tanzania	3	0.5	0	2	3	4	6	0	2	4	82.5
6	5	-1	Tunisia	4	3	5	1	4	2	6	1	3	0.5	82.5
7	8	+1	Angola	1	0	5	0	2	0	3	1.5	2	2	55
8	7	-1	DR Congo	4	0	0	3	1	2	4	0	2	0	45
9	9	—	Sudan	3	0	3	0	3	0	2	0	3	0	41
10	11	+1	Ivory Coast	0	0	0	1	0	3	3	0	1	2	38
11	10	-1	Libya	0	0.5	0	5	0	0.5	0	3	0	0	24
12	12	—	Nigeria	0	2	0	0	0	2	0	2	0	1	21
13	15	+2	Mali	0	0	0	0	0	1	0	2	1	0.5	18.5
14	14	—	Ghana	0	0	0	0	0	0	1	3	0	0	16
15	13	-2	Guinea	2	0	1	0	2	0	0	0.5	0	0	12
16	19	+3	Botswana	0	0	1	0	0	0	1	0	0	0.5	8.5
17	21	+4	Senegal	1	2	0	0	0	0	0	0	0	1	8
18	17	-1	Mauritania	0	0	0	0	0	0	2	0	0	0	8
19	18	-1	Congo	0	0	0	1	0	1	0	0.5	0	0	7
20	16	-4	Cameroon	0	3	0	0.5	1	0	0	0	0	0	7
21	22	+1	Togo	0	0	0	0	0	1	0	0	0	0	3
22	22	—	Uganda	0	0	0	0	1	0	0	0	0	0	3
23	-	new	Mozambique	0	0	0	0	0	0	0	0	0	0.5	2.5
24	20	-4	Zambia	0	1.5	0	0.5	0	0	0	0	0	0	2.5
25	24	-1	Eswatini	0	0	0	0.5	0	0	0	0	0	0	1
25	24	-1	Niger	0	0	0	0.5	0	0	0	0	0	0	1
27	26	-1	Burkina Faso	0	0.5	0	0	0	0	0	0	0	0	0.5

== Top goalscorers ==
Season	Player	Club	Goals
1991–92	Kamine Sarr	ASC Diaraf	13
1991–92	(Senegal) Moussa Diop	SOTRAC	13
2000	(Senegal) Makhète N'Diaye	Richard-Toll	
2000–01	(Senegal) Cheikh Tidiane N'Diaye	US Gorée	11
2002–03	(Senegal) Lamine Diarra	Dakar UC	9
2003–04	(Senegal) Pape Cire Dia	ASC Diaraf	16
2005	Babacar Thiam	US Rail	
2005	(Senegal) Mbaye Babacar Bâ	ASC Saloum	
2013–14	(Senegal) Ibrahima Diop	ASC Diaraf	16
2015–16	(Senegal) Pape Ibnou Ba	ASC Linguère	17
2016–17	(Senegal) Ibrahima Niane	Génération Foot	19
2017–18	(Senegal) Amadou Dia N'Diaye	Génération Foot	16
2018–19	(The Gambia) Omar Jobe	ASEC Ndiambour	12
2022–23	(The Gambia) Abdoulie Hassama	Casa Sports	12
2023–24	(Senegal) Mbaye Jacques Ndiaye	Teungueth	8

=== Multiple hat-tricks ===
Rank	Country	Player	Hat-tricks
1	(Senegal)	Cheick N'Diaye	1

== Top assists ==
Season	Player	Team	Assists
2022–23	(Senegal) Souleymane Cissé	Linguerè Saint Louis	7

== See also ==
- Football in Senegal
