= Guédiawaye FC =

Senegalese football club

- Full name: Guédiawaye Football Club
- Founded: 1993; 33 years ago
- Ground: Stade Amadou Barry, Guédiawaye, Senegal
- Capacity: 5,000
- Chairman: Djibril Diakhaté
- Manager: Abdoulaye Mbow
- League: Senegal Premier League
- 2025–26: 13th

Guédiawaye FC is a Senegalese football club based in Dakar. They are a member of the Senegal Premier League They play their home games at Stade Amadou Barry.

== Achievements ==
- League Cup
  - Winners (1): 2014

== Squad ==
Note: Flags indicate national team as defined under FIFA eligibility rules; some limited exceptions apply. Players may hold more than one non-FIFA nationality.

No. / Pos. / Nation / Player; — / MF / SEN / Ibrahima Birame Coundoul	No. / Pos. / Nation / Player; — / MF / SEN / Abdoulaye Dieng
