= Stade de Mbour =

Senegalese football club

- Full name: Stade de Mbour
- Founded: 1960
- Ground: Stade Municipal de Mbour; Mbour, Senegal
- Capacity: 5,000
- Chairman: Alioune Moussa Faye
- Manager: Demba N'Diaye
- League: Senegal Premier League
- 2025–26: 11th
- Website: https://www.stadedembour.com/
Home colours	Away colours

Stade de Mbour is a Senegalese football club based in Mbour. They currently play in the Senegal Premier League.

They played the 2010 season in the top division in Senegalese football and were part of the Senegal Ligue 2. Their home stadium is Stade Municipal de Mbour.

== Achievements ==
- Coupe de la Ligue: 1
  - 2017
- Senegal Assemblée Nationale Cup: 2
  - 2009, 2010
