= ASC Jeanne d'Arc in African football =

- Club: ASC Diaraf
- First entry: 1970 African Cup of Champions Clubs
- Latest entry: 2004 CAF Champions League

Titles
- Champions League: 0 (Best: Finals)
- Confederation Cup: 0 (Best: Second Round of 16)
- Cup Winners' Cup: 0 (Best: Semi-Finals)
- CAF Cup: 0 (Best: Finals)

ASC Jeanne d'Arc a Senegalese professional association football club, has gained entry to Confederation of African Football (CAF) competitions on several occasions. They have represented Senegal in the Champions League on nine occasions, the now-defunct Cup Winners' Cup on four separate occasions, and the now-defunct CAF Cup on two occasions. Their overall representation is second behind Diaraf but is the Senegalese club who had the highest achievement being a finalist which was the 1998 CAF Cup. Both Jeanne d'Arc and Diaraf are Semifinalists at the CAF Champions League.

ASC Jeanne d'Arc has appeared 16 times in continental competitions, second to Diaraf. ASC Jeanne d'Arc has challenged the most number of clubs (some one of them three times) of any Senegalese clubs.

== History ==
Jeanne d'Arc's first continental appearance was in 1970 at the championships when it was called the African Cup of Champions Clubs. The club defeated Algeria's CR Belcourt (now CR Belouizdad), their home match was a walkover as Belcourt withdrew, Jeanne d'Arc headed to the Second Round to face AS Kaloum Star from Guinea and lost to that club. Their second appearance wa sin 1974 and the club faced Sierra Leone's Ports Authority FC and defeated that club with a total of 6 goals to 3, then in the Second Round, Hafia FC withdrew so Jeanne d'Ark headed to the quarterfinals and faced ASEC Mimosas, after defeating that club, they challenged against CARA Brazzaville in the semis, the club lost with a total of 3 goals to 4. Their next two appearances at the Cup of Champions Clubs was no greater than the First Round, the club lost to three North African Clubs, two of them Moroccan, first to MAS Fez without a goal scored in 1986, then to Algeria's EP Sétif in 1987 and to Raja Casablanca on 1989. Jeanne d'Arc's sixth appearance would be called the CAF Champions League and was the first Senegalese club to reach the Group Stage, they would head there three times with the exception of the 2003 season, first the club defeated two North African Clubs in 2001, first to MC Alger then Raja Casablanca from Morocco, Jeanne d'Arc reached group stage and challenged Lobi Stars, Hearts of Oak and al-Ahly, it was no success, the club scored 6 goals to 12 in six of its matches. Jeanne d'Arc's seventh appearance was the 2002 CAF Champions League, they defeated CR Belouizdad, their second meeting, their last meeting was when the club was known as CR Belcourt, then, they defeated Stade Malien, the mightiest of the Amateurs today and one of the greatest of Mali, the club entered the group stage and challenged al-Ahly, the only Senegalese club that challenged for the second time, TP Mazembe of the Democratic Congo and Raja Casablanca, Jeanne d'Arc and was later out with 3 wins (9 points) and scored 8 goals, a year later, they came to the 2003 edition and defeated ASFA Yennenga, they did not gained entry into Group Stage after losing to Enyimba FC. Jeanne d'Arc's tenth and recent appearance was in 2004, the club defeated the Gambian Armed Forces, Raja Casablanca and Canon Yaoundé and entered the group stage for the last time, it contained USM Alger, Espérance ST of Tunis and South Africa's Supersport United, the club had 3 wins and two draws totalling 11 points and scored a total of 8 goals and advanced up to semis, the first for the club and the first for any Senegalese club, the club lost to Tunisia's ES Sahel with 2 goals to 4 in two of its matches.

At the continental cup. Their first appearance was the 1975 CAF Cup Winner's Cup after winning the national cup title, the club headed to the semis, first they defeated the Gambia's Wallidan FC, then Tempěte Mocaf, the club lost to Stella Club d'Adjamé as they lost the away match. The club came back six years later in the 1981 edition and the club lost to Sierra Leone's Real Republicans. Jeanne d'Arc's success was greater in the 1985 CAF Cup Winner's Cup as they advanced up to the quarterfinals, the club defeated RS Kenitra, then MP Oran and the club lost to Leventis United, each as the other club scored away, their recent competition was in the 1988 season, the club defeated ASKO Kara of Togo and then lost to Diamant Yaoundé. Jeanne d'Arc's position was as a semifinalist shared with Diaraf, the highest of any club in Senegal. In 1998, ASC Jeanne d'Arc was the finalist in the 1998 CAF Cup, the club lost to CS Sfaxien, the highest position at a cup competition of a Senegalese club, before, they defeated MC Oran, Petrosport FC RS Settat of Morocco and Nchanga Rangers of Zambia.

Their positions were in the mid-range in later seasons but was on the last positions in the 2009 season. In 2011, the club was relegated after being 15th and is currently in Ligue 2 (Senegal)\Ligue 2 competitions as of the 2016-17 season.

== CAF Competitions ==
ASC Jeanne d'Arc's results in CAF competition
Season	Competition	Qualification method	Round	Opposition	Home	Away	Aggregate
1970	African Cup of Champions Clubs	Senegalese champions	First Round	(Algeria) CR Belcourt^{1}	canc.^{2}	3–5	3–5
1970	African Cup of Champions Clubs	Senegalese champions	Second Round	(Guinea) AS Kaloum Star	2–3	3–1	3–6
1974	African Cup of Champions Clubs	Senegalese champions	First Round	(Sierra Leone) Ports Authority FC	3–1	2–3	6–3
1974	African Cup of Champions Clubs	Senegalese champions	Second Round	(Guinea) Hafia FC	canc.	canc.	^{3}
1974	African Cup of Champions Clubs	Senegalese champions	Quarterfinals	(Ivory Coast) ASEC Mimosas	1–0	2–1	2–2 (a)
1974	African Cup of Champions Clubs	Senegalese champions	Semifinals	CARA Brazzaville	1–4	0–2	3–4
1975	CAF Cup Winners' Cup	Senegalese Cup winners	1/8 Final	(The Gambia) Wallidan FC	2-0	0-0	2-0
1975	CAF Cup Winners' Cup	Senegalese Cup winners	Quarterfinals	(Central African Republic) AS Tempête Mocaf	1-1	3-1	4-2
1975	CAF Cup Winners' Cup	Senegalese Cup winners	Semifinals	(Ivory Coast) Stella Club d'Adjamé	2-2	1-2	3-4
1981	CAF Cup Winners' Cup	Senegalese Cup winners	Second Round	(Sierra Leone) Real Republicans	0-1	2-2	2-3
1985	CAF Cup Winners' Cup	Senegalese Cup winners	First Round	(Morocco) RS Kenitra	1-0	0-1	2-0
1985	CAF Cup Winners' Cup	Senegalese Cup winners	Second Round	(Algeria) MP Oran	0-0	1-1	1-1 (a)
1985	CAF Cup Winners' Cup	Senegalese Cup winners	Quarterfinals	(Nigeria) Leventis United	0-1	1-0	0-2
1986	African Cup of Champions Clubs	Senegalese champions	First Round	(Morocco) MAS Fez	0–0	2–0	0–2
1987	African Cup of Champions Clubs	Senegalese champions	First Round	(Algeria) ES Sétif	2–1	2–0	2–3
1988	CAF Cup Winners' Cup	Senegalese Cup winners	First Round	(Togo) ASKO Kara	3-0	1-2	5-1
1988	CAF Cup Winners' Cup	Senegalese Cup winners	Second Round	(Cameroon) Diamant Yaoundé	1-2	1-2	3-3 (a)
1989	African Cup of Champions Clubs	Senegalese champions	First Round	(Morocco) Raja Casablanca	1–0	2–0	1–2
1993	CAF Cup	Senegalese Cup winners	First Round	(Algeria) USM El Harrach	0–0	6–1	1–6
1998	CAF Cup	Senegalese Cup winners	First Round	(Algeria) MC Oran	1–0	2–1	2–2 (a)
1998	CAF Cup	Senegalese Cup winners	Second Round	(Gabon) Petrosport FC	2–0	0–2	4–0
1998	CAF Cup	Senegalese Cup winners	Quarterfinals	(Morocco) RS Settat	2–0	0–0	2–0
1998	CAF Cup	Senegalese Cup winners	Semifinals	(Zambia) Nchanga Rangers	0–0	0–0	0–0 (3-1 p)
1998	CAF Cup	Senegalese Cup winners	Finals	(Tunisia) CS Sfaxien	0–1	3–0	0–4
2000	CAF Champions League	Senegalese champions	First Round	(Algeria) MC Alger	5–1	1–1	6–2
2000	CAF Champions League	Senegalese champions	Second Round	(Morocco) Raja Casablanca	1–0	1–2	3–1
2000	CAF Champions League	Senegalese champions	Group Stage	(Nigeria) Lobi Stars	0–0	1–3	4th place
2000	CAF Champions League	Senegalese champions	Group Stage	(Ghana) Hearts of Oak	2–4	1–1	4th place
2000	CAF Champions League	Senegalese champions	Group Stage	(Egypt) al-Ahly	1–1	1–3	4th place
2002	CAF Champions League	Senegalese champions	First Round	(Algeria) CR Belouizdad	1–0	1–1	2–1
2002	CAF Champions League	Senegalese champions	Second Round	(Mali) Stade Malien	2–1	0–3	4–1
2002	CAF Champions League	Senegalese champions	Group Stage^{4}	(Egypt) al-Ahly	2–1	2–1	3rd place
2002	CAF Champions League	Senegalese champions	Group Stage^{4}	(Democratic Republic of the Congo) TP Mazembe	0–1	1–3	3rd place
2002	CAF Champions League	Senegalese champions	Group Stage^{4}	(Morocco) Raja Casablanca	1–2	1–2	3rd place
2003	CAF Champions League	Senegalese champions	First Round	(Burkina Faso) ASFA Yennenga	2–0	0–1	3–0
2003	CAF Champions League	Senegalese champions	Second Round	(Nigeria) Enyimba FC	0–0	0–4	0–4
2004	CAF Champions League	Senegalese champions	Preliminary Round	(The Gambia) Armed Forces	3–0	0–3	6–0
2004	CAF Champions League	Senegalese champions	First Round	(Morocco) Raja Casablanca	2–0	2–0	2–2 (7-6 p)
2004	CAF Champions League	Senegalese champions	Second Round	(Cameroon) Canon Yaoundé	2–0	1–2	4–1
2004	CAF Champions League	Senegalese champions	Group Stage^{4}	(Algeria) USM Alger	2–1	1–1	2nd place
2004	CAF Champions League	Senegalese champions	Group Stage^{4}	(Tunisia) Espérance ST	2–1	5–0	2nd place
2004	CAF Champions League	Senegalese champions	Group Stage^{4}	(South Africa) Supersport United	2–0	1–1	2nd place
2004	CAF Champions League	Senegalese champions	Semifinals	(Tunisia) ES Sahel	2–1	3–0	2–4

^{1}The club now known as CR Belouizdad
^{2} CR Belcourt withdrew
^{2} Hafia abandoned the tournament

== Non-CAF Competitions ==
=== French West African Cup ===
The French West African Cup was a football (soccer) tournament between clubs of the former French Western African territories, it existed from 1947 to 1960. Jeanne d'Arc won two titles in 1951 and in 1952.

- 1947:
  - Semifinals: Defeated Espérance Rufisque (now Sporting Rufisque)
  - Finals: Lost to US Gorée 2-1
- 1951:
  - Semifinals: Defeated Africa Sports of the Ivory Coast
  - Finals: Defeated Jeanne d'Arc of Bamako (now Stade Malien) 3-1
- 1952:
  - Semifinals: Defeated Africa Sports of the Ivory Coast
  - Finals: Defeated Étoile Sportive Porto Novo 2-1
- 1959:
  - Semifinals: Lost to Modèle Lomé

=== WAFU Club Championship ===
ASC Jeanne d'Arc results at the WAFU Club Championship
Season	Competition	Qualification method	Round	Opposition	Home	Away	Aggregate
1992	WAFU Club Championship	Division 1 Runner-up	Preliminary Round	(Ivory Coast) Stade d'Abidjan			w/o (Note: Stade d'Abidjan withdrew)
1992	WAFU Club Championship	Division 1 Runner-up	First Round	(Liberia) Fulani FC	0–1		0–1

== Statistics ==
=== By competition ===
==== In Africa ====
CAF competitions
Competition	Seasons	Played	Won	Drawn	Lost	Goals For	Goals Against	Last season played
Champions League	9	54	26	10	19	79	68	2004 CAF Champions League
CAF Cup Winners' Cup	4	18	7	6	5	22	16	1988 African Cup Winners' Cup
CAF Cup	2	12	5	4	3	9	12	1998 CAF Cup
Total	15	84	38	20	27	110	96	

== Statistics by country ==
=== CAF Competitions ===
Country	Club	P	W	D	L	GF	GA	GD
Algeria	CR Belouizdad	3	1	1	1	5	6	-1
Algeria	MC Oran	4	1	2	1	3	3	0
Algeria	ES Sétif	2	1	0	1	2	3	-1
Algeria	USM El Harrach	2	0	1	1	1	6	-5
Algeria	MC Alger	2	1	1	0	6	2	+4
Algeria	USM Alger	2	1	1	0	3	2	+1
Subtotal		15	5	6	4	20	22	-2
Burkina Faso	ASFA Yennenga	2	2	0	0	3	0	+3
Subtotal		2	2	0	0	3	0	3
Cameroon	Diamant Yaoundé	2	1	0	0	3	3	0
Subtotal		2	1	0	0	3	3	0
Central African Republic	AS Tempête Mocaf	2	1	1	0	4	2	+2
Subtotal		2	1	1	0	4	2	+2
Democratic Republic of the Congo	TP Mazembe	2	1	0	1	3	2	+1
Subtotal		4	1	1	2	5	5	0
Republic of the Congo	CARA Brazzaville	2	1	0	1	3	4	-1
Subtotal		2	1	0	1	3	4	-1
Egypt	al-Ahly Cairo	4	2	1	1	5	5	0
Subtotal		4	2	1	1	5	5	0
Gabon	Petrosport FC	2	1	0	1	2	2	0
Subtotal		2	1	0	1	2	2	0
(The Gambia) Gambia	Wallidan FC	2	1	1	0	2	0	+2
(The Gambia) Gambia	Armed Forces FC	2	2	0	0	6	0	+6
Subtotal		4	3	1	0	8	0	+8
Guinea	AS Kaloum Star	2	0	0	2	3	6	-3
Guinea	Hafia FC	0	0	0	0	0	0	0
Subtotal		2	0	0	2	3	6	-3
Ivory Coast/ Côté d'Ivoire	ASEC Mimosas	2	1	0	1	2	2	0
Ivory Coast/ Côté d'Ivoire	Stella Club d'Adjamé	2	0	1	1	3	4	-1
Subtotal		4	1	1	2	5	6	-1
Mali	Stade Malien	2	1	0	1	4	1	-3
Subtotal		4	1	1	2	5	5	0
Morocco	RS Kenitra	2	2	0	0	2	0	+2
Morocco	MAS Fez	2	0	1	1	0	2	-2
Morocco	Raja Casablanca	8	4	0	4	8	9	-1
Morocco	RS Settat	2	1	1	0	2	0	+2
Subtotal		14	7	2	5	12	11	+1
Nigeria	Leventis United	2	0	0	2	0	2	-2
Nigeria	Lobi Stars	2	0	1	1	1	3	-2
Nigeria	Enyimba FC	2	0	1	1	0	4	-4
Subtotal		6	0	2	4	1	9	-8
Sierra Leone	Ports Authority FC	2	2	0	0	6	3	+3
Sierra Leone	Real Republicans	2	0	1	1	2	3	-1
Subtotal		4	2	1	1	8	6	+2
South Africa	Supersport United	2	1	1	0	3	2	+1
Subtotal		2	1	1	0	3	2	+1
Togo	ASKO Kara	2	1	0	1	5	1	+4
Subtotal		2	1	0	1	5	1	+4
Tunisia	Espérance ST	2	1	0	1	2	6	-4
Tunisia	ES Sahel	2	1	0	1	2	4	-2
Tunisia	CS Sfaxien	2	0	0	2	0	4	-4
Subtotal		6	2	0	4	4	14	-10
Zambia	Nchanga Rangers	2	0	2	0	0	0	0
Subtotal		2	0	2	0	0	0	0

==== Other statistics ====
- Total matches played at the CAF Champions League: 53
  - Total matches played at home: 26
  - Total matches played away: 27
- Total number of wins at the CAF Champions League:
  - Total home wins:
  - Total away wins:
- Total draws at the CAF Champions League:
  - Total home draws:
  - Total away draws:
- Total number of goals scored at the CAF Champions League:
- Total number of goals scored: 95
- Total matches played at cup competitions: 22
  - Total matches played at home: 11
  - Total matches played away: 11
  - Total matches played at cup competitions: 4
- Total number of wins at cup competitions:
  - Total home wins: 27
  - Total away wins: 19
- Total draws: 20
  - Total home draws: 12
  - Total away draws: 8
- Total number of goals scored at cup competitions:
  - Total number of goals scored at cup competitions:
