= ASC Diaraf in African football =

- Club: ASC Diaraf
- First entry: 1968 African Cup of Champions Clubs
- Latest entry: 2011 CAF Champions League

Titles
- Champions League: 0 (Best: Semi-Finals)
- Confederation Cup: 0 (Best: Second Round of 16)
- Cup Winners' Cup: 0 (Best: Second Round)
- CAF Cup: 0 (Best: Second Round)

ASC Diaraf (or Djaraf, partly known as Jaraaf, mostly used in the Gambia), a Senegalese professional association football club, has gained entry to Confederation of African Football (CAF) competitions on several occasions. They have represented Senegal in the Champions League on thirteen occasions, the Confederation Cup on four occasions, the now-defunct Cup Winners' Cup on three occasions, and the now-defunct CAF Cup one occasion.

Diaraf has appeared 21 times in continental competitions, the most of any Senegalese clubs.

== History ==
Diaraf later appeared in African competitions, their first was in 1968, later Diaraf lost to Stade Malien in the 1971 African Cup of Champions Clubs, in 1976, they defeated Os Balantas with a total of 10 goals and later Togo's Lomé I, Diaraf lost to Guinea's Hafia FC in the semis, a year later, they challenged ASC Garde Nationale from Mauritania and Hearts of Oak from Guinea. Five years later, Diaraf started in the preliminaries of the 1983 African Cup of Champions Clubs and headed up to the semis where they lost to Asante Kotoko FC, the second match with Africa Sports ended scoring 3–0 penalties as two matches were scoreless, Diaraf defeated JE Tizi-Ouzou of Algeria with their only goal in the first match to nil, in the quarterfinals, Diaraf with a total of three goals defeated Morocco's KAC de Kenitra, this was their greatest appearance Diaraf appeared in the 1990 edition and lost to Heartland FC in the first round as they scored just a goal in the home match. Diaraf challenged with three clubs up to CS Sfaxien in 1996 African Cup of Champions Clubs. In 2001 and under the new name CAF Champions League, Diaraf challenged Real de Banjul from the neighbouring Gambia and then lost to ASEC Mimosas by the away goals rule of one point. Three years later, Diaraf challenged with ASFAG and Enyimba in the 2004 CAF Champions League. A year later, Diaraf lost to Guiinea's Fello Star under the away goals role of two goals scored in Dakar, their third consecutive appearance was in 2006, Diaraf defeated Liberia's LPRC Oilers with three goals, then once more lost to Enyimba 2–0 as Diaraf scored nothing. The 2007 CAF Champions League was their fourth consecutive appearance, in the preliminaries, they lost to Maranatha FC of Togo, Diaraf just scored a goal in the home match. Their recent appearance was in 2011 where Diaraf advanced up to the second round, first they defeated the Gambia Ports Authority, then Mali's Djoliba AC and last Tunisia's Espérance ST where they lost 1–5 in two of its matches. Diaraf has appeared in the continental championship 13 times, the most of any club from Senegal. The total goals at the African Champions League for Diaraf is over 77.

Diaraf's appearance in the African cup competitions was in 1984 where they challenged with the Mighty Blackpool and Al-Ahly Tripoli. In 1986, they faced Starlight FC from neighboring Gambia and won 4–3 in penalties and CS Hammam-Lif from Tunisia and lost under the away goals rule. Their third competition in 1992 saw them lose to ASFAG. The next competition was the CAF Cup in 1999 where they played FC Man and WAC Casablanca. A decade later, Diaraf returned and this time under the CAF Confederation Cup in 2009 and lost to ASF Bobo-Dioulasso in the preliminaries, a year later, Diaraf went up to the preliminaries and lost 2-3 to FUS Rabat, their most recent competition was in 2014 where they lost 0-1 to Ebusua Dwarfs.

== CAF Competitions ==
ASC Diaraf's results in CAF competition
Season	Competition	Qualification method	Round	Opposition	Home	Away	Aggregate
1968	African Cup of Champions Clubs	Senegalese champions	First Round	(Morocco) FAR Rabat	1–0	2–0	1–2
1971	African Cup of Champions Clubs	Senegalese champions	First Round	(Mali) Stade Malien	3–0	4–0	3–4
1976	African Cup of Champions Clubs	Senegalese champions	Preliminary Round	(Guinea-Bissau) Os Balantas	6–1	1–4	10–2
1976	African Cup of Champions Clubs	Senegalese champions	First Round	(Togo) Lomé	1–0	1–1	2–1
1976	African Cup of Champions Clubs	Senegalese champions	Second Round	(Guinea) Hafia FC	2–2	4–0	2–6
1977	African Cup of Champions Clubs	Senegalese champions	Preliminary Round	(Mauritania) ASC Garde Nationale	3–0	0–2	5–0
1977	African Cup of Champions Clubs	Senegalese champions	First Round	(Ghana) Hearts of Oak	1–1	2–1	2–3
1983	African Cup of Champions Clubs	Senegalese champions	Preliminary Round	(The Gambia) Gambia Ports Authority	4–0	0–2	6–0
1983	African Cup of Champions Clubs	Senegalese champions	First Round	(Ivory Coast) Africa Sports	0–0	0–0	0–0 (3–0 pen.)
1983	African Cup of Champions Clubs	Senegalese champions	Second Round	(Algeria) JE Tizi-Ouzou	0–0	1–0	1–0
1983	African Cup of Champions Clubs	Senegalese champions	Quarter-finals	(Morocco) Kénitra AC	2–1	1–1	3–2
1983	African Cup of Champions Clubs	Senegalese champions	Semi-Finals	(Ghana) Asante Kotoko FC	2–1	2–0	2–3
1984	CAF Cup Winners' Cup	Senegalese Cup winners	Second Round	(Sierra Leone) Mighty Blackpool	2-0	1-2	3-2
1984	CAF Cup Winners' Cup	Senegalese Cup winners	Second Round	al-Ahly Tripoli	2-1	0-2	2-3
1986	CAF Cup Winners' Cup	Senegalese Cup winners	First Round	(The Gambia) Starlight FC	1–1	1–1	1–1 (4–3 pen)
1986	CAF Cup Winners' Cup	Senegalese Cup winners	Second Round	CS Hammam-Lif	2–2	0–1	2–3
1990	African Cup of Champions Clubs	Senegalese champions	First Round	(Nigeria) Heartland FC	1–0	3–0	1–3
1992	CAF Cup Winners' Cup	Senegalese Cup winners	First Round	(Guinea) ASFAG	2–2	1–0	2–3
1996	African Cup of Champions Clubs	Senegalese champions	Preliminary Round	(Guinea) AS Kaloum Star	0–0	1–1	1–1 (a)
1996	African Cup of Champions Clubs	Senegalese champions	First Round	(Ivory Coast) ASEC	0–0	1–1	1–1 (a)
1996	African Cup of Champions Clubs	Senegalese champions	Second Round	(Tunisia) CS Sfaxien	3–1	5–0	3–6
1999	CAF Cup	Senegalese Cup winners	First Round	(Ivory Coast) FC Man	1–0	0–3	1–3
1999	CAF Cup	Senegalese Cup winners	Second Round	(Morocco) WAC Casablanca	1–1	2–1	2–3
2001	CAF Champions League	Senegalese champions	Preliminary Round	(The Gambia) Real de Banjul	1–0	1–1	2–1
2001	CAF Champions League	Senegalese champions	First Round	(Ivory Coast) ASEC	2–0	0–2	2–2 (2–4 pen.)
2004	CAF Champions League	Senegalese runner-up	Preliminary Round	(Guinea) ASFAG	1–0	1–2	3–1
2004	CAF Champions League	Senegalese runner-up	Second Round	(Nigeria) Enyimba	2–0	3–0	2–3
2005	CAF Champions League	Senegalese champions	Preliminary Round	(Guinea) Fello Star	0–1	2–1	3–1
2006	CAF Champions League	Senegalese runner-up	Preliminary Round	(Liberia) LPRC Oilers	3–2	0–0	3–2
2006	CAF Champions League	Senegalese runner-up	First Round	(Nigeria) Enyimba	0–0	2–0	0–2
2007	CAF Champions League	Senegalese runner-up	Preliminary Round	(Togo) Maranatha FC	1–0	3–0	1–3
2009	CAF Confederation Cup	Senegalese Cup winners	Preliminary Round	(Burkina Faso) ASF Bobo-Dioulasso	1–1	0–0	1–1 (a)
2010	CAF Confederation Cup	Senegalese Cup winners	Preliminary Round	(Morocco) FUS Rabat	2–1	2–0	2–3
2011	CAF Champions League	Senegalese champions	Preliminary Round	(The Gambia) Ports Authority	2–0	1–1	3–2
2011	CAF Champions League	Senegalese champions	First Round	(Mali) Djoliba AC	3–0	1–1	4–1
2011	CAF Champions League	Senegalese champions	Second Round	(Tunisia) Espérance ST	1–0	5–0	1–5
2011	CAF Confederation Cup		Second Round of 16	(Algeria) JS Kabylie	1–1	2–0	1–3
2014	CAF Confederation Cup	Senegalese Cup Winners	Preliminary Round	(Ghana) Ebusua Dwarfs	0–0	1–0	0–1

== Non-CAF Competitions ==
=== WAFU Club Championship ===
ASC Diaraf results at the WAFU Club Championship
Season	Competition	Qualification method	Round	Opposition	Home	Away	Aggregate
1987	WAFU Club Championship	Division 1 Runner-up	Preliminary Round	(Nigeria) Iwuanyanwu Nationale	3–0	3–0	3–3 (0–3 p.)
1993	WAFU Club Championship	Division 1, 5th place	Preliminary Round	(Ghana) Neoplan Stars	5–0	2–1	6–2
1993	WAFU Club Championship	Division 1, 5th place	Quarterfinals	(Togo) Gomido Kpalimé	1–2	0–1	2–2

== Statistics ==
=== By season ===
Information correct as of 1 November 2014.
Key

- Pld = Played
- W = Games won
- D = Games drawn
- L = Games lost
- F = Goals for
- A = Goals against
- Grp = Group stage
- PR = Preliminary round
- R1 = First round
- R2 = Second round
- SR16 = Second Round of 16
- R16 = Round of 16
- QF = Quarter-final
- SF = Semi-final

Key to colours and symbols:

W	Winners
RU	Runners-up

ASC Diaraf record in African football by season
Season	Competition	Pld	W	D	L	GF	GA	GD	Round
1968	African Cup of Champions Clubs	2	1	0	1	1	2	-1	First Round
1971	African Cup of Champions Clubs	2	1	0	1	3	4	-1	First Round
1976	African Cup of Champions Clubs	6	3	1	2	14	9	+4	Second Round
1977	African Cup of Champions Clubs	4	1	1	2	7	3	+4	First Round
1983	African Cup of Champions Clubs	10	6	3	2	12	5	+7	Semifinals
1984	African Cup Winners' Cup	4	3	0	1	5	5	0	First Round
1986	African Cup Winners' Cup	4	0	3	1	3	4	-1	Second Round
1990	African Cup of Champions Clubs	2	1	0	1	1	3	-2	First Round
1992	African Cup Winners' Cup	2	0	1	1	2	3	-1	First Round
1996	African Cup of Champions Clubs	6	1	4	1	5	8	-3	Second Round
1999	CAF Cup	4	1	1	2	4	6	-2	Second Round
2001	CAF Champions League	4	2	1	1	4	3	+1	First Round
2004	CAF Champions League	4	3	0	1	5	4	-1	Second Round
2005	CAF Champions League	2	0	0	1	3	1	-2	Preliminary Round
2006	CAF Champions League	4	1	2	1	3	4	-1	First Round
2007	CAF Champions League	2	1	0	1	1	3	-2	Preliminary Round
2009	CAF Confederation Cup	2	1	0	1	1	1	0	Preliminary Round
2010	CAF Confederation Cup	2	1	0	1	2	3	-1	Preliminary Round
2011	CAF Champions League	6	3	2	1	8	8	0	Second Round
2011	CAF Confederation Cup	2	0	1	1	1	3	-2	Second Round of 16
2014	CAF Confederation Cup	2	1	1	0	0	1	-1	Preliminary Round

=== By competition ===
==== In Africa ====
As of 16 February 2015:

CAF competitions
Competition	Seasons	Played	Won	Drawn	Lost	Goals For	Goals Against	Last season played
Champions League	13	54	22	17	14	66	58	2011 CAF Champions League
CAF Cup Winners' Cup	3	10	3	4	3	12	12	1992 African Cup Winners' Cup
CAF Confederation Cup	4	8	1	4	3	4	8	2014 CAF Confederation Cup
CAF Cup	1	4	2	1	1	6	3	1999 CAF Cup
Total	21	76	28	26	21	88	81	

==== Non-CAF competitions ====
The French West African Cup was a football (soccer) tournament between clubs of the former French Western African territories, it existed from 1947 to 1960.

  - 1948: Foyer France 4 – 0 Jeunesse Club d'Abidjan
  - 1952: Lost to Etoile Sportive Porto-Novo of Dahomey (now Benin) in the semis
  - 1956: Lost to Jeanne d'Arc (now Stade Malien) of Mali (then also known as the French Sudan) in the semis
  - 1958: Lost to Africa Sports in the semis

== Statistics by country ==
=== CAF Competitions ===
Country	Club	P	W	D	L	GF	GA	GD
Algeria	JS Kabylie	4	1	2	1	2	3	-1
Subtotal		4	1	2	1	2	3	-1
Burkina Faso	ASF Bobo-Dioulasso	2	1	0	1	1	1	0
Subtotal		2	1	0	1	1	1	0
Ivory Coast/ Ivory Coast	Africa Sports	2	0	2	0	0	0	0
Ivory Coast/ Ivory Coast	ASEC Mimosas	4	1	2	1	3	3	0
Ivory Coast/ Ivory Coast	FC Man	2	1	0	1	1	3	-2
Subtotal		8	2	4	2	4	6	-2
(The Gambia) Gambia	Gambia Ports Authority	4	3	1	0	9	2	+7
(The Gambia) Gambia	Real de Banjul	2	1	1	0	2	1	+1
(The Gambia) Gambia	Starlight FC	2	0	1	0	1	1	0
Subtotal		8	4	3	0	12	4	+8
Ghana	Asante Kotoko FC	2	1	0	1	2	3	-1
Ghana	Ebusua Dwarfs	2	1	0	1	0	1	-1
Ghana	Hearts of Oak	2	0	1	1	2	3	-1
Subtotal		6	2	1	3	4	7	-3
Guinea	ASFAG	4	2	1	1	5	4	+1
Guinea	Fello Star	2	0	0	2	3	1	-2
Guinea	Hafia FC	2	0	1	1	2	6	-4
Guinea	AS Kaloum Star	2	0	2	0	1	1	0
Subtotal		10	2	4	4	11	12	-1
Guinea-Bissau
Guinea-Bissau	Os Balantas	2	2	0	0	10	2	+8
Subtotal		2	2	0	0	10	2	+8
Liberia	LPRC Oilers	2	1	1	0	3	2	+1
Subtotal		2	1	1	0	3	2	+1
Mali	Djoliba AC	2	1	1	0	4	1	3
Mali	Stade Malien	2	1	0	1	3	4	-1
Subtotal		4	2	1	1	7	5	+2
Mauritania	ASC Garde Nationale	2	1	0	1	5	0	+5
Subtotal		2	1	0	1	5	0	+5
Morocco	WAC Casablanca	2	0	1	1	2	3	-1
Morocco	Kenitra AC	2	1	1	0	3	2	1
Morocco	FAR Rabat	2	1	0	1	1	2	-1
Morocco	FUS Rabat	2	1	0	1	2	3	-1
Subtotal		8	3	2	3	8	10	-2
Nigeria	Heartland FC	2	1	0	1	1	3	-2
Nigeria	Enyimba	4	1	1	2	2	5	-3
Subtotal		6	2	1	3	3	8	-5
Togo	Lomé	2	1	1	0	2	1	+1
Togo	Maranatha FC	2	1	0	1	1	3	-2
Subtotal		4	2	1	1	3	4	-1
Tunisia	Espérance ST	2	1	0	1	1	5	-4
Tunisia	CS Hammam-Lif	2	0	1	1	2	3	-1
Tunisia	CS Sfaxien	2	1	0	1	3	6	-3
Subtotal		6	2	1	3	6	14	-8

==== Other statistics ====
- Total matches played at the CAF Champions League: 54
  - Total matches played at home: 29
  - Total matches played away: 29
- Total number of wins at the CAF Champions League: 27
  - Total home wins: 21
  - Total away wins: 6
- Total draws at the CAF Champions League: 13
  - Total home draws: 7
  - Total away draws: 6
- Total number of goals scored at the CAF Champions League: 69
- Total matches played at cup competitions: 22
  - Total matches played at home: 11
  - Total matches played away: 11
  - Total matches played at the CAF Cup: 4
- Total number of wins at cup competitions: 7
  - Total home wins: 6
  - Total away wins: 1
- Total draws at cup competitions: 7
  - Total home draws: 5
  - Total away draws: 2
- Total number of goals scored at cup competitions: 17
  - Total number of goals scored at the CAF Cup: 3
