= Senegalese football clubs in African competitions =

Senegalese football clubs have participated in African football competitions since 1965 when US Gorée took part in the African Club of Championships Clubs. In total, 20 Senegalese clubs have participated in African competitions. Among the teams that have participated more than once in African competitions Jeanne d'Arc is the only one with more wins than defeats. The biggest success was the participation of Jeanne d'Arc in the final of the CAF Cup, in 1998.

== Appearances in CAF competitions ==
As of March 2017

	CAF Champions League					CAF Confederation Cup					CAF Cup Winners' Cup					CAF Cup					Total				
club	App	Mat	W	D	L	App	Mat	W	D	L	App	Mat	W	D	L	App	Mat	W	D	L	App	Mat	W	D	L
Diaraf	13	54	22	17	14	3	10	3	4	3	4	8	1	4	3	1	4	2	1	1	21	76	28	26	21
ASC Jeanne d'Arc	9	54	26	10	19	0	0	0	0	0	4	18	7	6	8	2	12	5	4	3	15	84	38	20	27
AS Douanes	6	22	7	8	7	2	10	3	4	3	3	6	1	1	4	0	0	0	0	0	11	38	15	17	20
US Gorée	5	18	9	3	6	1	2	2	1	1	3	8	3	2	3	0	0	0	0	0	9	28	14	6	10
ASEC Ndiambour	2	7	4	1	2	1	2	0	1	1	2	6	2	2	2	3	12	2	8	2	8	27	8	12	7
Diourbel	4	8	3	0	5	0	0	0	0	0	1	2	0	1	1	1	4	0	4	0	6	14	3	5	6
Casa Sports	3	10	2	1	7	2	4	1	1	2	0	0	0	0	0	0	0	0	0	0	5	14	3	2	9
AS Police	1	6	4	1	1	0	0	0	0	0	3	12	4	5	3	0	0	0	0	0	4	18	8	6	5
ASFA Dakar	3	8	3	2	2	0	0	0	0	0	0	0	0	0	0	0	0	0	0	0	3	8	3	2	2
Richard-Toll	0	0	0	0	0	1	4	1	0	3	0	0	0	0	0	1	4	2	0	2	2	8	3	0	5
Touré Kunda	0	0	0	0	0	1	4	2	1	1	0	0	0	0	0	0	0	0	0	0	1	4	2	1	1
AS Pikine	1	4	1	2	1	0	0	0	0	0	0	0	0	0	0	0	0	0	0	0	1	4	1	2	1
Olympique Ngor	0	0	0	0	0	1	4	1	0	3	0	0	0	0	0	0	0	0	0	0	1	4	1	0	3
US Ouakam	1	2	1	0	1	0	0	0	0	0	0	0	0	0	0	0	0	0	0	0	1	2	1	0	1
Diambars Saly	1	2	0	2	0	0	0	0	0	0	0	0	0	0	0	0	0	0	0	0	1	2	0	2	0
ASC Niarry Tally	0	0	0	0	0	1	2	1	0	1	0	0	0	0	0	0	0	0	0	0	1	2	1	0	1
ASC Yeggo	0	0	0	0	0	1	2	1	0	1	0	0	0	0	0	0	0	0	0	0	1	2	1	0	1
Génération Foot de Sangalkam	0	0	0	0	0	1	2	0	1	1	0	0	0	0	0	0	0	0	0	0	1	2	0	1	1
ASC HLM	0	0	0	0	0	1	2	0	0	2	0	0	0	0	0	0	0	0	0	0	1	2	0	0	2
Entente Ouakam	0	0	0	0	0	0	0	0	0	0	0	0	0	0	0	1	2	0	0	2	1	2	0	0	2

== African Cup of Champions Clubs/CAF Champions League ==
Season	Club	Round	Opponent	Home	Away	Aggregate
1964–65	Espoir de Saint-Louis	First Round	(Mali) Stade Malien	1–1	4–1	
1966	US Gorée	First Round	(Guinea) AS Kaloum Star	w/o^{1}		
1968	Foyer France Senegal	First Round	(Morocco) FAR Rabat	1–0	2–0	
1970	ASC Jeanne d'Arc	Preliminary Round	(Algeria) CR Belcourt	canc.	3–5	
1970	ASC Jeanne d'Arc	First Round	(Guinea) AS Kaloum Star	2–3	3–1	
1971	ASC Diaraf	First Round	(Mali) Stade Malien	3–0	4–0	
1972	ASFA Dakar	First Round	(Republic of Dahomey) AS Cotonou	3–0	2–3	
1972	ASFA Dakar	Second Round	(Mali) Djoliba AC	2–0	2–0^{2}	
1973	ASFA Dakar	First Round	(Togo) Modèle Lomé	2–2	4–2	
1974	ASC Jeanne d'Arc	First Round	(Sierra Leone) Ports Authority FC	3–1	2–3	
1974	ASC Jeanne d'Arc	Second Round	(Guinea) Hafia FC	canc.	canc.	
1974	ASC Jeanne d'Arc	Quarterfinals	(Ivory Coast) ASEC	1–0	1–2	
1974	ASC Jeanne d'Arc	Semifinals	CARA Brazzaville	1–0	2–2 (a)	
1975	ASFA Dakar	First Round	(Ivory Coast) ASEC Mimosas	1–1	1–1 (5–6 pen.)	
1976	ASC Diaraf	Preliminary Round	(Guinea-Bissau) Os Balantas	6–1	1–4	
1976	ASC Diaraf	First Round	(Togo) Lomé	1–0	1–1	
1976	ASC Diaraf	Second Round	(Guinea) Hafia FC	2–2	4–0	
1977	ASC Diaraf	Preliminary Round	(Mauritania) ASC Garde Nationale	3–0	0–2	
1977	ASC Diaraf	First Round	(Ghana) Hearts of Oak	1–1	2–1	
1979	US Gorée	First Round	(Mauritania) ASC Garde Nationale	2–0	1–1	
1979	US Gorée	Second Round	Étoile du Congo	1–0	2–3	
1979	US Gorée	Quarterfinals	(Nigeria) Racca Rovers	2–0	1–0	
1979	US Gorée	Semifinals	(Ghana) Hearts of Oak	1–2	4–1	
1980	Casa Sports	Preliminary Round	(Guinea-Bissau) Bula FC	5–1	1–0	
1980	Casa Sports	First Round	(Algeria) MA Hussein Dey	0–2	1–1	
1980	AS Police	First Round	(Sierra Leone) Mighty Blackpool	2–1	0–2	
1980	AS Police	Second Round	(Togo) AS Semassi FC	1–0	1–1	
1980	AS Police	Quarterfinals	(Cameroon) Union Douala	3–2	3–0	
1981	Djourbel^{3}	First Round	(Ivory Coast) ASEC Mimosas	2–1	2–1 (3–4 p.)	
1982	US Gorée	First Round	(Gabon) US Mbila Nzambi	w/o^{1}		
1983	ASC Diaraf	Preliminary Round	(The Gambia) Gambia Ports Authority	4–0	0–2	
1983	ASC Diaraf	First Round	(Ivory Coast) Africa Sports	0–0	0–0 (3–0 pen.)	
1983	ASC Diaraf	Second Round	(Algeria) JE Tizi-Ouzou	1–0	0–0	
1983	ASC Diaraf	Quarterfinals	(Morocco) KAC de Kenitra	2–1	1–1	
1983	ASC Diaraf	Semifinals	(Ghana) Asante Kotoko FC	2–1	2–0	
1984	Djourbel^{2}	First Round	(Nigeria) Shooting Stars FC	1–0	2–0	
1985	US Gorée	First Round	(Ivory Coast) Stella Club d'Adjamé	3–0	1–1	
1985	US Gorée	Second Round	(Ghana) Hearts of Oak	3–0	0–2	
1985	US Gorée	Quarterfinals	(Zimbabwe) Black Rhinos FC	3–0	0–2	
1985	US Gorée	Semifinals	AS Bilima	1–0	0–2	
1986	ASC Jeanne d'Arc	First Round	(Morocco) MAS Fez	0–0	0–2	
1987	ASC Jeanne d'Arc	First Round	(Algeria) EP Sétif	2–1	2–0	
1988	Djourbel^{3}	First Round	ASC Police	2–0	2–0 (9–10 p.)	
1989	ASC Jeanne d'Arc	First Round	(Morocco) Raja Casablanca	1–0	2–0	
1990	ASC Diaraf	First Round	(Nigeria) Heartland FC	1–0	3–0	
1991	ASC Port Autonome	First Round	(Mali) Djoliba AC	0–0	1–0	
1992	ASC Port Autonome	Preliminary Round	Sporting Praia	0–0	0–0 (1–3 pen)	
1993	ASEC Ndiambour	Preliminary Round	(Cape Verde) CS Mindelense	2–1	1–1	
1993	ASEC Ndiambour	First Round	(Morocco) Wydad Casablanca	2–1	3–1	
1996	ASC Diaraf	Preliminary Round	(Guinea) Kaloum Star	0–0	1–1 (a)	
1996	ASC Diaraf	First Round	(Ivory Coast) ASEC	0–0	1–1 (a)	
1996	ASC Diaraf	Second Round	(Tunisia) CS Sfaxien	3–1	5–0	
1997	Djourbel^{4}	First Round	(Morocco) Raja Casablanca	0–2	3–1	
1998	AS Douanes	Preliminary Round	(The Gambia) Wallidan FC	2–0	0–0	
1998	AS Douanes	First Round	(Algeria) CS Constantine	2–1	0–0	
1998	AS Douanes	Second Round	(Morocco) Raja Casablanca	1–0	2–0	
1999	ASEC Ndiambour	Preliminary Round	(Liberia) Invincible Eleven	4–0	w/o	
1999	ASEC Ndiambour	Second Round	(Morocco) Raja Casablanca	2–1	3–1	
2000	ASC Jeanne d'Arc	First Round	(Algeria) MC Alger	5–1	1–1	
2000	ASC Jeanne d'Arc	Second Round	(Morocco) Raja Casablanca	1–0	1–2	
2000	ASC Jeanne d'Arc	Group Stage	(Nigeria) Lobi Stars	0–0	1–3	
2000	ASC Jeanne d'Arc	Group Stage	(Ghana) Hearts of Oak	2–4	1–1	
2000	ASC Jeanne d'Arc	Group Stage	(Egypt) al-Ahly	1–1	1–3	
2001	ASC Diaraf	Preliminary Round	(The Gambia) Real de Banjul	1–0	1–1	
2001	ASC Diaraf	First Round	(Ivory Coast) ASEC	2–0	0–2 (2–4 pen.)	
2002	ASC Jeanne d'Arc	First Round	(Algeria) CR Belouizdad	1–0	1–1	
2002	ASC Jeanne d'Arc	Second Round	(Mali) Stade Malien	2–1	0–3	
2002	ASC Jeanne d'Arc	Group Stage	(Egypt) al-Ahly	2–1	2–1	
2002	ASC Jeanne d'Arc	Group Stage	(Democratic Republic of the Congo) TP Mazembe	0–1	1–3	
2002	ASC Jeanne d'Arc	Group Stage	(Morocco) Raja Casablanca	1–2	1–2	
2003	ASC Jeanne d'Arc	Preliminary Round	(Burkina Faso) ASFA Yennenga	2–0	0–1	
2003	ASC Jeanne d'Arc	Semifinals	(Nigeria) Enyimba	0–0	1–4	
2004	ASC Diaraf	Preliminary Round	(Guinea) ASFAG	1–0	1–2	
2004	ASC Diaraf	First Round	(Nigeria) Enyimba	2–0	3–0	
2004	ASC Jeanne d'Arc	Preliminary Round	(The Gambia) Armed Forces	3–0	0–3	
2004	ASC Jeanne d'Arc	First Round	(Morocco) Raja Casablanca	2–0	0–2	
2004	ASC Jeanne d'Arc	Second Round	(Cameroon) Canon Yaoundé	2–0	1–2	
2004	ASC Jeanne d'Arc	Group Stage	(Algeria) USM Alger	2–1	1–1	
2004	ASC Jeanne d'Arc	Group Stage	(Tunisia) Espérance ST	2–1	0–5	
2004	ASC Jeanne d'Arc	Group Stage	(South Africa) Supersport United	2–0	1–1	
2004	ASC Jeanne d'Arc	Semifinals	(Tunisia) ES Sahel	2–1	3–0	
2005	ASC Diaraf	First Round	(Guinea) Fello Star	0–1	2–1	
2005	AS Douanes	Preliminary Round	(Mali) Djoliba AC	1–0	1–1	
2005	AS Douanes	First Round	(Tunisia) ES Sahel	0–0	1–3	
2006	ASC Diaraf	Preliminary Round	(Liberia) LPRC Oilers	3–2	0–0	
2006	ASC Diaraf	First Round	(Nigeria) Enyimba	0–0	2–0	
2006	ASC Port Autonome	Preliminary Round	(Togo) AS Douanes de Lomé	3–2	0–0	
2006	ASC Port Autonome	First Round	(Algeria) USM Alger	2–1	3–2 (a)	
2006	ASC Port Autonome	Second Round	(Ivory Coast) ASEC (Mimosas)	1–0	6–0	
2007	ASC Diaraf	First Round	(Togo) Maranatha FC	1–0	3–0	
2007	AS Douanes	First Round	(Mali) Stade Malien	2–0	2–1	
2008	AS Douanes	Preliminary Round	(Burkina Faso) Commune FC	0–0	3–2	
2008	AS Douanes	First Round	(Tunisia) ES Sahel	3–0	5–0	
2008	ASC Saloum	Preliminary Round	(Tunisia) Club Africain	0–1	2–1	
2009	Casa Sports	Preliminary Round	(Mali) Djoliba AC	0–4	1–0	
2009	AS Douanes	Preliminary Round	(Sierra Leone) Ports Authority	3–1	1–0	
2009	AS Douanes	First Round	(Nigeria) Kano Pillars	1–1	0–0	
2010	ASC Linguère	Preliminary Round	(Ghana) Asante Kotoko	2–0	0–2 (4–2 pen)	
2010	ASC Linguère	First Round	(Mali) Djoliba AC	1–0	0–1 (3-4 pen)	
2011	ASC Diaraf	Preliminary Round	(The Gambia) Gambia Ports Authority	2–0	1–1	
2011	ASC Diaraf	First Round	(Mali) Djoliba AC	3–0	1–1	
2011	ASC Diaraf	Second Round	(Tunisia) Espérance ST	1–0	5–0	
2012	US Ouakam	Preliminary Round	(The Gambia) Brikama United	1–0	0–1 (3–5 pen)	
2013	Casa Sports	Preliminary Round	(Morocco) Moghreb de Tétouan	1–0	1–0 (3–1 pen)	
2013	Casa Sports	First Round	(Mali) Stade Malien	1–2	0–2	
2014	Diambars Saly	Preliminary Round	(Burkina Faso) ASFA Yennenga	1–1	1–1 (2–4 pen)	
2015	AS Pikine	Preliminary Round	(Burkina Faso) Étoile Filante de Ouagadougou	1–0	0–0	
2015	AS Pikine	Second Round	(Algeria) USM Alger	1–1	5–1	
2016	AS Douanes	Preliminary Round	(Guinea) Horoya AC	0–0	0–4	
2017	US Gorée	Preliminary Round	(Guinea) Horoya AC	0–0	1–2	
2018	Génération Foot	Preliminary Round	(Egypt) Misr Lel Makkasa	2–0	0–0	2–0
2018	Génération Foot	First Round	(Guinea) Horoya	1–2	0–2	1–4
2018–19	ASC Jaraaf	Preliminary Round	(Togo) US Koroki	1–0	0–1	1–1 (4–2 p)
2018–19	ASC Jaraaf	First Round	(Morocco) Wydad	3–1	0–2	3–3 (a)
2019–20	Génération Foot	Preliminary Round	(Liberia) LPRC Oilers	3–0	0–1	3–1
2019–20	Génération Foot	First Round	(Egypt) Zamalek	2–1	0–1	2–2 (a)
2020–21	Teungueth	Preliminary Round	(The Gambia) Gambia Armed Forces	2–0	1–1	3–1
2020–21	Teungueth	First Round	(Morocco) Raja Casablanca	0–0	0–0	0–0 (3–1 p)
2020–21	Teungueth	Group stage: 4th place	(Tunisia) Espérance de Tunis	2–1	1–2	
2020–21	Teungueth	Group stage: 4th place	(Algeria) MC Alger	0–1	1–0	
2020–21	Teungueth	Group stage: 4th place	(Egypt) Zamalek	0–0	1–4	
2021–22	Teungueth	First Round	(Ivory Coast) ASEC Mimosas	0–1	0–1	0–2
2022–23	Casa Sports	First Round	(Algeria) JS Kabylie	1–0	0–3	1–3
2023–24	Génération Foot	First Round	(Guinea) Hafia	2–2	0–0	2–2 (a)
2024–25	Teungueth	First Round	(Ivory Coast) Stade d'Abidjan	1–1	1–1	2–2 (4–5 p)
2025–26	ASC Jaraaf	First Round	(Cameroon) Colombe Sportive	0–1	0–0	0–1
2026–27	Teungueth	First Round	(Guinea-Bissau) Canchungo	1–0	1–0	2–0
2026–27	Teungueth	Second Round	(Cameroon) Colombe Sportive			

== African (CAF) Cup Winner's Cup/CAF Confederation Cup ==
Season	Club	Round	Opponent	Home	Away	Aggregate
1975	ASC Jeanne d'Arc	Round of 8	(The Gambia) Wallidan FC	2–0	0–0	
1975	ASC Jeanne d'Arc	Quarterfinals	(Central African Republic) AS Tempête Mocaf	1–1	3–1	
1975	ASC Jeanne d'Arc	Semifinals	(Ivory Coast) Stella Club d'Adjamé	2–2	1–2	
1976	US Gorée	Second Round	(Ivory Coast) Stella Club d'Adjamé	0–0	2–0	
1977	AS Police	Second Round	(Gabon) Anges ABC	8–1	0–0	
1977	AS Police	Quarterfinals	(Nigeria) Enugu Rangers	0–0	2–1	
1981	ASC Jeanne d'Arc	First Round	(Sierra Leone) Real Republicans F.C.	2–0	1–1	
1982	AS Police	First Round	(Liberia) Mighty Barrolle	1–0	0–0	
1982	AS Police	Second Round	(Ghana) Hearts of Oak	2–0	0–0 (1–3 pen.)	
1983	AS Police	First Round	(Morocco) Raja Casablanca	1–0	0–0	
1983	AS Police	Second Round	(Guinea) Horoya AC	1–2	1–0	
1984	ASC Diaraf	First Round	(Sierra Leone) Mighty Blackpool	2–0	1–2	
1984	ASC Diaraf	Second Round	al-Ahly Tripoli	2–1	2–0	
1986	ASC Diaraf	First Round	(The Gambia) Starlight FC	1–1	1–1 (4–3 pen)	
1986	ASC Diaraf	Second Round	CS Hammam-Lif	2–2	1–0	
1987	AS Douanes	First Round	(Ivory Coast) ASEC Mimosas	1–4	2–0	
1988	ASC Jeanne d'Arc	Preliminary Round	(Algeria) CR Belcourt	canc.	3–5	
1988	ASC Jeanne d'Arc	First Round	(Guinea) AS Kaloum Star	2–3	3–1	
1989	ASC Linguère	First Round	(Burkina Faso) Bobo-Dioulasso	2–1	1–0	
1990	US Ouakam	First Round	(Cameroon) Tonnerre Yaoundé	2–0	0–1	
1990	US Ouakam	Second Round	(Benin) Requins de l'Atlantique FC	1–0	0–0	
1990	US Ouakam	Quarterfinals	(Nigeria) BCC Lions	0–1	3–1	
1991	ASC Linguère	First Round	(Tunisia) ES Sétif	1–0	1–7	
1992	ASC Diaraf	Preliminary Round	(Guinea) ASFAG	2–2	1–0	
1993	US Gorée	First Round	(Ghana) Voradep	1–0	0–0	
1993	US Gorée	Semifinals	(Tunisia) Stade Tunisien	1–0	2–0	
1996	AS Douanes	First Round	(Ghana) Great Olympics	canc.	canc.	
1996	AS Douanes	Second Round	(Algeria) CR Belouizdad	0–0	0–2	
1997	US Gorée	First Round	(Algeria) MC Oran	2–0	1–1	
1999	ASC Yeggo	First Round	(Morocco) FAR Rabat	1–0	2–0	
2000	ASEC Ndiambour	First Round	(Ivory Coast) ASEC Mimosas	2–0	3–1	
2000	ASEC Ndiambour	Second Round	(Angola) GD Sagrada Esperança	0–0	1–1	
2000	ASEC Ndiambour	Quarterfinals	(Egypt) Zamalek SC	1–0	3–1	
2002	SONACOS Djourbel^{4}	First Round	(Morocco) Wydad Casablanca	0–0	3–0	
2003	AS Douanes	Second Round	(Mali) Cercle Olympique de Bamako (COB)	0–2	0–1	
2004	AS Douanes	First Round	(Angola) Interclube	2–1	2–1 (a)	
2004	AS Douanes	Second Round	(Cameroon) PWD Bamenda	3–0	2–2	
2004	AS Douanes	Intermediate Round	(Ghana) Hearts of Oak	0–0	0–1	
2005	ASEC Ndiambour	Intermediate Round	(Ghana) King Faisal Babes	1–1	3–0	
2005	ASC Port Autonome	Intermediate Round	(Angola) Petro Atlético	0–1	w/o	
2006	Richard Toll^{5}	First Round	(Sierra Leone) Mighty Blackpool	2–0	2–1	
2006	Richard Toll^{5}	Second Round	(Tunisia) Espérance ST	0–1	3–0	
2006	AS Douanes	First Round	(Algeria) ASO Chlef	1–0	0–0	
2006	AS Douanes	Second Round	(Algeria) MA Hussein Dey	1–1	0–2	
2007	US Gorée	Preliminary Round	(Liberia) NPA Anchors	1–0	2–3	
2007	US Gorée	First Round	(Morocco) Hassania Agadir	0–0	2–3	
2007	US Ouakam	First Round	(Burkina Faso) Étoile Filante Ouagadougou	1–0	0–1 (3–4 pen.)	
2008	Casa Sport	First Round	(Nigeria) Dolphins Port Harcourt	1–2	0–0	
2008	ASC Linguère	First Round	(Ivory Coast) Bingerville	3–0	3–0 (4-2 pen)	
2008	ASC Linguère	First Round of 16	(Tunisia) CS Sfaxien	3–2	2–1	
2009	ASC Diaraf	First Round	(Burkina Faso) Bobo-Dioulasso	1–1	0–0	
2010	ASC Diaraf	Preliminary Round	(Morocco) FUS Rabat	2–1	2–0	
2011	ASC Diaraf	Second Round of 16	(Algeria) JS Kabylie	1–1	2–0	
2011	Touré Kunda	Preliminary Round	(Sierra Leone) Ports Authority	2–1	2–2	
2011	Touré Kunda	First Round	(Morocco) FUS Rabat	2–1	2–0	
2012	Casa Sport	Preliminary Round	(The Gambia) Gamtel	1–0	1–0 (3–4 p)	
2013	ASC HLM	Preliminary Round	(The Gambia) Gamtel	1–3	2–1	
2014	ASC Diaraf	Preliminary Round	(Ghana) Ebusua Dwarfs	0–0	1–0	
2015	Olympique de Ngor	Preliminary Round	(Cameroon) Unisport de Bafang	3–1	1–0	
2015	Olympique de Ngor	First Round	(Ghana) Hearts of Oak	2–3	2–1	
2016	Génération Foot de Sangalkam	Preliminary Round	(Nigeria) Nasarawa United	0–0	2–1	
2017	ASC Niary Tally	Preliminary Round	(Cameroon) APEJES Academy	2–1	1–0 (a)	
2018	Mbour Petite-Côte	Preliminary Round	(Morocco) RS Berkane	1–1	1–2	2–3
2018	Génération Foot	Play-off Round	(Morocco) RS Berkane	3–1	0–2	3–3 (a)
2018–19	Génération Foot	Preliminary Round	(Mali) Djoliba	0–0	1–0	1–0
2018–19	Génération Foot	First Round	(Morocco) Hassania Agadir	1–0	0–2	1–2
2018–19	ASC Diaraf	Play-off Round	(Morocco) RS Berkane	2–0	1–5	3–5
2019–20	Génération Foot	Play-off Round	(Benin) ESAE FC	0–1	1–0	1–1 (3–4 p)
2020–21	ASC Jaraaf	Preliminary Round	(Nigeria) Kano Pillars	3–1	0–0	3–1
2020–21	ASC Jaraaf	First Round	(Ivory Coast) FC San Pédro	0–1	2–1	2–2 (a)
2020–21	ASC Jaraaf	Play-off Round	(Zimbabwe) FC Platinum	1–0	1–0	2–0
2020–21	ASC Jaraaf	Group stage: 1st place	(Tunisia) CS Sfaxien	1–1	0–0	
2020–21	ASC Jaraaf	Group stage: 1st place	(Tunisia) Étoile du Sahel	1–0	0–2	
2020–21	ASC Jaraaf	Group stage: 1st place	(Burkina Faso) Salitas	2–0	1–0	
2020–21	ASC Jaraaf	Quarter-finals	(Cameroon) Coton Sport	2–1	0–1	2–2 (a)
2021–22	Diambars FC	First Round	(Guinea) Wakriya AC			3–0 (Note: Matches involving Guinean clubs were played over a single leg in their opponent's country due to the political and security situation in Guinea following a coup d'état.)
2021–22	Diambars FC	Second Round	(Nigeria) Enyimba	0–1	0–3	0–4
2023–24	Casa Sports	First Round	(Burkina Faso) EF Ouagadougou	1–1	0–0	1–1 (a)
2024–25	ASC Jaraaf	First Round	(Sierra Leone) East End Lions	3–0	1–0	4–0
2024–25	ASC Jaraaf	Second Round	(Ivory Coast) RC Abidjan	3–0	0–0	3–0
2024–25	ASC Jaraaf	Group stage: 3rd place	(Algeria) USM Alger	0–0	0–2	
2024–25	ASC Jaraaf	Group stage: 3rd place	(Ivory Coast) ASEC Mimosas	1–0	0–2	
2024–25	ASC Jaraaf	Group stage: 3rd place	(Botswana) Orapa United	1–0	0–0	
2025–26	Génération Foot	First Round	(Ivory Coast) AFAD Djékanou	1–1	3–5	4–6
2026–27	Diambars	First Round	(Tunisia) ES Zarzis	1–0	1–3	2–3

== CAF Cup ==
Season	Club	Round	Opponent	Home	Away
1992	ASEC Ndiambour	First Round	(Sierra Leone) East End Lions	0–0	0–0 (5–4 pen.)
1992	ASEC Ndiambour	Second Round	(Tunisia) CA Bizertin	1–0	4–1
1993	ASC Jeanne d'Arc	First Round	(Algeria) USM el Harrach	0–0	1–6
1996	Entente Ouakam^{7}	First Round	(Tunisia) ES Sahel	1–4	2–1
1997	ASC Linguère	First Round	(Morocco) KAC Marrakech	0–1	1–0
1998	ASC Jeanne d'Arc	First Round	(Algeria) MC Oran	1–0	1–2
1998	ASC Jeanne d'Arc	Second Round	(Gabon) Petrosport FC	2–0	2–0 (a)
1998	ASC Jeanne d'Arc	Quarterfinals	(Morocco) RS Settat	2–0	0–0
1998	ASC Jeanne d'Arc	Semifinals	(Zambia) Nchanga Rangers	0–0	0–0 (3–1 p)
1998	ASC Jeanne d'Arc	Finals	(Tunisia) CS Sfaxien	0–3	0–1
1999	ASC Diaraf	First Round	(Ivory Coast) FC Man	1–0	0–3
1999	ASC Diaraf	Second Round	(Morocco) WAC Casablanca	1–1	2–1
2000	Richard Toll^{5}	First Round	(The Gambia) Real de Banjul	1–0	0–1
2000	Richard Toll^{5}	Second Round	(Tunisia) Étoile du Sahel	0–3	1–2
2001	ASEC Ndiambour	First Round	al-Mahalla SC	0–2	1–1
2001	ASEC Ndiambour	Second Round	(Morocco) Wydad Casablanca	0–2	1–1
2001	ASC Port Autonome	Preliminary Round	(Tunisia) Club Africain	1–1	1–0
2002	ASEC Ndiambour	First Round	(Burkina Faso) ASFA Yennenga	0–0	1–1 (a)
2002	ASEC Ndiambour	Second Round	(Algeria) JS Kabylie	1–1	0–0 (a)
2003	Diourbel^{3}	First Round	(Guinea) AS Kaloum Star	1–1	0–0 (4–2 p.)
2003	Diourbel^{3}	Second Round	(Algeria) JS Kabylie	1–1	0–0 (a)

^{1}US Gorée withdrew primarily due to financial concerns
^{2}The match was finished 2-0 in favour of Djoliba, ASFA refused to play the penalty shootout due to arbitration, they were to be banned from CAF competitions for three years, no ban was put as they participated the following season after winning their second championship title
^{3}Competed as SEIB Diourbel
^{4}Competed as SONACOS
^{5}Competed as CSS Richard-Toll
^{6}Now known as Mbour Petite-Côté
^{7}Competed as Entente Sotrac
