= 1988 WAFU Club Championship =

Tournament details
- Teams: 12 (from 1 confederation)

Final positions
- Champions: (Guinea) ASFAG Conakry (1st title)
- Runners-up: (Nigeria) New Nigerian Bank FC

Tournament statistics
- Matches played: 22
- Goals scored: 37 (1.68 per match)

The 1988 WAFU Club Championship was the twelfth football club tournament season that took place for the runners-up of each West African country's domestic league, the West African Club Championship. It was won by ASFAG Conakry after defeating New Nigerian Bank FC under the away goals rule. A total of 37 goals were scored, fewer than last season. Originally a 28 match season, no Nigerien (also as Nigerite or Niameyan) and Gambian clubs took part. New Nigerian Bank started their first match at the quarterfinals, Okwahu United directly headed to the semis. Asses FC withdrew from the competition.

== Preliminary round ==
The matches took place on June 5 and 19

Team 1	Agg.	Team 2	1st leg	2nd leg
Cornerstones (Ghana)	2–0	(Liberia) Mighty Barrolle	2–0	0–0
Entente II Lomé (w/o) (Togo)	0–1	(Ghana) Okwahu United	0–1	— (Note: Entente II of Lome declared the match forfeit, there was no second match)
Imraguens de Nouadhibou (Mauritania)	2 (a) (Note: For an undetermined reason)–2	(Mali) AS Real Bamako	1–0	2–1
ASFAG Conakry (Guinea)	4–1	(Senegal) ASC Linguère	4–1	0–0
ASEC Abidjan (Ivory Coast)	—	(Benin) Asses FC (w/o)	—	—
Regent Olympic (Sierra Leone)	—	(The Gambia) (w/o)	—	—

== Quarterfinals ==
The matches took place on July 3 and 17

Team 1	Agg.	Team 2	1st leg	2nd leg
Regent Olympic (Sierra Leone)	1–2	(Mali) AS Real Bamako	0–0	2–1
ASFAG Conakry (Guinea)	2–1	(Ghana) Cornerstone	2–0	1–0
New Nigerian Bank FC (Nigeria)	2–2 (4–3 p)	(Ivory Coast) ASEC Abidjan	1–1	1–1

== Semifinals ==
The matches took place on August 14 and 28

Team 1	Agg.	Team 2	1st leg	2nd leg
AS Real Bamako (Mali)	2–4	(Nigeria) New Nigerian Bank FC	1–1	3–1
ASFAG Conakry (Guinea)	2–1	(Ghana) Okwahu United	2–1	0–0

== Finals ==
The matches took place on November 12 and 26.

Team 1	Agg.	Team 2	1st leg	2nd leg
New Nigerian Bank FC (Nigeria)	2–2 (a)	(Guinea) ASFAG Conakry	2–1	1–0

== Winners ==
1988 WAFU Club Championship
(Guinea)
ASFAG Conakry
First title

== See also ==
- 1988 African Cup of Champions Clubs
- 1988 CAF Cup Winners' Cup
