= 1993 CAF Cup final =

1993 Abiola Cup final
- Event: 1993 CAF Cup
Stella Adjamé	Simba Sports Club
(Ivory Coast)	(Tanzania)
2	0

First leg
Stella Adjamé	Simba Sports Club
0	0
- Date: 14 November 1993
- Venue: Stade Robert Champroux, Abidjan
- Referee: Ogbassemi
- Attendance: ≈ 10.000

Second leg
Simba Sports Club	Stella Adjamé
0	2
- Date: 27 November 1993
- Venue: Uhuru Stadium, Ibadan
- Attendance: ≈ 26.000

The 1993 CAF Cup final was the second final of the CAF Cup, a two-legged football matchup to determine the ensuing winner of the Moshood Abiola trophy. The teams set at odds in the final were Stella Adjamé of Abidjan from Ivory Coast against Simba Sports Club from Tanzania. The first leg took place in Abidjan, Ivory Coast on 14 November at Robert Champroux Stadium, while the second leg was held in Dar es Salaam, Tanzania on 27 November at Uhuru Stadium.

Stella Adjamé triumphed with a 2–0 aggregate score, securing their most significant continental trophy since their victory in the 1981 West African Club Championship.

== Route to the final ==
Stella Adjamé				Round	Simba Sports Club			
Opponent	Agg.	1st leg	2nd leg		Opponent	Agg.	1st leg	2nd leg
(Sierra Leone) Kamboi Eagles	w/o			First round	(Mozambique) Ferroviário de Maputo	1–1 (a)	0–0 (H)	1–1 (A)
(Mali) AS Sigui	5–0	0–2 (A)	3–0 (H)	Second round	(Eswatini) Manzini Wanderers	2–0	1–0 (H)	1–0 (A)
(Gabon) Mbilinga FC	3–3 (a)	1–1 (H)	2–2 (A)	Quarter-finals	(Algeria) USM El Harrach	3–2	3–0 (H)	0–2 (A)
(Ethiopia) Insurance FC	3–1	3–0 (H)	0–1 (A)	Semi-finals	(Angola) Aviação	3–1	3–1 (H)	0–0 (A)

== Match details ==
=== First leg ===
1993 CAF Cup Final (Note: The starting lineups for the 1st leg were taken from the magyar press at that time, more precisely from the magazine Focivilág.)
14 November 1993
First leg

Stella Adjamé (Ivory Coast)	0–0	(Tanzania) Simba Sports Club
	Report

Stade Robert Champroux, Abidjan
Attendance: 10.000
Referee: Ogbassemi (Nigeria)

GK	(Ivory Coast) Patrice Tadé Daleba
DF	(Ivory Coast) Jean Soro
DF	(Ivory Coast) K. Nguessan
DF	(Ivory Coast) Ali Gbizié
DF	(Ivory Coast) Nzoue Nguessan
MF	(Ivory Coast) Sakanogo
MF	(Ivory Coast) Siaka Traoré
MF	(Ivory Coast) Celestine Amani
MF	(Ivory Coast) Djedje Amian
FW	(Ivory Coast) Yaya Doumbia
FW	(Ivory Coast) Brandou
Manager:
(Ivory Coast) Basile Wolé

GK	(Tanzania) Mohamed Mwameja
DF	(Tanzania) Twaha Hamidu
DF	(Tanzania) Iddi Selemani
DF	(Tanzania) Rashid Abdallah
DF	(Tanzania) Lenny Ramadhani
MF	(Tanzania) Deo Mkuki
MF	(Tanzania) Feruzi Telu
MF	(Tanzania) George Masatu
MF	(Tanzania) Soma
FW	(Tanzania) Hussein Aman Marshwa
FW	(Tanzania) Thomas Kipese
Manager:
(Tanzania) Abdallah Kibaden

=== Second leg ===
27 November 1993
Second leg

Simba Sports Club (Tanzania)	0–2	(Ivory Coast) Stella Adjamé
	Report	Koume Desire 18'; Jean Zozo 77'

Uhuru Stadium, Dar es Salaam
Attendance: 26.000

GK	(Tanzania)
DF	(Tanzania)
DF	(Tanzania)
DF	(Tanzania) Rashid Abdallah
DF	(Tanzania)
MF	(Tanzania)
MF	(Tanzania)
MF	(Tanzania)
MF	(Tanzania)
FW	(Tanzania)
FW	(Tanzania) Damian Morisho Kimti
Manager:
(Tanzania) Abdallah Kibaden

GK	(Ivory Coast) Patrice Tadé Daleba
DF	(Ivory Coast) Jean Soro
DF	(Ivory Coast)
DF	(Ivory Coast) Nzoue Nguessan
DF	(Ivory Coast)
MF	(Ivory Coast)
MF	(Ivory Coast) Koume Desire
MF	(Ivory Coast) Celestine Amani
MF	(Ivory Coast) Austine Koune
FW	(Ivory Coast) Jean Boli Zozo
FW	(Ivory Coast)
Manager:
(Ivory Coast) Basile Wolé
