= 1987 WAFU Club Championship =

Tournament details
- Teams: 13 (from 1 confederation)

Final positions
- Champions: (Ghana) Cornerstones FC (1st title)
- Runners-up: (Ivory Coast) Stella Club d'Adjamé

Tournament statistics
- Matches played: 22
- Goals scored: 45 (2.05 per match)

The 1987 WAFU Club Championship was the ninth football club tournament season that took place for the runners-up of each West African country's domestic league, the West African Club Championship. It was won again by Africa Sports after defeating Asante Kotoko from Ghana 6-5 in penalty shootouts as both clubs had two goals each in its two matches. A total of 45 goals were scored, a second consecutive one. Originally a 24 match season, as Sport Bissau e Benfica withdrew, Africa Sports automatically qualify in the quarterfinals. Imraguens de Nouadhibou started from the semis and lost to Africa Sports there in two matches.

Not a single club from the Gambia and Niger participated.

== Preliminary round ==
Team 1	Agg.	Team 2	1st leg	2nd leg
Stella Club d'Adjamé (Ivory Coast)	1 (a)–1	(Guinea) ASFAG Conakry	0–0	1–1
Invincible Eleven (Liberia)	4–4 (a)	(Benin) Buffles du Borgou	4–1	3–0
ASC Diaraf (Senegal)	3–3 (0–3 p)	(Nigeria) Iwuanyanwu Nationale	3–0	3–0
Hafia FC (Guinea)	2–1	(Burkina Faso) ASRAN Ouagadougou	1–0	1–1
Kumasi Cornerstone (Ghana)	4–2	(Togo) OC Agaza	3–0	2–1
Djoliba AC (Mali)	2–1	(Sierra Leone) Sierra Fisheries	1–0	1–1
Africa Sports (Ivory Coast)	—	(Guinea-Bissau) Benfica Bissau (w/o)	—	—

== Quarterfinals ==
Team 1	Agg.	Team 2	1st leg	2nd leg
Djoliba AC (Mali)	1–3	(Ivory Coast) Stella Club d'Adjamé	0–2	1–1
Buffles de Borgou (Benin)	0–3	(Ghana) Kumasi Cornerstone	0–0	0–3
Iwuanyanwu Nationale (Nigeria)	1–1 (1–4 p)	(Ivory Coast) Africa Sports	1–0	1–0

== Semifinals ==
Team 1	Agg.	Team 2	1st leg	2nd leg
Africa Sports (Ivory Coast)	0–0 (5–6 p)	(Ghana) Kumasi Cornerstone	0–0	0–0
Stella Club d'Adjamé (Ivory Coast)	4–3	(Mauritania) Imraguens de Nouadhibou	2–2	1–2

== Finals ==
The matches took place on September 27 and October 11

Team 1	Agg.	Team 2	1st leg	2nd leg
Stella Club d'Adjamé (Ivory Coast)	2–2 (2–4 p)	(Ghana) Kumasi Cornerstone	1–1	1–1

== Winners ==
1987 WAFU Club Championship
(Ghana)
Kumasi Cornerstone
First title

== See also ==
- 1987 African Cup of Champions Clubs
- 1987 CAF Cup Winners' Cup
