= 1986 WAFU Club Championship =

Tournament details
- Teams: 12 (from 1 confederation)

Final positions
- Champions: (Ivory Coast) Africa Sports (2nd title)
- Runners-up: (Ghana) Asante Kotoko

Tournament statistics
- Matches played: 18
- Goals scored: 45 (2.5 per match)

The 1986 WAFU Club Championship was the ninth football club tournament season that took place for the runners-up of each West African country's domestic league, the West African Club Championship. It was won again by Africa Sports after defeating Asante Kotoko from Ghana 6–5 in penalty shootouts as both clubs had two goals each in its two matches. A total of 45 goals were scored. Originally a 22 match season, as Sierra Leone's Real Republicans and ASC Police from Nouakchott, Mauritania withdrew, Asante Kotoko and Université du Benin FC (or University of Benin FC) automatically qualify in the quarterfinals.

Not a single club from Mali, Niger and the Gambia participated.

== Preliminary round ==
The matches took place from June 6 to 20. Africa Sports and Stade d'Abidjan directly qualified to the semis.

Team 1	Agg.	Team 2	1st leg	2nd leg
Stade d'Abidjan (Ivory Coast)	5–2	(Liberia) Saint Joseph Warriors	4–0	2–1
SEIB Djourbel (Note: The club is now known as ASC SUNEOR) (Senegal)	3–0	(Guinea-Bissau) SC Bissau	3–0	0–0
Entente II Lomé (Togo)	1–3	(Ivory Coast) Africa Sports	0–1	2–1
Hafia FC (Guinea)	2–1	(Burkina Faso) ASRAN Ouagadougou	1–0	1–1
Asante Kotoko (Ghana)	—	(Sierra Leone) Real Republicans	—	—
University of Benin FC	—	(Mauritania) ASC Police	—	—

== Quarterfinals ==
The matches took place from August 3 to 17.

Team 1	Agg.	Team 2	1st leg	2nd leg
Asante Kotoko (Ghana)	6–1	(Guinea) Hafia FC	4–0	1–2
SEIB Diourbel (Senegal)	4–2	University of Benin FC	3–2	0–1

== Semifinals ==
The matches took place from November 9 and 16.

Team 1	Agg.	Team 2	1st leg	2nd leg
SEIB Diourbel (Senegal)	2–4	(Ghana) Asante Kotoko	2–2	2–0
Africa Sports (Ivory Coast)	3–2	(Ivory Coast) Stade d'Abidjan	2–2	0–1

== Finals ==
The matches took place on December 14 and 28.

Team 1	Agg.	Team 2	1st leg	2nd leg
Africa Sports (Ivory Coast)	2–2 (6–5 p)	(Ghana) Asante Kotoko	2–0	2–0

== Winners ==
1986 WAFU Club Championship
(Ivory Coast)
Africa Sports
Second title

== See also ==
- 1986 African Cup of Champions Clubs
- 1986 CAF Cup Winners' Cup
