= 1989 WAFU Club Championship =

Tournament details
- Teams: 10 (from 1 confederation)

Final positions
- Champions: (Nigeria) Ranchers Bees (1st title)
- Runners-up: (Ivory Coast) ASEC Abidjan

Tournament statistics
- Matches played: 18
- Goals scored: 37 (2.06 per match)

The 1989 WAFU Club Championship was the thirteenth football club tournament season that took place for the runners-up of each West African country's domestic league, the West African Club Championship. It was won by Nigeria's Ranchers Bees after defeating ASEC Abidjan under the away goals rule with a total of 4-3 goals in two matches. A total of 37 goals were scored, second time in a row, fewer than last season. Originally a 28 match season, neither clubs from the Gambia, Guinea-Bissau, Mauritania nor Togo participated. Invincible Eleven directly headed to the semis, later Ranchers Bees directly headed to the finals.

== Preliminary round ==
Team 1	Agg.	Team 2	1st leg	2nd leg
AS Sigui Kayes (Mali)	1–1 (a)	(Nigeria) Ranchers Bees	1–1	0–0
ASFAG Conakry (Guinea)	2–2 (5–3 p)	(Burkina Faso) ASFA Yennenga	1–1	1–1
Invincible Eleven (Liberia)	1 (a)–1	(Guinea) AS Kaloum Star	0–0	1–1
Olympic Niamey (Niger)	0–5	(Ivory Coast) ASEC Abidjan	0–3	2–0
Requins de l'Atlantique	1–2	(Senegal) ASC Port Autonome	0–0	2–1

== Quarterfinals ==
Team 1	Agg.	Team 2	1st leg	2nd leg
ASC Port Autonome (Senegal)	2–3	(Ivory Coast) ASEC Abidjan	1–1	2–1
Ranchers Bees (Nigeria)	3–0	(Guinea) ASFAG Conakry	3–0	0–0

== Semifinals ==
Team 1	Agg.	Team 2	1st leg	2nd leg
Invincible Eleven (Liberia)	3–3 (a)	(Ivory Coast) ASEC Abidjan	3–1	2–0

== Finals ==
Team 1	Agg.	Team 2	1st leg	2nd leg
Ranchers Bees (Nigeria)	4–3	(Ivory Coast) ASEC Abidjan	3–1	2–1

== Winners ==
1989 WAFU Club Championship
(Nigeria)
Ranchers Bees
First title

== See also ==
- 1989 African Cup of Champions Clubs
- 1989 CAF Cup Winners' Cup
