= 1993 WAFU Club Championship =

Tournament details
- Teams: 11 (from 1 confederation)

Final positions
- Champions: (Nigeria) Bendel Insurance (1st title)
- Runners-up: (Guinea) Hafia FC

Tournament statistics
- Matches played: 16
- Goals scored: 37 (2.31 per match)

The 1993 WAFU Club Championship was the 17th football club tournament season that took place for the runners-up or third place of each West African country's domestic league, the West African Club Championship. It was won by Nigeria's Bendel Insurance after defeating Benin's Mogas FC in two legs. A total of about 37 goals were scored, slightly more but not as much as it was in 1991. Originally a 24 match season, it was reduced to a 17 match as neither clubs from the Gambia, Guinea Bissau, Mauritania and Niger participated. Only one club each, Freetown United abandoned after the first leg, later Liberia's Invincible Eleven were disqualified in the quarterfinals. Stade Malien directly played their first match in the semis as no participant were in the first two stages. From the first round, Bendel Insurance directly headed to the semis.

== Preliminary round ==
Team 1	Agg.	Team 2	1st leg	2nd leg
Gomido Kpalimé (Togo)	2 (a)–2	(Mali) AS Mandé	1–0	2–1
USFA (Burkina Faso)	1–3	(Nigeria) Bendel Insurance FC	1–1	2–0
ASC Diaraf (Senegal)	6–2	(Ghana) Neoplan Stars	5–0	2–1
Mogas 90 (Benin)	1–1 (5–3 p)	(Guinea) AS Kaloum Star	1–0	1–0
Invincible Eleven (Liberia)	2–0	(Sierra Leone) Freetown United	2–0	— (Note: Freetown United failed to show up for the second leg)

== Quarterfinals ==
Team 1	Agg.	Team 2	1st leg	2nd leg
ASC Diaraf (Senegal)	2–2 (a)	(Togo) Gomido Kpalimé	1–2	0–1
Invincible Eleven (dq) (Liberia)	—	(Benin) Mogas 90	—	—

== Semifinals ==
Team 1	Agg.	Team 2	1st leg	2nd leg
Stade Malien (Mali)	1–2	(Nigeria) Bendel Insurance FC	1–1	1–0
Gomido Kpalimé (Togo)	3–3 (a)	(Benin) Mogas 90	3–2	1–0

== Finals ==
Team 1	Agg.	Team 2	1st leg	2nd leg
Bendel Insurance FC (Nigeria)	3–1	(Benin) Mogas 90	1–1	0–2

== Winners ==
1993 WAFU Club Championship
(Nigeria)
Bendel Insurance FC
First title

== See also ==
- 1993 African Cup of Champions Clubs
- 1993 CAF Cup Winners' Cup
- 1993 CAF Cup
