= African Cup Winners' Cup =

Football competition merged to CAF Cup in 2004

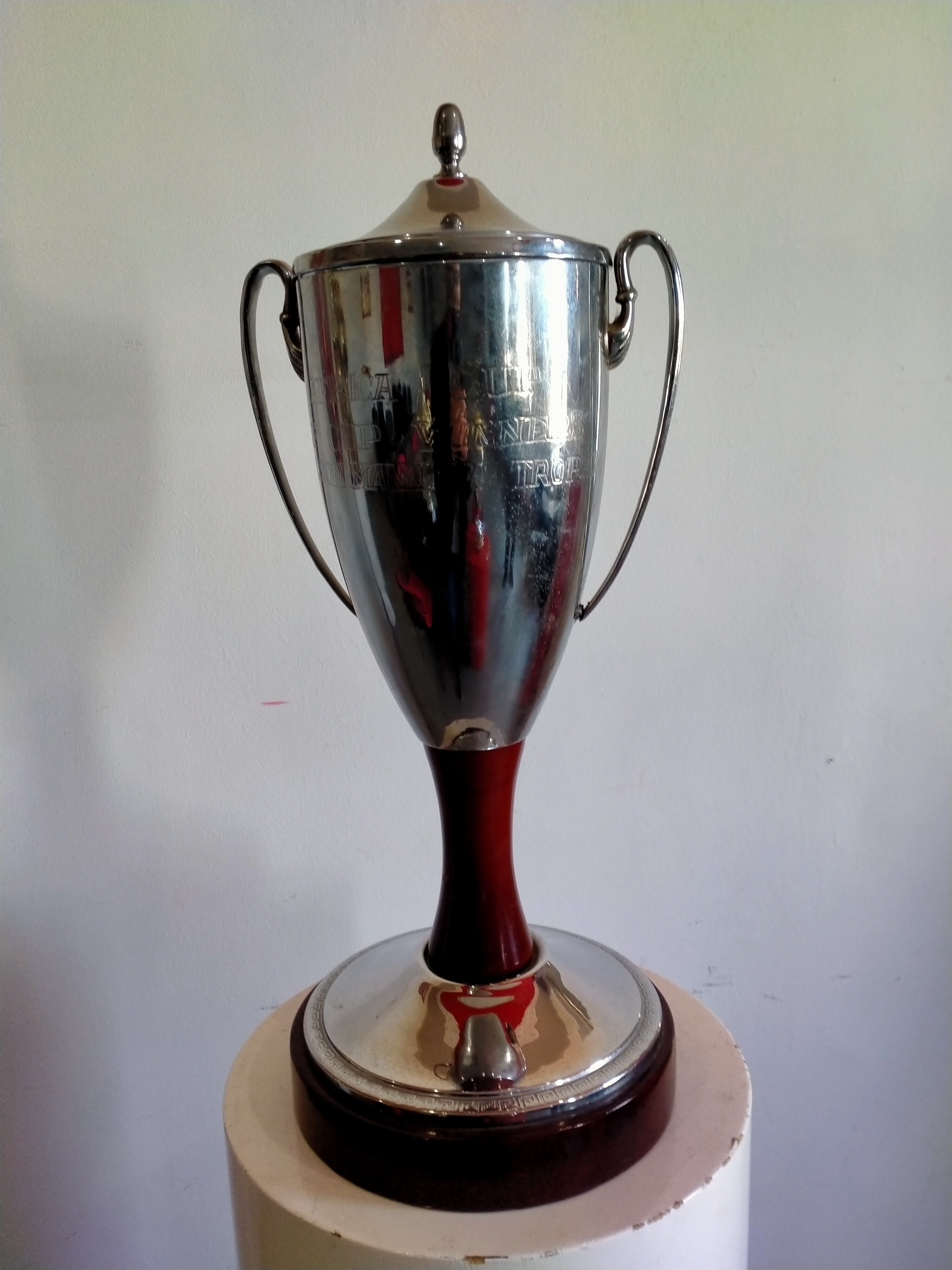
- The African Cup Winners' Cup is on display at the ES Sahel headquarters
- Organiser(s): CAF
- Founded: 1975
- Abolished: 2004
- Region: Africa
- Teams: 32 (first round)
- Last champions: (Tunisia) ES Sahel (2nd title)
- Most championships: (Egypt) Al Ahly (4 titles)
- Website: cafonline.com

The African Cup Winners' Cup was a football competition that started in 1975 and merged with the CAF Cup in 2004 to form the CAF Confederation Cup. It was a competition between the winning clubs of domestic cups in CAF-affiliated nations and was modelled after the UEFA Cup Winners' Cup.

== History ==
The competition was founded at the beginning of 1975 by the Confederation of African Football, following the example of UEFA in Europe, the UEFA Cup Winners' Cup. For the first edition, fifteen teams took part registered and it was the Cameroonian club of Tonnerre Yaoundé who were the first winners, after defeating the Ivorians Stella Club d'Adjamé in the final.

== Records and statistics ==
=== Performance by club ===
Club	Winners	Runners-up	Years won	Years runners-up
(Egypt) Al Ahly	4	0	1984, 1985, 1986, 1993	—
(Egypt) El Mokawloon SC	3	0	1982, 1983, 1996	—
(Ivory Coast) Africa Sports National	2	2	1992, 1999	1980, 1993
(Tunisia) ÉS Sahel	2	0	1997, 2003	—
(Cameroon) Canon Yaoundé	1	3	1979	1977, 1984, 2000
(Cameroon) Tonnerre Yaoundé	1	1	1975	1976
(Kenya) Gor Mahia FC	1	1	1987	1979
(Nigeria) BCC Lions	1	1	1990	1991
(Zambia) Power Dynamos FC	1	1	1991	1982
(Tunisia) ES Tunis	1	1	1998	1987
(Nigeria) Shooting Stars FC	1	0	1976	—
(Nigeria) Enugu Rangers	1	0	1977	—
(Guinea) Horoya AC	1	0	1978	—
(Democratic Republic of the Congo) TP Mazembe	1	0	1980	—
(Cameroon) Union Douala	1	0	1981	—
(Tunisia) CA Bizerte	1	0	1988	—
(Sudan) Al-Merrikh SC	1	0	1989	—
(Democratic Republic of the Congo) DC Motema Pembe	1	0	1994	—
(Algeria) JS Kabylie	1	0	1995	—
(Egypt) Zamalek SC	1	0	2000	—
(South Africa) Kaizer Chiefs FC	1	0	2001	—
(Morocco) Wydad AC Casablanca	1	0	2002	—
(Tunisia) Club Africain	0	2	—	1990, 1999
(Nigeria) Julius Berger FC	0	2	—	1995, 2003
(Ivory Coast) Stella Club d'Adjamé	0	1	—	1975
(Algeria) NA Hussein Dey	0	1	—	1978
(Nigeria) Stationery Stores F.C.	0	1	—	1981
(Togo) OC Agaza	0	1	—	1983
(Nigeria) Leventis United	0	1	—	1985
(Gabon) AS Sogara	0	1	—	1986
(Nigeria) Ranchers Bees FC	0	1	—	1988
(Nigeria) Esan F.C.	0	1	—	1989
(Burundi) Vital'O FC	0	1	—	1992
Kenya Breweries FC	0	1	—	1994
(Democratic Republic of the Congo) AC Sodigraf	0	1	—	1996
(Morocco) FAR Rabat	0	1	—	1997
(Angola) Primeiro de Agosto	0	1	—	1998
(Angola) Interclube	0	1	—	2001
(Ghana) Asante Kotoko SC	0	1	—	2002

=== Performance by country ===
country	Winners	Runners-up	Winning clubs	Runners-up
Egypt	8	0	Al Ahly (4), El Mokawloon SC (3), Zamalek SC (1)	-
Tunisia	4	3	ÉS Sahel (2), CA Bizerte (1), ES Tunis (1)	Club Africain (2), ES Tunis (1)
Nigeria	3	7	Shooting Stars FC (1), Enugu Rangers (1), BCC Lions (1)	Julius Berger FC (2), Stationery Stores F.C.(1), Leventis United (1), Ranchers Bees FC (1), Esan F.C. (1), BCC Lions (1)
Cameroon	3	4	Tonnerre Yaoundé (1), Canon Yaoundé (1), Union Douala (1)	Canon Yaoundé (3), Tonnerre Yaoundé (1)
Ivory Coast	2	3	Africa Sports National (2)	Africa Sports National (2), Stella Club d'Adjamé (1)
Democratic Republic of the Congo	2	1	TP Mazembe (1), DC Motema Pembe(1)	AC Sodigraf (1)
Kenya	1	2	Gor Mahia FC (1)	Gor Mahia FC (1), Kenya Breweries FC (1)
Algeria	1	1	JS Kabylie (1)	NA Hussein Dey (1)
Morocco	1	1	Wydad AC Casablanca (1)	FAR Rabat (1)
Zambia	1	1	Power Dynamos FC (1)	Power Dynamos FC (1)
Guinea	1	0	Horoya AC (1)	-
South Africa	1	0	Kaizer Chiefs FC (1)	-
Sudan	1	0	Al-Merrikh SC (1)	-
Angola	0	2	-	Primeiro de Agosto (1), Interclube (1)
Burundi	0	1	-	Vital'O FC (1)
Gabon	0	1	-	AS Sogara (1)
Ghana	0	1	-	Asante Kotoko SC (1)
Togo	0	1	-	OC Agaza (1)

== Top goalscorers ==
Year	Footballer	Club	Goals
2002	(Ghana) Michael Osei	(Ghana) Asante Kotoko	7
2003	(Nigeria) Ogochukwu Obiakor, (Rwanda) Olivier Karekezi, (Rwanda) Jean Lomami	(Nigeria) Julius Berger (Rwanda) APR	5
