= Real Republicans F.C. =

Real Republicans F.C. is the name of several football clubs:

- Real Republicans F.C. (Ghana)
- Real Republicans F.C. (Sierra Leone)
