= 1994 WAFU Club Championship =

Tournament details
- Teams: 12 (from 1 confederation)

Final positions
- Champions: (Nigeria) Bendel Insurance (2nd title)
- Runners-up: (Nigeria) Plateau United

Tournament statistics
- Matches played: 16
- Goals scored: 46 (2.88 per match)

The 1994 WAFU Club Championship was the 17th football club tournament season that took place for the runners-up or third place of each West African country's domestic league, the West African Club Championship. It was won again by Nigeria's Bendel Insurance after defeating Plateau United in two legs, it was the first final that feature both clubs from a single country. A total of about 46 goals were scored, slightly more but not as much as it was in 1991. No penalty shootout took place that season not even a club advanced under away goals rule. Originally a 22 match season, it was reduced to a 16 match as the Gambia's Real de Banjul FC and Niger's Alkali Nassara withdrew, in the quarterfinals, Liberia's Mighty Barolle withdrew. Neither clubs from Senegal, Guinea-Bissau, Mauritania nor Ghana participated. From the quarterfinals, Bendel Insurance directly headed to the finals.

== Preliminary round ==
Team 1	Agg.	Team 2	1st leg	2nd leg
Ports Authority (Sierra Leone)	5–2	(Guinea) Horoya AC	4–0	2–1
Real de Banjul FC (The Gambia)	(w/o)	(Liberia) Mighty Barrolle	—	—
Alkali Nassara (Niger)	(w/o)	(Nigeria) Plateau United	—	—
Étoile Sportive de Cotonou (Benin)	0–1	(Togo) ASKO Kara	0–0	0–1
AS Bouaké (Ivory Coast)	5–3	(Mali) AS Mandé	3–0	2–2
Big Lions (Ghana)	3-0	(Benin) WAC FC	3-0	0-0

== Quarterfinals ==
Team 1	Agg.	Team 2	1st leg	2nd leg
Bendel Insurance (Nigeria)	6–3	(Sierra Leone) Ports Authority	5–1	1–2
ASKO Kara (Togo)	2–5	(Nigeria) Plateau United	2–3	3–2
ASC Bouaké (Ivory Coast)	—	(Liberia) Mighty Barrolle (w/o)	—	—

== Semifinals ==
Team 1	Agg.	Team 2	1st leg	2nd leg
Plateau United (Nigeria)	3–2	(Ivory Coast) ASC Bouaké	2–1	1–1

== Finals ==
Team 1	Agg.	Team 2	1st leg	2nd leg
Bendel Insurance FC (Nigeria)	2–1	(Nigeria) Plateau United	1–0	1–1

== Winners ==
1994 WAFU Club Championship
(Nigeria)
Bendel Insurance FC
Second title

== See also ==
- 1994 African Cup of Champions Clubs
- 1994 CAF Cup Winners' Cup
- 1994 CAF Cup
