= 1995 WAFU Club Championship =

Tournament details
- Teams: 8 listed (c. 12) (from 1 confederation)

Final positions
- Champions: (Nigeria) Bendel Insurance (3rd title)
- Runners-up: (Nigeria) Plateau United

Tournament statistics
- Matches played: 20
- Goals scored: 35 (1.75 per match)

The 1995 WAFU Club Championship was the 18th football club tournament season that took place for the runners-up or third place of each West African country's domestic league, the West African Club Championship. It was won again by Nigeria's Bendel Insurance after defeating Plateau United in two legs, it was the first final that feature both clubs from a single country. A total of about around 35 goals were scored.

== Preliminary round ==
Some results are unknown

Team 1	Agg.	Team 2	1st leg	2nd leg
Enugu Rangers (Nigeria)	6–1	(Mali) Real Bamako	3–0	1–3
Africa Sports' (Ivory Coast)	2–1	(Ghana) Cape Coast Dwarfs	—	—

== Quarterfinals ==
Team 1	Agg.	Team 2	1st leg	2nd leg
Africa Sports (Ivory Coast)	3–1	(Nigeria) Enugu Rangers	3–1	0–1
Horoya AC (Guinea)	1–5	(Nigeria) Bendel Insurance	0–2	3–0
Mogas 90 FC (Benin)	—	(Liberia) LPRC Oilers (w/o)	—	—

Bendel Insurance directly headed to the finals

== Semifinals ==
Team 1	Agg.	Team 2	1st leg	2nd leg
Africa Sports (Ivory Coast)	3–1	(Benin) Mogas 90 FC	3–1	N/A

== Finals ==
Team 1	Agg.	Team 2	1st leg	2nd leg
Bendel Insurance FC (Nigeria)	5–2	(Ivory Coast) Africa Sports	4–1	1–1

== Winners ==
1995 WAFU Club Championship
(Nigeria)
Bendel Insurance FC
Third title

== See also ==
- 1995 African Cup of Champions Clubs
- 1995 CAF Cup Winners' Cup
- 1995 CAF Cup
