= 1981 WAFU Club Championship =

Tournament details
- Teams: 10 (from 1 confederation)

Final positions
- Champions: (Ivory Coast) Stella Club d'Adjamé (1st title) (1st title)
- Runners-up: (Senegal) AS Police

Tournament statistics
- Matches played: 16
- Goals scored: 34 (2.13 per match)

The 1981 WAFU Club Championship was the fifth football club tournament season that took place for the runners-up of each West African country's domestic league, the West African Club Championship. It was won by Stella Club d'Adjamé in two-legged final victory against AS Police of Dakar, Senegal. Runner-up was AS Police of Senegal. Originally to be an 18 match season, after the forfeiture of Ghana's Eleven Wise, it was reduced to a 16 match season. A total of 34 goals were scored.

== Preliminary round ==
The matches took place from May 31 to June 14.

Team 1	Agg.	Team 2	1st leg	2nd leg
ACS Ksar (Mauritania)	0–5	(Ivory Coast) Stella Club d'Adjamé	0–3	2–0
ASFOSA Lomé (Togo)	1–1 (1–3 p)	(Nigeria) Water Corporation	1–0	1–0
ASC Niayes (Niger)	2–2 (4–2 p)	(Sierra Leone) Real Republicans	2–0	2–0
Eleven Wise (forf.) (Ghana)	—	(Senegal) AS Police	—	—
Saint Joseph Warriors (Liberia)	1–1 (1–3 p)	(Guinea) Kakimbo FC	1–0	1–0

== Intermediary Round ==
The matches took place from August 16 and 20.

Team 1	Agg.	Team 2	1st leg	2nd leg
Water Corporation (Nigeria)	1–1 (7–8 p)	(Senegal) AS Police	1–0	1–0

== Semifinals ==
The matches took place from September 20 to 27

Team 1	Agg.	Team 2	1st leg	2nd leg
Kakimbo FC (Guinea)	4–6	(Ivory Coast) Stella Club d'Adjamé	2–3	3–2
AS Police (Senegal)	1–0	(Niger) ASC Niayes	1–0	0–0

== Finals ==
The matches took place on 4 and 18 October.

Team 1	Agg.	Team 2	1st leg	2nd leg
AS Police (Senegal)	3–5	(Ivory Coast) Stella Club d'Adjamé	3–1	4–0

== Winners ==
1981 WAFU Club Championship
(Ivory Coast)
Stella Club d'Adjamé
First title

== See also ==
- 1981 African Cup of Champions Clubs
- 1981 CAF Cup Winners' Cup
