= 1992 WAFU Club Championship =

Tournament details
- Teams: 13 (from 1 confederation)

Final positions
- Champions: (Mali) Stade Malien (1st title)
- Runners-up: (Guinea) Hafia FC

Tournament statistics
- Matches played: 17
- Goals scored: 33 (1.94 per match)

The 1992 WAFU Club Championship was the 16th football club tournament season that took place for the runners-up or third place of each West African country's domestic league, the West African Club Championship. It was won by Mali's Stade Malien after defeating Guinea's Hafia FC in two legs. A total of about 33 goals were scored, half than last season as three clubs fully forfeited the match and two, Liberté FC Niamey and Jeanne d'Arc of Dakar withdrew after the first leg. ASEC Nouadhbihou (now part of FC Nouadhibou) withdrew in a second match with Lobi Bank, one club Dawu Youngsters of Ghana were disqualified. Neither club from the Gambia nor Guinea-Bissau participated.

== Preliminary round ==
Team 1	Agg.	Team 2	1st leg	2nd leg
ASFAPS (Burkina Faso)	1–2	(Nigeria) Kano Pillars	1–1	2–0
Fulani FC (Liberia)	1–1	(Niger) Liberté FC Niamey	1–1	w/o (Note: Liberté FC of Niamey withdrew after the first leg)
Stade Malien (Mali)	3–2	(Sierra Leone) Old Edwardians FC	3–0	2–0
Dawu Youngsters (dq) (Ghana)	4–1	(Benin) Asemap FC	2–0	2–1
Stade d'Abidjan (w/o) (Ivory Coast)	—	(Senegal) ASC Jeanne d'Arc	—	—

== Quarterfinals ==
Team 1	Agg.	Team 2	1st leg	2nd leg
Kano Pillars (Nigeria)	2–2 (L–W p)	(Guinea) Hafia AC	2–0	2–0
Africa Sports (w/o) (Ivory Coast)	—	(Mali) Stade Malien	—	—
ASC Jeanne d'Arc (Senegal)	0–1	(Liberia) Fulani FC	0–1	— (Note: Jeanne d'Arc of Dakar withdrew)
Asemap FC (Benin)	—	(Mauritania) AS CNSS	—	—

== Semifinals ==
Team 1	Agg.	Team 2	1st leg	2nd leg
Asemap FC (Benin)	1–1 (1–3 p)	(Guinea) Hafia FC	1–0	1–0
Stade Malien (Mali)	5–1	(Liberia) Fulani FC	3–1	0–2

== Finals ==
Team 1	Agg.	Team 2	1st leg	2nd leg
Hafia FC (Guinea)	0–4	(Mali) Stade Malien	0–1	3–0

== Winners ==
1992 WAFU Club Championship
(Mali)
Stade Malien
First title

== See also ==
- 1992 African Cup of Champions Clubs
- 1992 CAF Cup Winners' Cup
- 1992 CAF Cup
