= 1996 WAFU Club Championship =

Tournament details
- Teams: 4 (from 1 confederation)

Final positions
- Champions: (Niger) ASFAN Niamey (1st title)
- Runners-up: (Sierra Leone) East End Lions

Tournament statistics
- Matches played: 20
- Goals scored: 35 (1.75 per match)

The 1996 WAFU Club Championship was the 18th football club tournament season that took place for the runners-up or third place of each West African country's domestic league, the West African Club Championship. It was won again by Niger's military team ASFAN Niamey after defeating East End Lions in the second leg. The club appearance was the lowest in WAFU history which had only four clubs, one each, from Ivory Coast, Niger, Sierra Leone and Senegal. A total of about 16 goals were scored, more than half less than last season. Originally a 22 match season, only six matches were played.

== Semifinals ==
Team 1	Agg.	Team 2	1st leg	2nd leg
Sabé Sports de Bouna (Ivory Coast)	1–2	(Niger) AS FAN	0–0	2–1
East End Lions (Sierra Leone)	3–2	(Senegal) ASEC Ndiambour	2–0	2–1

== Finals ==
Team 1	Agg.	Team 2	1st leg	2nd leg
East End Lions (Sierra Leone)	3–4	(Niger) AS FAN	3–0	4–0

== Winners ==
1996 WAFU Club Championship
(Niger)
AS FAN
First title

== See also ==
- 1996 African Cup of Champions Clubs
- 1996 CAF Cup Winners' Cup
- 1996 CAF Cup
