= 1991 WAFU Club Championship =

Tournament details
- Teams: 13 (from 1 confederation)

Final positions
- Champions: (Ivory Coast) Africa Sports (3rd title)
- Runners-up: (Nigeria) Lobi Bank

Tournament statistics
- Matches played: 23
- Goals scored: 62 (2.7 per match)

The 1991 WAFU Club Championship was the fifteenth football club tournament season that took place for the runners-up or third place of each West African country's domestic league, the West African Club Championship. It was won by Ivory Coast's Africa Sports after defeating Nigeria's Lobi Bank in the away leg 2-1 as the home leg had a goal draw. A total of about 62 goals were scored, making it a record. Africa Sports defeated Buffles du Borgou 0-7 and made the highest scoring match to date, and accounting for around 10% of the total goals scored. Originally a 24 match season, it was reduced to 23 matches as ASEC Nouadhbihou (now part of FC Nouadhibou) withdrew in a second match with Lobi Bank. No club from Gambia or Liberia participated.

== Preliminary round ==
Team 1	Agg.	Team 2	1st leg	2nd leg
ASFAG Conakry (Guinea)	1–1 (a)	(Burkina Faso) RC Kadiogo	1–1	0–0
Buffles du Borgou (Benin)	0–11	(Ivory Coast) Africa Sports	0–7	4–0
AS Real Bamako (Mali)	2–2 (3–4 p)	(Senegal) ETICS Thiès	1–1	1–1
Entente II Lomé (Togo)	3–0	(Niger) Zumunta AC	1–0	0–2
Ranchers Bees (Nigeria)	2–3	(Ghana) Okwahu United	2–1	2–0
ASEC Nouadhibou (Mauritania)	2–3	(Nigeria) Lobi Bank	1–4	— (Note: ASEC Nouadhibou abandoned the second match)

== Quarterfinals ==
Team 1	Agg.	Team 2	1st leg	2nd leg
ASEC Abidjan (Ivory Coast)	2–3	(Ghana) Okwahu United	2–0	3–0
ETICS Thiès (Senegal)	2–2 (3–5 p)	(Ivory Coast) Africa Sports	2–0	2–0
RC Kadiogo (Burkina Faso)	3–4	(Togo) Entente II Lomé	3–2	2–0

== Semifinals ==
Team 1	Agg.	Team 2	1st leg	2nd leg
Africa Sports (Ivory Coast)	4–1	(Ghana) Okwahu United	3–0	1–1
Lobi Bank (Nigeria)	4–2	(Togo) Entente II Lomé	3–0	2–1

== Finals ==
Team 1	Agg.	Team 2	1st leg	2nd leg
Lobi Bank (Nigeria)	2–3	(Ivory Coast) Africa Sports	1–1	2–1

== Winners ==
1991 WAFU Club Championship
(Ivory Coast)
Africa Sports
Third title

== See also ==
- 1991 African Cup of Champions Clubs
- 1991 CAF Cup Winners' Cup
