= 1984 WAFU Club Championship =

Tournament details
- Teams: 14 (from 1 confederation)

Final positions
- Champions: (Nigeria) New Nigerian Bank FC (2nd title)
- Runners-up: (Ghana) Sekondi Hasaacas FC

Tournament statistics
- Matches played: 22
- Goals scored: 64 (2.91 per match)

The 1984 WAFU Club Championship was the seventh football club tournament season that took place for the runners-up of each West African country's domestic league, the West African Club Championship. It was won by New Nigerian Bank in the first of two finals matches against Ghana's Sekondi Hasaacas FC. It featured 12 clubs and 26 matches, four shorter than last season. As Benfica Bissau forfeited, Nigeria's Bendel Insurance headed to the quarterfinals, the match totals shortened to 24. Saint Joseph Warriors of Liberia from the first round headed to the semis, there they lost to Stade Malien from Bamako. A total of 38 goals were scored fewer than last season.

Not a single club from the Gambia took part.

== Preliminary round ==
Its matches took place from 10 to 24 June.

Team 1	Agg.	Team 2	1st leg	2nd leg
Stade d'Abidjan (Ivory Coast)	1–5	(Nigeria) New Nigerian Bank FC	0–0	5–1
Casa Sports (Senegal)	3–3 (4–5 p)	(Ghana) Sekondi Hasaacas FC	2–1	2–1
Jangorzo FC (Niger)	2–1	(Togo) Entente II Lomé	0–0	2–1
ASRAN Ouagadougou (Burkina Faso)	0–1	(Sierra Leone) Sierra Fisheries	0–0	1–0
Buffles de Borgou	3–5	(Mali) Stade Malien	3–2	3–0
Sport Bissau e Benfica (forf.) (Guinea-Bissau)	—–	(Nigeria) Bendel Insurance	—	—
Gangan FC (Guinea)	4–4 (4–5 p)	(Liberia) Saint Joseph Warriors	3–1	3–1

== Intermediary Round ==
Its matches took place on 15 and 29 July.

Team 1	Agg.	Team 2	1st leg	2nd leg
Sekondi Hasaacas FC (Ghana)	1–1 (4–5 p)	(Sierra Leone) Sierra Fisheries	1–0	0–1
New Nigerian Bank FC (Nigeria)	9–3	(Niger) Jangorzo FC	6–1	2–3
Bendel Insurance (Nigeria)	1–2	(Mali) Stade Malien	1–1	1–0
Saint Joseph Warriors (Liberia)	—	exempted	—	—

== Semifinals ==
The matches took place on 19 August and 2 September.

Team 1	Agg.	Team 2	1st leg	2nd leg
Sierra Fisheries (Sierra Leone)	0–3	(Nigeria) New Nigerian Bank FC	0–1	2–0
Stade Malien (Mali)	4–2	(Liberia) Saint Joseph Warriors	3–0	2–1

== Finals ==
The matches took place on 7 October and 10 November.

Team 1	Agg.	Team 2	1st leg	2nd leg
Stade Malien (Mali)	2–4	(Nigeria) New Nigerian Bank FC	2–3	1–0

== Winners ==
1984 WAFU Club Championship
(Nigeria)
New Nigerian Bank FC
Second title

== See also ==
- 1984 African Cup of Champions Clubs
- 1984 CAF Cup Winners' Cup
