= 1998 WAFU Club Championship =

Tournament details
- Teams: 4 (from 1 confederation)

Final positions
- Champions: (Nigeria) Shooting Stars FC (1st title)
- Runners-up: (Niger) JS Ténéré

Tournament statistics
- Matches played: 4

The 1998 WAFU Club Championship was the 29th football club tournament season that took place for the runners-up or third place of each West African country's domestic league, the West African Club Championship. It was won by Nigeria's Shooting Stars after defeating Niger's JS Ténéré 2–0. Only four clubs competed in the edition. All of its four matches were played in Lomé, Togo.

The edition would start at the semis and only have a single match each of the four portions and a third place match would occur in the season.

== Semifinals ==
Team 1	Score	Team 2
JS Ténéré (Niger)	2–0	(Burkina Faso) USFA Ouagadougou
Shooting Stars FC (Nigeria)	3–2	(Ivory Coast) Sabé Sports de Bouna

== 3rd place match ==
Team 1	Score	Team 2
USFA Ouagadougou (Burkina Faso)	2–1	(Ivory Coast) Sabé Sports de Bouna

== Final ==
Team 1	Score	Team 2
Shooting Stars FC (Nigeria)	2–0	(Niger) JS Ténéré

== Winners ==
1998 WAFU Club Championship
(Nigeria)
Shooting Stars FC
First title

== See also ==
- 1998 CAF Champions League
- 1998 CAF Cup Winners' Cup
- 1998 CAF Cup
