= 1988 African Cup Winners' Cup =

Tournament details
- Dates: April - December 1988
- Teams: 36 (from 1 confederation)

Final positions
- Champions: (Tunisia) CA Bizertin (1st title)
- Runners-up: (Nigeria) Ranchers Bees

Tournament statistics
- Matches played: 58
- Goals scored: 131 (2.26 per match)

The 1988 season of the African Cup Winners' Cup football club tournament was won by CA Bizertin in two-legged final victory against Ranchers Bees. This was the fourteenth season that the tournament took place for the winners of each African country's domestic cup. Thirty-six sides entered the competition, with Dragons de l'Ouémé, Hearts of Oak, Al Madina and KAC Marrakech all withdrawing before the 1st leg of the first round.

== Preliminary round ==
Team 1	Agg.	Team 2	1st leg	2nd leg
Matlama FC (Lesotho)	2-5	(Mozambique) Maxaquene	2-1	0-4
Mukura Victory Sports FC (Rwanda)	5-4	(Eswatini) Mbabane Highlanders	5-1	0-3
AS Sigui (Mali)	0-0^{1}	(Sierra Leone) Real Republicans	0-0	0-0
Wallidan F.C. (The Gambia)	w/o^{2}	(Mauritania) AS Amical Douane	3-0^{2}	n/p

- 1: Real Republicans won 4-3 PSO
- 2: First leg abandoned with score at 3-0. Second leg not played.

== First round ==
Team 1	Agg.	Team 2	1st leg	2nd leg
AFC Leopards (Kenya)	5-1	(Zimbabwe) CAPS United	1-1	4-0
ASC Bouaké (Ivory Coast)	w/o^{1}	(Benin) Dragons de l'Ouémé	w/o	w/o
ASFAG (Guinea)	w/o^{2}	(Ghana) Hearts of Oak	w/o	w/o
Atlético Malabo (Equatorial Guinea)	3-6	(Cameroon) Diamant Yaoundé	3-1	0-5
BTM Antananarivo (Madagascar)	3-1	(Tanzania) Miembeni S.C.	3-1	0-0
CA Bizerte (Tunisia)	1-1^{3}	(Algeria) Union d'El Harrach	0-1	1-0
Horseed FC (Somalia)	1-1^{4}	(Sudan) Al-Mourada	0-0	1-1
ASC Jeanne d'Arc (Senegal)	5-1	(Togo) ASKO Kara	3-0	2-1
Kampala City Council FC (Uganda)	0-2	(Zaire) AS Kalamu	0-1	0-1
Maxaquene (Mozambique)	1-4	(Zambia) Power Dynamos	1-3	0-1
USM Libreville (Gabon)	1-1^{5}	(Republic of the Congo) Inter Club	1-1	0-0^{5}
Mukura Victory Sports FC (Rwanda)	0-2	(Kenya) Gor Mahia	0-1	0-1
Muzinga FC (Burundi)	1-2	(Angola) Ferroviário da Huíla	0-1	1-1
Ranchers Bees (Nigeria)	5-2	(Liberia) Mighty Barolle	4-1	1-1
Real Republicans (Sierra Leone)	w/o^{6}	(Libya) Al-Madina	w/o	w/o
Wallidan F.C. (The Gambia)	w/o^{7}	(Morocco) KAC Marrakech	w/o	w/o

- 1: Dragons de l'Ouémé withdrew.
- 2: Hearts of Oak withdrew.
- 3: CA Bizerte won 6-5 on PSO.
- 4: Horseed FC won on away goals.
- 5: Second leg abandoned with score at 0-0. Inter Club won on away goals.
- 6: Al-Medina withdrew.
- 7: KAC Marrakech withdrew.

== Second round ==
Team 1	Agg.	Team 2	1st leg	2nd leg
AFC Leopards (Kenya)	4-3	(Zaire) AS Kalamu	4-1	0-2
Gor Mahia (Kenya)	3-1	(Madagascar) BTM Antananarivo	2-1	1-0
Horseed FC (Somalia)	0-9	(Tunisia) CA Bizerte	0-2	0-7
Inter Club (Republic of the Congo)	2-1	(Ivory Coast) ASC Bouaké	1-0	1-1
ASC Jeanne d'Arc (Senegal)	2-4	(Cameroon) Diamant Yaoundé	1-2	1-2
Power Dynamos (Zambia)	3-5	(Angola) Ferroviário da Huíla	1-0	2-5
Ranchers Bees (Nigeria)	2-1	(Guinea) ASFAG	1-0	1-1
Real Republicans (Sierra Leone)	0-1	(The Gambia) Wallidan F.C.	0-0	0-1

== Quarter finals ==
Team 1	Agg.	Team 2	1st leg	2nd leg
AFC Leopards (Kenya)	1-1^{1}	(Cameroon) Diamant Yaoundé	1-0	0-1
CA Bizerte (Tunisia)	w/o^{2}	(The Gambia) Wallidan F.C.	w/o	w/o
Ferroviário da Huíla (Angola)	3-5	(Nigeria) Ranchers Bees	1-1	2-4
Gor Mahia (Kenya)	3-5	(Republic of the Congo) Inter Club	2-1	1-4

- 1: Diamant Yaoundé won 5-3 on PSO.
- 2: Wallidan withdrew.

== Semi finals ==
Team 1	Agg.	Team 2	1st leg	2nd leg
Diamant Yaoundé (Cameroon)	1-3	(Tunisia) CA Bizerte	1-0	0-3
Inter Club (Republic of the Congo)	1-2	(Nigeria) Ranchers Bees	1-0	0-2

== Final ==
Team 1	Agg.	Team 2	1st leg	2nd leg
Ranchers Bees (Nigeria)	0-1	(Tunisia) CA Bizerte	0-0	0-1

African Cup Winners' Cup Winners
(Tunisia)
CA Bizerte
First title
