= 1999 African Cup Winners' Cup =

Tournament details
- Dates: 31 January - 4 December 1999
- Teams: 38 (from 1 confederation)

Final positions
- Champions: (Ivory Coast) Africa Sports (2nd title)
- Runners-up: (Tunisia) Club Africain

Tournament statistics
- Matches played: 70
- Goals scored: 191 (2.73 per match)

The 1999 African Cup Winners' Cup was the twenty-fifth season of Africa's second oldest club football tournament organised by CAF.

Ivorian club Africa Sports appeared in and won their second African Cup Winners' Cup title after defeating former African champions Club Africain of Tunisia 2–1 over the two-legged final.

== Association team allocation ==
A total of 38 teams from 38 CAF associations qualified for the tournament after winning their respective premier domestic cups. Of the 38 teams that qualified for the tournament 2 did not participate in it;

- Ethiopian club Coffee FC, who were set to appear in the first round, withdrew before their first leg tie with AS Inter Star.
- Burundian club AS Inter Star, who had received a bye into the second round following the withdrawal of Coffee FC, would themselves withdraw before their first leg tie with Power Dynamos.

== Format ==
The tournament consisted of five rounds preceding a two-legged final.

- Preliminary round - The 12 lowest ranked teams - whose rankings were determined by their association's performances at previous CAF club tournaments - were drawn against each other in 6 matches consisting of two-legs each.
- First round - The 6 winners from the preliminary round were then drawn against the remaining 26 clubs, resulting in 16 matches consisting of two-legs each.
- Second round - The 16 winners from the first round were then drawn against each other, resulting in 8 matches consisting of two-legs each.
- Quarter-finals - The 8 winners from the second round were then drawn against each other, resulting in 4 matches consisting of two-legs each.
- Semi-finals - The 4 victorious quarter-finalists were then drawn against each other in 2 semi-finals consisting of two-legs each.
- Final - The victorious semi-finalists contested a two-legged final to determine the champion.

The away goals rule was used to determine the victors in the event of a match being tied over the two-legs. If it was not possible to determine a winner using the away goals rule, the tie went to a penalty shootout to determine the winner.

== Preliminary round ==
The first legs were played on 30 & 31 January, and the second legs were played on 14 February 1999.

=== Matches ===
Team 1	Agg.	Team 2	1st leg	2nd leg
Anges de Fatima (Central African Republic)	9-2	(Equatorial Guinea) Union Vesper	6-0	3-2
Mogas 90 FC (Benin)	0-1	(Liberia) LPRC Oilers	0-0	0-1
Bata Bullets (Malawi)	4-3	(Eritrea) Hintsa	4-2	0-1
FC Djivan (Madagascar)	1-3	(Botswana) Defence Force XI	0-0	1-3
AS Marsouins (Réunion)	6-3	(Lesotho) Arsenal	5-0	1-3
Fire Brigade SC (Mauritius)	4-4(2-3 pen)	(Seychelles) St Michel United	2-2	2-2

== First round ==
The first legs were played from 12 to 14 March, and the second legs were played from 26 to 28 March 1999.

=== Matches ===
Team 1	Agg.	Team 2	1st leg	2nd leg
WA Tlemcen (Algeria)	2-4	(Libya) Al-Shat	1-2	1-2
AS Mineurs (Guinea)	1-1(4-3 pen)	(Liberia) LPRC Oilers	1-0	0-1
FAR Rabat (Morocco)	2-1	(Senegal) ASC Yeggo	2-0	0-1
Wikki Tourists (Nigeria)	4-1	(Chad) Renaissance FC	4-0	0-1
Africa Sports (Ivory Coast)	3-1	(Mali) Stade Malien	2-0	1-1
Simba FC (Uganda)	3-2	Tanzania Stars	2-1	1-1
Dynamo Douala (Cameroon)	3-1	(Central African Republic) Anges de Fatima	3-0	0-1
Club Africain (Tunisia)	4-0	(Burkina Faso) ASFB	3-0	1-0
Power Dynamos (Zambia)	7-3	(Seychelles) St Michel United	6-1	1-2
Coffee FC (Ethiopia)	w/o^{[1]}	(Burundi) AS Inter Star	-	-
Mathare United' (Kenya)	4-3	(Malawi) Bata Bullets	2-0	2-3
Petro Atlético (Angola)	3-4	(Democratic Republic of the Congo) AS Dragons	2-0	1-4
Maxaquene (Mozambique)	3-3(6-5 pen)	(Réunion) AS Marsouins	2-1	1-2
Orlando Pirates (South Africa)	9-1	(Botswana) Defence Force XI	6-0	3-1
Al-Masry (Egypt)	1-1(4-3 pen)	(Sudan) Al-Merreikh	1-0	0-1
Asante Kotoko (Ghana)	3-2	(Gabon) Ndzimba	2-0	1-2

Notes:

^{^[1]} Coffee FC withdrew before their first leg tie against AS Inter Star, handing AS Inter Star a walkover into the second round.

== Second round ==
The first legs were played between from 30 April-2 May, and the second legs were played from 14 to 16 May 1999.

=== Matches ===
Team 1	Agg.	Team 2	1st leg	2nd leg
AS Mineurs (Guinea)	6-0	(Libya) Al-Shat	3-0	3-0
Wikki Tourists (Nigeria)	0-3	(Morocco) FAR Rabat	0-1	0-2
Simba FC (Uganda)	0-3	(Ivory Coast) Africa Sports	0-1	0-2
Club Africain (Tunisia)	6-1	(Cameroon) Dynamo Douala	4-0	2-1
AS Inter Star (Burundi)	w/o^{[1]}	(Zambia) Power Dynamos	-	-
AS Dragons (Democratic Republic of the Congo)	4-2	(Kenya) Mathare United	3-1	1-1
Orlando Pirates (South Africa)	7-5	(Mozambique) Maxaquene	3-1	4-4
Asante Kotoko (Ghana)	1-1(2-4 pen)	(Egypt) Al-Masry	1-0	0-1

Notes:

^{^[1]} AS Inter Star withdrew before their first leg tie against Power Dynamos, handing Power Dynamos a walkover into the second round.

== Quarter-finals ==
The first legs were played on 4 & 5 September, and the second legs were played from 19 to 26 September 1999.

=== Matches ===
Team 1	Agg.	Team 2	1st leg	2nd leg
Power Dynamos (Zambia)	2-3	(Tunisia) Club Africain	1-1	1-2
AS Dragons (Democratic Republic of the Congo)	1-3	(Egypt) Al-Masry	1-0	0-3
Orlando Pirates (South Africa)	4-1	(Guinea) AS Mineurs	1-0	3-1
FAR Rabat (Morocco)	1-2	(Ivory Coast) Africa Sports	1-1	0-1

== Semi-finals ==
The first legs were played on 10 October, and the second legs were played on 23 & 24 October 1999.

=== Matches ===
Team 1	Agg.	Team 2	1st leg	2nd leg
Club Africain (Tunisia)	4-0	(Egypt) Al-Masry	0-0	4-0
Africa Sports (Ivory Coast)	4-4(3-0 pen)	(South Africa) Orlando Pirates	3-1	1-3

== Final ==
Team 1	Agg.	Team 2	1st leg	2nd leg
Africa Sports (Ivory Coast)	2–1	(Tunisia) Club Africain	1–0	1–1

=== First leg ===
21 November 1999

Africa Sports (Ivory Coast)	1 – 0	(Tunisia) Club Africain
F. Keïta 30'

Stade Robert Champroux, Abidjan

=== Second leg ===
4 December 1999

Club Africain (Tunisia)	1 – 1	(Ivory Coast) Africa Sports
Amrouche 33'		A. Keïta 32'

Stade El Menzah, Tunis
Attendance: 45,000
Referee: Falla N'Doye (Senegal)

Africa Sports won the two-legged final 2–1 on aggregate.
