= West African Club Championship =

- Founded: 1977
- Abolished: 2017
- Region: Africa (CAF)
- Teams: 13–16
- Last champions: AS Tanda (2017)
- Most championships: Africa Sports, Bendel Insurance (3 titles)
- 2017 WAFU Club Championship

The West African Club Championship (UFOA Cup), also known as the General Eyadéma Cup, was a football tournament for West African clubs from 1977 to 1999. It was open to league runners-up in the West Africa (or Zone 3) region of the CAF. While the first matches were played of the 2000 tournament, the competition was cancelled before the final, largely for financial reasons. While the intention of the CAF was to revive a national squad tournament in its place, the planned annual CSSA Nations Cup has not been regularly scheduled since. The tournament was resurrected in 2009 to pit each member country's highest team not featuring in the CAF Champions League or the CAF Confederation Cup. The final four was played in December with Togo as the host.

== Winners by year ==
- 1977 Stade Abidjan, Côte d'Ivoire
- 1978 ASFA Dakar, Senegal
- 1979 ASF Police, Senegal
- 1980 ASF Police, Senegal
- 1981 Stella Abidjan, Côte d'Ivoire
- 1982 Sekondi Hasaacas F.C., Ghana
- 1983 New Nigeria Bank (NNB), Benin City, Nigeria
- 1984 New Nigeria Bank (NNB), Benin City, Nigeria
- 1985 Africa Sports, Côte d'Ivoire
- 1986 Africa Sports, Côte d'Ivoire
- 1987 Cornerstones F.C., Kumasi, Ghana
- 1988 ASFAG, Conakry, Guinea
- 1989 Ranchers Bees, Nigeria
- 1990 ASEC Abidjan, Côte d'Ivoire
- 1991 Africa Sports, Côte d'Ivoire
- 1992 Stade Malien, Mali
- 1993 Bendel Insurance, Nigeria
- 1994 Bendel Insurance, Nigeria
- 1995 Bendel Insurance, Nigeria
- 1996 ASFAN, Niamey, Niger
- 1997 Ghapoha, Tema, Ghana
- 1998 Shooting Stars F.C., Nigeria
- 1999 ASFA Yennega, Burkina Faso
- 2009 Horoya AC, Guinea
- 2010 Sharks F.C., Nigeria
- 2011 Dynamic Togolais, Togo
- 2017 AS Tanda, Côte d'Ivoire
