= 1993 African Cup Winners' Cup =

Tournament details
- Dates: February - 3 December 1993
- Teams: 41 (from 1 confederation)

Final positions
- Champions: (Egypt) Al Ahly (4th title)
- Runners-up: (Ivory Coast) Africa Sports

Tournament statistics
- Matches played: 72
- Goals scored: 183 (2.54 per match)

The 1993 African Cup Winners' Cup football club tournament was won by Al Ahly in two-legged final victory against Africa Sports. This was the nineteenth season that the tournament took place for the winners of each African country's domestic cup. Forty-one sides entered the competition, with Benfica and Diamond Stars withdrawing before the 1st leg of the preliminary round while NPA Anchors, Liverpool and Kabwe Warriors all disqualified by CAF during the first round.

== Preliminary round ==
Team 1	Agg.	Team 2	1st leg	2nd leg
Gazelle (Chad)	2–3	(Equatorial Guinea) Elá Nguema	1–1	1–2
Hafia FC (Guinea)	2–1	(Mali) Stade Malien	2–0	0–1
Jomo Cosmos (South Africa)	7–0	(Eswatini) Denver Sundowns	1–0	6–0
Liverpool (Namibia)	2–1	(Botswana) TAFIC	1–1	1–0
Pamba SC (Tanzania)	2–2 (a)	(Rwanda) Mukura Victory	0–1	2–1
ASC SNIM (Mauritania)	w/o	(Guinea-Bissau) Benfica Bissau	n/a	n/a
Semassi (Togo)	w/o	(Sierra Leone) Diamond Stars	n/a	n/a
Silver Strikers (Malawi)	1–4	(Lesotho) Arsenal	0–2	1–2
AS Tempête Mocaf (Central African Republic)	2–3	(Angola) Petro Atlético	1–2	1–1

== First round ==
Team 1	Agg.	Team 2	1st leg	2nd leg
Africa Sports (Ivory Coast)	w/o	(Liberia) NPA Anchors	n/a	n/a
Al-Ahly (Egypt)	5–0	(Tanzania) Pamba SC	5–0	0–0
Al-Merrikh (Sudan)	3–2	(Uganda) Express FC	3–0	0–2
CARA Brazzaville (Republic of the Congo)	2–3	(Angola) Petro Atlético	1–0	1–3
COSFAP Antananarivo (Madagascar)	2–5	(South Africa) Jomo Cosmos	0–2	2–3
Clube de Gaza (Mozambique)	3–3 (a)	(Lesotho) Arsenal	2–2	1–1
DC Motema Pembe (Zaire)	w/o	(Namibia) Liverpool	6–1	n/a
Delta (Gabon)	1–2	(Togo) Semassi	1–0	0–2
Dragons de l'Ouémé (Benin)	6–2	(Niger) Olympic Niamey	4–0	2–2
El-Kanemi Warriors (Nigeria)	4–0	(Equatorial Guinea) Elá Nguema	4–0	0–0
JS Kabylie (Algeria)	11–2	(Mauritania) ASC SNIM	8–1	3–1
Kabwe Warriors (Zambia)	w/o	(Burundi) Prince Louis	2–1	abd
Olympic Mvolyé (Cameroon)	2–1	(Burkina Faso) Rail Club Kadiogo	1–0	1–1
Stade Tunisien (Tunisia)	1–0	(Guinea) Hafia FC	1–0	0–0
Voradep (Ghana)	0–1	(Senegal) US Gorée	0–0	0–1
Wankie FC (Zimbabwe)	1–3	Kenya Breweries	0–2	1–1

== Second round ==
Team 1	Agg.	Team 2	1st leg	2nd leg
Africa Sports (Ivory Coast)	7–0	(Togo) Semassi	4–0	3–0
Arsenal (Lesotho)	0–2	(Egypt) Al-Ahly	0–1	0–1
Kenya Breweries	1–2	(Sudan) Al-Merrikh	1–1	0–1
DC Motema Pembe (Zaire)	2–2 (a)	(Angola) Petro Atlético	0–0	2–2
El-Kanemi Warriors (Nigeria)	4–3	(Cameroon) Olympic Mvolyé	4–0	0–3
JS Kabylie (Algeria)	4–3	(Benin) Dragons de l'Ouémé	4–0	0–3
Prince Louis (Burundi)	3–7	(South Africa) Jomo Cosmos	3–3	0–4
Stade Tunisien (Tunisia)	2–1	(Senegal) US Gorée	2–0	0–1

== Quarter-finals ==
Team 1	Agg.	Team 2	1st leg	2nd leg
Africa Sports (Ivory Coast)	4–1	(Algeria) JS Kabylie	4–0	0–1
Al-Merrikh (Sudan)	2–7	(Egypt) Al-Ahly	1–2	1–5
DC Motema Pembe (Zaire)	2–2 (a)	(South Africa) Jomo Cosmos	2–1	0–1
El-Kanemi Warriors (Nigeria)	2–1	(Tunisia) Stade Tunisien	1–0	1–1

== Semi-finals ==
Team 1	Agg.	Team 2	1st leg	2nd leg
Jomo Cosmos (South Africa)	1–5	(Ivory Coast) Africa Sports	1–1	0–4
Al-Ahly (Egypt)	3–0	(Nigeria) El-Kanemi Warriors	3–0	0–0

== Final ==
Team 1	Agg.	Team 2	1st leg	2nd leg
Africa Sports (Ivory Coast)	1–2	(Egypt) Al-Ahly	1–1	0–1

African Cup Winners' Cup Winners
(Egypt)
Al Ahly
Fourth title
