= 1992 African Cup Winners' Cup =

Tournament details
- Dates: February - 6 December 1992
- Teams: 38 (from 1 confederation)

Final positions
- Champions: (Ivory Coast) Africa Sports (1st title)
- Runners-up: (Burundi) Vital'O FC

Tournament statistics
- Matches played: 68
- Goals scored: 164 (2.41 per match)

The 1992 African Cup Winners' Cup football club tournament was won by Africa Sports in two-legged final victory against Vital'O FC. This was the eighteenth season that the tournament took place for the winners of each African country's domestic cup. Thirty-eight sides entered the competition, with Chief Santos withdrawing before the 1st leg of the preliminary round and Highlanders F.C. withdrawing before the 1st leg of the first round.

== Preliminary round ==
Team 1	Agg.	Team 2	1st leg	2nd leg
ASDR Fatima (Central African Republic)	4–1	(Equatorial Guinea) Atlético Malabo	3–0	1–1
Chief Santos (Namibia)	w/o	(Botswana) Centre Chiefs	—	—
Denver Sundowns (Eswatini)	6–4	(Mozambique) Clube de Gaza	5–3	1–1
Mogas 90 FC (Benin)	3–2	(Chad) Postel 2000	3–0	0–2
Ports Authority FC (Sierra Leone)	3–1	(Mauritania) AS Amical Douane	3–0	0–1
Railways SC (Tanzania)	1–1 (3–2 p)	(Lesotho) Matlama FC	1–0	0–1

== First round ==
Team 1	Agg.	Team 2	1st leg	2nd leg
AFC Leopards (Kenya)	2–3	(Egypt) Al Ahly	2–1	0–2
AS Mandé (Mali)	2–5	(Algeria) USM Bel Abbès	2–0	0–5
ASDR Fatima (Central African Republic)	1–0	(Cameroon) Tonnerre Yaoundé	1–0	0–0
Al-Merrikh (Sudan)	2–1	(Uganda) Express FC	1–0	1–1
Centre Chiefs (Botswana)	0–6	(Zambia) Power Dynamos	0–2	0–4
Denver Sundowns (Eswatini)	2–6	(Zambia) Kabwe Warriors	1–3	1–3
ASC Diaraf (Senegal)	2–3	(Guinea) ASFAG	0–1	2–2
Elecsport (Republic of the Congo)	2–1	(Nigeria) El-Kanemi Warriors	2–0	0–1
Invincible Eleven (Liberia)	1–2	(Ghana) Great Olympics	0–2	1–0
Mogas 90 FC (Benin)	1–1 (a)	(Tunisia) ES Sahel	0–0	1–1
Olympic FC (Niger)	1–0	(Libya) Al-Ahly	1–0	0–0
Petro Atlético (Angola)	1–1 (3–4 p)	(Zaire) DC Motema Pembe	1–0	0–1
Ports Authority FC (Sierra Leone)	2–6	(Ivory Coast) Africa Sports	2–2	0–4
Railways SC (Tanzania)	w/o	(Zimbabwe) Highlanders FC	—	—
US Mbila Nzambi (Gabon)	2–0	(Burkina Faso) ASFA Yennenga	2–0	0–0
Vital'O FC (Burundi)	2–2 (4–3 p)	(Madagascar) BTM Antananarivo	2–0	0–2

== Second round ==
Team 1	Agg.	Team 2	1st leg	2nd leg
Africa Sports (Ivory Coast)	6–2	(Algeria) USM Bel Abbès	5–1	1–1
DC Motema Pembe (Zaire)	4–3	(Ghana) Great Olympics	4–2	0–1
Elecsport (Republic of the Congo)	2–4	(Central African Republic) ASDR Fatima	1–0	1–4
Kabwe Warriors (Zambia)	1–1 (3–4 p)	(Egypt) Al Ahly	1–0	0–1
Mogas 90 FC (Benin)	3–2	(Guinea) ASFAG	3–1	0–1
Olympic FC (Niger)	3–3 (a)	(Gabon) US Mbila Nzambi	3–2	0–1
Railways SC (Tanzania)	3–4	(Sudan) Al-Merrikh	2–1	1–3
Vital'O FC (Burundi)	w/o	(Zambia) Power Dynamos	—	—

== Quarter-finals ==
Team 1	Agg.	Team 2	1st leg	2nd leg
ASDR Fatima (Central African Republic)	1–2	(Burundi) Vital'O FC	0–0	1–2
Al-Merrikh (Sudan)	4–2	(Gabon) US Mbila Nzambi	3–0	1–2
Mogas 90 FC (Benin)	0–2	(Zaire) DC Motema Pembe	0–0	0–2
Al Ahly (Egypt)	2–3	(Ivory Coast) Africa Sports	2–0	0–3

== Semi-finals ==
Team 1	Agg.	Team 2	1st leg	2nd leg
Africa Sports (Ivory Coast)	5–3	(Zaire) DC Motema Pembe	4–2	1–1
Al-Merrikh (Sudan)	3–4	(Burundi) Vital'O FC	1–0	2–4

== Final ==
Team 1	Agg.	Team 2	1st leg	2nd leg
Vital'O FC (Burundi)	1–5	(Ivory Coast) Africa Sports	1–1	0–4

== Champions ==
1992 African Cup Winners' Cup Winners
(Ivory Coast)
Africa Sports
First title
