= 1993 CAF Cup =

Tournament details
- Dates: ? - 27 November 1993
- Teams: 30 (from 1 confederation)

Final positions
- Champions: (Ivory Coast) Stella Adjamé (1st title)
- Runners-up: {} Simba S.C.

Tournament statistics
- Matches played: 64
- Goals scored: 138 (2.16 per match)

The 1993 CAF Cup was the second football club tournament season that took place for the teams that missed a chance in the Champions league and CAF Cup winners of each African country's domestic league. It was won by Stella Adjamé in two-legged final victory against Simba Sports Club of Tanzania.

== Preliminary round ==
Team 1	Agg.	Team 2	1st leg	2nd leg
Entente II (Togo)	w/o	(Guinea-Bissau) UDI Bissau	—	—
Insurance FC (Ethiopia)	3–2	(Rwanda) Rayon Sports	2–1	1–1
Linare FC (Lesotho)	3–5	(Namibia) Young Ones FC	1–1	2–4
Tourbillon FC (Chad)	4–3	(Central African Republic) Anges de Fatima	1–1	3–2
CD Travadores (Cape Verde)	0–0 (5–6 p)	(Mauritania) ASC Air Mauritanie	0–0	0–0

== First round ==
Team 1	Agg.	Team 2	1st leg	2nd leg
ASC Air Mauritanie (Mauritania)	3–2	(Guinea) ASFAG	0–1	3–1
Coffee United (Uganda)	1–1 (3–5 p)	(Kenya) Gor Mahia	0–1	1–0
Entente II (Togo)	2–5	(Gabon) Mbilinga FC	0–3	2–2
FC Scibe (Zaire)	0–2	(Angola) ASA	0–0	0–2
Insurance FC (Ethiopia)	1–1 (a)	(Sudan) Al-Merrikh SC (Al-Obeid)	0–0	1–1
ASC Jeanne d'Arc (Senegal)	1–6	(Algeria) USM El Harrach	0–0	1–6
MDC United (Malawi)	1–7	(South Africa) Hellenic FC	1–1	0–6
Manzini Wanderers (Eswatini)	w/o	(Zimbabwe) CAPS United	—	—
FDA Foresters (Liberia)	1–7	(Ghana) Hearts of Oak	0–2	1–5
Petrosport Brazzaville (Republic of the Congo)	3–1	(Benin) Requins de l'Atlantique	3–0	0–1
Shooting Stars (Nigeria)	2–2 (a)	(Mali) AS Sigui	2–1	0–1
Simba Sports Club (Tanzania)	1–1 (a)	(Mozambique) Ferroviário de Maputo	0–0	1–1
Stella Adjamé (Ivory Coast)	w/o	(Sierra Leone) Kamboi Eagles	—	—
Tourbillon FC (Chad)	0–3	(Cameroon) Canon Yaoundé	0–0	0–3
Young Ones FC (Namibia)	w/o	(Tanzania) Simba Sports Club	—	—
Zumunta AC (Niger)	3–1	(Burkina Faso) ASFA Yennenga	1–1	2–0

== Second round ==
Team 1	Agg.	Team 2	1st leg	2nd leg
ASA (Angola)	2–0	(Cameroon) Canon Yaoundé	0–0	2–0
Hearts of Oak (Ghana)	5–5 (5–6 p)	(Algeria) USM El Harrach	3–2	2–3
Hellenic FC (South Africa)	3–3 (a)	(Kenya) Gor Mahia	3–1	0–2
Mbilinga FC (Gabon)	5–0	(Republic of the Congo) Petrosport Brazzaville	3–0	2–0
AS Sigui (Mali)	0–5	(Ivory Coast) Stella Adjamé	0–2	0–3
Tanzania Simba Sports Club	2–0	(Eswatini) Manzini Wanderers	1–0	1–0
Young Ones FC (Namibia)	2–8	(Ethiopia) Insurance FC	2–1	0–7
Zumunta AC (Niger)	4–1	(Mauritania) ASC Air Mauritanie	2–0	2–1

== Quarter-finals ==
Team 1	Agg.	Team 2	1st leg	2nd leg
ASA (Angola)	0–0 (4–2 p)	(Kenya) Gor Mahia	0–0	0–0
Insurance FC (Ethiopia)	2–1	(Niger) Zumunta AC	2–0	0–1
Simba SC (Tanzania)	3–2	(Algeria) USM El Harrach	3–0	0–2
Stella Adjamé (Ivory Coast)	3–3 (a)	(Gabon) Mbilinga FC	1–1	2–2

== Semi-finals ==
Team 1	Agg.	Team 2	1st leg	2nd leg
Simba SC (Tanzania)	3–1	(Angola) ASA	3–1	0–0
Stella Adjamé (Ivory Coast)	3–1	(Ethiopia) Insurance FC	3–0	0–1

== Final ==
Team 1	Agg.	Team 2	1st leg	2nd leg
Stella Adjamé (Ivory Coast)	2–0	Tanzania Simba Sports Club	0–0	2–0

== Winners ==
1993 CAF Cup Winners
(Ivory Coast)
Stella Club d'Adjamé
First title
