= Ranchers Bees F.C. =

Nigerian football club

Ranchers Bees Football Club
- Nickname: Bees
- Founded: 1974; 52 years ago
- Ground: Ranchers Bees Stadium, Kaduna
- Capacity: 10,000
- Chairman: Mr. Nura Abdullahi
- Manager: Ahmed Ahmad
- League: Nigeria Premier Football League
Home colours	Away colours	Third colours

Ranchers Bees F.C. is a Nigerian football club based in Kaduna. Owned by Valencia striker in person of Umar Sadiq. Their home stadium is Ranchers Bees Stadium, a.k.a. Kaduna Township Stadium.

== History ==
=== 1980s ===
Originally known as the DIC (Defense Industry Corp.) Bees, the club was bought by Alhadji Muktar Mohammed Aruwa in the 1980s and renamed "Ranchers Bees."

DIC Bees participated in the 1983 Nigerian first division but lost the 1983 Nigerian Cup to Enugu Rangers on penalty kicks.

=== 2000s ===
They were promoted to the Nigeria Premier League after the 2008–09 season by finishing second in the Nigeria Division 1 with 51 points. For the 2009–10 season, they played some matches in Kano as their stadium was being prepared for the 2009 FIFA U-17 World Cup. They finished the season banished to Calabar and then Minna after fans attacked referees at a home game against Sunshine Stars F.C. They were relegated to the Nigeria National League with two games left after a 6–0 loss to Kwara United F.C.

== Achievements ==
- West African Club Championship (UFOA Cup): 1

1989

== Performance in CAF competitions ==
- CAF Cup Winners' Cup: 1 appearance

1988 – Finalist

Nigeria national league: runner up 2009/10 season Nigeria national league champions 2012/13 season

== Current squad ==
Note: Flags indicate national team as defined under FIFA eligibility rules; some limited exceptions apply. Players may hold more than one non-FIFA nationality.

No.	Pos.	Nation	Player
1	GK	NGR	Kasim Badmos
4	DF	NGR	Team Ojo
18	MF	NGR	Nura Nayara
14	FW	NGR	Ahamad DanSam
3	DF	NGR	Buhari Usman
29	FW	NGR	Samuel Elegah
9	FW	NGR	Shamsu
12	DF	NGR	Babawo
7	FW	NGR	Musa Ladan
-	FW	NGR	Samson Pius
27	FW	NGR	Odeh
-	MF	NGR	Femi Daramola
-	DF	NGR	Mustapha Yaro
-	DF	NGR	Peter Lahaga
16		NGR	Jonathan Madaki
12		NGR	Nansur Adamu

No.	Pos.	Nation	Player
3		NGR	Jemel Ali
4	DF	NGR	Muktar Abdullasheed (Capt.)
1	GK	NGR	Badnmus Kassim
20		NGR	Babawo Ibrahim
18		NGR	Shehu Umar
6		NGR	Teju Ojo
7		NGR	John Chukwudi
-	MF	NGR	Samuel Klu
-	MF	NGR	Okezie Ejeama
-	DF	NGR	Chidozie Nwadike
-	DF	NGR	Nasiru Idris
-		NGR	Dayo Davies
35	MF	NGR	Sunday Ibeji
-		NGR	Augustine Ode
-		NGR	Baleria Abubakar
28	MF	NGR	Prince Onyeze
