= 1981 African Cup Winners' Cup =

Tournament details
- Dates: April - 5 December 1981
- Teams: 32 (from 1 confederation)

Final positions
- Champions: (Cameroon) Union Douala (1st title)
- Runners-up: (Nigeria) Stationery Stores F.C.

Tournament statistics
- Matches played: 47
- Goals scored: 127 (2.7 per match)

The 1981 season of the African Cup Winners' Cup football club tournament was won by Union Douala in two-legged final victory against Stationary Stores F.C. This was the seventh season that the tournament took place for the winners of each African country's domestic cup. Thirty-two sides entered the competition, with Estrela Negra de Bissau, Coastal Union, El Zamalek, Mbabane Highlanders, CS Nere, Zoundourma and Espérance Sportive de Tunis all withdrawing before the 1st leg of the first round and AS Saint Michael withdrawing after the 1st leg of the first round. No preliminary round took place during this season of the competition.

== First round ==
Team 1	Agg.	Team 2	1st leg	2nd leg
CAPS United F.C. (Zimbabwe)	w/o	(Madagascar) AS Saint Michel	8-1	—
Gbessia AC (Guinea)	w/o	(Guinea-Bissau) Estrela Negra de Bissau	—	—
Gor Mahia (Kenya)	w/o	(Tanzania) Coastal Union	—	—
Lavori Publici (Somalia)	w/o	(Egypt) Zamalek SC	—	—
Lubumbashi Sport (Zaire)	4-4 (a)	(Gabon) FC 105 Libreville	4-3	0-1
Kadiogo FC (Republic of Upper Volta)	4-4 (a)	(Togo) AC Semassi F.C.	3-2	1-2
KCC (Uganda)	1-2	(Algeria) EP Sétif	1-0	0-2
Matlama FC (Lesotho)	1-3	(Zambia) Power Dynamos F.C.	1-1	0-2
Nacional de Benguela (Angola)	1-13	(Cameroon) Union Douala	1-7	0-6
Palmeiras de Beira (Mozambique)	w/o	(Eswatini) Mbabane Highlanders	—	—
Réveil Club de Daloa (Ivory Coast)	2-2 (a)	(Mali) Djoliba AC	2-1	0-1
Real Republicans (Sierra Leone)	3-2	(Senegal) ASC Jeanne d'Arc	2-0	1-2
Sekondi Hasaacas F.C. (Ghana)	w/o	(Equatorial Guinea) CS Nere	—	—
Stationery Stores F.C. (Nigeria)	1-1 (5-4 p)	(Libya) Al-Ahly (Benghazi)	1-0	0-1
Tout Puissant Mazembe (Zaire)	7-0	(Central African Republic) ASDR Fatima	5-0	2-0
Zoundourma (Niger)	Cancelled^{1}	(Tunisia) Espérance Sportive de Tunis	—	—

- 1:Both teams withdrew before 1st leg.

== Second round ==
Team 1	Agg.	Team 2	1st leg	2nd leg
CAPS United F.C. (Zimbabwe)	1-1 (1-3 p)	(Nigeria) Stationery Stores F.C.	1-0	0-1
Djoliba AC (Mali)	4-0	(Togo) AC Semassi F.C.	3-0	1-0
FC 105 Libreville (Gabon)	1-4	(Cameroon) Union Douala	1-3	0-1
Gor Mahia (Kenya)	3-1	(Somalia) Lavori Publici	3-0	0-1
Palmeiras de Beira (Mozambique)	1-6	(Zambia) Power Dynamos F.C.	1-1	0-5
Real Republicans (Sierra Leone)	1-4	(Guinea) Gbessia AC	1-2	0-2
Sekondi Hasaacas F.C. (Ghana)	3-1	(Zaire) TP Mazembe	2-1	1-0
EP Sétif (Algeria)	bye^{1}			

- 1:EP Sétif were to play the winners of Zoundourma vs Espérance Sportive de Tunis.

== Quarterfinals ==
Team 1	Agg.	Team 2	1st leg	2nd leg
Djoliba AC (Mali)	2-1	(Kenya) Gor Mahia	2-0	0-1
Gbessia AC (Guinea)	1-4	(Nigeria) Stationery Stores F.C.	0-1	1-3
Power Dynamos F.C. (Zambia)	2-3	(Ghana) Sekondi Hasaacas F.C.	1-0	1-3
Union Douala (Cameroon)	6-1	(Algeria) EP Sétif	5-0	1-1

== Semifinals ==
Team 1	Agg.	Team 2	1st leg	2nd leg
Stationery Stores F.C. (Nigeria)	1-0	(Mali) Djoliba AC	0-0	1-0
Union Douala (Cameroon)	4-4 (a)	(Ghana) Sekondi Hasaacas F.C.	2-1	2-3

== Final ==
Team 1	Agg.	Team 2	1st leg	2nd leg
Union Douala (Cameroon)	2-1	(Nigeria) Stationery Stores F.C.	0-0	2-1

African Cup Winners' Cup Winners
(Cameroon)
Union Douala
First title
