= Cornerstone F.C. =

Ghanaian professional football club

Cornerstone Football Club
- Full name: Kumasi Cornerstone Football Club
- Nickname: Corners 'Obeye yie'
- Founded: 1931
- Ground: Baba Yara Sports Stadium, Kumasi
- Capacity: 40,000
- Chairman: (Ghana) Nana Addo Boaman
- Manager: (Ghana) vacant
- League: Division Two League

Kumasi Cornerstone is a Ghanaian professional football club based in Kumasi, Ashanti. They are currently competing in the Ghana Division Two League.

== Honours ==
- Ghanaian FA Cup
  - Winners (2): 1965, 1989
