= Real Republicans F.C. (Sierra Leone) =

Association football club in Sierra Leone

Real Republicans FC, is a Sierra Leonean football club from the capital Freetown, Sierra Leone. It plays in the Nationwide First Division, the second highest football league in Sierra Leone. Real Republicans were historically one of the most successful clubs in Sierra Leonean football; having won the Premier League in 1981, 1983, and 1984; and also won the Sierra Leone FA Cup in 1986.

== Achievements ==
- Sierra Leone League: 3

1981, 1983, 1984

- Sierra Leonean FA Cup: 1

1986

== Performance in CAF competitions ==
- African Cup of Champions Clubs: 3 appearances

1982: First Round
1984: First Round
1985: First Round

- CAF Cup Winners' Cup: 3 appearances

1981 – Second Round
1987 – withdrew in Preliminary Round
1988 – Second Round
