= ASFAG =

Guinean football club

- Full name: Association Sportive des Forces Armées de Guinée
- Ground: Stade du 28 Septembre; Conakry, Guinea
- Capacity: 25,000
- League: Ligue 1
- 2025–26: 7th
Home colours	Away colours

Association Sportive des Forces Armées de Guinée, known ASFAG, as is a Guinean football club based in Conakry. The team played many seasons in the Guinée Championnat National. In 2003 the club has won the Guinée Championnat National.

== Stadium ==
Currently the team plays at the 25,000 capacity Stade du 28 Septembre.

== Achievements ==
=== National ===
- Guinée Championnat National: 1

Champion: 2003

- Guinée Coupe Nationale: 3

Winner: 1987, 1991, 1996

=== International ===
- UFOA Cup: 1

Winner: 1988
