= Africa Sports d'Abidjan =

Ivorian sports club

Africa Sports
- Full name: Africa Sports d'Abidjan
- Nicknames: Les Aiglons (The Eaglets); Les Oyé
- Founded: 1947; 79 years ago
- Ground: Stade Robert Champroux; Abidjan
- Capacity: 10,000
- Chairman: Kuyo Tea Narcisse
- League: Ligue 2
- 2025–2026: Ligue 2, 5th of 14 group B
- Website: www.africasportsdabidjan.com
Home colours	Away colours

Africa Sports d'Abidjan is a multi-sports club based in Abidjan, Ivory Coast.

== History ==
The club was founded in 1947.

== Sports ==
The club contains teams in the sports of track and field, handball, basketball, and association football. Of these, the football team is the best known. They play at the Stade Champroux. The club is currently playing in Ligue 2, second tier of football in Ivory Coast.

=== Performance in CAF competitions ===
- CAF Champions League: 9 appearances

1997 – Second round
2000 – Group stage
2004 – Group stage

2005 – Second round
2006 – Preliminary round
2008 – First round

2009 – First round
2010 – First round
2012 – First round

- African Cup of Champions Clubs: 12 appearances

1968 – disqualified in First round
1969 – First round
1972 – Second round
1978 – Second round

1979 – Second round
1983 – First round
1984 – First round
1986 – Finalist

1987 – Quarter-finals
1988 – Quarter-finals
1989 – First round
1990 – Second round

- CAF Confederation Cup: 1 appearance

2011 – withdrew in First round

- CAF Cup: 2 appearances

1995 – First round
2001 – Semi-finals

- CAF Cup Winners' Cup: 7 appearances

1980 – Finalist
1982 – Quarter-finals
1992 – Champion

1993 – Finalist
1998 – Semi-finals
1999 – Champion

2003 – Quarter-Finals

== Honours ==
- Côte d'Ivoire Premier Division: 18
  - 1956, 1967, 1968, 1971, 1977, 1978, 1982, 1983, 1985, 1986, 1987, 1988, 1989, 1996, 1999, 2007, 2008, 2011
- Côte d'Ivoire Cup: 21
  - 1953, 1954, 1956, 1958, 1961, 1962, 1964, 1977, 1978, 1979, 1981, 1982, 1985, 1986, 1989, 1993, 1998, 2002, 2009, 2015, 2017
- Coupe Houphouët-Boigny: 12
  - 1977, 1979, 1981, 1982, 1986, 1987, 1988, 1989, 1991, 1993, 2003, 2015
- African Cup Winners' Cup: 2
  - 1992, 1999
- CAF Super Cup: 1
  - 1992
- West African Club Championship (UFOA Cup): 3
  - 1985, 1986, 1991
- French West African Cup: 1
  - 1958

== Managerial history ==
- (Ivory Coast) François Zahoui (2005 – 2006)
- (Italy) Francesco Moriero (November 2006 – July 2007)
- (Italy) Salvatore Nobile (July 2007 – March 2009)
- (Serbia) Đorđe Koković (April 2010 – May 2011)
- (Italy) Salvatore Nobile (October 2011 – April 2012)
