= List of football clubs in Senegal =

The following is a list of football (soccer) clubs in Senegal.

== Key ==
Key to Divisional Change
New club
Club was promoted to a higher level,
winner or runner-up of each regional league qualified into the National Championships
Club was transferred between divisions at the same level
Club resigned or was demoted to a lower level
Club was relegated to a lower level

== A-C ==
Club	Location	League/Division	Lvl	Change from 2016 to 2017
Académie Darou Salam				
Africa Promo				
Agora				
Amitié FC	Thiès			
ASC Jeanne d'Arc	Dakar	Ligue 2	2	
ASC Assur	Richard-Toll	Ligue 2	2	
ASFA	Dakar			
Athletic Saint-Louis	Saint-Louis			
Avenir Mbacké	Mbacké			
Avenir Kolda	Kolda			

== B-C ==
Club	Location	League/Division	Lvl	Change from 2016 to 2017
Bargueth Kébémer				
Birkilane				
ASC Cambérène				
Casa Sports	Ziguinchor	Ligue 1	1	
Cayor Foot FC	Tivaouane	Ligue 2	2	
CNEPS Excellence Football Club				
Coton Sports	Tambacounda			
CSAD	Dakar			

== D ==
Club	Location	League/Division (Regional)	Lvl	Change from 2016 to 2017
Dahra FC				
AS Dakar Sacré-Cœur			1	Promoted into Ligue 1
Dakar UC	Dakar			
Darou Salam	Sébikotane			
Dekkendo	Louga			
ASC Diambars	Dakar-Saly	Ligue 1	1	
ASC Diaraf	Dakar	Ligue 1	1	
Diamono Djourbel (sometimes as Jamono)	Djourbel			
Diokoul FC				
Demba Diop	Mbour			
Don Bosco	Tambacounda			
AS Douanes	Dakar	Ligue 1	1	

== E-G ==
Club	Location	League/Division	Lvl	Change from 2016 to 2017
ETICS Mboro	Mboro			
Espoirs Bignona				
Espoirs	Guédiawaye			
Étoile Lusitana				
CNEPS Excellence				
Foyer Richard-Toll	Richard-Toll			
AS Gadiaga	Bakel			
Génération Foot	Sangalkam	Ligue 1	1	
Gouney Ngaye	Ngaye			
US Gorée	Dakar - Gorée	Ligue 1	2	Relegated into Ligue 2
Guédiawaye FC	Guédiawaye	Ligue 1	1	
US Guinguinéo				

== H-L ==
Club	Location	League/Division (Regional)	Lvl	Change from 2016 to 2017
ASC HLM	Dakar	Ligue 2	2	
Jamono	Fatick			
Jamono	Louga			
Kaffrine FA				
Kawral	Vélingara			
Kaolack FC				
Keur Madior (Note: Sometimes as Keur Mador or Keur Madjor)	Mbour			
ASC Khombole				
La Voix De L'Excellence				
ASC Linguere	Saint-Louis	Ligue 1	2	

== M-P ==
Club	Location	League/Division (Regional)	Lvl	Change from 2016 to 2017
Mama Guedj Joal				
Mbour Petite-Côte FC	Dakar	Ligue 1	1	
ASC Mbaxaan-Thiès	Thiès			
ASC Médiour	Rufisque			
Ndar Guedj	Saint-Louis	Ligue 2	2	
ASEC Ndiambour	Louga			
Ndjolofène	Saint-Louis			
Nguelemou				
Niary Tally	Dakar	Ligue 1	1	
Olympique de Ngor	Dakar - Ngor	Ligue 2	2	
Olympique Thiès	Thiès			
Olympique Ziguinchor	Ziguinchor			
US Ouakam	Dakar - Ouakam	Ligue 1	1	

== P–R ==
Club	Location	League/Division	Lvl	Change from 2016 to 2017
US Parcelles Assainies				
AS Police	Dakar	Ligue 2	2	
AS Pikine	Pikine	Ligue 2	2	
ASC Port Autonome	Dakar	Ligue 2	1	
Racing Dakar	Dakar			
US Rail				
ASC Renaissance de Dakar	Dakar			
Renaissance sportive de Yoff	Yoff			
AJEL de Rufisque	Rufisque			

== S ==
Club	Location	League/Division (Regional)	Lvl	Change from 2016 to 2017
Saint-Louis FC	Saint-Louis			
ASC Saloum	Kaolack	Division 1	3	
Santhiaba	Ziguinchor			
UCA Sédhiou				
Sofa FC				
Someone				
Sporting	Rufisque			
Stade Mbour	Mbour	Ligue 1	1	
Stade Thiaroye	Thiaroye			
ASC SUNEOR	Diourbel	Ligue 2	1	Promoted into Ligue 1

== T-Z ==
Club	Location	League/Division (Regional)	Lvl	Change from 2016 to 2017
Tengueth FC	Tengueth	Ligue 1	1	
SC Thiès	Thiès			
Thiossane Passy				
US Tivaouane				
Wally Daan (Oually Dan) (Note: Sometimes as Oualidane or Oualidan)	Thies			
ASC Xam Xam				
ASC Yakaar				
ASC Yeggo				
Zig Inter Académie				

=== Former clubs ===
Club	Location	Founded	Dissolved	Status Sierra Leone
Coumba Thioupan de Popenguine	Mbour		2014	merged and became part of Mbour Petite-Côte
Djamaguene	Mbour		2014	merged and became part of Mbour Petite-Côte
AS Guedj Gui de Saly	Saly		2014	merged and became part of Mbour Petite-Côte
Mbour AC	Mbour		2014	merged and became part of Mbour Petite-Côte
Océan de Mbour	Mbour		2014	merged and became part of Mbour Petite-Côte
AJ Saly	Saly		2014	merged and became part of Mbour Petite-Côte
Touré Kunda Footpro	Mbour	1986	2014	merged and became part of Mbour Petite-Côte

== See also ==
- Football in Senegal
