= 2009 Senegalese League Cup =

League Cup Coupe de la Ligue
- Season: 2009
- Champions: AS Douanes (1st title)
- Matches: 29
- Goals: 58 (2 per match)
- Biggest home win: ASC HLM
- Biggest away win: ASC Linguère

The 2009 Senegalese League Cup (Coupe de la Ligue) was the first ever edition of the League Cup challenge. The format is like a playoff system and features clubs from the country's top two leagues (Ligue 1 and 2). AS Douanes won the first title. Five rounds were featured and 30 clubs competed. The winner competes into the Assemblée Nationale Cup or the National Assembly Cup, the super cup competition in Senegal.

== First round or 1/16 final ==
Club (division)	Score	Club (division)
Renaissance de Dakar (Ligue 2)	1-1	Olympique Ngor (Ligue 2)	2-3**
ASC Touré Kunda (Ligue 2)	3-0	Etoile Lusitana (Ligue 2)
Etics (Ligue 2)	2-0	ASFA Dakar (Ligue 2)
ASC SUNEOR (Ligue 1)	0-1	NGB (Ligue 2)
ASC Diaraf (Ligue 1)	1-1	Diokoul FC (Ligue 2)	7-8**
Yeggo foot pro (Ligue 2)	0-1	US Gorée (Ligue 1)
ASC Xam Xam (Ligue 2)	0-2	AS Douanes (Ligue 1)
Dakar UC (Ligue 1)	1-2	ASC Port Autonome (Ligue 1)
ASC Yakaar (Ligue 1)	1-0	AS Pikine (Ligue 2)
ASEC Ndiambour (Ligue 1)	3-0	Diambars FC (Ligue 2)
Guédiawaye FC (Ligue 1)	1-2	CSS (Ligue 1)
ASC Saloum (Ligue 1)	1-0	RS Yoff (Ligue 1)
US Ouakam (Ligue 1)	0-0	Stade de Mbour (Ligue 1)	5-6**
ASC HLM (Ligue 1)	4-2	ASC Jeanne d'Arc (Ligue 1)
* - extra time ** - penalty shootout

== 1/4 final ==
Entrants:

  - ASC Linguère
  - Casa Sports

Club (division)	Score	Club (division)
ASC Touré Kunda (Ligue 2)	1-0	ASEC Ndiambour (Ligue 1)
Diokoul FC (Ligue 2)	1-2	CSS (Ligue 1)
AS Douanes (Ligue 1)	2-0	US Gorée (Ligue 1)
ASC Yakaar (Ligue 1)	1-3	ASC Linguère (Ligue 1)
Casa Sports (Ligue 1)	2-0	AS Saloum (Ligue 1)
ASC HLM (Ligue 1)	0-2	ASC Port Autonome (Ligue 1)
Stade de Mbour (Ligue 1)	2-1	NGB (Ligue 2)
Etics (Ligue 2)	1-0	Olympique Ngor (Ligue 2)
* - extra time

== Quarterfinal ==
Club (division)	Score	Club (division)
ASC Linguère (Ligue 1)	1-1	Etics (Ligue 2)	2-3*
Casa Sports (Ligue 1)	1-0	ASC Touré Kunda (Ligue 2)
AS Douanes (Ligue 1)	2-0	ASC Port Autonome (Ligue 1)
Stade de Mbour (Ligue 1)	2-0	CSS (Ligue 1)
* extra time **penalty shootout

== Semifinal ==
Club (division)	Score	Club (division)
Stade de Mbour (Ligue 1)	0-0	AS Douanes (Ligue 1)	2-4**
Etics (Ligue 2)	2-2	Casa Sports (Ligue 1)	2-3*
* - extra time ** - penalty shootout

== Final ==
No first ever final match occurred in the edition as the match was forfeited by Casa Sports as some players did not qualify. AS Douanes won their first ever title of the League Cup.

Club (division)	Score	Club (division)
Casa Sports (Ligue 1)	0-2 (awarded by forfeit)	AS Douanes (Ligue 1)

Senegalese League Cup 2009
Winners
AS Douanes
1st title
