= 2010 Senegalese League Cup =

League Cup Coupe de la Ligue
- Season: 2010
- Champions: Casa Sport (1st title)

The 2010 Senegalese League Cup (Coupe de la Ligue) was the second ever edition of the League Cup challenge. The format is like a playoff system and features clubs from the country's top two leagues (Ligue 1 and 2). AS Douanes won the first title. Five rounds were featured and 32 clubs competed. The winner competes into the Assemblée Nationale Cup or the National Assembly Cup, the super cup competition in Senegal.

== First round or 1/16 final ==
Club (division)	Score	Club (division)
Etics (Ligue 2)	0-0	Thiès FC (Ligue 2)	5-4
Diambars FC (Ligue 2)	1-2	ASC HLM (Ligue 1)
ASC Dahra (Ligue 2)	1-0	NGB (Ligue 1)
ASFA (Ligue 2)	0-2	Renaissance de Dakar (Ligue 2)
AS Douanes (Ligue 1)	0-0	Olympique Ngor (Ligue 2)	5-6**
ASC Jeanne d'Arc (Ligue 1)	0-0	ASC Port Autonome (Ligue 1)	3-4**
AS Pikine (Ligue 1)	1-0*	US Ouakam (Ligue 1)
ASC Suneor (Ligue 2)	0-1	Diokoul FC (Ligue 2)
AS Saloum (Ligue 1)	3-0	US Gorée (Ligue 1)
ASC Yakaar (Ligue 1)	1-0	Etoile Lusitana (Ligue 2)
ASEC Ndiambour (Ligue 1)	0-0	ASC Linguère (Ligue 1)	2-4**
Kaffrine FA (Ligue 2)	0-1	CSS (Ligue 1)
ASC Touré Kunda (Ligue 2)	1-1	RS Yoff (Ligue 1)	0-2**
Guédiawaye FC (Ligue 1)	0-0	Casa Sports (Ligue 1)	3-4**
Yeggo foot pro (Ligue 2)	0-0	Stade de Mbour (Ligue 1)	3-1**
Dakar UC (Ligue 1)	0-1	ASC Diaraf (Ligue 1)
* - extra time ** - penalty shootout

== 1/4 final ==
Club (division)	Score	Club (division)
ASC Linguère (Ligue 1)	1-0	Olympique Ngor (Ligue 2)
Yeggo foot pro (Ligue 2)	0-0	ASC Port Autonome (Ligue 1)	3-4**
CSS (Ligue 1)	0-0	ASC HLM (Ligue 1)	4-1**
ASC Yakaar (Ligue 1)	1-1	Diokoul FC (Ligue 2)	3-1**
ASC Diaraf (Ligue 1)	3-0	RS Yoff (Ligue 1)
AS Pikine (Ligue 1)	2-1	AS Saloum (Ligue 1)
Casa Sports (Ligue 1)	4-0	Renaissance de Dakar (Ligue 2)
ASC Dahra (Ligue 2)	-	Etics (Ligue 2)
* - extra time

== Quarterfinal ==
Club (division)	Score	Club (division)
CSS (Ligue 1)	0-2	ASC Diaraf (Ligue 1)
ASC Port Autonome (Ligue 1)	2-0	ASC Yakaar (Ligue 1)
Casa Sports (Ligue 1)	1-0	ASC Linguère (Ligue 1)
AS Pikine (Ligue 1)	2-0	ASC Dahra (Ligue 2)

== Semifinal ==
Club (division)	Score	Club (division)
ASC Diaraf (Ligue 1)	2-0	ASC Port Autonome (Ligue 1)
Casa Sports (Ligue 1)	2-1	AS Pikine (Ligue 1)

== Final ==
The first ever final match of the League Cup took place. Casa Sports defeated ASC Diaraf 1-2 and claimed their first title, the second club to win their first title.

Club (division)	Score	Club (division)
ASC Diaraf (Ligue 1)	1-2	Casa Sports (Ligue 1)

Winner
Casa Sports
1st title
