= ASC Jeanne d'Arc =

Association football club in Senegal

- Full name: Association Sportive et Culturelle; Jeanne d'Arc
- Founded: 23 April 1923; 103 years ago
- Ground: Stade Demba Diop, Dakar, Senegal
- Capacity: 20,000
- Chairman: Khadim Ndiaye
- Manager: Mouhamed Ngom
- League: Senegalese National 1
- 2014–2015: 2nd (Group B)
Home colours	Away colours

Old crest

Association Sportive et Culturelle Jeanne d'Arc or ASC Jeanne d'Arc for short is a Senegalese football club based in Dakar. It was founded in 1923 and one of the oldest in the country. They play at the Stade Léopold Sédar Senghor. The club currently plays in National 1. Since 1975, the club is second with the most championship titles numbering ten, one less than ASC Diaraf. The total honors that Jeanne d'Arc has won is 25, second after Djaraf.

== History ==
=== Jeanne d'Arc at the top flight competition ===
The club was the first club to win a title for an independent Senegal, their second was in 1969, their third was in 1973, Jeanne d'Arc won two consecutive titles in 1986, they won sixth title in 1988. The club was second place in 1992, then third in 1993, then relegated being last in group stage in 1995, a year, the club returned and was 8th in 1997, two years later, the club won their seventh title in 1999 and finished with 53 points, their record, the club finished fifth in 2000. The team won three consecutive titles in 2003, their tenth is their recent one for the club, in 2002, the club finished with 52 points and 51 a year later. In 2004, the longest season in Senegal, the club finished ninth with 53 points, tying the 1999 record. The team scored 41 goals, the club's highest, in 2005; Jeanne d'Arc again finished ninth that year. Jeanne d'Arc appeared in group stages for the next five years, they were in Group B in 2006 and 2009 and Group A in 2007, 2008 and 2010, the club finished fourth for three consecutive years and finished fifth in 2010. In 2011, the club was finished 15th with 29 points ahead of ASC HLM inside the relegation zone, this was Jeanne d'Arc's recent appearance in a top flight league. Some years later relegated into National 1 and as of 2015, the club was second in Group B.

In the number of titles, the club was the leader in the most titles for the country until 1966, the club shared the most national titles with Olympique Thiès in 1969 and later ASFA Dakar in 1972, the club was again the leader with three titles in 1973. The title totals was shared with ASFA Dakar in 1974 and Diaraf in 1975. The club became second in the number of titles in 1976 behind Diaraf until 1988 when the number of titles was shared with Diaraf again until 1989 and continued to be second in the number of titles until 2002 when the title total numbers was shared with Diaraf, after winning their tenth title and being the club's recent, the totals was one over Diaraf's and shared it again in 2004. Since 2005, the clubs is now again second in the most titles.

=== Jeanne d'Arc at the Senegalese Cup finals ===
Their first cup final appearance as in 1962 and became the second club to win their first cup title after defeating Foyer de Casamance (now Casa Sports) 6–1, the cup final result is the highest to date. Seven years later, the club won their second title, their appearances in the 1972 and 1973 cup final finished as a finalist, the first was lost to US Gorée 2-1 and Diaraf 2–0, the club won their third cup title in 1974 after defeating ASFA Dakar 2–1, Jeanne d'Arc's sixth cup appearance was in 1980 and faced against Casa Sport 1-1 and 1-0 and claimed their fourth cup title, their seventh appearance was four years later and the club defeated ASC Linguère from the northwest of the country 1-0 and won their fifth title. Two years later, the club lost to AS Douanes 1–0. A year later, the club defeated SEIB Diourbel (now as ASC SUNEOR) 1–0 to win their sixth and recent Senegalese Cup title for the club in 1987. On the club's last appearance in a cup final, the club lost 2–1 to Diaraf in 1991.

== Achievements ==
- Senegal Premier League: 10

1960, 1969, 1973, 1985, 1986, 1988, 1999, 2001, 2002, 2003

- Senegal FA Cup: 6

1962, 1969, 1974, 1980, 1984, 1987

- Senegal Assemblée Nationale Cup: 3

1986, 1989, 2001

- CAF Cup: 0

Finalist : 1998

- French West African Cup: 2

1951, 1952

== League and cup history ==
=== National level ===
Season	Div.	Pos.	Pl.	W	D	L	GS	GA	GD	P	Cup	League Cup	AN Cup	Notes	Final Phase
1981	1	6	26	8	10	8	28	22	+6	27					
1984	1	4	26	-	-	-	-	-	-	30	Winner				
1985	1	1	26	-	-	-	-	-	-	-					
1986	1	1	-	-	-	-	-	-	-	-			Winner		
1988	1	1	-	-	-	-	-	-	-	-					
1990-91	1	7	30	8	15	7	28	25	+3	31					
1991-92	1	2	30	15	9	6	27	10	+17	39					
1992-93	1	3	28	-	-	-	-	-	-	46					
1995	1A	9	16	2	5	9	7	16	-9	11				Did not advance	Did not participate
1996	2		-	-	-	-	-	-	-						
1997	1	8	26	-	-	-	-	-	-	31					
1998	1	5	26	-	-	-	-	-	-	36					
1999	1	1	26	16	5	5	32	14	+18	53					
2000	1	5	22	8	8	6	21	13	+8	32					
2000-01	1	1	26	13	8	5	22	6	+16	47			Winner		
2001-02	1	1	26	15	17	3	34	12	+22	52					
2002-03	1	1	26	14	9	3	28	11	+17	51			Winner		
2003-04	1	9	38	13	14	11	41	26	+3	53					
2005	1	9	34	10	16	8	35	30	+5	44					
2006	1B	4	16	7	5	4	14	13	+1	26				Did not advance	
2007	1A	4	16	5	5	6	18	21	-3	20				Did not advance	Did not participated
2008	1A	4	18	6	8	4	20	15	+5	26				Did not advance	Did not participated
2009	1B	8	16	3	6	7	8	13	-5	15		1/16 final		Did not advance	Did not participate
2010	1A	5	16	5	8	3	11	11	0	23		1/16 final		Did not advance	Did not participate
2010-11	1	15	30	6	11	13	18	30	-12	29					
2014–15	3	2	-	-	-	-	-	-	-	-					

== Statistics ==
- Best position: Semifinalist (continental)
- Best position at a cup competition: Finalist (continental)
- Highest number of points in a season: 53, in 1999 and in 2003 and 2004
- Highest number of wins in a season: 15, in 2001–02
- Highest number of goals scored in a season: 41, in 2003–04
- Appearances at the Senegalese Cup finals: 6

== Current squad ==
Note: Flags indicate national team as defined under FIFA eligibility rules; some limited exceptions apply. Players may hold more than one non-FIFA nationality.

No.	Pos.	Nation	Player
—	GK	SEN	Bity Sy
—	DF	SEN	Alpha Cissokho
—	DF	SEN	Abdoulaye Ndao

No.	Pos.	Nation	Player
—	DF	SEN	Ousseynou Ndiaye
—	MF	GAM	Abdurahman Conateh
—	FW	SEN	Pape Alioune Badara Diouf

== Notable players ==
- (Burkina Faso) Narcisse Yameogo
- (France) Aboubacar Fofana
- (France) (Senegal) Oumar Dieng
- (Liberia) Sekou Keita
- (Mauritania) Bilal Sidibé
- (Senegal) Pape Samba Ba
- (Senegal) Kébé Baye
- (Senegal) Abdoulaye Faye
- (Senegal) Lamine Diarra
- (Senegal) Baba Diawara
- (Senegal) Birahim Diop
- (Senegal) Papa Malick Diop
- (Senegal) Pape Mamadou Diouf
- (Senegal) Pascal Mendy
- (Senegal) Roger Mendy
- (Senegal) Assane N'Diaye
- (Senegal) (Mali) Mamoutou N'Diaye
- (Senegal) Sidath N'Diaye
- (Senegal) Dame N'Doye
- (Senegal) Issa N'Doye
- (Senegal) Ousmane N'Doye
- (Senegal) Khalidou Sissokho
- (Mali) Ibrahima Kone"Abba"

== Presidents ==
- (Senegal) Mahmoud Tapar Segar (in 2008)
- (Senegal) Augustin Senghor (in 2012)

== Managers ==
- (Senegal) Cheikh Tidiane Biteye
