= ASAC Ndiambour =

Senegalese football club

- Full name: Association Sportive Artistique et Culturelle Ndiambour
- Founded: 1969; 57 years ago
- Ground: Stade Alboury Ndiaye; Louga, Senegal
- Capacity: 3.000
- Chairman: Abdoulaye Bao
- Manager: Doudou Sarr
- League: Senegal Premier League
- 2021–22: 13th
Home colours	Away colours

Association Sportive Artistique et Culturelle Ndiambour (abbreviated ASAC Ndiambour, Wolof: Njaambur or Njambuur) is a Senegalese football club based in Louga, which is part of the Senegal National League 2 Poule A (second tier). Their home stadium is Stade Alboury Ndiaye.

Ndiambour (or Ndjambour) also is fifth in the number of major honours won in Senegal numbering seven.

== History ==
The team was founded in 1969. It is named after the historic province of Cayor (Wolof: Kayor) once existed in the pre-colonial times, it corresponds to Louga Region today.

=== Championship history ===
Their first cup final appearance was in 1985 and lost to ASC Diaraf 1–0, their second appearance also lost by a goal to US Gorée in the 1996 edition, Ndiambour won the 1999 edition after defeating SONACOS of Diourbel only in penalty shoots of 3–0 as the game was tied a goal apiece, this was their final appearance.

They played up to 2009 in the top division in Senegalese football, they were last place in Group A with 12 points and relegated into Ligue 2, they remained until they were first place in the 2014–15 season and returned to the top division for the following season. ASEC Ndiambour finished 10th with 32 points, nine wins and scored 20 goals, the club conceded 28 goals in 2016. Ndjambour started 6th, then 12th at the second round then 14th at the fourth round and did not return to 12th until the 12th round. At the 16th round, Ndjambour feared that they could be possibly relegated for Ligue 2, Ndjambour was 14th at the 19th round but climbed back to 20th a week later. In the last two rounds, they shared the same result (6 wins, 8 draws, 11 losses) as to Linguère's, after Ndjambour's 2–0 win over Niarry-Tally and scored the club's last goals of the season. Ndjambour kept their chance of remaining in Ligue 1 and had 26 goals, two more than Linguères and returned to the 12th position. At the final round, the made a scoreless draw with Douanes and the club will participate in Ligue 1 in the following season, also their results changed and had 9 draws and 11 wins, but had the same 6 wins with three other clubs including Douanes, Teungueth FC and Linguère. In goal concessions, Ndjambour suffered and conceded 42 goals, the most of the season, behind 7th place Mbour Petite-Côte with 37.

=== Continental appearances ===
They've participated in seven continental tournaments in the continental level, five of them were cup tournaments, their greatest success was the quarter-finals in the CAF Cup Winner's Cup. Their first cup appearance was in 1992 where they first challenged with East End Lions from Sierra Leone, as the two matches were scoreless, they scored 5 in penalties to get to the next round where they later challenged with Tunisia's CA Bizertin and lost the competition. Their recent cup competition was in 2005 where they faced King Faisal Babes from Ghana and only scored a goal in two of its legs.

Their first continental appearance was in 1993 and faced Cape Verde's CS Mindelense, the first leg was tied apiece at one, they won two goals to one in the second leg and head up to the first round with Morocco's Wydad Casablanca and won 2–1 in the first leg and lost 3–1 in the second and were removed from further competition. Their second and recent was the 1999 competition as it would be called the CAF Champions League and faced against the Invincible Eleven from Liberia, the other club withdrew and Ndiambour headed to the first round against Raja Casablanca of up north in Morocco and won 2–1 in the first leg and lost 2–1 in the second leg and Ndiambour was out of the competition.

== Staff ==
- (Senegal) Abdoulaye Bao (chairman as of 2024)
- (Senegal) Doudou Sarr (manager as of 2024)

== Honours ==
- Senegal Premier League: 3

1992, 1994, 1998

- Senegal FA Cup: 1

1999

- Senegal Assemblée Nationale Cup: 4

1998, 2002, 2004

- Senegal Second League (Ligue 2): 1

2015

== League and cup history ==
=== Performance in CAF competitions ===
Ndjambour's results in CAF competition
Season	Competition	Qualification method	Round	Opposition	Home	Away	Aggregate
1992	CAF Cup	Senegalese Cup Runner-up	First Round	(Sierra Leone) East End Lions	0–0	0–0	0–0 (5–4 pen.)
1992	CAF Cup	Senegalese Cup Runner-up	Second Round	(Tunisia) CA Bizertin	1–0	4–1	2–4
1993	African Cup of Champions Clubs	Senegalese champions	Preliminary Round	(Cape Verde) CS Mindelense	2–1	1–1	3–2
1993	African Cup of Champions Clubs	Senegalese champions	First Round	(Morocco) Wydad Casablanca	2–1	3–1	3–4
1999	CAF Champions League	Senegalese champions	Preliminary Round	(Liberia) Invincible Eleven	4–0	w/o (Note: The Invincible Eleven withdrew)	4–0
1999	CAF Champions League	Senegalese champions	First Round	(Morocco) Raja Casablanca	2–1	3–1	3–4
2000	CAF Cup Winners' Cup	Senegalese cup winners	First Round	(Ivory Coast) ASEC Mimosas	2–0	3–1	3–3 (a)
2000	CAF Cup Winners' Cup	Senegalese cup winners	Second Round	(Angola) GD Sagrada Esperança	0–0	1–1	1–1 (a)
2000	CAF Cup Winners' Cup	Senegalese cup winners	Quarterfinals	(Egypt) Zamalek SC	1–0	3–1	2–3
2001	CAF Cup		First Round	Al-Mahalla SC	2–0	2–1	3–2
2001	CAF Cup		Second Round	(Morocco) Wydad Casablanca	0–2	1–1	1–3
2002	CAF Cup		First Round	(Burkina Faso) ASFA Yennenga	0–0	1–1	1–1 (a)
2002	CAF Cup		Second Round	(Algeria) JS Kabylie	1–1	0–0	1–1 (a) - lost
2005	CAF Confederation Cup	Assemblée Nationale winners	Intermediate Round	(Ghana) King Faisal Babes	1–1	3–0	1–4

=== WAFU Club Championship ===
ASC Diaraf results at the WAFU Club Championship
Season	Competition	Qualification method	Round	Opposition	Home	Away	Aggregate
1996	WAFU Club Championship	Division 1 Runner-up	Semifinals	(Sierra Leone) East End Lions	2–0	2–1	3–2

=== National level ===
Season	Div.	Pos.	Pl.	W	D	L	GS	GA	GD	P	Cup	League Cup	Super Cup	Notes	Final Phase
1981	1	8	26	8	9	9	21	21	0	25					
1990-91	1	2	30	13	12	5	21	12	+9	38					
1991-92	1	1	30	14	13	3	20	9	+11	41					
1992-93	1	5	28	-	-	-	-	-	-	41					
1995	1B	1	16	8	6	2	15	4	+11	30				Participated in the knockout stage	Semifinalist
1997	1	4	26	-	-	-	-	-	-	43					
1998	1	1	26	-	-	-	-	-	-	47			Winner		
1999	1	2	26	16	5	5	32	14	+18	53	Winner				
2000	1	3	22	10	5	7	23	21	+2	35					
2000-01	1	2	26	11	12	3	23	9	+14	45					
2001-02	1	3	26	10	9	6	18	15	+3	39			Winner		
2002-03	1	5	26	11	6	9	19	18	+1	39					
2003-04	1	3	38	19	8	11	29	20	+9	65			Winner	Participated in the 2004 CAF Confederation Cup	
2005	1	13	34	9	14	11	23	30	-7	41					
2006	1A	8	16	2	9	5	4	8	-4	15				Did not advance	Did not participated
2007	1A	7	16	3	8	5	11	16	-5	17				Did not advance	Did not participated
2008	1A	7	18	5	8	5	13	16	-3	23				Did not advance	Did not participate
2009	1A	9	16	2	6	8	5	18	-3	16		1/8 final		Relegated to Ligue 2	
2010	2A	3	7	3	2	2	8	4	+4	11		First round		Relegated to Ligue 2	
2010-11	2	8	-	-	-	-	-	-	-	-					
2014-15	2	1	-	-	-	-	-	-	-	-					
2015-16	1	10	26	9	5	12	20	28	-8	32					
2016-17	1	12	26	6	9	11	26	41	-15	27					

== Statistics ==
- Best appearance: First round (continental), second round (cup, continental)
- Best position at a cup competition: Quarterfinals (continental)
- Appearances at a Super Cup competition: 3
- Highest number of points in a season: 65
- Total goals scored at a national cup final: 1
- Total matches played at the CAF Champions League: 7
  - Total matches played at home: 4
  - Total matches played away: 3
- Total number of wins at the CAF Champions League: 4
  - Total home wins: 4
- Total draw at the CAF Champions League: 1
  - Total away draw:1
- Total number of goals scored at the CAF Champions League: 13
- Total matches played at the continental cup competitions: 20
  - Total matches played at home: 10
  - Total matches played away: 10
- Total number of wins at the continental cup competitions: 6
- Total number of draws at the continental cup competitions: 7
  - Total draws at home: 4
  - Total draws away: 3
- Total number of goals scored at the continental cup competitions:15

== Other sports ==
Ndiambour also has its own basketball team known as Ndiambour Louga.

== See also ==
- Ndiambour, a historic province
  - Njambuur (P773), ship of the Senegalese Navy
