= 2002–03 Division 1 (Senegal) =

Division 1
- Season: 2002-03
- Champions: ASC Jeanne d'Arc
- Runner up: ASC Jeanne d'Arc
- Promoted: ASC Linguère; ASC HLM de Dakar
- Matches: 182
- Goals: 255 (1.4 per match)
- Top goalscorer: (Senegal) Lamine Diarra (9)

The 2002-03 Division 1 season was the 38th of the competition of the first-tier football in Senegal. The tournament was organized by the Senegalese Football Federation. The season began on 9 November 2002 and finished on 29 June 2003. ASC Jeanne d'Arc won the tenth title and the next club to win two in a row, thus made the club to win the most number of national championship titles until the following season when Diaraf would share it once more with ten in the following season.

Reforms that had made by the CAF, the merger of the CAF Winners' Cup and the CAF Cup and became the CAF Confederation Cup, the continental qualifications changed. The qualification into the CAF Champions League would have two clubs, the winner and the second place, the third place club and the winner of the Senegal FA Cup qualified to the newly merged Confederation Cup. ASC Jeanne d'Arc and second place ASC Diaraf qualified to the 2004 CAF Champions League and qualified to the 2004 CAF Confederation Cup, AS Douanes (third in the premier division), winner of the 2003 Senegal FA Cup and semifinalist ASC Thiès (the club participated in Division 2 during the season).

The season would again feature fourteen clubs. The problems that occurred in Division 2 cancelled relegations of clubs to the second division, six clubs would elevate into the premier division and risen the clubs to 20 the following season and would be longer with 38 matches and record breaking in the country.

ASC Jeanne d'Arc was the defending team of the title. The season featured 182 matches and scored 255 goals, fewer than last season.

== Participating clubs ==
- ASC Linguère
- Compagnie sucrière sénégalaise (Senegalese Sugar Company)
- ASC Port Autonome
- AS Douanes
- ASC Jeanne d'Arc
- ASFA Dakar
- AS Police
- ASC HLM
- ASC Diaraf
- US Rail
- Dakar Université Club
- SONACOS
- ASEC Ndiambour
- Stade de Mbour

== Overview ==
The league was contested by 14 teams with ASC Jeanne d'Arc again winning the championship.

== League standings ==
Pos	Team	Pld	W	D	L	GF	GA	GD	Pts
1	ASC Jeanne d'Arc	26	14	9	3	28	11	+17	51
2	ASC Diaraf	26	12	11	3	28	11	+17	47
3	AS Douanes	26	11	10	5	23	12	+11	43
4	Dakar Université Club	26	9	12	5	24	19	+5	39
5	ASEC Ndiambour	26	11	6	9	19	18	+1	39
6	US Rail	26	7	12	7	20	20	0	33
7	Compagnie sucrière sénegalaise	26	6	13	7	13	11	+2	31
8	ASC Linguère	26	7	9	10	20	22	-2	30
9	ASC HLM	26	7	9	10	17	21	-4	30
10	SONACOS	26	6	12	8	16	21	-5	30
11	Stade de Mbour	26	6	11	9	14	20	-6	29
12	ASC Port Autonome	26	5	12	9	8	15	-7	27
13	AS Police	26	5	11	10	16	25	-9	26
14	ASFA Dakar	26	4	7	15	9	29	-20	19

2004 CAF Champions League
2004 CAF Confederation Cup

Division 1 2002-03
Champions
ASC Jeanne d'Arc
10th title
