= 2011–12 Ligue 1 (Senegal) =

Ligue 1
- Season: 2012
- Champions: US Ouakam
- Runner up: ASC Diaraf
- Promoted: Diambars FC; ASC Yeggo
- Relegated: ASC Yakaar; Dahra FC
- Matches: 120
- Goals: 194 (1.62 per match)

The 2012 Ligue 1 season was the 49th of the competition of the first-tier football in Senegal and the fifth professional season. The tournament was organized by the Senegalese Football Federation. The season began slightly later on 24 December 2011 and finished on 2 September 2012. It was the fourth season labelled as a "League" ("Ligue" in French). Casa Sport won their first and only title, and a year later would compete in the 2013 CAF Champions League. ASC HLM (participated in Ligue 2 during the season) the winner of the 2012 Senegalese Cup participated in the 2013 CAF Confederation Cup the following season.

The season would have feature 16 clubs, this time into two groups A and B and the final phase or the title pool would be used. The first two of each group succeeds into the final phase and the club with the highest number of points wins the title. Both the group system and the final phase would appear for the last time in Senegalese top level division. The season scored a total of 194, of which 176 were in groups A (97 goals) and B (79 goals) and 18 in the final phase. Diambars and Ouakam scored the most goals sharing the club total of 18, five clubs scored under ten goals, Yakaar and Dahra scored only a total of four goals, the lowest in several years. The season had a total of 120 matches, 112 in groups A and B. The goal totals were 40% less than the previous season.

US Ouakam again was the defending team of the title.

== Participating clubs ==
- NGB ASC Niarry Tally
- Diambars FC
- AS Douanes
- ASC Yeggo
- Dakar Université Club
- ASC Linguère
- Compagnie sucrière sénégalaise (Senegalese Sugar Company)
- ASC Touré Kunda
- ASC Diaraf
- Casa Sport
- US Ouakam
- US Gorée
- ASC Yakaar
- AS Pikine
- Guédiawaye FC
- Dahra FC

== Overview ==
The league was contested by 16 teams, of which 8 clubs were in each of the two groups.

== League standings ==
=== Group A ===
Pos	Team	Pld	W	D	L	GF	GA	GD	Pts
1	Diambars FC	14	8	2	4	18	8	+10	26
2	US Ouakam	14	6	7	1	18	7	+11	25
3	Dakar Université Club	14	7	3	4	10	9	+1	24
4	Compagnie sucrière sénégalaise	14	5	6	3	11	10	+1	21
5	ASC Linguère	14	4	6	4	12	12	0	18
6	Guédiawaye FC	14	4	3	7	10	17	-7	15
7	US Gorée	14	3	5	6	14	17	-3	14
8	ASC Yakaar	14	0	6	8	4	17	-13	6

=== Group B ===
Pos	Team	Pld	W	D	L	GF	GA	GD	Pts
1	NGB ASC Niarry Tally	14	8	4	2	13	7	+6	28
2	Casa Sports	14	7	4	3	15	6	+9	25
3	ASC Jaraaf	14	7	4	3	17	8	+9	25
4	AS Pikine	14	6	4	4	13	12	+1	22
5	AS Douanes	14	3	6	5	6	8	-2	15
6	ASC Touré Kunda (Note: Sometimes as Touré Kanda)	14	2	8	4	5	7	-2	14
7	ASC Yeggo	14	2	5	7	6	14	-8	11
8	Dahra FC	14	1	5	8	4	17	-13	8

Qualification into the second phase
Relegation to Ligue 2

=== Second and final phase ===
Pos	Team	Pld	W	D	L	GF	GA	GD	Pts
1	Casa Sports	6	3	2	1	5	2	+3	11
2	Diambars FC	6	3	1	2	6	4	+2	10
3	NGB ASC Niarry Tally	6	2	1	3	6	7	-1	7
4	US Ouakam	6	1	1	4	1	5	-4	4

Club	CASA	DMB	NTY	OUKM
Casa Sport		0-2	2-0	0-0
Diambars FC	0-1		0-0	1-0
NGB ASC Niarry Tally	0-2	2-3		1-0
US Ouakam	0-0	1-0	0-3	

Qualification into the 2013 CAF Champions League

Ligue 1 2011-12
Champions
Casa Sport
1st title
