= 1999 Division 1 (Senegal) =

Division 1
- Season: 1999
- Champions: ASC Jeanne d'Arc
- Runner up: ASEC Ndiambour
- Promoted: AS Police; ASFA Dakar
- Relegated: Dakar Université Club; ASC Yeggo; AS Police; ASFA Dakar
- Matches: 182
- Goals: 305 (1.68 per match)

The 1999 Division 1 season was the 34th of the competition of the first-tier football in Senegal. The tournament was organized by the Senegalese Football Federation. The season began on January 10 and finished on 19 September 1999. ASC Jeanne d'Arc won the seventh title and participated in the 2000 CAF Champions League the following year. ASEC Ndiambour participated in the 2000 CAF Cup of Cups and Compagnie sucrière sénégalaise participated in the 2000 CAF Winners' Cup.

Four clubs would be relegated to Division 2 the following season, and the number of clubs in Division 1 was reduced to twelve.

ASEC Ndiambour was the defending team for the title. A total of 14 clubs participated in the competition. The season featured 183 matches and scored 305 goals.

== Participating clubs ==
- US Gorée
- Compagnie sucrière sénégalaise (Senegalese Sugar Company)
- ASC Port Autonome
- AS Douanes
- ASC Jeanne d'Arc
- ASC Yeggo
- AS Police
- ASC Niayès-Pikine
- Dakar Université Club
- Stade de Mbour
- US Rail
- ASFA Dakar
- SONACOS
- ASEC Ndiambour

== Overview ==
The league was contested by 14 teams with ASC Jeanne d'Arc winning the championship.

== League standings ==
Pos	Team	Pld	W	D	L	GF	GA	GD	Pts
1	ASC Jeanne d'Arc	26	16	5	5	32	14	+18	53
2	ASC Ndiambour	26	13	7	6	27	15	+12	46
3	Compagnie sucrière sénégalaise	26	11	10	5	28	15	+13	43
4	SONACOS	26	8	12	6	21	18	+3	36
5	ASC Diaraf	26	7	14	5	22	18	+4	35
6	US Rail	26	10	5	11	26	27	-1	35
7	US Gorée	26	7	13	7	23	24	-1	33
8	ASC Niayès-Pikine	26	7	12	7	19	21	-2	33
9	AS Douanes	26	7	11	8	17	19	-2	32
10	ASC Port Autonome	26	8	7	11	20	25	-5	31
11	Dakar Université Club	26	7	8	11	18	29	-11	29
12	ASC Yeggo	26	5	13	8	22	28	-6	28
13	AS Police	26	4	12	10	14	21	-7	24
14	ASFA Dakar	26	4	12	10	14	21	-7	24

2000 CAF Champions League
2000 Cup of Cups
2000 CAF Winner's Cup
Relegation to Division 2

Division 1 1999
Champions
ASC Jeanne d'Arc
7th title
