= Senegal FA Cup =

- Founded: 1961
- Region: Senegal
- Current champions: Mbour Petite-Côte FC (3rd title)
- Most championships: ASC Diaraf (16 titles)
- 2025 Senegal FA Cup

The Senegal FA Cup is the top knock-out tournament in Senegalese football. It was created in 1961. The current champion is Niarry-Tally who won their only title in 2016 and compete in League 1 of the Senegalese football pyramid. ASC Diaraf have won the most cup titles (16), most recently in 2023. Since 1977, the winner competes in the Senegalese Super Cup (formerly the Assemblée Nationale Cup), the super cup of Senegalese football against the national league champion. If the national league champion also wins the FA cup then the second place club in league 1 competes. The winner of the FA cup qualifies for the continental CAF Confederation Cup.

== Winners ==
Year	Winners	Score	Runners-up	Venue
1961	Espoir de Saint-Louis			
1962	ASC Jeanne d'Arc (Dakar)	6–1	Foyer de Casamance	
1963	US Rail (Thiès)	3–2	Olympique de Ngor	
1964	US Ouakam (Dakar)	1–0	Olympique Thiès	
1965	US Gorée	2–1	Olympique Thiès	
1966	AS Saint-Louisienne			
1967	Foyer France (Dakar)	2–1	US Gorée	Dakar
1968	Foyer France (Dakar)	4–0	US Gorée	Dakar
1969	ASC Jeanne d'Arc (Dakar)			
1970	ASC Diaraf (Dakar)	3–1	Almadies	
1971	ASC Linguère (Saint-Louis)	3–0	ASC Diaraf (Dakar)	
1972	US Gorée	2–1	ASC Jeanne d'Arc (Dakar)	Dakar
1973	ASC Diaraf (Dakar)	2–0	ASC Jeanne d'Arc (Dakar)	Dakar
1974	ASC Jeanne d'Arc (Dakar)	2–1	ASFA Dakar	Dakar
1975	ASC Diaraf (Dakar)	2–0	AS Police (Dakar)	Dakar
1976	AS Police (Dakar)	3–1	ASC Diaraf (Dakar)	Dakar
1977	Saltigues Rufisque	1–0	Dial Diop	
1978	AS Police (Dakar)	3–0	US Gorée	Dakar
1979	Casa Sport FC (Ziguinchor)	2–0	ASC Diaraf (Dakar)	Dakar
1980	ASC Jeanne d'Arc (Dakar)	1–1; 1–0	Casa Sport FC (Ziguinchor)	
1981	AS Police (Dakar)	3–1	ASC Diaraf (Dakar)	Dakar
1982	ASC Diaraf (Dakar)	2–1	AS Police (Dakar)	Dakar
1983	ASC Diaraf (Dakar)	1–0	AS Police (Dakar)	Dakar
1984	ASC Jeanne d'Arc (Dakar)	1–0 (aet)	ASC Linguère (Saint-Louis)	
1985	ASC Diaraf (Dakar)	1–0	ASEC Ndiambour (Louga)	
1986	AS Douanes (Dakar)	1–0	ASC Jeanne d'Arc (Dakar)	Dakar
1987	ASC Jeanne d'Arc (Dakar)	1–0	SEIB (Diourbel)	
1988	ASC Linguère (Saint-Louis)	1–0	Saltigues Rufisque	
1989	US Ouakam (Dakar)	1–0	ASFA Dakar	Dakar
1990	ASC Linguère (Saint-Louis)	1–0	ASC Port Autonome (Dakar)	
1991	ASC Diaraf(Dakar)	2–1	ASC Jeanne d'Arc (Dakar)	Dakar
1992	US Gorée	2–1	ASC Diaraf (Dakar)	Dakar
1993	ASC Diaraf (Dakar)	2–0	ASC Linguère (Saint-Louis)	
1994	ASC Diaraf (Dakar)	1–0	CSS Richard-Toll	
1995	ASC Diaraf (Dakar)	2–0	AS Douanes	Dakar
1996	US Gorée	1–0	ASEC Ndiambour (Louga)	
1997	AS Douanes (Dakar)	3–1	ASC Linguère (Saint-Louis)	
1998	ASC Yeggo (Dakar)	1–0	US Gorée	
1999	ASEC Ndiambour (Louga)	1–1 aet (3–0 pen)	SONACOS (Diourbel)	
2000	Port Autonome (Dakar)	4–0	ASC Saloum (Kaolack)	
2001	SONACOS (Diourbel)	1–0 (aet)	US Gorée	
2002	AS Douanes (Dakar)	1–1 aet (4–1 pen)	SONACOS (Diourbel)	
2003	AS Douanes (Dakar)	1–0	ASC Thiès	
2004	AS Douanes (Dakar)	2–1	ASC Diaraf (Dakar)	Dakar
2005	AS Douanes (Dakar)	1–0	Dakar UC	Dakar
2006	US Ouakam (Dakar)	1–0	ASC Médiour (Rufisque)	
2007	ASC Linguère (Saint-Louis)	1–0 (aet)	AS Douanes (Dakar)	
2008	ASC Diaraf (Dakar)	1–0	Stade Mbour	
2009	ASC Diaraf (Dakar)	1–0	AS Cambérène	
2010	Toure Kunda (Mbour)	0-0 (5–4 pen)	US Gorée	
2011	Casa-Sports FC (Ziguinchor)	1–0	Toure Kunda (Mbour)	
2012	ASC HLM (Dakar)	0-0 (4–3 pen)	Renaissance (Dakar)	Dakar
2013	ASC Diaraf (Dakar)	1–1 (2–1 pen)	Casa-Sports FC (Ziguinchor)	
2014	AS Pikine (Pikine)	2–1 (aet)	Olympique de Ngor	
2015	Génération Foot	4–3 (aet)	Casa-Sports FC (Ziguinchor)	Dakar
2016	ASC Niarry-Tally (Grand-Dakar)	3–0	Casa-Sports FC (Ziguinchor)	
2017	Mbour Petite-Côte FC (Mbour)	1–0	Stade de Mbour (Mbour)	Dakar
2018	Génération Foot	2–0	Renaissance de Dakar	Dakar
2019	Teungueth FC	1–0	US Gorée	
2020				
2021	Casa-Sports FC (Ziguinchor)	1–0	Diambars FC (Saly)	
2022	Casa-Sports FC (Ziguinchor)	3–0	Étoile Lusitana (Dakar)	
2023	ASC Diaraf (Dakar)	2–1	Stade de Mbour	
2024	Mbour Petite-Côte FC (Mbour)	1–0	Académie Les Férus de Foot	
2025	Génération Foot (Dakar)	1–0	ASC Jaraaf (Dakar)	Dakar
2026	UGB SC (Saint-Louis)	0–0 (3–1 pen)	Diambars FC (Saly)	Dakar

=== Performance By Club ===
Club	Winners	Winning years
ASC Diaraf	16	1967, 1968, 1970, 1973, 1975, 1982, 1983, 1985, 1991, 1993, 1994, 1995, 2008, 2009, 2013, 2023
ASC Jeanne d'Arc	6	1962, 1969, 1974, 1980, 1984, 1987
AS Douanes	6	1986, 1997, 2002, 2003, 2004, 2005
US Gorée	4	1965, 1972, 1992, 1996
ASC Linguère	4	1971, 1988, 1990, 2007
Casa-Sports FC	4	1979, 2011, 2021, 2022
AS Police	3	1976, 1978, 1981
Mbour Petite-Côte FC (Note: Formerly known as Toure Kunda Footpro)	3	2010, 2017, 2024
Génération Foot	3	2015, 2018, 2025
US Ouakam	3	1964, 1989, 2006
Espoir de Saint-Louis	1	1961
ASC HLM	1	2012
ASEC Ndiambour	1	1999
ASC Niarry-Tally	1	2016
AS Pikine	1	2014
ASC Port Autonome	1	2000
US Rail	1	1963
Saltigues Rufisque	1	1977
AS Saint-Louisienne	1	1966
SONACOS	1	2001
Teungueth FC	1	2019
ASC Yeggo	1	1998
UGB SC	1	2026

== See also ==
- List of association football competitions
