= 2013 Ligue 1 (Senegal) =

Season of the Senegalese Premier League

Ligue 1
- Season: 2013
- Champions: Diambars FC
- Runner up: Olympique de Ngor
- Promoted: Olympique de Ngor; ASC Port Autonome
- Relegated: US Gorée; AS Douanes; Guédiawaye FC; ASC Assur
- Matches: 240
- Goals: 385 (1.6 per match)

The 2013 Ligue 1 season was the 50th of the competition of the first-tier football in Senegal and the fifth professional season. The tournament was organized by the Senegalese Football Federation. The season began on 13 January and finished earlier on 19 August and it was a season that competed through a single year. It was the fifth season labelled as a "League" ("Ligue" in French). Diambars FC won their only title, and a year later would compete in the 2014 CAF Champions League. ASC Diaraf the winner of the 2013 Senegalese Cup participated in the 2014 CAF Confederation Cup the following season.

== Overview ==
The season would have feature 16 clubs, this time the winner would be decided on a club with the highest number of points after all thirty matches had been finished. The clubs would be reduced to 14 in the following season as four clubs were relegated in the season. The season had a total of 240 matches, 385 goals were scored in the season, almost double than the previous season. Diambars scored the highest 42 goals, the lowest scored was ASC Assur.

US Ouakam again was the defending team of the title.

It was the only time as two clubs shared the same results and were Niarry Tarry and Touré Kunda Foot-Pro, they finished 8th place.

== Participating clubs ==
- NGB ASC Niarry Tally
- Diambars FC
- AS Douanes
- ASC Yeggo
- Dakar Université Club
- ASC Linguère
- ASC Assur
- ASC Touré Kunda
- ASC Diaraf
- ASC Port Autonome
- Olympique de Ngor
- Casa Sport
- US Ouakam
- US Gorée
- AS Pikine
- Guédiawaye FC

=== Information about the clubs ===
Club	Location	2011-12 positions
ASC Assur	Richard-Toll	4th - Group A (Note: Then known as CSS Richard-Toll)
Casa Sport	Ziguinchor	2nd - Group B
Dakar Université Club	Dakar	3rd - Group A
Diambars FC	Saly Portudal	2nd
ASC Diaraf	Dakar	3rd - Group B
AS Douanes	Dakar	5th - Group B
US Gorée	Dakar - Gorée	7th - Group B
Guédiawaye FC	Guédiawaye	6th - Group A
ASC Linguère	Saint-Louis	5th Group A
Olympique de Ngor	Dakar - Ngor	Promoted from Ligue 2
NGB ASC Niarry Tally	Dakar	3rd
US Ouakam	Dakar - Ouakam	4th
AS Pikine	Pikine	4th - Group B
ASC Port Autonome	Dakar	Promoted from Ligue 2
ASC Touré Kunda	Mbour	6th - Group B
ASC Yeggo	Dakar	7th - Group B

== Overview ==
The league was contested by 16 teams.

== League standings ==
Pos	Team	Pld	W	D	L	GF	GA	GD	Pts
1	Diambars FC	30	14	10	6	42	25	+17	52
2	Olympique de Ngor	30	13	11	6	30	24	+6	50
3	AS Pikine	30	12	13	5	21	12	+9	49
4	ASC Diaraf	30	11	13	6	29	20	+9	46
5	ASC Port Autonome	30	11	12	7	27	17	+10	45
6	Casa Sport	30	10	14	6	23	15	+8	44
7	ASC Linguère	30	10	14	6	32	25	+8	44
8	NGB ASC Niarry Tally	30	8	15	7	24	24	0	39
8	ASC Touré Kounda	30	8	15	7	24	24	0	39
10	ASC Yeggo	30	8	14	8	13	13	0	10
11	US Ouakam	30	9	9	12	26	36	-10	36
12	Dakar Université Club	30	7	12	11	30	32	-2	33
13	US Gorée	30	6	12	12	19	33	-14	30
14	AS Douanes	30	5	13	12	15	22	-7	28
15	Guédiawaye FC	30	5	12	13	19	32	-13	27
16	ASC Assur	30	5	8	17	11	33	-22	23

Qualification into the 2014 CAF Champions League
Qualification into the 2014 CAF Confederation Cup
Relegation to Ligue 2

Ligue 1 2013
Champions
Diambars FC
1st title
