= 2006 Division 1 (Senegal) =

Division 1
- Season: 2006
- Champions: AS Douanes
- Runner up: ASC Diaraf
- Promoted: ASC Yakaar; ASC Xam Xam
- Relegated: Compagnie sucrière sénégalaise US Rail
- Matches: 156
- Goals: 244 (1.56 per match)

The 2006 Division 1 season was the 41st of the competition of the first-tier football in Senegal. The tournament was organized by the Senegalese Football Federation. The season began on 5 January and finished on 15 July. AS Douanes won their third title. AS Douanes along with Port Autonome would compete in the 2007 CAF Champions League the following season. US Ouakam who won the 2006 Senegalese Cup participated in the 2007 CAF Confederation Cup, along with US Gorée. Compagnie sucrière sénégalaise, last place of Group A relegated to the second division with 14 points as they had a penalty that cost them three points by an undetermined reason, US Rail, last place of Group B was relegated with only 9 points.

The season would feature 18 clubs. 156 matches (144 in the first phase and 12 in the second phase) were played and 244 goals were scored. Yet again since the 1990s, the season would feature the first and second phases, the first phase featured the group system with a total of 72 matches for each group, the second or final phase would consist of four clubs (instead of a playoff as did in the 1990s) with a total of 12 matches, each club played a total of six matches and the highest number of points would decide the season's champion.

ASC Port Autonome was the defending team of the title.

== Participating clubs ==
- Compagnie sucrière sénégalaise (Senegalese Sugar Company)
- ASC Port Autonome
- AS Douanes
- ASC Jeanne d'Arc
- ASC Saloum
- US Gorée
- Casa Sport
- ASC Yakaar
- ASC Xam Xam
- ASC HLM
- ASC Diaraf
- US Rail
- Dakar Université Club
- SONACOS
- ASEC Ndiambour
- Stade de Mbour
- US Ouakam
- Guédiawaye FC

== Overview ==
The league was contested by 18 teams and two groups, the first phase consisted of 9 clubs in each of the two groups and the second and final phase consisted of only four clubs.

== League standings ==
=== Group A ===
Pos	Team	Pld	W	D	L	GF	GA	GD	Pts
1	AS Douanes	16	7	7	2	16	8	+8	28
2	ASC Diaraf	16	5	9	2	13	10	+3	24
3	Guédiawaye FC	16	4	8	4	10	11	-1	20
4	Stade de Mbour	16	4	8	4	9	10	-1	20
5	SONACOS	16	3	10	3	7	10	-3	19
6	ASC Yakaar	16	3	9	4	10	9	+1	18
7	Dakar Université Club	16	2	10	4	11	12	-1	17
8	ASEC Ndiambour	16	2	9	5	4	8	-4	15
9	Compagnie sucrière sénégalaise -3	16	3	8	5	11	13	-2	14

=== Group B ===
Pos	Team	Pld	W	D	L	GF	GA	GD	Pts
1	ASC HLM	16	9	5	2	20	10	+10	32
2	US Gorée	16	6	9	1	21	12	+9	27
3	ASC Port Autonome	16	6	8	2	15	10	+5	26
4	ASC Jeanne d'Arc	16	7	5	4	14	13	+1	26
5	ASC Xam Xam	16	5	5	6	12	10	+2	20
6	Casa Sport	16	5	4	7	13	15	-2	19
7	ASC Saloum	16	4	5	7	10	15	-5	17
8	US Ouakam	16	4	4	8	10	16	-6	16
9	US Rail	16	2	3	11	8	22	-14	9

Qualification into the second phase
2007 CAF Confederation Cup
Relegation to Division 2

=== Second and final phase ===
Pos	Team	Pld	W	D	L	GF	GA	GD	Pts
1	AS Douanes	6	4	2	0	12	4	+8	14
2	ASC Diaraf	6	1	4	1	8	8	0	7
3	US Gorée	6	1	3	2	6	11	-5	6
4	ASC HLM	6	0	3	#	4	5	-3	3

Club	Dou	Dia	Gor	HLM
AS Douanes		1-0	2-0	3-2
ASC Diaraf	2-2		2-2	2-1
US Gorée	0-4	2-2		0-0
ASC HLM	0-0	0-0	1-2	

2007 CAF Champions League
2007 CAF Confederation Cup

Division 1 2006
Champions
AS Douanes
3rd title
