= 2011–12 Casa Sports season =

Casa Sports
2011–12 season
- Chairman: (Senegal) Seydou Sane
- Manager: (Senegal) Athanas Tendeng
- Stadium: Stade Bemba Diop
Home colours	Away colours	Third colours

The 2011–12 Casa Sports season, were in the top division of Senegalese football. They would win their only championship title. They would be placed second in Group B with 25 points, 7 wins and 15 goals, they would win the finals stage with 11 points, 3 wins and five goals scored. They would participate in the 2013 CAF Champions League the following season.

The highest points scored were two matches with two goals, both against Niarry-Tally.

== Ligue 1 ==
Casa Sport participated in Group B during the 2011-12 season.

Pos	Team	Pld	W	D	L	GF	GA	GD	Pts	Promotion/Relegation
1	NGB ASC Niarry Tally	14	8	4	2	13	7	+6	28	Advanced into the final stage
2	Casa Sports	14	7	4	3	15	6	+9	25	Advanced into the final stage
3	ASC Jaraaf	14	7	4	3	17	8	+9	25	None

=== Second and final phase ===
Pos	Team	Pld	W	D	L	GF	GA	GD	Pts
1	Casa Sports	6	3	2	1	5	2	+3	11
2	Diambars FC	6	3	1	2	6	4	+2	10

Match dates not available Casa Sports participated in Group B during the 2011-12 season.

=== Home matches ===
- Casa Sport - Djambars 0-2
- Casa Sport - Niarry-Tally 2-0
- Casa Sport - US Ouakam 0-0

=== Away matches ===
- Djambars - Casa Sport 0-1
- Niarry-Tally - Casa Sport 0-2
- Casa Sport - Ouakam 0-0

== CAF Confederation Cup ==
Casa Sport club played at the 2012 CAF Confederation Cup, they only faced GAMTEL Banjul which made up of the Senegambian cup derby of 2012. Casa Sport won a goal, then lost to Gamtel, as they had a goal apiece, Casa Sport lost the penalty kicks 3-0 to GAMTEL

Round	Opponents	H/A	Result F–A	Scorers
First Round	GAMTEL	H	1-0	
First Round	GAMTEL	A	1-0 (3-4 p)	

== Squad ==
Note: Flags indicate national team as defined under FIFA eligibility rules; some limited exceptions apply. Players may hold more than one non-FIFA nationality.

No.	Pos.	Nation	Player
—	GK	SEN	Maguette Gningue
—	GK	SEN	Moussa Soukouna
—	GK	SEN	Eymand Djatta
—	GK	SEN	Oumar Moussa Bodian
—	GK	SEN	Alphousseynou Sagna
—	DF	SEN	Mame Saer Thioune
—	DF	SEN	Abdoulaye Djallo
—	DF	SEN	Pierre Coly
—	DF	SEN	Blaise Mingou
—	DF	SEN	Moussa Sagna
—	DF	SEN	Younouss Badji
—	DF	SEN	Pape N'Gomi
—	DF	SEN	Joseph Marie Biaguo
—	MF	SEN	Mody Traore

No.	Pos.	Nation	Player
—	MF	SEN	Stéphane Djarra Badji
—	MF	SEN	Mamading Kidjera
—	FW	SEN	Moustapha Limane Diatta
—	FW	SEN	Siaka San
—	FW	SEN	Chérif Sané
—	FW	SEN	Assane Drame
—	FW	SEN	Sérigne Iboy Ndjaye
—		SEN	Yaya Sonko
—	FW	SEN	Mouhamadou Moustapha Ndiaye
—		SEN	Mamadou M. Mane
—		SEN	Bonaventure Mankabou
—		SEN	Wilson Sagna
—		SEN	Souhaibou Kebe
—		SEN	Samuel Sagna

== Transfers ==
=== Out ===
Date	Pos.	Name
mid-2012	GK	(Senegal) Moussa Soukpouna
mid-2012	GK	(Senegal) Eymand Djatta
mid-2012	GK	(Senegal) Oumar Moussa Bodjan
mid-2012	GK	(Senegal) Alphousseynou Sagna
mid-2012	DF	(Senegal) Pierre Coly
mid-2012	DF	(Senegal) Younouss Badji
mid-2012	DF	(Senegal) Papé Ngomi
mid-2012	DF	(Senegal) Joseph Marie Biaguo
mid-2012	FW	(Senegal) Moustapha Limané Djatta
mid-2013	FW	(Senegal) Chérif Sané
mid-2012	FW	(Senegal) Mouhamadou Moustapha Ndiaye
mid-2012		(Senegal) Mamadou M. Mané
mid-2012		(Senegal) Wilson Sagna
mid-2012		(Senegal) Souhaibou Kebé

== Team kit ==
Home	Away	Third colours
