= 2000–01 Division 1 (Senegal) =

Division 1
- Season: 2001
- Champions: ASC Jeanne d'Arc
- Runner up: ASEC Ndiambour
- Promoted: ASFA Dakar; Dakar Université Club; Casa Sport; Stade de Mbour
- Relegated: Casa Sport; ASC Niayès-Pikine
- Matches: 182
- Goals: 221 (1.21 per match)
- Top goalscorer: (Senegal) Cheikh Ndiaye (11)

The 2000-01 Division 1 season was the 36th of the competition of the first-tier football in Senegal. The tournament was organized by the Senegalese Football Federation. The season began on 11 November and finished on 24 June 2000. ASC Jeanne d'Arc won the eighth title and participated in the 2002 CAF Champions League the following year. ASEC Ndiambour participated in the 2002 CAF Cup of Cups and SONACOS in the 2002 CAF Winners' Cup.

The season would again feature fourteen clubs.

ASC Diaraf was the defending team of the title. The season featured 182 matches and scored 221 goals, more than last season.

== Participating clubs ==
- US Gorée
- Compagnie sucrière sénégalaise (Senegalese Sugar Company)
- ASC Port Autonome
- AS Douanes
- ASC Jeanne d'Arc
- ASFA Dakar
- Casa Sport
- ASC Niayès-Pikine
- ASC Diaraf
- US Rail
- Dakar Université Club
- SONACOS
- ASEC Ndiambour
- Stade de Mbour

== Overview ==
The league was contested by 14 teams with ASC Jeanne d'Arc winning the championship.

== League standings ==
Pos	Team	Pld	W	D	L	GF	GA	GD	Pts
1	ASC Jeanne d'Arc	26	13	8	5	22	6	+16	47
2	ASEC Ndiambour	26	11	12	3	23	9	+14	45
3	US Gorée	26	12	8	6	21	16	+5	44
4	ASC Diaraf	26	10	11	5	22	12	+10	41
5	ASC Port Autonome	26	7	15	4	14	11	+3	36
6	Stade de Mbour	26	7	11	8	18	17	+1	32
7	AS Douanes	26	6	14	6	13	13	0	33
8	ASFA Dakar	26	6	13	7	17	19	-2	31
9	Compagnie sucrière sénegalaise	26	5	15	6	9	10	-1	30
10	SONACOS	26	7	9	10	15	18	-3	30
11	Dakar Université Club	26	6	10	10	15	19	-4	28
12	US Rail	26	4	14	8	11	23	-12	26
13	Casa Sport	26	3	13	10	12	25	-13	22
14	ASC Niayès-Pikine	26	3	11	12	9	23	-14	20

2000 CAF Champions League
2000 Cup of Cups
2000 CAF Winner's Cup
Relegation to Division 2

Division 1 2000-01
Champions
ASC Jeanne d'Arc
8th title
