= Pape Thiaw =

Senegalese football manager (born 1981)

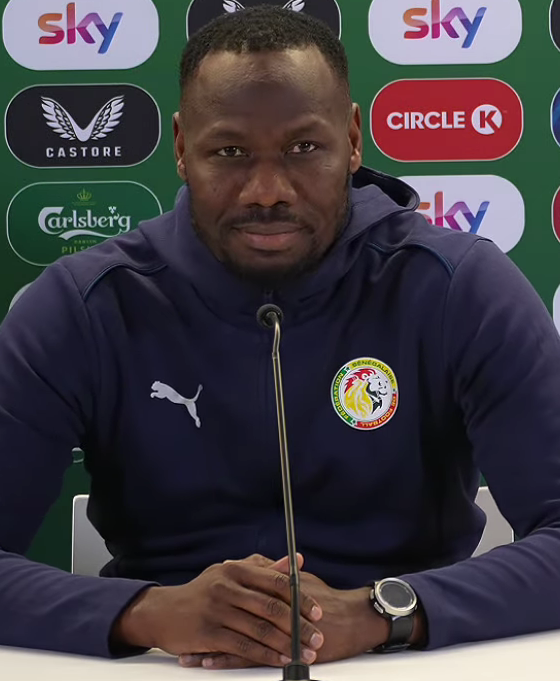
- Thiaw in 2025

Personal information
- Full name: Pape Bouna Thiaw
- Date of birth: 5 February 1981 (age 45)
- Place of birth: Dakar, Senegal
- Height: 1.87 m (6 ft 2 in)
- Position: Forward

Senior career*
Years	Team	Apps	(Gls)
1997–1998	Yeggo		
1997–1999	Saint-Étienne B	8	(3)
1998–1999	Saint-Étienne	1	(0)
1999	SR Delémont	4	(0)
1999–2000	Istres	30	(6)
2000–2001	Lausanne-Sport	32	(11)
2001–2002	Strasbourg	9	(1)
2002	→ Dynamo Moscow (loan)	6	(1)
2002–2003	Lausanne-Sport	7	(4)
2003–2004	Metz	26	(6)
2004–2007	Deportivo Alavés	25	(11)
2007	→ Lorca (loan)	8	(0)
2007–2008	US Créteil	15	(8)
2009	Atlético Ciudad	11	(7)
2010–2011	Jaraaf		
2011–2013	Niarry Tally	7+	(2+)
2013	USS Tamponnaise	0	(0)
2014–2015	FC Ligne Paradis		

International career
2001–2003	Senegal	16	(5)

Managerial career
- 2018–2021: Niarry Tally
- 2022–2024: Senegal A'
- 2024–2026: Senegal
Medal record
Men's football
Representing Senegal (as manager)
Africa Cup of Nations
Runner-up	2025
- * Club domestic league appearances and goals

Pape Bouna Thiaw (born 5 February 1981) is a Senegalese football manager and a former player who played as a forward. He most recently served as the head coach of the Senegal national football team.

== Playing career ==
He played for several clubs in France, Switzerland and Spain, as well as Dynamo Moscow in Russia on a six-month loan from Strasbourg.

He played for Senegal national football team and was a participant at the 2002 FIFA World Cup. He scored 5 goals for his country.

In 2008, while playing for US Créteil in France, Thiaw was reported to have been placed under a mandat de dépôt (detention warrant) in connection with a domestic violence case. French media reported that he was tried in absentia and accused of breaking his wife’s nose, facing a potential one year prison sentence. He did not appear at the hearing, resulting in an arrest warrant and a firm one year sentence.

== Coaching career ==
Thiaw was the manager of the Senegal A' national team that won the 2022 African Nations Championship. African Nations Championship limits the squads to players from the domestic league. The main Senegal squad that participates in the FIFA World Cup and Africa Cup of Nations and includes players from the foreign clubs was managed by Aliou Cissé. Thiaw was appointed coach of the Senegal national football team on 13 December 2024, following the latter dismissal two month before.

In October 2025, he led Senegal to qualify to the 2026 FIFA World Cup. In January 2026, Thiaw coached Senegal to at the 2025 Africa Cup of Nations. During the AFCON final, he urged his players to leave the field in protest after the referee awarded Morocco a penalty in stoppage time, which prompted disciplinary proceedings against him after the match. This led to him being banned for five games and fined $100,000 for "unsporting conduct" and "bringing the game into disrepute" by the Confederation of African Football. He led Senegal to reach the knockout stage of the 2026 FIFA World Cup before they were eliminated by Belgium in a 3–2 defeat after extra time. He was subsequently dismissed along with his coaching staff following the tournament. He was replaced by Patrick Vieira in August 2026.

== Career statistics ==
=== International ===
Appearances and goals by national team and year
National team	Year	Apps	Goals
Senegal	2001	10	5
Senegal	2002	5	0
Senegal	2003	1	0
Total		16	5

Scores and results list Senegal's goal tally first, score column indicates score after each Thiaw goal.

List of international goals scored by Pape Thiaw
No.	Date	Venue	Opponent	Score	Result	Competition	Ref.
1	13 January 2001	Nakivubo Stadium, Kampala, Uganda	Uganda	1–0	1–1	2002 Africa Cup of Nations qualification	
2	21 July 2001	Independence Stadium, Windhoek, Namibia	Namibia	1–0	5–0	2002 FIFA World Cup qualification	
3	21 July 2001	Independence Stadium, Windhoek, Namibia	Namibia	3–0	5–0	2002 FIFA World Cup qualification	
4	4 October 2001	Stade Bollaert-Delelis, Lens, France	Japan	2–0	2–0	Friendly	
5	26 December 2001	Stade Léopold Sédar Senghor, Dakar, Senegal	Burkina Faso	1–1	2–4	Friendly	

== Managerial statistics ==
As of 11 July 2026

Managerial record by team and tenure
Team	Nat.	From	To	Record								Ref.
Team	Nat.	From	To	G	W	D	L	GF	GA	GD	Win %	Ref.
Senegal	(Senegal)	2 December 2024	11 July 2026	29	19	4	6	66	21	+45	65.52	
Career Total				29	19	4	6	66	21	+45	65.52	
