= ASCE La Linguère =

Association football club in Senegal

- Full name: Association Sportive et Culturelle La Linguère
- Founded: 14 September 1969; 57 years ago
- Ground: Stade de Linguère; Saint-Louis, Senegal
- Capacity: 8,000
- Chairman: (Senegal) Aboubacar Sadikhe Sy
- Manager: (Senegal) Amara Traore
- League: Senegal Premier League
- 2025–26: 14th
- Website: http://www.asclalinguere.com
Home colours	Away colours

ASCE La Linguère is a Senegalese football club based in Saint-Louis. The club plays in the second division of Senegalese football.. Its home stadium is Stade de Linguère.

Linguère is joint eighth in the number of major honours won in Senegal (five) with ASC Port Autonome of Dakar, Casa Sports of Ziguinchor and Djambars.

== History ==
ASC Linguère was founded 56 years ago after the merger of two clubs, Espoir de Saint-Louis and AS Saint-Louisienne.

Before the merger, Espoir de Saint-Louis won its only title under French rule in 1957. After independence, the club won its only cup title in 1961. AS Saint-Louisienne won its only cup title five years later in 1966.

Up until 1998, when it placed 13th in the national First Division and remained there until 2002, ASC Linguère primarily played in that division. After being first in the Second Division, Linguère continued until two years later when it was 17th in the 2003-04 Second Division. Linguère returned in 2008 after being first again in the Second Division and became professional champion that year. Linguère finished first in group A with 34 points and scored 16 goals and advanced up to the finals. The club faced Casa Sport from Casamance in the southwest of the country. Both matches were scoreless and Linguère scored 4–2 in the penalty shoot-out to win its only championship title in the 2009 season. After the group system finished, Linguère finished 7th in 2013 and 8th in 2013–14. Linguère was 9th in 2014-15 -t he club scored 30 goals which was shared with the champion Douanes. The goal total was second behind NGB ASC Niarry Tally. Linguère finished 4th in the 2015–16 season and scored the most goals (32), one goal more than Diaraf. Linguère competed in the 2016–17 season. Its result was last place two rounds from the second round. It climbed for its survival in Ligue 1, reaching as high as 9th place at the 12th round. Its positions dropped and was 11th from rounds 13 to 21 with the exception of the 18th round where the club was 12th. The club finished 13th. Linguère was in the relegation zone. The Demba Diop stadium crush which occurred in the 2017 Senegalese League Cup final which demoted US Ouakam from Ligue 1 and the national competition. Linguère was relieved from relegation.

Its first appearance in the cup finals was in 1971 when Linguère beat ASC Diaraf of Dakar 2–0. Its second appearance was in 1984, where it played ASC Jeanne d'Arc and lost 1–0 in extra time. Its second cup title was their third appearance in 1988 after defeating Saltiques Rufisque 1–0. Two years later, Linguère defeated ASC Port Autonome, another Dakar club, 1–0 to claim its third cup title. Its next two final appearances were unsuccessful, losing to ASC Diaraf in 1993 (2–0) and to another Dakar club, AS Douanes (3–1), five years later. Tt played the same club in 2007, this time winning the cup title 1–0 after extra time. This was its recent cup final appearance.

=== Continental appearances ===
Espoir de Saint-Louis's only continental appearance was in 1965 when they played Stade Malien from the eastern neighbour of Senegal. The home match was a draw; the away match was lost 4–1.

Its first continental appearance after the 1969 merger was a cup competition in 1989. Linguère played ASF Bobo-Dioulasso of Burkina Faso and lost by the away goals rule. Its second also entered as a second place club and challenged Algeria's ES Sétif. The club won 1–0 in the first leg and lost 7–1 in the second. Its third cup competition was in 1997, as a second place club, against KAC Marrakesh and lost two legs by a goal each. Its recent continental cup challenge was the 2008 CAF Confederation Cup and challenged against ES Bingerville and each had a total of 3 goals. The club won its promotion in penalty shoot-outs 4-2 and next faced CS Sfaxien from eastern Tunisia; tied with a total of four goals, they lost under the away goals rule.

Its first championship title after the merger and foundation of the club was in 2009. Linguère played Casa Sport in the late-October finals and both matches ended without goals. The final match in the home stadium went into penalty shoot-outs and Linguère won 4–2 to claim its only national title. It gave Linguère an entry to the 2010 CAF Champions League, its only entry to the continental championships, and promotion to the first round. In the preliminaries, Linguère played Ghana's Asante Kotoko and two matches were tied 2-2 and defeated them in the penalty shoot-outs with four goals. Next came Mali's Djoliba AC, 2009 winner and whose title dominated about a quarter of the nation's championships. Linguére scored a single goal in one of the two matches and were tied. Linguère lost 3 penalty shoot-out goals to 4 to one of the greatest clubs in Mali.

=== Subcontinental appearance ===
At the WAFU Cup, the club competed in the 1988 edition where it lost in the first round to ASFAG Conakry 4–1 in the first match in June. The second match was scoreless.

== Uniform ==
Home uniform up to 2009
Away uniform to 2009

Its uniform colors are a white clothing with green lining along the collar and the top portion of the sleeves and the rest of the edges, and socks with three green stripes on top for home matches and green clothing with white line edges on top of the T-shirt with white shorts and green socks with three white stripes on top.

Its former uniform colors were purple for home matches and white for away matches.

== Honours ==
- Senegal Premier League: 1

2009

- Senegal FA Cup: 6
  - Espoir de Saint-Louis (before the merger): 1

1961

  - AS Saint-Louisienne (before the merger): 1

1966

  - as ASC Linguère: 4

1971, 1988, 1990, 2007

== League and cup history ==
=== Performance in CAF competitions ===
Espoir de Saint-Louis's results in CAF competition
Season	Competition	Qualification method	Round	Opposition	Home	Away	Aggregate
1964–65	African Cup of Champions Clubs	Senegalese champions	First Round	(Mali) Stade Malien	1–1	4–1	2–5

ASC Linguère's results in CAF competition
Season	Competition	Qualification method	Round	Opposition	Home	Away	Aggregate
1989	CAF Cup Winners' Cup	Senegalese cup winner	First Round	(Burkina Faso) ASF Bobo-Dioulasso	2–1	1–0	2–2
1991	CAF Cup Winner's Cup	Senegalese cup winner	First Round	(Algeria) ES Sétif	1–0	1–7	2–7
1997	CAF Cup	Senegalese cup runner-up	First Round	(Morocco) KAC Marrakech	0–1	1–0	0–2
2008	CAF Confederation Cup	Senegalese Cup winners	Preliminary Round	(Ivory Coast) ES Bingerville	3–0	3–0	3–3 (4-2 pen)
2008	CAF Confederation Cup	Senegalese Cup winners	First Round of 16	(Tunisia) CS Sfaxien	3–2	2–1	4–4 (a)
2010	CAF Champions League	Senegalese champions	Preliminary Round	(Ghana) Asante Kotoko	2–0	0–2	2–2 (4-2 pen)
2010	CAF Champions League	Senegalese champions	First Round	(Mali) Djoliba AC	1–0	0–1	1–1 (3-4 pen)

=== Performance at the WAFU Club Championship ===
ASC Linguère's results at the WAFU Club Championship
Season	Competition	Qualification method	Round	Away	Aggregate		
1988	WAFU Club Championship	Division 1 Runner-up	First Round	(Guinea) ASFAG Conakry	0–0	4–1	1–4

=== National level ===
Season	Div.	Pos.	Pl.	W	D	L	GS	GA	GD	P	Cup	League Cup	AN Cup	Notes	Final Phase
1981	1	13	26	5	11	10	18	24	-6	21					
1984	1	10	26	-	-	-	-	-	-	22	Finalist				
1990-91	1	9	30	17	4	9	19	22	-3	28					
1991-92	1	4	30	13	11	6	19	8	+11	37					
1992-93	1	11	28	-	-	-	-	-	-	29	Finalist				
1995	1B	2	16	7	4	5	9	5	+4	25				Advanced into the Semis	Lost to ASC Diaraf in the semis
1997	1	3	26	-	-	-	-	-	-	43	Finalist				
1998	1	13	26	-	-	-	-	-	-	26					
2001-02	2	1	-	-	-	-	-	-	-	-					
2002-03	1	8	26	7	9	10	20	22	-2	30					
2003-04	1	17	38	11	12	25	19	26	-7	46					
2007	2	1	-	-	-	-	-	-	-	-	Winner				
2008	1A	3	18	7	8	3	18	11	+7	29				Did not advance	Did not participate
2009	1A	1	16	9	7	0	16	3	+13	34		Quarterfinalist		Advanced to the finals	Champion
2010	1A	6	16	5	5	6	10	10	0	20		Quarterfinalist		Did not advance	Did not participate
2010-11	1	4	30	9	18	3	27	20	+7	45					
2011-12	1A	5	14	4	6	4	12	12	0	18				Did not advance	Did not participate
2013	1	7	30	10	14	6	32	25	+7	44					
2013-14	1	8	26	8	9	9	23	28	-5	33					
2014-15	1	9	26	7	12	7	30	33	-3	33					
2015-16	1	4	26	10	8	8	32	29	+3	38					

== Statistics ==
- Best position: First round (continental)
- Best position at cup competitions: First Round of 16 (continental)
- Appearances at the League Cup: 9
- Highest number of points in a season: 46 - national (2005)
- Total matches played at the continental level: 14
  - CAF Champions' League: 4
  - CAF Confederation Cup: 8
  - CAF Cup: 2
- Total goals scored: 14
  - CAF Champion's League: 3
  - CAF Confederation Cup: 11
- Total wins at the CAF Confederation Cup: 3

== Notable players ==
- (Mauritania) Yacoub Ba
- (Senegal) El Hadji Diouf
- (Senegal) Amara Traoré
