= Pape Diop (disambiguation) =

Pape Diop (born 1954) is a Senegalese politician.

Pape Diop or Papa Diop may also refer to:

- Pape Alioune Diop (died 2012), Senegalese football manager
- Papa Malick Diop (1944–2013), Senegalese basketball player
- Pape Malick Diop (born 1974), Senegalese footballer
- Papa Bouba Diop (1978–2020), Senegalese footballer
- Pape Seydou Diop (born 1979), Senegalese footballer
- Papakouli Diop (born 1986), Senegalese footballer
- Pape Moustapha Diop (born 1996), Senegalese basketball player
- Pape Cheikh Diop (born 1997), Senegalese footballer
- Pape Diop (footballer, born 2003) (born 2003), Senegalese footballer
