= Ousmane N'Doye =

Senegalese footballer (born 1978)

Personal information
- Date of birth: 21 March 1978 (age 48)
- Place of birth: Thiès, Senegal
- Height: 1.85 m (6 ft 1 in)
- Position: Defensive midfielder

Team information
- Current team: Wally Daan (assistant)

Youth career
- ACS Thiès
- 1988–1997: Diaraf

Senior career*
Years	Team	Apps	(Gls)
1997–1998	Diaraf		
1998–2002	Jeanne d'Arc		
2002–2004	Toulouse	39	(5)
2004	→ Lorient (loan)	9	(0)
2004	Estoril	12	(3)
2005–2006	Penafiel	27	(7)
2006–2008	Académica	23	(1)
2006	→ Al Shabab (loan)		
2007	→ Al-Ettifaq (loan)		
2008–2009	Vaslui	28	(1)
2009–2011	Dinamo București	52	(10)
2011–2012	Astra Ploiești	26	(5)
2012–2013	Vaslui	28	(2)
2013–2014	Săgeata Năvodari	15	(0)
2014–2016	ASA Târgu Mureș	50	(18)
2016–2017	Cetate Deva		
2018	CSM Târgu Mureș		
Total		309	(52)

International career
2003–2009	Senegal	27	(1)

Managerial career
- 2017: Cetate Deva (caretaker)
- 2025–: Wally Daan (assistant)
- * Club domestic league appearances and goals

Ousmane N'Doye (born 21 March 1978) is a Senegalese former professional footballer who played as a defensive midfielder, currently assistant coach at Senegalese club Wally Daan.

== Club career ==
=== Senegal ===
N'Doye, born on 21 March 1978 in Thiès, Senegal, began playing junior-level football at local club, ACS, and also practiced basketball until he was aged 12 or 13. He then moved to the junior center of Diaraf, a club where he started his senior career in 1997. In 1999, N'Doye joined Jeanne d'Arc with whom he won three Senegal Premier League titles, being considered the best player in the league at one point.

=== France ===
In the summer of 2002, at age 24, N'Doye was transferred by Ligue 2 club, Toulouse where he was wanted by coach Erick Mombaerts. He made a good impression shortly after arriving, helping the team finish the season in first place, thus earning promotion to Ligue 1. His Ligue 1 debut took place on 2 August 2003 in a 1–1 draw against Strasbourg where he provided the assist to Cédric Fauré's goal from a corner kick. He made a total of eight appearances in the competition, scoring two goals in two consecutive 2–1 losses to Ajaccio and Lens, but also received two red cards. Eventually, he returned for the second half of the season in Ligue 2, being loaned to Lorient.

=== Portugal and Saudi Arabia ===
In July 2004, N'Doye went to play in Portugal for Estoril, making his Primeira Liga debut under coach Litos in a 0–0 draw against Rio Ave. He scored three consecutive goals against Porto, Belenenses and Penafiel, leaving the club at the end of the first half of the season due to a conflict with Litos.

N'Doye went for the second half of the 2004–05 season to Penafiel, netting four goals in four victories over Leiria, Sporting Lisbon, Braga and Benfica. He was very appreciated by the club which declared him non-transferable at the end of the season, refusing a €1.5 million offer from newly promoted La Liga team, Alavés. In the first half of the following season, he scored a brace in a 2–2 draw against Paços Ferreira and one goal in another draw against Gil Vicente. Afterwards, N'Doye wanted to leave Penafiel, which agreed to sell him in the middle of the season for a fee around €1 million to Académica where he played under coach Nelo Vingada.

Académica loaned N'Doye for the 2006–07 season to Al Shabab for €500,000 where he worked with coach Humberto Coelho. In the second half of the season he played for Al-Ettifaq. Subsequently, he returned to the Briosa team for the first half of the 2007–08 season, being coached this time by Domingos Paciência. He scored his only Primeira Liga goal for them in a 3–1 away loss to Vitória Setúbal, having a total of 62 appearances with 11 goals in the competition.

=== Romania ===
N'Doye was transferred from Académica to Romanian club Vaslui for €500,000. He made his Liga I debut under coach Dorinel Munteanu on 23 February 2008 in a 3–0 home win over Dacia Mioveni. His first goal in the competition was netted on 15 March when he equalized in the 90th minute, after a counter-attack to earn a 1–1 draw against Oțelul Galați. At the beginning of the 2008–09 season, he formed a successful partnership in the central midfield with Stanislav Genchev, helping the club win the 2008 Intertoto Cup against Neftchi Baku. Thus they qualified for the UEFA Cup where Vaslui defeated 5–1 on aggregate Liepājas Metalurgs, with him and Ghencev scoring two spectacular goals in the first leg, and N'Doye netting his goal from a 30-meter free kick. He also scored in the second leg after making a solo run, entering the penalty box, and scoring with a precise 14 meter-shot. The campaign ended in the following round, Vaslui being eliminated after 1–1 on aggregate on the away goal rule by Slavia Prague.

In January 2008, after N'Doye had a conflict with coach Viorel Moldovan, Vaslui transferred him to Dinamo București for €350,000 where coach Mircea Rednic very much wanted him. On 17 May 2008, he scored a brace in a 3–1 success over Politehnica Timișoara which kept only Dinamo and Unirea Urziceni in the title fight with three rounds before the end of the season, and the latter eventually won it. In 2009 he started to form a partnership in the central midfield with Djakaridja Koné. The team reached the Europa League group stage, in which N'Doye made four appearances, and received a red card in a game against Galatasaray. After scoring five goals in the first half of the 2010–11 season, he left the club due to a conflict with coach Ioan Andone.

In December 2010 Astra Ploiești bought him from Dinamo for €350,000, staying one year with them, scoring five goals in 26 league games. Subsequently, N'Doye returned free of contract to Vaslui, being wanted by coach Viorel Hizo, whom he considered a father figure, having worked together in his first spell there. He scored his first goal for Vaslui on 28 April 2011 in a 2–1 win over his former team, Astra. At the beginning of the 2012–13 season, after Wesley left at Al Hilal, coach Marius Șumudică named N'Doye the team's captain. He led them in the third qualifying round of the Champions League against Fenerbahçe, where, in the second leg, with the score at 1–1, N'Doye missed a penalty kick, leading to the loss of qualification for the next round as the game concluded with a 4–1 defeat.

In the summer of 2013, he signed to newly promoted Liga I club, Săgeata Năvodari. However, N'Doye left them after half a year, moving to Liga II team, ASA Târgu Mureș, which he helped earn promotion to the first league in 2014. In the 2014–15 season, the 36-year-old N'Doye formed a strong partnership in the central midfield with 33-year-old Gabriel Mureșan and in a 1–0 win over Steaua București in October 2014, their aggressive play injured opponents Raul Rusescu and Claudiu Keșerü. Subsequently, they received harsh suspensions from the Disciplinary Commission of the Romanian Football Federation, which were eventually reduced after they made an appeal. By the end of the season, N'Doye was the team's top-scorer, managing a career-best of 12 goals in 23 matches, including three doubles against Ceahlăul Piatra Neamț, Botoșani and CFR Cluj. He helped ASA fight for the title until the last round when they were defeated 2–1 by Oțelul Galați, thus finishing in second place behind Steaua. N'Doye started the following season by having his childhood idol, Dan Petrescu as coach who used him the entire match in the 1–0 victory against Steaua in the Supercupa României. Afterwards, he played in ASA's 3–0 loss to Saint-Étienne in the first leg of the Europa League third qualifying round, having a total of 20 games with three goals in European competitions (including two appearances in the Intertoto Cup). Early into 2016, N'Doye left the club without permission, but eventually returned to complete the campaign, totaling 185 Liga I appearances with 32 goals.

On 12 August 2016, N'Doye signed with Liga III's Cetate Deva where in April 2017 after the dismissal of coach Viorel Tănase, he was the team's caretaker coach. In late September 2018, N'Doye joined amateurs CSM Târgu Mureș for a short while in Liga IV.

== International career ==
N'Doye was considered by coach Bruno Metsu to be part of Senegal's squad for the 2002 World Cup, but he was eventually not selected. He made his debut for the national team on 30 March 2003 under coach Guy Stéphan in a 0–0 draw against Gambia in the 2004 Africa Cup of Nations qualifiers. Stéphan also included him in the final tournament squad, where he played in two group stage draws against Burkina Faso and Mali. The team reached the quarter-finals where they were defeated by Tunisia without N'Doye playing. He played only one game in the 2006 World Cup qualifiers, but then made six appearances with one goal scored in a 5–1 win over Burkina Faso during the successful 2008 Africa Cup of Nations qualifiers. N'Doye was selected by coach Henryk Kasperczak to participate in the final tournament, where he played in a 2–2 draw against Tunisia, as his side failed to progress from their group. Subsequently, he played four games in the 2010 World Cup qualifiers. He made his last appearance for the national team on 1 April 2009 in a 1–1 friendly draw against Iran, having a total of 27 matches with one goal for the Lions of Teranga.

== Career statistics ==
Appearances and goals by national team and year
National team	Year	Apps	Goals
Senegal	2003	2	0
Senegal	2004	3	0
Senegal	2005	1	0
Senegal	2006	3	0
Senegal	2007	8	1
Senegal	2008	8	0
Senegal	2009	2	0
Total		27	1

Scores and results list Senegal's goal tally first. "Score" column indicates the score after each Ousmane N'Doye goal.

#	Date	Venue	Opponent	Score	Result	Competition
1.	8 September 2007	Stade Léopold Sédar Senghor, Dakar, Senegal	Burkina Faso	2–1	5–1	2008 Africa Cup of Nations qualifiers

== Personal life ==
"Ousmane is a good guy. He has the rhythm of music in his blood and I feel safer with him on the field. He is my brother"

— Gabriel Tamaș, former Dinamo București teammate

N'Doye claims that during his childhood, his favorite player was Chelsea's Dan Petrescu and while he was playing football with his friends, he would write the name Petrescu with the number 2 on the back of his shirt, calling his team "Romania", especially after seeing the team's performance during the 1994 World Cup. He eventually got to play in Romania and worked for a while with Petrescu as his coach at ASA Târgu Mureș. During his years spent in Romania, thanks to his charisma and eccentric style, he received considerable media attention, offering entertaining moments in front of the camera such as a spontaneous conversation after a meeting at an airport with actor Florin Piersic.

In April 2015, after a 1–0 away victory of ASA Târgu Mureș against Steaua București which helped his side reach the first position with five rounds before season's end, N'Doye said some ironies against his opponents in front of the cameras:"In one leg I beat them, I didn't practice after the match with CFR, until today. Neither I, nor Muri (n.r. Mureșan), we both played in one leg, because we are injured (...) Give me the number of Andra, Măruță's wife, because she has a song that was like this match: Steaua - Târgu Mureș - "Paper Plane". Paper plane was this match. I also send her a message: Andra, I like your song very much! Măruță, don't be upset! (...) Look what a team we have! We are people of 30 or so years, people say that we are old, but you know how they say: the old hen makes good soup." Shortly afterwards, N'Doye and singer Andra exchanged t-shirts, as he gave her a jersey with his name and number from ASA Târgu Mureș and she gave him a t-shirt and a key ring with her face on them. In the following round, N'Doye celebrated the scoring of a goal in the 6–1 win over Viitorul Constanța by showing the t-shirt, and also appeared with it at the interviews with the reporters after the game. However, they lost the title in favor of Steaua in the final round of the season, and Steaua's players celebrated by listening to the "Paper Plane" song in the changing room, with Fernando Varela impersonating N'Doye in return for the ironies he had made to them.

N'Doye was also a player who was not afraid of showing his emotions, as after Dinamo lost with 3–0 to Slovan Liberec in the first leg of the 2009–10 Europa League play-off, he said in an interview:"If we can beat 4–0? 5–0 we will give them there." Even though he did not play in the second leg, the team fulfilled "The wonder from Liberec" after winning the match with 3–0, qualifying after the penalty shoot-out, and N'Doye was seen crying of happiness after the game. On 31 October 2015, just one day after the Colectiv nightclub fire in Bucharest which killed many people, N'Doye scored the decisive goal of ASA Târgu Mureș's 2–1 win over Concordia Chiajna, and then while crying he showed a t-shirt with the message:"Condoleanțe românilor" (Condolences to the Romanians). He also started to cry while speaking with reporters after the game, saying:"I was affected by everything that happened. Even though I'm talking, I feel like crying because...To see the people on TV today...it was...I prayed for them all day before the game and I promised to score."

His life outside the field attracted considerable attention in Romania, as N'Doye was known for his lateness at team reunions, moments of indiscipline, conflicts with teammates, and for partying in clubs, which included appearances on stage with rappers Puya and Akon. In 2008, Vaslui teammate Marian Aliuță nicknamed him "Osmănescu". He was proud of this nickname, and over his years in Romania, he often joked that he would like to gain citizenship and change his name to "Mihai Osmănescu" because he loved the country so much. In 2010 after scoring a goal for Dinamo in a 2–1 win over FCM Târgu Mureș, N'Doye celebrated by putting on a pink butterfly mask, and claimed he did that to entertain his daughter, earning the nickname "Pink Panther" from his teammates. In the same year, he appeared in the "Be free" video of Smiley's band Radio Killer alongside former Romanian international footballer, Ioan Lupescu and former tennis ATP number 1, Ilie Năstase.

His younger brother, Dame, was also an international footballer. N'Doye, who was a very good friend and teammate of Brazilian Wesley at Penafiel and Vaslui, mentioned in an interview that he would consider naming a future son Wesley.

== Honours ==
Jeanne d'Arc

- Division 1: 1999, 2000–01, 2001–02
- Senegalese Super Cup: 2001

Toulouse

- Ligue 2: 2002–03

Vaslui

- Intertoto Cup: 2008

ASA Târgu Mureș

- Supercupa României: 2015
