= Pape Alioune Diop =

Senegalese football manager

Personal information
- Date of death: 26 September 2012
- Place of death: Thiès, Senegal

Managerial career
- Years: Team
- ASC Diaraf
- ASC Jeanne d'Arc
- ASFA Dakar
- 1982–1986: Senegal

Pape Alioune Diop (died 26 September 2012) was a Senegalese football coach who managed the Senegalese national team at the 1986 African Cup of Nations.

Diop also managed Senegalese clubs ASC Diaraf, ASC Jeanne d'Arc and ASFA Dakar.
