= Stade de Linguère =

Multi-use stadium in Saint-Louis, Senegal

- Location within Senegal
- Location: Saint-Louis, Senegal
- Coordinates: 16.0228°N 16.493°W
- Capacity: 8,000

Tenants
- ASC Linguère; Saint-Louis FC

Stade de Linguère, better known as Stade Mawade Wade is a multi-use stadium in Saint-Louis, Senegal. It is currently used mostly for football matches and serves as a home ground of ASC Linguère of the Senegal Premier League. It is also home to another club known as Saint-Louis FC The stadium holds 8,000 spectators.

Seven continental matches took place at the stadium. The first being the 1989 CAF Winners' Cup, then the 1991 edition took place there, the 1997 CAF Cup took place in the stadium, where Linguère lost the only match at the continentals at home. The fourth and last continental cup competition was at the stadium in 2008 with two matches. The only continental championship matches were held was the 2010 CAF Champions League with two matches.

Linguère's other stadium named Stade Maître Babacar Sèye had the second leg of the 2009 Ligue 1 finals took place at the stadium, where Linguère won their only championship title after winning 2–4 in penalty kicks over Casa Sports of Ziguinchor.
