= AS Pikine =

Senegalese football club

- Full name: Association Sportive de Pikine
- Founded: 1970
- Ground: Stade Alassane Djigo, Pikine
- Capacity: 10,000
- League: Senegal Premier League
- 2025–26: 9th
- Website: www.aspikine.sn
Home colours	Away colours

Association Sportive de Pikine or simply AS Pikine is a Senegalese football club based in Pikine. They play at Stade Alassane Djigo, which has a capacity of 10,000.

== History ==
The earlier club was established in 1921 and was called Niayes-Pikine.

The modern club was established in 1970, first known as ASC Niayes-Pikine up to the 2000s. AS Pikine entered Ligue 1 in 2009. They would win their first national championship and cup title at the same time for the 2013/14 season and headed to participate in the CAF Champions league in 2015 and challenged Étoile Filante de Ouagadougou, a club from Burkina Faso and later into the first round where they lost to USM Algiers from Algeria.

In the 2014–15 season, Pikine did not have a successful season, their continued appearance in Ligue 1 vanished after being inside the relegation zone and placed 13th after ASC Port Autonome with 28 points, 4 wins and a staggering 14 losses.

Pikine first appeared in the 2009 edition, the club came in 2011 and won their only League Cup title after defeating Yakaar 2–1. Their second attempt for their second title vanished after the club lost to Niarry Tally 1–0 in the 2012 league cup season.

== Achievements ==
- Senegal Premier League: 1

2014.

- Senegal FA Cup: 1

2014.

- Coupe de la Ligue: 1

2011.

- Trophée des Champions du Sénégal: 1

2014.

- Senegal Second League (Ligue 2): 1

2009

== League and cup history ==
=== Performance in CAF competitions ===
ASC Pikine's results in CAF competition
Season	Competition	Qualification method	Round	Opposition	Home	Away	Aggregate
2015	CAF Champions League	Senegalese champions	Preliminary Round	(Burkina Faso) Étoile Filante de Ouagadougou	1–0	0–0	1–0
2015	CAF Champions League	Senegalese champions	First Round	(Algeria) USM Algiers	1–1	5–1	2–6

=== National level ===
==== as Niayes-Pikine ====
Season	Div.	Pos.	Pl.	W	D	L	GS	GA	GD	P	Cup	AN Cup	Notes
1981	1	3	26	11	19	5	27	20	+7	31			
1984	1	14	26	-	-	-	-	-	-				
1998	1	11	26	-	-	-	-	-	-	46			
1999	1	8	26	7	12	7	19	21	-2	33			
2000	1	9	22	5	9	8	11	15	-4	24			
2000-01	1	14	26	3	11	12	9	23	-14	20			

==== as AS Pikine ====
Season	Div.	Pos.	Pl.	W	D	L	GS	GA	GD	P	Cup	League Cup	AN Cup	Notes	Final Phase
2009	2	1	22	11	9	2	19	8	+11	42		1/16 final			
2010	1B	6	16	4	7	5	13	11	+2	19		Semifinalist			Did not participate
2011	1	11	30	7	16	7	21	19	+2	37		Winner			
2012	1B	4	14	6	4	4	13	12	+1	22		Finalist			Did not participate
2013	1	3	30	12	13	5	21	12	+9	49					
2013-14	1	1	26	14	7	5	30	12	+18	49	Winner				
2014-15	1	13	26	6	10	10	17	26	-9	28				Relegated into Ligue 2	

== Statistics ==
- Best position: First Round (continental)
- Best position at a cup competition: 1st (national)
- Best position at the League Cup: 1st
- Appearances at the League Cup: 9
- Highest number of points in a season: 49 (national)
