= 2000 Division 1 (Senegal) =

Division 1
- Season: 2000
- Champions: ASC Diaraf
- Runner up: ASC Port Autonome
- Promoted: ETICS Mboro; ASC Cambérène
- Relegated: ETICS Mboro; ASC Cambérène
- Matches: 132
- Goals: 197 (1.49 per match)
- Top goalscorer: (Senegal) Makhète Ndiaye

The 2000 Division 1 season was the 35th of the competition of the first-tier football in Senegal. The tournament was organized by the Senegalese Football Federation. The season began on 9 April and finished on 3 September 2000. ASC Diaraf won the ninth title and participated in the 2001 CAF Champions League the following year. ASEC Ndiambour participated in the 2001 CAF Cup of Cups and ASEC Ndiambour in the 2001 CAF Winners' Cup.

The season would feature only twelve clubs, the following season would return again to fourteen clubs.

ASC Jeanne d'Arc was the defending team of the title. The season featured 132 matches and scored 197 goals, less than last season.

== Participating clubs ==
- US Gorée
- Compagnie sucrière sénégalaise (Senegalese Sugar Company)
- ASC Port Autonome
- AS Douanes
- ASC Jeanne d'Arc
- ASC Cambérène
- ASC Niayès-Pikine
- ASC Diaraf
- US Rail
- ETICS Mboro
- SONACOS
- ASEC Ndiambour

== Overview ==
The league was contested by 12 teams with ASC Diaraf winning the championship.

== League standings ==
Pos	Team	Pld	W	D	L	GF	GA	GD	Pts
1	ASC Diaraf	22	9	10	3	20	9	+11	37
2	ASC Port Autonome	22	9	9	4	21	12	+9	36
3	ASEC Ndiambour	22	10	5	7	23	21	+2	35
4	US Gorée	22	9	7	6	17	16	+1	34
5	ASC Jeanne d'Arc	22	8	8	6	21	13	+8	32
6	Compagnie sucrière sénegalaise	22	8	7	7	21	16	+5	31
7	SONACOS	22	7	9	6	16	13	+3	30
8	AS Douanes	22	7	6	9	16	17	-1	27
9	ASC Niayès-Pikine	22	5	9	8	11	15	-4	24
10	US Rail	22	4	11	7	10	15	-5	23
11	ETICS Mboro	22	4	9	9	12	27	-15	21
12	ASC Cambérène	22	3	8	11	9	23	-14	17

2000 CAF Champions League
2000 Cup of Cups
2000 CAF Winner's Cup
Relegation to Division 2

Division 1 2000
Champions
ASC Diaraf
9th title
