= Antoine Coly =

Senegalese footballer

Tony Coly
Personal information
- Full name: Antoine Coly
- Date of birth: 25 April 1964 (age 62)
- Place of birth: Senegal
- Position: Midfielder

Senior career*
| Years | Team | Apps | (Gls) |
| -1984 | Casa Sports | | |
| 1984-1990 | Club Brugge KV | 5+ | (0+) |
| 1987-1988 | Wavre Sports FC→(loan) | | |
| 1988-1989 | Linfield F.C.→(loan) | | |
| 1992-1993 | Léopold FC | | |
- * Club domestic league appearances and goals

Antoine Coly (born 25 April 1964 in Senegal) is a Senegalese retired footballer.

== Career ==
In 1988, Coly signed for Linfield F.C.
