= Stade Municipal de Richard Toll =

Football stadium in Richard Toll, Senegal

- Location within Senegal
- Location: Richard Toll, Senegal
- Coordinates: 16°27′52″N 15°40′57″W
- Capacity: 10,000

Tenant
- AS Sucrière de La Réunion

Stade Aline Municipal de Richard Toll is a multi-use stadium in Richard Toll, Senegal. It is currently used mostly for football matches and serves as a home ground of AS Sucrière de La Réunion de Richard-Toll (before the company name change, once known as CSS Richard-Toll). The stadium holds 10,000 people.

The 2000 CAF Cup and the 2006 CAF Confederation Cup had half of its matches played at the stadium that featured CSS Richard Toll.
