= Jacob Ba =

Mauritanian footballer (born 1984)

Personal information
- Date of birth: 20 January 1984 (age 42)
- Place of birth: Saint-Louis, Senegal
- Height: 1.84 m (6 ft 1/2 in)
- Position: Midfielder

Senior career*
Years	Team	Apps	(Gls)
2001–2002	Linguère		
2002–2004	Martigues		
2004–2005	Gazélec Ajaccio	26	(3)
2005–2006	Dijon	9	(0)
2006–2007	Tours	20	(0)
2007–2008	Dijon	25	(0)
2008–2009	Gueugnon	8	(0)
2009–2010	Terrassa	11	(0)
2010	Kenitra	2	(0)
2010–2011	Union Royale Namur		
2011–2013	Aurillac FCA		
2013–2014	Angoulême CFC		
2015–2016	Limoges FC		
2016–2017	SO Cholet		
2017–2019	SO Cholet B		

International career^{‡}
2008	Mauritania	4	(0)
- * Club domestic league appearances and goals as of 14:16, 24 December 2013 (UTC) ‡ National team caps and goals as of 14:16, 24 December 2013 (UTC)

Jacob Ba (born 20 January 1984) is a Mauritanian retired professional footballer.

== Career ==
=== Club career ===
Born in Saint-Louis, Senegal, Ba has played club football in Senegal, France, Spain, Morocco and Belgium for Linguère, Martigues, Gazélec Ajaccio, Dijon, Tours, Gueugnon, Terrassa, Kenitra, Union Royale Namur, Aurillac FCA, Angoulême CFC, Limoges FC and SO Cholet.

=== International career ===
Ba made his international debut for Mauritania in 2008, earning four caps in total.
