= Sekou Keita =

Liberian footballer (born 1979)

Personal information
- Full name: Sekou V. Keita
- Date of birth: November 30, 1979 (age 46)
- Place of birth: Nimba County, Liberia
- Height: 1.85 m (6 ft 1 in)
- Position: Striker

Senior career*
Years	Team	Apps	(Gls)
1998–2000	Club Afrique International		
2002–2003	Roza		
2003–2004	Invincible Eleven		
2004–2005	Jeanne d'Arc		
2006	AS Bamako		
2006–2007	FC Olimpia Bălţi		

International career
2005	Liberia	7	(0)
- * Club domestic league appearances and goals as of 13:42, 18 December 2007 (UTC)

Sekou V. Keita (born November 30, 1979) is a Liberian retired professional footballer who last played as a striker for FC Olimpia Bălţi.

== International career ==
He was also a member of the Liberia national football team, earned a total of 7 games in 2005.
