= Pape Mamadou Diouf =

Senegalese footballer

Pape Diouf
Personal information
- Full name: Pape Mamadou Diouf
- Date of birth: 31 December 1982 (age 43)
- Place of birth: Dakar, Senegal
- Height: 1.85 m (6 ft 1 in)
- Position: Goalkeeper

Youth career
- –2001: Jeanne D'Arc

Senior career*
Years	Team	Apps	(Gls)
2002–2007	Jeanne D'Arc		
2007	Montceau Bourgogne	2	(0)
2008	Toulon	2	(0)
2008–2010	Vesoul Haute-Saône	1	(0)

International career
2004–2006	Senegal	4	(0)
- * Club domestic league appearances and goals

Pape Mamadou Diouf (born 31 December 1982) is a Senegalese former professional footballer who played as a goalkeeper.
