= AS Douanes (Senegal) =

Senegalese football club

- Full name: Association sportive des Douanes sénégalaises
- Nickname: Les Gabelous
- Founded: 1980; 46 years ago
- Ground: Stade Demba Diop; Dakar, Senegal
- Capacity: 20,000
- League: Second League
- 2024–25: 4th of 14
Home colours	Away colours	Third colours

AS Douanes is a Senegalese professional football club based in Dakar. The current chairman as of 2016 is Alassane Ndione. Douanes also has the third most number of major honours won in Senegal numbering 14. They won 6 championship and cup titles, a super cup and a league cup.

The club plays at Stade Demba Diop, sometimes they play at Stade Alassane Djigo.

== History ==
The club was founded in 1980. Not long after the foundation, as they were only three tiers at the time, the club went to Division 1 in 1984 and participated there. Their first championship title was won in 1993, their second was in 1997. Douanes won three consecutive championship titles in 2008, the latter two were won in the final phase. The club did not relegated until the 2013 season after finishing last place with 28 points, they spent in Ligue 2 for a season when they achieved the top position of a group and returned to Ligue 1 in the 2014–15 season. They play in the top division the Senegal Premier League in Senegalese football. Their home stadium is Stade Leopold Senghor. In 2014, the club was first place in Group B of Ligue 2. Douanes won their sixth and recent title in 2015, in the same year, they won the league cup and after entering a champion, the super cup and competed in the continentals in 2016.

Recently Douanes finished 12th which was above the relegation level and avoided Douanes from again playing in Ligue 2, they finished with 30 points. In the 2016–17 season, Douanes started off 10th, they were 13th for the next two weeks, their positions were low moderate peaking up to 7th at the 9th round, they were 9th for a few weeks from the 17th round, and finished a little better with 10th place with 29 points, had a win less but two draws more, also they scored 28 goals.

In cup competition, Douane's first appearance at a cup final was in 1986 and defeated ASC Jeanne d'Arc 1–0 to claim their first title. Their second was in 1995 when the club lost 2–0 to Djaraf. Two years later, they won their second cup title after defeating ASC Linguère of Saint-Louis from the northwest 3–1. Douanes went to win four consecutive cup titles in 2005 and the 2005 title was their recent cup win. Douanes first defeated SONACOS (now ASC SUNEOR) Djourbel 4–1 in penalty kicks as the match ended in a goal draw at extra time, in 2003, they defeated ASC Thiés 1–0, Djaraf 2–1 in 2004 and Dakar UC 1–0 in 2005. Douane's last appearance at a cup final was in 2007 where they lost to Linguère 1–0 in extra time.

=== Continental level ===
Douanes' first continental appearance was the 1987 African Cup Winners' Cup where they challenged against Ivory Coast's ASEC Mimosas and lost. Their second was in 1996 and started in the first round with Great Olympics, as that club withdrew, they advanced into the second round and played with Algeria's CR Belouizdad and lost to that club. Douanes made their first championship appearance in 1998 and featured Wallidan FC (as part of the Senegambian derby) of the surrounded neighboring country and defeated that club 2–0, Douanes later defeated CS Constantine from northeastern Algeria and lost to Raja Casablanca in the second round. Their final match at the CAF Cup Winner's Cup was in 2003 and lost to Cercle Olympique from Bamako (commonly known as COB) in the first round. Douanes came in 2004, their fourth cup appearance was their first Confederation Cup appearance, they defeated Angola's interclube and Bamenda from Cameroon, the club lost to Ghana's Hearts of Oak in the Intermediate Round. Douanes' second championship appearance was the 2005 CAF Champions League where they defeated Mali's Djoliba and lost to Tunisia's Sahel. Only Algerian clubs that Douanes faced in the 2006 edition, they defeated Chlef and lost to Hussein Dey in the Second Round, this was Douanes' final continental cup Appearances. They came in their third continental championship in 2007 and challenged with Stade Malien, they won a match, but as they fielded an ineligible player, Douanes was expelled for the whole match. A year later, they came to defeated Burkina Faso's Commune FC in the preliminaries but later lost to Sahel in the first round. In the 2009 edition, Douanes defeated Freetown, Sierra Leone's Ports Authority, but lost to Kano Pillars of Nigeria under the away goals rule scored by a Kano-based club. Seven years later after winning their recent national championship title, they came to the 2016 edition, the club lost to Horoya from Guinea, the home match was scoreless, they lost the away match 0–4.

== Logo ==
Its logo has a black-blue shield-crest, the club name is on the right and on the left is the striped cobra snake.

== Uniform ==
Its uniform colours for games has a peacock blue t-shirt and socks, it has black horizontal stripes with a black stripe in its sleeves and a thin black rim on top of it. In its shorts, it has a light blue stripes. Its socks are blue-black with two light blue stripes. For away or alternate matches, it is coloured red with white horizontal stripes numbering four and has two thin white lines on top of its sleeves with a white rim at the bottom of it, its shorts are dark red with white stripes and has white socks with red stripes. Its third colours has a dark green t-shirt with a chevron coloured yellow and pine green and has yellow stripes on top of its sleeves and the sides of the shirt. It has a tourmaline-turquoise shorts and socks with red stripes. Its clothing are currently supplied by Adidas.

Until 2017, its former uniform colours had a red vertical striped (numbering four) t-shirt and its clothing white. White were used for both home and away. The away/alternate t-shirt had a red v shaped line near the collar.

Home uniform up to October 2017
Home uniform up to October 2017

== Honours ==
- Senegal Premier League: 6

1993, 1997, 2006, 2007, 2008, 2015.

- Senegal FA Cup: 6

1986, 1997, 2002, 2003, 2004, 2005.

- Coupe de la Ligue: 2

2009, 2015.

- Coupe de l'Assemblée Nationale du Sénégal: 1

2015.

== League and cup history ==
=== Performance in CAF competitions ===
ASC Douanes's results in CAF competition
Season	Competition	Qualification method	Round	Opposition	Home	Away	Aggregate
1987	CAF Cup Winners' Cup	Senegalese Cup winners	First Round	(Ivory Coast) ASEC Mimosas	1-4	2-0	1-6
1996	CAF Cup Winners' Cup	Senegalese Cup runner-up	First Round	(Ghana) Great Olympics, w/o^{1}	canc.	canc.	
1996	CAF Cup Winners' Cup	Senegalese Cup runner-up	Second Round	(Algeria) CR Belouizdad	0-0	0-2	0-2
1998	CAF Champions League	Senegalese champions	Preliminary Round	(The Gambia) Wallidan FC	2–0	0–0	2–0
1998	CAF Champions League	Senegalese champions	First Round	(Algeria) CS Constantine	2–1	0–0	2–1
1998	CAF Champions League	Senegalese champions	Second Round	(Morocco) Raja Casablanca	1–0	2–0	1–2
2003	CAF Cup Winners' Cup	Senegalese Cup winners	Second Round	(Mali) Cercle Olympique de Bamako (COB)	0-2	0-1	1–2
2004	CAF Confederation Cup	Senegalese Cup winners	First Round	(Angola) G.D. Interclube	2-1	2-1	3-3
2004	CAF Confederation Cup	Senegalese Cup winners	Second Round	(Cameroon) PWD Bamenda	3-0	2-2	5-2
2004	CAF Confederation Cup	Senegalese Cup winners	Intermediate Round	(Ghana) Hearts of Oak	0-0	0-1	0-1
2005	CAF Champions League	Senegalese Division 1 runner-up	Preliminary Round	(Mali) Djoliba AC	1–0	1–1	2–1
2005	CAF Champions League	Senegalese Division 1 runner-up	First Round	(Tunisia) ES Sahel	0–0	1–3	1–3
2006	CAF Confederation Cup	Senegalese Cup winners	First Round	(Algeria) ASO Chlef	1-0	0-0	1-0
2006	CAF Confederation Cup	Senegalese Cup winners	Second Round	(Algeria) NA Hussein Dey	1-1	0-2	1-3
2007	CAF Champions League	Senegalese champions	First Round	(Mali) Stade Malien	2–0	2–1	3–2^{2}
2008	CAF Champions League	Senegalese champions	Preliminary Round	(Burkina Faso) Commune FC	0–0	3–2	3–2
2008	CAF Champions League	Senegalese champions	First Round	(Tunisia) ES Sahel	3–0	5–0	3–5
2009	CAF Champions League	Senegalese champions	Preliminary Round	(Sierra Leone) Ports Authority	3–1	1–0	3–2
2009	CAF Champions League	Senegalese champions	First Round	(Nigeria) Kano Pillars	1–1	0–0	1–1 (a)
2016	CAF Champions League	Senegalese champions	Preliminary Round	(Guinea) Horoya AC	0–0	0–4	0–4

^{1}Great Olympics withdrew
^{2}Douanes was expelled for fielding an ineligible player in the tournament

=== National level ===
Season	Div.	Pos.	Pl.	W	D	L	GS	GA	GD	P	Cup	League Cup	Super Cup	Notes	Final Phase
1983	2		26	-	-	-	-	-	-	-					
1984	1	12	26	-	-	-	-	-	-	21					
1990-91	1	11	30	6	14	10	26	29	-3	26					
1991-92	1	7	30	8	15	7	22	16	+6	31	Finalist				
1992-93	1	1	28	-	-	-	-	-	-	54					
1995	1B	3	16	6	6	4	8	9	+9	24	Finalist			Did not advance	Did not participate
1997	1	1	26	-	-	-	-	-	-	46	Winner				
1998	1	3	26	-	-	-	-	-	-	39					
1999	1	9	26	7	11	8	17	19	-2	32					
2000	1	8	22	7	6	9	16	17	-1	27					
2000–2001	1	7	26	6	14	6	13	13	+10	33					
2001–2002	1	5	26	8	11	6	15	11	+4	33	Winner				
2002–2003	1	3	26	11	10	5	23	12	+11	44	Winner				
2003–2004	1	2	38	19	12	7	37	16	+21	69	Winner				
2005	1	11	34	9	16	9	29	21	+8	43	Winner				
2006	1A	1	16	7	7	2	16	8	+8	28				Advanced into the Second phase	
2006	1A	1	6	4	2	0	12	4	+8	14				2nd place	
2007	1A	1	16	10	4	2	23	7	+16	36				Advanced to the final phase	
2007	1A	2	10	7	2	1	20	5	+15	23					Champion
2008	1A	4	18	8	8	2	20	9	+11	32				Advanced into the final phase	Champion
2009	1A	6	16	5	5	16	12	10	+2	20	Finalist	Finalist		Did not advance	Did not participate
2010	1A	3	16	5	8	3	13	12	+1	23		1/16 Final		Did not advance	Did not participate
2010–2011	1	8	30	9	12	9	21	21	0	39					
2011–2012	1B	5	14	3	6	5	6	8	-2	15				Did not advance	Did not participate
2013	1	14	30	5	13	12	15	22	-7	28	Winner				
2013–14	2		26	-	-	-	-	-	-	-					
2014–15	1	1	26	11	10	5	30	19	+11	43		Finalist	Winner		
2015-16	1	12	26	7	9	10	23	30	-7	30					
2016-17	1	10	26	6	11	9	28	33	-5	29					

== Statistics ==
- Best position: Second Round (continental)
- Best position at a cup competition: Intermediate Round (continental)
- Best position at the League Cup: 1st
- Appearances at the League Cup: 9
- Appearances at the Super Cup: 2
- Highest number of wins in a season: 19 (national), in 2005
- Highest number of goals in a season: 37 (national), in 2005
- Highest number of points in a season: 69 (national), in 2005
- Total goals scored at a cup final: 9

== Players ==
=== Current squad ===
As of 30 December 2022

Note: Flags indicate national team as defined under FIFA eligibility rules; some limited exceptions apply. Players may hold more than one non-FIFA nationality.

No.	Pos.	Nation	Player
6	FW	SEN	Moussa Sane
9	FW	SEN	Samba Sadio
10	MF	SEN	Chérif Bayo
—	GK	SEN	Mangoné Diouf
—	FW	SEN	Baye War

== Partnerships ==
The club is in exclusive partnership with the French Football club FC Metz. The French coaches of the partner club participate in the training of Senegalese players as well as coaches.

The French Football Club is priority in the purchase of AS Douanes players.
