= AS Sucrière de La Réunion =

Senegalese football club

ASSUR
- Full name: AS Sucrière
- Founded: as Compagnie Sucrière Sénégalaise Richard Toll
- Ground: Stade Municipal de Richard Toll; Richard Toll, Senegal
- Capacity: 10,000
- League: Senegal Premier League
- 2013: 16th, relegated

Association Sportive Sucrière (short form: ASSUR, AS Sucrière, the first r italicized) is a Senegalese football club based in Richard Toll.

== History ==
The club played in the top division in Senegalese football, their position in the later part were largely moderate until 2006 when the group system was in place, the club was relegated to Division 2 and returned in 2008 where they remained until 2013 when they relegated again after the club with the new name finished last, their highest position was fourth.

In cup competitions, CSS played in the Senegal FA Cup and lost the 1994 final to ASC Diaraf, their only appearance in the National Assembly Cup was in 2010 where they also lost the final.

CSS participated in the first ever League Cup in 2009 and advanced up to the Quarterfinals where they lost to Stade de Mbour, a year later, they also advanced up to the Quarterfinals and lost to ASC Diaraf, Senegal's major team.

In 2012, the club was renamed from Compagnie Sucrière Sénégalaise Richard Toll to AS Sucrière du Sénégal.

Their home stadium is Stade Municipal de Richard Toll.

== Squad ==
Note: Flags indicate national team as defined under FIFA eligibility rules; some limited exceptions apply. Players may hold more than one non-FIFA nationality.

No.	Pos.	Nation	Player
7	MF	SEN	Khalifa Ababacar Badiane
10	MF	SEN	Ibrahima Faye
14	MF	SEN	Idrissa Touré

No.	Pos.	Nation	Player
18	FW	SEN	Ameth Kounta
20	FW	SEN	Boubacar Toumany Diop

== League and cup history ==
=== Performance in CAF competitions ===
ASC Diaraf's results in CAF competition
Season	Competition	Qualification method	Round	Opposition	Home	Away	Aggregate
2000	CAF Cup	Division 1 - 3rd place	First Round	(The Gambia) Real de Banjul	1–0	0–1	2–0
2000	CAF Cup	Division 1 - 3rd place	Second Round	(Tunisia) Étoile du Sahel	0–3	1–2	2–4
2006	CAF Confederation Cup	Division 1 - 3rd place	First Round	(Sierra Leone) Mighty Blackpool	2–0	2–1	3–2
2006	CAF Confederation Cup	Division 1 - 3rd place	Second Round	(Tunisia) Espérance ST	0–1	3–0	0–4

=== National level ===
Season	Div.	Pos.	Pl.	W	D	L	GS	GA	GD	P	Cup	League Cup	AN Cup	Notes	Final Phase
1995	1B	4	16	5	8	3	10	7	+3	23				Did not advance	Did not participate
1997	1	11	26	-	-	-	-	-	-	31					
1998	1	14	26	-	-	-	-	-	-	46				Did not relegated due to an uncertain reason	
1999	1	3	26	11	10	5	28	15	+13	43					
2000	1	6	22	8	7	7	21	16	+5	31					
2000-01	1	9	26	5	15	6	9	10	-1	30					
2001-02	1	9	26	5	15	5	16	15	+1	30					
2002-03	1	7	26	6	13	7	13	11	+2	31					
2003-04	1	6	38	13	16	9	29	25	+4	55					
2005	1	3	34	12	13	9	35	24	+11	49					
2006	1A	9	16	3	8	5	11	13	-2	28				Relegated with a loss of 3 points by an unknown reason	Did not participate
2008	2		-	-	-	-	-	-	-	-					
2009	1A	4	16	5	7	4	12	11	+1	22		Quarter-finalist		Did not advance	Did not participate
2010	1A	7	16	4	6	6	14	15	-1	18		Quarter-finalist	Finalist	Did not advance	Did not participate
2010-11	1	13	30	6	12	12	15	26	-11	30					
2011-12	1A	4	14	5	6	3	11	10	+1	21				Did not advance	Did not participate
2013	1	16	30	5	8	17	11	33	-22	23					

== Statistics ==
- Best position: 3rd (national)
- Best position at cup competitions: Second Round (continental)
- Highest number of points in a season: 55 (2003–04 season)
- Highest number of goals scored in a season: 35 (2005 season)
- Total matches played at the continental cup competitions: 8
  - Total matches played at home: 4
  - Total matches played away: 4
  - Total matches played at the continental cup competitions: 8
- Total number of wins at the continental cup competitions: 4
  - Total home wins: 2
  - Total away wins: 2
- Total number of goals scored at the continental cup competitions: 7
  - Total number of goals scored at the CAF Cup: 3
