= Stade de DUC Dakar =

Multi-use stadium in Dakar, Senegal

Stade de DUC Dakar is a multi-use stadium in Dakar, Senegal. It is currently used mostly for football matches and serves as a home ground of Dakar UC of the Senegal Premier League. The stadium holds 2,000 spectators.
