= Papa Malick Diop =

Senegalese basketball player (1944-2013)

Personal information
- Nationality: Senegalese
- Born: 25 October 1944; Dakar, Senegal
- Died: 24 June 2013 (aged 68)

Sport
- Sport: Basketball

Papa Malick Diop (born 25 October 1944 – 24 June 2013) was a Senegalese basketball player. He competed in the men's tournament at the 1968 Summer Olympics and the 1972 Summer Olympics.
