= Casa Sports =

Association football club in Senegal

- Full name: Casa Sports de Ziguinchor
- Founded: 1969
- Ground: Stade Aline Sitoe Diatta; Ziguinchor, Senegal
- Capacity: 10,000
- Chairman: Seydou Sané
- Manager: Demba Ramata Ndiaye
- League: Senegal Premier League
- 2025–26: 8th
Home colours	Away colours

Casa Sports de Ziguinchor is a Senegalese professional football club based in Ziguinchor. They play in the top division in Senegalese football. Their home stadium is Stade Aline Sitoe Diatta. It is the most popular sports club in Casamance, the first four letters of the area gives the name to the club, the short form Casa.

Casa Sport also is sixth in the number of major honours won in Senegal numbering six, shared with AS Police of Dakar and SUNEOR Diourbel.

== History ==
The club was founded in 1960, the year that Senegal was becoming independent and was founded as Foyer de Jeunes de Casamance. In the early 1970s, it was changed to Casamance-Sporting Football Club and was shortened to its current Casa Sports later. In 1985, Casa Sport celebrated its 25th anniversary. In 2009, Casa Sport became a professional club. The club celebrated its 50th anniversary in 2010.

The first title was the Senegalese Cup won in 1979 and the first club from Casamance along with Southern Senegal to win a national title. Casamance went to their second cup final in 1980 but lost. Casa Sport was second place in the 2008 Division 1 season and again in the 2009 season and under the new name Ligue 1. Casa Sport was second placed the Coupe de Parlement or the Parliament Cup in 2008. In 2009, Casa Sport became a professional club. Casa Sport appeared in the first ever Senegalese League Cup where the club reached up to second place in the 2009 season. A year later, they won their first title in 2010. Also in the year, Casa Sport was second place in the 2010 WAFU Cup. Casa Sport won their next cup title in 32 years in 2011. Casa Sport won their only championship title in 2012. In 2013, Casa Sport brought to their only appearance in the continental championships. Later on, Casa Sport won their second and recent League Cup title and was one of the first winners of the Senegalese Champion's Trophy. Casa Sport headed to their fourth cup finals and lost. In 2015 and 2016, they lost both of the cup final matches.

In the 2015-16 Ligue 1 season, Casa Sports finished 5th place and had 36 points, 9 wins and draws and had 8 losses, also Casa Sport scored 29 goals. For the 2016–17 season, Casa Sport started 3rd in the first round, then climbed to the first round, then 5th in the 3rd round and kept to be at the top 5 positions for much of the season. One match was delayed and featured Casa Sports and Guédiawaye at home field, it was originally for October, as the match was banned by local authorities, the match was awarded 3–0 to Casa Sports. For the second time, Casa Sports finished 5th place with 38 points and had an extra win than last season with 10 and had the same losses as last season, Casa Sport also scored 27 goals, two less than last season, but the worst was they conceded 33 goals which was their worst ever at the top flight competition of the century.

Several of the greatest players of the club played in other clubs including FC Metz, Boavista, Sochaux, Bruge, Saint-Étienne, Nantes, Chelsea, Anderlecht, WAC Casablanca and Étoile of Sahel. One of the former players, Athanas Tendeng became manager of the club in the 2010s.

=== Continental competitions ===
In the continental level, their first appearance was in 1980 and faced Bula FC from Guinea Bissau, after defeating that club, the club would later lose to Algeria's MA Hussein-Dey in the second round. As Casa Sport was third place, they entered into the 2008 CAF Confederation Cup and lost to Dolphins Port Harcourt, 1–2 in the away match as the home match was a draw. As Casa Sport was second place, they also qualified into the 2009 CAF Champions League and faced Mali's mighty club, Djoliba AC and lost to that club. After winning their second cup title, the club faced Gamtel in the Senegambian derby in the 2012 CAF Confederation Cup and lost 3–4 in the penalty shootout as two of the matches had a goal each. After winning their recent championship title, they went to the 2013 CAF Champions League and faced Morocco's Moghreb de Tétouan and Casa won with 3–1 in the penalty shootout as two of its matches had a goal each. Casa Sport headed to the First Round and faced Mali's greatest club Stade Malien and would lose to that club. This was Casa Sport's recent appearance at the continental level.

=== WAFU competitions ===
At the subcontinental level, Casa Sport appeared in the 1984 edition and lost to Sekondi Hasaacas, a year later as they were runner up in Division 1, they lost to the club from the neighboring Guinea-Bissau UDI Bissau with a total of 1–3, all in an away match. Casa Sports' greatest appearance was the 2010 WAFU Club Championship where they were runner-up, Casa Sports defeated the Ports from the surrounded neighbor of the Gambia, they advanced to the Third Round and defeated Horoya AC 5–6 in penalty shootouts as both clubs won each of the two matches, Casa Sport went to the semis and defeated AC Semassi from the Togo 0-2 and at the finals, lost to Nigeria's Sharks FC.

== Uniform ==
Its uniform color is white with black socks but a black T-shirt with black sleeve rim is used for home games, all with a two-rowed checkered lining on the right. When there is a same uniform color in some parts of the other club, the other uniform color is red with a checkered sleeve and black socks.

Previous uniforms were colored black for home games with a black-white checkered portion T-shirt and white socks and white with black socks for away games.

Home uniform up to 2011
Visitor's uniform up to 2011
Third colour uniform up to 2011
Home uniform up to 2014
Away uniform up to 2014
Third colour uniform up to 2014

== Logo ==
Its logo colors are green, white, yellow and red.

== Honours ==
- Senegal Premier League: 2

2012, 2022.

- Senegal FA Cup: 4

1979, 2011, 2021, 2022.

- Coupe de la Ligue: 2

2010, 2013.

- Trophée des Champions du Sénégal: 1

2013.

== League and cup history ==
=== Performance in CAF competitions ===
Casa Sports's results in CAF competition
Season	Competition	Qualification method	Round	Opposition	Home	Away	Aggregate
1980	African Cup Winners Clubs	Senegalese Cup winners	Preliminary Round	(Guinea-Bissau) Bula FC	5–1	1–0	6–1
1980	African Cup Winners Clubs	Senegalese Cup winners	First Round	(Algeria) NA Hussein Dey	0–2	1–1	2–3
2008	CAF Confederation Cup	Ligue 1 - Group B - 2nd	First Round	(Nigeria) Dolphins Port Harcourt	1–2	0–0	1–2
2009	CAF Champions League	Ligue 1 - Group B - 2nd	Preliminary Round	(Mali) Djoliba AC, 1–0, 0–4	0–4	1–0	1–4
2012	CAF Confederation Cup	Senegalese Cup winners	Preliminary Round	(The Gambia) Gamtel	1–0	1–0	1–1 (3-4 p)
2013	CAF Champions League	Senegalese champions	Preliminary Round	(Morocco) Moghreb Tétouan	1–0	1–0	1–1 (3-1 p)
2013	CAF Champions League	Senegalese champions	First Round	(Mali) Stade Malien, 1–2, 0–2	1–2	2–0	1–4

=== Performance at the WAFU Club Championship ===
Casa Sports results at the WAFU Club Championship
Season	Competition	Qualification method	Round	Opposition	Home	Away	Aggregate
1984	WAFU Club Championship	Division 1 Runner-up	Preliminary Round	(Ghana) Sekondi Hasaacas	2–1	2–2	2–1 (4–5 p.)
1985	WAFU Club Championship	Division 1 Runner-up	First Round	(Guinea-Bissau) UDI Bissau	0–0	1–3	1–3
2010	WAFU Club Championship	Ligue 1 Group B Runner-up	First round	(The Gambia) Gambia Ports Authority	2–0	0–1	0–1
2010	WAFU Club Championship	Ligue 1 Group B Runner-up	Third Round	(Guinea) Horoya AC	1–0	1–0	1–1 (5–6 p.)
2010	WAFU Club Championship	Ligue 1 Group B Runner-up	Semifinals	(Togo) AC Semassi		0–2	0–2
2010	WAFU Club Championship	Ligue 1 Group B Runner-up	Finals	(Nigeria) Sharks FC		1–0	1–0

=== National level ===
Season	Div.	Pos.	Pl.	W	D	L	GS	GA	GD	P	Cup	League Cup	AN Cup	Notes	Final Phase
1981	1	7	26	6	14	5	22	20	+2	26					
1982	1	1	26	-	-	-	-	-	-	-	Winner				
1983	1	2	26	-	-	-	-	-	-	-					
1984	1	2	26	-	-	-	-	-	-	36					
1990-91	1	6	30	8	18	4	19	14	+5	34					
1991-92	1	10	30	6	16	8	12	14	-2	28					
1992-93	1	14	28	-	-	-	-	-	-	23					
1995	2		-	-	-	-	-	-	-	-					
1996	2		-	-	-	-	-	-	-						
1997	1	13	26	-	-	-	-	-	-	24					
2000	2		-	-	-	-	-	-	-	-					
2000–2001	1	13	26	3	13	10	12	25	-13	22					
2002–2003	2		-	-	-	-	-	-	-	-					
2003–2004	1	11	38	15	7	16	23	22	+1	52	Finalist				
2005	1	5	34	12	11	11	25	27	-2	47					
2006	1B	2	16	5	4	7	13	15	-2	19				Did not advance	Did not participate
2007	1B	3	16	7	7	2	17	9	+8	28	Winner			Advanced into the final phase	3rd place
2007	1B	3	10	3	4	3	8	7	+1	13	Winner			Advanced into the final phase	3rd place
2008	1B	1	18	11	3	4	20	9	+11	36				Advanced into the finals	Finalist
2009	1B	1	16	9	5	2	26	15	+11	32		Finalist		Advanced to the finals	Finalist
2010	1B	2	16	7	5	4	28	13	+15	26		Winner		Did not advance	Did not participated
2010–2011	1	3	30	12	11	7	33	23	+10	47					
2011–2012	1B	2	14	7	4	3	15	6	+9	25				Advanced into the finals	Champion
2011–2012	1B	1	6	3	2	1	5	2	+3	11				Advanced into the finals	Champion
2013	1	6	30	10	14	6	23	15	+8	44					
2013–2014	1	3	26	11	8	7	32	18	+14	31					
2014–2015	1	6	26	11	8	7	22	17	+5	35					
2015-16	1	5	26	9	9	8	29	27	+2	36					
2016-17	1	5	26	10	8	8	27	33	-6	38					

== Statistics ==
- Best position: Second Round (continental)
- Best position at a cup competition: Preliminary Round (continental)
- Best position at the League Cup: 1st
- Appearances at the League Cup: 9
- Appearances at the Super Cup: 2
- Total goals scored at a cup final: 8

== Players ==
=== Current squad ===
As of 1 October 2021

Note: Flags indicate national team as defined under FIFA eligibility rules; some limited exceptions apply. Players may hold more than one non-FIFA nationality.

No.	Pos.	Nation	Player
—	GK	SEN	Ousmane Mané
—	DF	SEN	Bonaventure Mankabo
—	MF	SEN	Pierre Benoît Manga
—	DF	SEN	Boubacar Lamine Diop
—	FW	SEN	Abdou Karim Badji
—	MF	SEN	Alpha Thiam
—	MF	SEN	Pierre Benoît Aubïa Manga
—	FW	SEN	Lamine Fanné
—	MF	SEN	Ismaila Niang
—	FW	SEN	Siaka Sané
—	FW	SEN	Mamadou Ba

No.	Pos.	Nation	Player
—	MF	SEN	Christian Pascal Diatta
—	GK	SEN	Pape Souleymane Sané
—	MF	SEN	Mamanding Kidiera
—	FW	SEN	Moussa Marone
—	FW	SEN	Mouhamadou Moustapha N'Diaye
—	MF	SEN	Hamed Pape Niang
—	FW	SEN	Ismaïla Sény N'Diaye
—	FW	SEN	Siaka Sané
—	DF	SEN	Bonaventure Mancabou
—	GK	SEN	Alioune Badara Faty

=== Notable and former players ===
- Antoine Coly
- Nicolas Jackson
