= Mbour Petite-Côte FC =

Senegalese football club

- Full name: Mbour Petite-Côte Football Club
- Founded: 1986; 40 years ago
- Ground: Stade Caroline Faye; Mbour, Senegal
- Capacity: 5,000
- League: Senegal Premier League
- 2016–17: 7th
| Home colours | Away colours |

Mbour Petite-Côte FC (formerly Touré Kunda Foot-Pro) is a football club from Senegal based in Mbour.

== History ==
=== Before the merger ===
Touré Kunda Foot Pro was founded in 1986. Later, they won their only cup title in 2010, a season later, they participated into the 2011 CAF Confederation Cup as national cup winners.

=== After the merger ===
The club changed its name in September 2014 after a merger of Touré Kunda with other clubs including Keur Madior (N1), Diamaguene (N2), Mbour AC (N2), Océan de Mbour (N2), AJ Saly (N2), ASC Guedj Gui de Saly (N2) and Coumba Thioupan de Popenguine (N2).

In the 2016-17 Ligue 1 season, Mbour Petite-Côte finished 7th place with 33 points. and had 8 wins and 9 draws and 29 goals were scored. In the 2017 cup final, they challenged with Stade de Mbour, the third cup finals with clubs based outside the Dakar Area, the next in six years. Mbour Petite-Côte FC defeated Stade de Mbour with only 1-0 and won their only cup title since the merger, second overall with the former Touré Kunda. Mbour Petite-Côte will appear for the first time since the merger into the 2018 CAF Confederation Cup (second overall with the former Touré Kunda).

Around 2017, Keur Madior split from the club and reformed its own club.

== Logo and uniform ==
Its current uniform are coloured blue for home matches and also features a white rim on top and on its sleeve-shirt edges, shorts and on socks, it is coloured white for away matches with a blue rim on top and on its shorts and socks.

Before the merger into the club, its uniform colors in the early 2010s was blue clothing with a green thick rim on the bottom of the sleeve, used for home matches and white clothing with a blue thick rim on the bottom of the sleeve for away matches.

Home uniform until 2014
Away uniform until 2014

== Squad ==
As of 30 December 2022

Note: Flags indicate national team as defined under FIFA eligibility rules; some limited exceptions apply. Players may hold more than one non-FIFA nationality.

| No. | Pos. | Nation | Player |
|---|---|---|---|
| 30 | GK | SEN | Mamadou Seck |
| — | DF | SEN | Arrange Diatta |
| — | MF | SEN | Mame Birame Gaye |
| — | MF | SEN | Souleye Sarr |
| — | MF | SEN | Oumar Ngala Samb |
| — | MF | SEN | Ibou Séne Diouf |
| — | FW | SEN | Mouhamed Pouye |
| — | FW | SEN | Dieylani Fall |
| — | FW | SEN | Benoit Toupane |

== Rivalry ==
The club's rivalry is Stade de Mbour, the rivalry was brought to the 2017 national cup final. Known as the Mbour rivalry, it recently became one of the rivalries of football in Senegal.

== Honours ==
- Senegal FA Cup
  - Winners (3): 2010 (as "ASC Touré Kounda"), 2017, 2024
- Coupe de l'Assemblée Nationale du Sénégal
  - Winners (1): 2017

== League and cup history ==
=== Performance in CAF competitions ===
==== As Touré Kunda ====
Touré Kunda's results in CAF competition
| Season | Competition | Qualification method | Round | Opposition | Home | Away | Aggregate |
|---|---|---|---|---|---|---|---|
| 2011 | CAF Confederation Cup | Senegalese Cup winners | Preliminary Round | (Sierra Leone) Ports Authority F.C. | 2–1 | 2–2 | 4–5 |
| 2011 | CAF Confederation Cup | Senegalese Cup winners | First Round | (Morocco) FUS Rabat | 2–1 | 2–0 | 2–3 |

=== National level ===
==== As Touré-Kunda ====
| Season | Div. | Pos. | Pl. | W | D | L | GS | GA | GD | P | Cup | League Cup | AN Cup | Notes | Final Phase |
|---|---|---|---|---|---|---|---|---|---|---|---|---|---|---|---|
| 2010–2011 | 1 | 7 | 30 | 10 | 10 | 10 | 26 | 23 | +3 | 40 | Finalist | | | | |
| 2011–2012 | 1B | 6 | 14 | 2 | 8 | 4 | 5 | 7 | -2 | 14 | | | | Did not advance | Did not participate |
| 2013 | 1 | 8 | 30 | 8 | 15 | 7 | 24 | 24 | 0 | 39 | | | | | |
| 2013–2014 | 1 | 11 | 26 | 5 | 13 | 8 | 16 | 22 | -6 | 28 | | | | | |

==== As Mbour Petite-Côte ====
| Season | Div. | Pos. | Pl. | W | D | L | GS | GA | GD | P | Cup | League Cup | SuperCup | Notes |
|---|---|---|---|---|---|---|---|---|---|---|---|---|---|---|
| 2014–2015 | 1 | 7 | 26 | 9 | 10 | 7 | 26 | 21 | +5 | 35 | | | | |
| 2015-16 | 1 | 11 | 26 | 7 | 10 | 9 | 20 | 19 | +1 | 31 | | | | |
| 2016-17 | 1 | 7 | 26 | 6 | 10 | 10 | 24 | 32 | -8 | 28 | Winner | | | |

== Statistics ==
- Best position: 7th place (national)
- Best position at a cup competition: Preliminary Round (continental)
- Best position at the League Cup: 1st
- Appearances at the League Cup: 9
- Appearances at the Super Cup: 1
