= Senegalese League Cup =

- Founded: 2009
- Region: Senegal
- Current champions: Diambars FC (2 titles)
- Most championships: Casa-Sports FC, Diambars FC (2 titles)

The Senegalese League Cup is the knockout tournament of the Senegalese football featuring clubs from Ligue 1 and 2. It was created in 2009 and is organized by the LSFP, the Senegal FA. The winner competes in the Assemblée Nationale Cup, the super cup of Senegal.

== Winners ==
Season	Winner	Score	Runner-up
2009	AS Douanes	2-0 by forfeit	Casa Sport
2010	Casa Sport	2-1aet	ASC Diaraf
2011	AS Pikine	2-1	ASC Yakaar
2012	NGB ASC Niarry Tally	1-0	AS Pikine
2013	Casa Sport	0-0 (3-1 pen)	US Gorée
2014	Guédiawaye FC	1-0	Diambars FC
2015	AS Douanes	3-1	AS Dakar Sacré-Coeur
2016	Diambars FC	3-2aet	AS Dakar Sacré-Coeur
2017	Stade de Mbour	2-1	US Ouakam
2018			
2019	Diambars FC	2-1	Génération Foot
2020			
2021			
2022			
2023	Teungueth FC	0-0 (3-0 pen)	Stade de Mbour
2024			
2025	Wally Daan FC	0-0 (4-2 pen)	AS Pikine
2026	SONACOS	1-1 (4-3 pen)	Diambars FC
