= Diambars FC =

Association football academy in Saly, Senegal

- Full name: Diambars FC de Saly
- Founded: 2003; 23 years ago
- Ground: Stade Fodé Wade, Saly
- Capacity: 2,000
- President: (Senegal) Saer Seck
- Head Coach: (Senegal) Boubacar Gadiaga
- League: Senegal League 2
- 2024–25: 8th
- Website: www.diambars.org
Home colours	Away colours

Diambars FC de Saly is a football academy in Saly, Senegal, which plays in the Senegalese National League 1. It's also a part of Diambars, a non-profit organisation certified by UNESCO.

== History ==
Diambars was founded in 2003 by former footballer Patrick Vieira and other players.

Diambars started at the regional championships, after being the best in regional divisions, Diambars elevated to a professional status in 2009. Diambars came up to the national divisions, then to National 1, Diambars promoted itself to Ligue 2 and in 2011 promoted to Ligue 1 for the first time where they remain into the present day. Their first season was placed in Group A and finished first with 26 points and 8 wins, the goal totals of 18 was shared with Ouakam, the highest. In the final phase, Diambars was placed second behind Casa Sports. In their second season in Ligue 1, they achieved their only championship title for 2013, Diambars finished with 52 points (club record) and had 14 wins and scored the most goals numbering 42. In 2014, they were 9th, Djambars was 4th in the 2015–16 season with 38 points and third in goal scoring numbering 30. Diambars won their only League Cup title for 2016. Diambars made their 6th Ligue 1 appearance in October 2016, Diambars had a rough start for the 2016-17 season starting 13th in the first round, but slowly headed to the top positions, 4th in the 4th round, then 2nd at the 10th round and held it for two weeks, their positions later dropped to 6th at the 17th round and regained it and finished at a slightly better position of 3rd place, behind the newcomer Génération Foot and well known Guédiawaye but a position ahead of the nation's greatest club Diaraf (or Jaraaf). Diambars had 40 points which was a point more than Djaraf and 10 wins and draws.

Diambars' best players of the club especially in its early years included Pape Souaré, Idrissa Gueye, Kara Mbodj, Saliou Ciss, Omar Wade, Badou (Papa Alioune Ndiaye), Vieux Sané and Serigne Kara. Serigné Kara later signed a deal with Tromsø IL on 17 February 2010 and became the first Senegalese (and probably West African) to play both in Tromsø and a team based north of the Arctic Circle. Salou Ciss later signed and played with that club and was the second Senegalese to play with a Tromsø based club.

=== Continental competition ===
The club made its only appearance at the continental Champions League in 2014. There, Djambars played ASFA Yennenga to a 1–1 draw before losing 2–4 on penalty kicks.

== Logo and uniform ==
Its team logo are crimson and black, the footballer (soccer player) is coloured black and its rim edges are in crimson. The letters "Di", "mb", "rs" is coloured black while the two as are in crimson.

Its home uniform color has a red or crimson t-shirt and socks with white rims on top of the sleeves and black shorts with a white rim. Its away uniform are all in white with rims on top of the t-shirt, two around the collar and another two on its sleeves and on its shorts.

Its uniform colors up to around 2014 were a red t-shirt and shorts with blue shorts for home matches and a blue t-shirt and socks with white shorts for away or alternate matches.

Home uniform up to 2014
Away uniform up to 2014

== Honours ==
- Senegal Premier League
  - Champions (1): 2013
- Coupe de la Ligue
  - Winners (2): 2016, 2019
- Coupe de l'Assemblée Nationale du Sénégal
  - Winners (3): 2011, 2012, 2013

== League and cup history ==
=== Performance in CAF competitions ===
- CAF Champions League: 1 appearance

=== National level ===
Season	Div.	Pos.	Pl.	W	D	L	GS	GA	GD	P	Cup	League Cup	AN Cup	Notes	Final Phase
2010–11	2	1	-	-	-	-	-	-	-	-			Winner		
2011–12	1A	1	14	8	2	4	18	8	+10	26			Winner	Advanced into the finals	Finalist
2011–12	1A	2	6	3	1	2	6	4	+2	10			Winner	Advanced into the finals	Finalist
2013	1	1	30	14	10	6	42	25	+17	52			Winner		
2013–2014	1	9	26	8	8	10	28	26	+2	32					
2014–2015	1	4	26	10	9	7	26	18	+8	39					
2015–16	1	4	26	9	11	6	30	23	+7	38		Winner			
2016–17	1	3	26	10	10	6	33	24	+9	40					

== Statistics ==
- Best position: Preliminary round (continental)
- Best position at the League Cup: 1st
- Appearances at Ligue 1: 6
- Appearances at the League Cup: 6
- Appearances at the Super Cup: 3
- Highest number of wins in a season: 14, in 2013
- Highest number of draws in a season: 11, in 2016
- Highest number of goals scored in a season: 42, in 2013
- Highest number of points in a season: 52, in 2013
- Highest goals conceded in a season: 26, in 2014

== Notable players ==
- (Senegal) Joseph Lopy
- (Senegal) Pape Souaré
- (Senegal) Idrissa Gueye
- (Senegal) Kara Mbodj
- (Senegal) Abdoulaye Seck
- (Senegal) Abdou Karim Camara
- (Senegal) Saliou Ciss
- (Senegal) Omar Wade
- (Senegal) Badou
- (Senegal) Vieux Sané
- (Senegal) Mignane Diouf
- (Senegal) Aliou Baldé
- (Senegal) Boubacar Amaséa
- (Mauritania) Amadou O. Diallo
- (Senegal) Dmytro Lezhnov
- (Senegal) Peter Lustig
- (Senegal) Massiré Sylla
