= ASC Niarry Tally =

Senegalese football club

- Full name: Association Sportive et Culturelle Niarry Tally Grand-Dakar Biscuiterie
- Nickname: Les Galactiques
- Founded: 21 February 1981
- Ground: Stade Demba Diop; Dakar, Senegal
- Capacity: 20,000
- Chairman: (Senegal) Mouhamed Djibril Wade
- Manager: (Senegal) Moustapha Seck
- League: Senegal Premier League
- 2013–14: 5th
- Website: www.ngb-ascniarrytally.com
Home colours	Away colours

Association Sportive et Culturelle Niarry Tally Grand-Dakar Biscuiterie is a football club from Senegal. The club is owned by Senegal's biscuit company known as Grand-Dakar Biscuiterie.

The club was founded on 21 February 1981, but the first football played in Grand-Dakar dates back to 1955.

== Uniform ==
Its home uniform features a blue-crimson red T-shirt with opposite colour stripes on its rims going straight with thin white stripes on its sleeves, red shorts and white socks, its away uniform is entirely white but with thick grey sleeve stripes.

Its uniform up to around 2014 were a red-blue T-shirt with the sleeve colours opposite, also it had red shorts and white socks for home matches, its away uniform was white with a red-blue collar on top.

Home uniform up to 2014
Away uniform up to 2014

== Honours ==
- Senegal Premier League: 0

- Senegal FA Cup: 1

2016.

- Coupe de la Ligue: 1

2012.

- Coupe de l'Assemblée Nationale du Sénégal: 1

2016.

- Trophée des Champions du Sénégal: 0

- Super Coupe du Sénégal: 0

== League and cup history ==
=== Performance in CAF competitions ===
Niarry Tally's results in CAF competition
Season	Competition	Qualification method	Round	Opposition	Home	Away	Aggregate
2017	CAF Confederation Cup	Senegalese Cup Winners	Preliminary Round	(Cameroon) APEJES Academy	2–1	1–0	2–2 (a)

=== National level ===
Season	Tier	Pos.	Pl.	W	D	L	GS	GA	GD	P	Cup	League Cup	AN Cup	Notes	Final Phase
2010	1A	1	16	9	5	2	19	9	+1	32		Finalist		Advanced to the finals	Finalist
2010–2011	1	6	30	9	15	6	20	21	-1	42					
2011–2012	1B	1	14	8	4	2	13	7	+6	28		Winner		Advanced into the Second phase	
2011–2012	1B	3	6	2	1	3	6	7	-1	7		Winner		3rd place	
2013	1	8	30	8	15	7	24	24	0	46					
2013–2014	1	5	26	9	10	7	32	25	+7	37					
2014–2015	1	2	26	10	13	3	34	23	+11	43					
2015-16	1	7	26	8	11	7	19	19	0	35	Winner				
2016-17	1	6	26	9	10	7	31	24	+7	37					

== Chairmen history ==
- (Senegal) Lamine Dieng † (up to 2014/15)
- (Senegal) Moustapha Seck (as of the 2016–17 season)
