= ASC HLM =

Senegalese football club

- Full name: Association Sportive et Culturelle HLM
- Ground: Stade de ASC HLM; Dakar, Senegal
- Capacity: 5,000
- Chairman: Modou Mbaye
- Manager: Demba Dieng
- League: Senegal Premier League
- 2025–26: 10th
Home colours	Away colours

Association Sportive et Culturelle HLM is a Senegalese football club based in Dakar. They play in the top division in Senegalese football. Their home stadium is Stade de ASC HLM.

== Achievements ==
- Senegal FA Cup
  - Winners (1): 2012

== Performance in CAF competitions ==
- West African Club Championship (UFOA Cup): 1 appearance

2009 - runners-up
