= ASC Yeggo =

Senegalese football club

ASC Yeggo is a football club from Senegal. They are one of the top-flight football clubs. 3,000 capacity Stade de Ngor is used for their home games.
