= ASFA Dakar =

Senegalese football club

AS Forces Armées
- Full name: Association Sportive des Forces Armées (Dakar)
- Nickname: ASFA Dakar
- Ground: Stade de DUC Dakar; Dakar, Senegal
- Capacity: 10,000
- League: Senegal Premier League

Association Sportive des Forces Armées (Dakar) is a Senegalese football club based in Dakar. They play in the second division in Senegalese football.

In 1971 the team has won the Senegal Premier League.

== Performance in CAF competitions ==
- CAF Confederation Cup:

1972 African Cup of Champions Clubs
1973 African Cup of Champions Clubs
1975 African Cup of Champions Clubs

== Honours ==
- Senegal Premier League: 1971, 1972, 1974
- Tournoi de la Zone II: third place 1970 (as Senegal)
