= Dakar UC =

Senegalese football club

- Full name: Dakar Université Club
- Short name: DUC
- Ground: Stade de DUC Dakar
- Capacity: 2,000
- League: Ligue 2
- 2013–14: Ligue 1, 13th of 14 (relegated)
| Home colours | Away colours |

Dakar Université Club, commonly referred to as Dakar UC or simply DUC, is a Senegalese football club based in Dakar, which competes in the Ligue 2, the second division of Senegalese football.

They used to play in the Ligue 1 until their relegation in 2014.

== Performance in CAF competitions ==
- CAF Confederation Cup: 1 appearance
  - 2005 – Preliminary Round

== Notable players ==
- (Senegal) Boubacar Dialiba
- (Senegal) Lamine Diarra
- (Senegal) Pape Alioune Diouf
- (Senegal) Ibrahima Gueye
