= US Gorée =

- Full name: Union Sportive Gorée
- Nickname: Les Insulaires
- Founded: 1974
- Ground: Stade Demba Diop; Dakar, Senegal
- Capacity: 20,000
- League: Senegal Premier League
- 2025–26: 4th
Home colours	Away colours

Union Sportive Gorée is a Senegalese football club based in Dakar. They play in the top division in Senegalese football. Their home stadium is Stade Demba Diop.

== Achievements ==
- Senegal Premier League: 3

1978, 1981, 1984.

- Senegal FA Cup: 4

1965, 1972, 1992, 1996.

- Coupe de la Ligue: 0
- Senegal Assemblée Nationale Cup: 0
- French West African Cup: 3

1947, 1954, 1955.

== Performance in CAF competitions ==
- African Cup of Champions Clubs: 4 appearances

1966: First Round
1979: Semi-Finals
1982: withdrew in First Round
1985: Semi-Finals

- CAF Confederation Cup: 1 appearance

2007 - First Round

- CAF Cup Winners' Cup: 3 appearances

1976 - First Round
1993 - Second Round
1997 - First Round
