= 2016–17 Senegal Premier League =

Ligue 1
- Season: 2016–17
- Champions: Génération Foot
- Relegated: US Ouakam; US Gorée
- 2018 CAF Champions League: Génération Foot
- Matches: 146
- Goals: 314 (2.15 per match)
- Biggest home win: 2 matches: Niarry Tally 4–0 Casa Sport (22 November 2016); Niarry Tally 5-1 Teungueth (29 December 2016)
- Biggest away win: Guédiawaye 1–4 Douanes (27 November 2016)
- Highest scoring: 2 matches: La Linguère 3-4 Génération Foot (13 November 2016); Jaraaf 5-2 ASEC Ndiambour (26 November 2016)
- Longest winning run: Génération Foot (4)
- Longest unbeaten run: Diambars (12)
- Longest winless run: Gorée (17)
- Longest losing run: Gorée (4)
- All statistics correct as of 8 June 2017 (scoring part and the results below as of 14 May 2017).

The 2016–17 Ligue 1 was the 52nd season of top-tier football in Senegal and the ninth professional season. The season began on 4 November 2016. Gorée are the defending champions.

Génération Foot, a club based in Sangalkam in the east of Metropolitan Dakar (aka the Dakar Urban Area) won their only national championship title for the season and set a new club record of 52 goals and 57 points and will be appearing in the 2018 CAF Champions League in the following season. Overall it is unbeatable to ASC Diaraf's 54 goals scored in a season and their 72 points made in 2003–04 season, Génération Foot's records are one of the highest in Senegalese top flight football competition, but the highest in the professional Ligue 1. Niane was the best scorer for the season scoring a record number of 19 goals. Last two positions were ASC Linguère and US Gorée who was last year's champion, Gorée was relegated. Due to the Demba Diop stadium crush which occurred on 15 June which was not in the Premier League, US Ouakam was demoted from Ligue 1 and ASC Linguère was relieved from their relegation.

The league comprised 14 teams, with the bottom two relegated to the 2018 Ligue 2.

== Teams ==
A total of 14 teams will contest the league, including 12 sides from the 2015–16 season and two promoted from the 2015–16 Ligue 2, Génération Foot and Teungueth.

On the other hand, ASC Suneor and Olympique Ngor were the last two teams of the 2015–16 season and are playing in Ligue 2 for the 2016–17 season. Gorée are the defending champions from the 2015–16 season.

=== Stadiums and locations ===
Locations of the 2016–17 Ligue 1 teams

| Team | Home city | Stadium | Capacity | 2014–15 season |
|---|---|---|---|---|
| ASAC Ndiambour | Louga | Stade Alboury Ndiaye | 3,000 | 10th in Ligue 1 |
| Casa Sports | Ziguinchor | Stade Aline Sitoe Diatta | 10,000 | 5th in Ligue 1 |
| Diambars FC | Saly | Stade Fodé Wade | 2,000 | 4th in Ligue 1 |
| AS Douanes | Dakar | Stade Demba Diop | 15,000 | 12th in Ligue 1 |
| Génération Foot | Deni Biram Ndao | Stade Deni Biram Ndao | 1,000 | Ligue 2 |
| US Gorée | Dakar | Stade Demba Diop | 15,000 | Champion of Ligue 1 |
| Guédiawaye FC | Guédiawaye | Stade Amadou Barry | 5,000 | 6th in Ligue 1 |
| ASC Jaraaf | Dakar | Stade Demba Diop | 15,000 | 2nd in Ligue 1 |
| ASCE La Linguère | Saint-Louis | Stade Mawade Wade | 1,500 | 3rd in Ligue 1 |
| Mbour Petite-Côte FC | M'Bour | Stade Caroline Faye | 5,000 | 11th in Ligue 1 |
| ASC Niarry Tally | Dakar | Stade Demba Diop | 15,000 | 7th in Ligue 1 |
| US Ouakam | Ouakam | Stade Demba Diop | 15,000 | 9th in Ligue 1 |
| Stade de Mbour | M'bour | Stade Caroline Faye | 5,000 | 8th Ligue 1 |
| Teungueth FC | Rufisque | Stade Ngalandou Diouf | 7,500 | Ligue 2 |

== League table ==
| Pos | Team | Pld | W | D | L | GF | GA | GD | Pts | Qualification or relegation |
|---|---|---|---|---|---|---|---|---|---|---|
| 1 | Génération Foot | 26 | 17 | 6 | 3 | 52 | 23 | +29 | 57 | 2018 CAF Champions League |
| 2 | Guédiawaye | 26 | 12 | 8 | 6 | 29 | 22 | +7 | 44 | |
| 3 | Diambars | 26 | 10 | 10 | 6 | 33 | 24 | +9 | 40 | |
| 4 | Jaraaf | 26 | 11 | 6 | 9 | 37 | 27 | +10 | 39 | |
| 5 | Casa Sport | 26 | 10 | 8 | 8 | 27 | 33 | −6 | 38 | |
| 6 | Niarry Tally | 26 | 9 | 10 | 7 | 31 | 24 | +7 | 37 | |
| 7 | Mbour Petite Côte | 26 | 8 | 9 | 9 | 29 | 37 | −8 | 33 | |
| 8 | Ouakam | 26 | 7 | 11 | 8 | 22 | 24 | −2 | 32 | Demoted due to the Demba Diop stadium crush |
| 9 | Stade de Mbour | 26 | 7 | 9 | 10 | 22 | 24 | −2 | 30 | |
| 10 | Douanes | 26 | 6 | 11 | 9 | 28 | 33 | −5 | 29 | |
| 11 | Teungueth | 26 | 6 | 10 | 10 | 24 | 32 | −8 | 28 | |
| 12 | ASEC Ndiambour | 26 | 6 | 9 | 11 | 26 | 41 | −15 | 27 | |
| 13 | La Linguère | 26 | 6 | 8 | 12 | 24 | 32 | −8 | 26 | |
| 14 | Gorée | 26 | 4 | 11 | 11 | 19 | 26 | −7 | 23 | Relegation to 2018 Ligue 2 |

Updated to match(es) played on 8 June 2017. Source: soccerway.com
Rules for classification: 1) points; 2) head-to-head points; 3) head-to-head goal difference; 4) head-to-head goals scored; 5) head-to-head away goals (only if two teams are tied); 6) goal difference

== Positions by round ==
| Leader |
| Relegation to Ligue 2 |

| Team ╲ Round | 1 | 2 | 3 | 4 | 5 | 6 | 7 | 8 | 9 | 10 | 11 | 12 | 13 | 14 | 15 | 16 | 17 | 18 | 19 | 20 | 21 | 22 | 23 | 24 | 25 | 26 |
|---|---|---|---|---|---|---|---|---|---|---|---|---|---|---|---|---|---|---|---|---|---|---|---|---|---|---|
| Génération Foot | 10 | 6 | 7 | 9 | 6 | 6 | 5 | 1 | 1 | 1 | 1 | 1 | 1 | 1 | 1 | 1 | 1 | 1 | 1 | 1 | 1 | 1 | 1 | 1 | 1 | 1 |
| Guédiawaye | 6 | 3 | 8 | 11 | 12 | 13 | 13 | 9 | 8 | 6 | 6 | 3 | 6 | 5 | 2 | 2 | 2 | 2 | 3 | 2 | 2 | | | | | |
| Casa Sport | 3 | 1 | 5 | 2 | 4 | 5 | 3 | 4 | 2 | 3 | 3 | 4 | 5 | 6 | 4 | 3 | 5 | 5 | 5 | 3 | 3 | | | | | |
| Niarry Tally | 3 | 6 | 2 | 3 | 2 | 2 | 6 | 6 | 3 | 7 | 7 | 6 | 2 | 3 | 5 | 5 | 4 | 3 | 4 | 5 | 4 | | | | | |
| Jaraaf | 1 | 2 | 1 | 1 | 1 | 4 | 2 | 3 | 6 | 4 | 5 | 5 | 3 | 2 | 3 | 4 | 3 | 4 | 2 | 4 | 5 | | | | | |
| Diambars | 13 | 11 | 8 | 4 | 3 | 3 | 4 | 5 | 5 | 2 | 2 | 2 | 4 | 4 | 6 | 7 | 6 | 6 | 6 | 6 | 6 | | | | | |
| Stade de Mbour | 10 | 6 | 4 | 6 | 5 | 1 | 1 | 2 | 4 | 5 | 4 | 7 | 7 | 8 | 9 | 10 | 8 | 7 | 8 | 7 | 7 | | | | | |
| Mbour Petite Côte | 6 | 9 | 11 | 12 | 10 | 10 | 11 | 11 | 12 | 10 | 11 | 11 | 9 | 7 | 7 | 6 | 7 | 8 | 7 | 8 | 8 | | | | | |
| Douanes | 10 | 13 | 13 | 10 | 7 | 9 | 10 | 8 | 7 | 8 | 8 | 8 | 8 | 9 | 10 | 8 | 9 | 9 | 9 | 9 | 9 | | | | | |
| Ouakam | 6 | 10 | 10 | 7 | 11 | 11 | 7 | 7 | 9 | 11 | 12 | 13 | 13 | 13 | 13 | 12 | 12 | 11 | 10 | 10 | 10 | | | | | |
| La Linguère | 13 | 14 | 14 | 13 | 13 | 12 | 12 | 12 | 10 | 11 | 9 | 9 | 10 | 11 | 11 | 11 | 11 | 12 | 11 | 11 | 11 | | | | | |
| Teungueth | 1 | 5 | 3 | 5 | 8 | 7 | 8 | 10 | 11 | 9 | 10 | 10 | 12 | 10 | 8 | 9 | 10 | 10 | 12 | 12 | 12 | | | | | |
| ASEC Ndiambour | 6 | 12 | 12 | 14 | 14 | 14 | 14 | 14 | 14 | 13 | 13 | 12 | 11 | 12 | 12 | 13 | 13 | 13 | 14 | 13 | 13 | | | | | |
| Gorée | 3 | 3 | 6 | 8 | 9 | 8 | 9 | 13 | 13 | 14 | 14 | 14 | 14 | 14 | 14 | 14 | 14 | 14 | 13 | 14 | 14 | | | | | |

Updated to match(es) played on 14 May 2017. Source: Soccerway

== See also ==
- 2016–17 in Senegalese football
