= 2008 Division 1 (Senegal) =

Division 1
- Season: 2008
- Champions: AS Douanes (5th title)
- Runner up: Casa Sport
- Promoted: ASC Linguère; CNEPS Excellence
- Relegated: ASC Xam Xam; ASC Renaissance de Dakar
- Matches: 179

The 2008 Division 1 season was the 43rd of the competition of the first-tier football in Senegal. The tournament was organized by the Senegalese Football Federation. The season began in late in the mid year on 26 June and finished late on 23 November. It was the first year they played at a professional level, also it was the final season it was titled "Division", the following year would become a "League" ("Ligue" in French). AS Douanes won their fifth title, the next club to win three consecutive titles. AS Douanes along with Casa Sport would compete in the 2009 CAF Champions League the following season. ASC Diaraf who won the 2008 Senegalese Cup participated in the 2009 CAF Confederation Cup, along with ASC Yakaar after defeating ASC HLM in a Confederation Cup qualification barrage.

The season would feature 20 clubs, two additional clubs from Division 2 added to the total. 178 matches and the playoff system would be restored with only a single final match totaling 179 and 180 with a Confederation Cup qualification match. This was the only season that was done, the number of clubs would be reduced to 18 in the following season along with the total match numbers to 173. The season scored a total of 283 goals, 151 in Group A and 130 in Group B for a total of 280 and three in the finals. Two goals were scored in the qualification barrage.

ASC Linguère and CNEPS Excellence were promoted from Division 2. At the end of the season, Xam Xam and Renaissance de Dakar were relegated into Ligue 2.

AS Douanes again was the defending team of the title.

== Participating clubs ==
- ASC Renaissance de Dakar
- ASC Linguère
- ASC Port Autonome
- AS Douanes
- ASC Jeanne d'Arc
- ASC Saloum
- US Gorée
- Casa Sport
- ASC Yakaar
- ASC Xam Xam
- ASC HLM
- ASC Diaraf
- ASC Thiès
- CNEPS Excellence
- Dakar Université Club
- ASC SUNEOR
- ASEC Ndiambour
- Stade de Mbour
- US Ouakam
- Guédiawaye FC

== Overview ==
The league was contested by 20 teams and two groups, each group contained ten clubs and a final match.

== League standings ==
=== Group A ===
Pos	Team	Pld	W	D	L	GF	GA	GD	Pts
1	AS Douanes	18	8	8	2	20	9	+11	32
2	ASC HLM	18	7	8	3	18	11	+7	29
3	ASC Linguère	18	7	8	3	18	11	+7	29
4	ASC Jeanne d'Arc	18	6	8	4	20	15	+5	26
5	ASC Port Autonome	18	7	5	6	20	16	+4	26
6	US Ouakam	18	4	11	3	13	12	+1	23
7	ASEC Ndiambour	18	5	8	5	13	16	-3	23
8	ASC SUNEOR	18	3	9	6	9	16	-7	18
9	ASC Thiès	18	3	8	7	9	11	2	17
10	ASC Xam Xam	18	2	3	13	11	34	-23	9

=== Group B ===
Pos	Team	Pld	W	D	L	GF	GA	GD	Pts
1	Casa Sport	18	11	3	4	20	9	+11	36
2	ASC Yakaar	18	9	7	2	16	8	+8	34
3	Stade de Mbour	18	8	8	2	15	6	+9	32
4	ASC Diaraf	18	7	8	3	16	11	+5	29
5	US Gorée	18	6	6	6	18	18	0	24
6	CNEPS Excellence	18	6	5	6	14	12	+2	23
7	ASC Saloum	17	3	8	6	12	19	-7	17
8	Dakar Université Club	18	2	8	8	5	12	-7	14
9	Guédiawaye FC	17	3	5	9	4	13	-9	14
10	ASC Renaissance de Dakar	17	2	4	11	10	22	-12	10

Qualification into the final match
Qualification into the 2009 CAF Confederation Cup
Qualification into the Confederation Cup qualification barrage
Relegation to Ligue 2

=== Final phase ===
23 November 2008

AS Douanes	2:1	Casa Sport
M. Diouf 26'; Toupane 84'		A.O. Sow 52'

Stade Demba Diop
Dakar
Referee: (Senegal) Dame Diagne

=== Confederation Cup qualification barrage ===
23 November 2008

ASC Yakaar	1:1 (a.e.t.)	ASC HLM
Kassé 18'		Mbaye 33'
Penalties
	5-4

Stade Demba Diop
Dakar

Division 1 2008
Champions
AS Douanes
5th title
