= 2015–16 in Senegalese football =

Football in Senegal
- Season: 2015–16

Men's football
- Ligue 1: US Gorée
- Ligue 2: Génération Foot; Teungueth FC
- Cup: NGB ASC Niarry-Tally
- League Cup: Diambars FC

The 2015–16 season was the season of competitive football (soccer) in Senegal.

== Diary of the season ==
- 8 November: the 2015-16 Ligue 1 season begins
- 22 November:
  - Gorée took the number one position
  - Niarry Tally lost to Diambars 0–3 which makes up the highest scored matches away, one of five
- 4th round: ASEC Ndiambour took the number one position
- 5th round: Mbour-Petite Côte took the number one position
- AS Douanes competed in the 2016 CAF Champions League
- 6th round: ASEC Ndiambour retook the number one position
- 12th round: Mbour-Petite Côte retook the number one position
- 13th round: AS Douanes took the number one position
- 28 March: ASEC Ndiambour lost to La Linguère 0-3 which makes up the biggest matches scored matches away, one of five
- 10 April: Casa Sport defeated Douanes 4–0 which makes up the highest scored matches at home, one of two
- 24 April: Casa Sport lost to La Linguère 1-4 which makes up the highest scored matches away, one of three
- 7 May: Olympique Ngor lost to Diambars 1-4 which makes up the highest scored matches away, one of three
- 18th round: Casa Sport took the number one position
- 22nd round: Djambars took the number one position
- 12 June:
  - Jaraaf defeated Douanes 4-0 which makes up the highest scored matches at home, one of two
  - Gorée once again took the number one position for the rest of the season
- 19 June:
  - Olympique de Ngor lost to Gorée 0-3 which makes up the biggest matches scored away, one of five
  - US Gorée won their fourth and recent title for the club and qualifies into the 2017 CAF Champions League the following season.
- Niarry Tally won their cup title for Senegal
- Djambars won their only league cup title for Senegal

=== Ligue 1 ===
US Gorée won their fourth and recent title for the club after winning with 42 points. ASC Linguère scored the most goals numbering 32.

Pos	Team	Pld	W	D	L	GF	GA	GD	Pts	Qualification or relegation
1	Gorée (C, Q)	26	11	9	6	25	17	+8	42	2017 CAF Champions League
2	Jaraaf	26	11	6	9	31	26	+5	39	
3	La Linguère	26	10	8	8	32	29	+3	38 (Note: DIA 1-0 LIN; LIN 3-0 DIA)	
4	Diambars	26	9	11	6	30	23	+7	38	
5	Casa Sport	26	9	9	8	29	27	+2	36 (Note: CAS 1-1 GUÉ; GUÉ 0-1 CAS)	
6	Guédiawaye	26	8	12	6	26	22	+4	36	
7	Niarry Tally	26	8	11	7	19	19	0	35	
8	Stade de Mbour	26	7	12	7	20	20	0	33 (Note: SDM 0-0 OUA; OUA 1-1 SDM)	
9	Ouakam	26	6	15	5	21	20	+1	33	
10	ASEC Ndiambour	26	9	5	12	20	28	−8	32	
11	Mbour Petite Côte	26	7	10	9	20	19	+1	31	
12	Douanes	26	7	9	10	23	30	−7	30 (Note: ASC 0-1 DOU; DOU 1-1 ASC)	
13	ASC Suneor (R)	26	7	9	10	17	24	−7	30	Relegation to 2017 Ligue 2
14	Olympique Ngor (R)	26	5	10	11	20	29	−9	25	Relegation to 2017 Ligue 2

Updated to match(es) played on 19 June 2016. Source: soccerway.com
Rules for classification: 1) points; 2) head-to-head points; 3) head-to-head goal difference; 4) head-to-head goals scored; 5) head-to-head away goals (only if two teams are tied); 6) goal difference
(C) Champions; (Q) Qualified for the phase indicated; (R) Relegated

=== Ligue 2 ===
From each group, Génération Foot (Group A) and Teungueth FC (Group B) were Ligue 2 champions of 2015-16.

== See also ==
- 2015 in Senegal
- 2016 in Senegal
- Timeline of Senegalese football
