= 2015–16 Senegal Premier League =

Ligue 1
- Season: 2015–16
- Champions: Gorée
- Relegated: ASC Suneor; Olympique Ngor
- 2017 CAF Champions League: Gorée
- Matches: 182
- Goals: 329 (1.81 per match)
- Biggest home win: 2 matches: Casa Sport 4–0 Douanes (10 April 2016); Jaraaf 4-0 Douanes (12 June 2016)
- Biggest away win: 5 matches: Niarry Tally 0–3 Diambars (22 November 2015); ASEC Ndiambour 0-3 La Linguère (28 March 2016); Casa Sport 1-4 La Linguère (24 April 2016); Olympique Ngor 1-4 Diambars (7 May 2015); Olympique Ngor 0-3 Gorée (19 June 2016)
- Highest scoring: Jaraaf 3–3 Diambars (14 December 2015)
- Longest winning run: Diambars; Jaraaf (4)
- Longest unbeaten run: Diambars (14)
- Longest winless run: Mbour Petite Côte (13)
- Longest losing run: ASEC Ndiambour; Douanes (4)
- All statistics correct as of 19 June 2016.

The 2015–16 Ligue 1 is the 51st season of top-tier football in Senegal and the eighth professional season. The season began on 8 November 2015. US Gorée, an island based club though plays at Dakar's stadium clinched their fourth league title and first since 1984 in the league's final week with a 3–0 road win over last-place Olympique Ngor. In the cup competition, NGB ASC Niarry Tally, winner of the 2015 Senegalese Cup will participate for the first time in the 2017 CAF Confederation Cup the following season. Gorée participated in Ligue 2 and finished second in the previous season, one of the few clubs who was in the top of second-tier competition last season to win a title of a first tier competition in West Africa.

The league comprised 14 teams, with the bottom two, ASC Suneor and Olympique Ngor, relegated to the 2017 Ligue 2. Only four clubs were outside the Dakar area and all are in the western half of the country. A total of 182 matches were played and fewer goals which numbered 333, fifteen lower than lase season. US Gorée had a grand total of 42 points, one less than last season by the previous champion Douanes, ASC Linguère scored the most goals numbering 32. Casa Sports, sixth placed and US Ouakam, eight placed were the same position as last season.

During the earlier and the middle part of the season, some of the clubs reached first place and weeks later in the lower parts and the relegation zone, then a few climbed up again.

== Teams ==
A total of 14 teams will contest the league, including 12 sides from the 2014–15 season and two promoted from the 2014–15 Ligue 2, ASEC Ndiambour and Gorée. On the other hand, Pikine and Port de Dakar were the last two teams of the 2014–15 season and played in Ligue 2 for the 2015–16 season. AS Douanes are the defending champions from the 2014–15 season.

=== Stadiums and locations ===
Locations of the 2014–15 Ligue 1 teams

Team	Home city	Stadium	Capacity	2014–15 season
ASC Suneor	Dakar	Stade Municipal de Diourbel	5,000	3rd in Ligue 1
ASEC Ndiambour	Louga	Stade Alboury Ndiaye	15,000	Ligue 2
Casa Sports	Ziguinchor	Stade Aline Sitoe Diatta	10,000	6th in Ligue 1
Diambars FC	Saly	Stade Fodé Wade	2,000	4th in Ligue 1
AS Douanes	Dakar	Stade Demba Diop	15,000	Champion of Ligue 1
US Gorée	Dakar	Stade Demba Diop	15,000	Ligue 2
Guédiawaye FC	Bouaké	Stade Amadou Barry	5,000	10th in Ligue 1
ASC Diaraf	Dakar	Stade Demba Diop	15,000	11th in Ligue 1
ASC Linguère	Saint-Louis	Stade Mawade Wade	1,500	9th in Ligue 1
Touré Kunda Foot-Pro	M'Bour	Stade Caroline Faye	5,000	7th in Ligue 1
ASC Niarry Tally	Dakar	Stade Demba Diop	15,000	Ligue 1 Champions
Olympique de Ngor	Dakar	Stade de Ngor	3,000	12th in Ligue 1
US Ouakam	Dakar	Stade Demba Diop	15,000	8th in Ligue 1
Stade de Mbour	Dakar	Stade Demba Diop	15,000	5th Ligue 1

== League table ==
Pos	Team	Pld	W	D	L	GF	GA	GD	Pts	Qualification or relegation
1	Gorée (C, Q)	26	11	9	6	25	17	+8	42	2017 CAF Champions League
2	Jaraaf	26	11	6	9	31	26	+5	39	
3	La Linguère	26	10	8	8	32	29	+3	38 (Note: DIA 1-0 LIN; LIN 3-0 DIA)	
4	Diambars	26	9	11	6	30	23	+7	38	
5	Casa Sport	26	9	9	8	29	27	+2	36 (Note: CAS 1-1 GUÉ; GUÉ 0-1 CAS)	
6	Guédiawaye	26	8	12	6	26	22	+4	36	
7	Niarry Tally	26	8	11	7	19	19	0	35	
8	Stade de Mbour	26	7	12	7	20	20	0	33 (Note: SDM 0-0 OUA; OUA 1-1 SDM)	
9	Ouakam	26	6	15	5	21	20	+1	33	
10	ASEC Ndiambour	26	9	5	12	20	28	−8	32	
11	Mbour Petite Côte	26	7	10	9	20	19	+1	31	
12	Douanes	26	7	9	10	23	30	−7	30 (Note: ASC 0-1 DOU; DOU 1-1 ASC)	
13	ASC Suneor (R)	26	7	9	10	17	24	−7	30	Relegation to 2017 Ligue 2
14	Olympique Ngor (R)	26	5	10	11	20	29	−9	25	Relegation to 2017 Ligue 2

Updated to match(es) played on 19 June 2016. Source: soccerway.com
Rules for classification: 1) points; 2) head-to-head points; 3) head-to-head goal difference; 4) head-to-head goals scored; 5) head-to-head away goals (only if two teams are tied); 6) goal difference
(C) Champions; (Q) Qualified for the phase indicated; (R) Relegated

== Positions by round ==
Leader
Relegation to Ligue 2

Team ╲ Round	1	2	3	4	5	6	7	8	9	10	11	12	13	14	15	16	17	18	19	20	21	22	23	24	25	26
Gorée	2	2	1	2	3	4	5	5	8	7	12	11	9	11	12	7	11	3	3	6	4	3	4	2	1	1
Jaraaf	14	11	13	13	11	6	10	10	5	9	9	12	10	10	13	8	13	13	7	5	7	9	7	7	3	2
La Linguère	1	1	4	3	6	10	7	12	13	13	13	10	14	14	10	5	6	7	5	3	3	4	6	3	6	3
Diambars	8	11	7	7	10	13	8	9	12	12	14	14	13	13	14	11	5	5	4	2	2	1	1	1	2	4
Casa Sport	10	14	11	11	5	5	6	4	4	2	3	6	6	5	4	2	2	1	1	1	1	2	2	5	4	5
Guédiawaye	2	8	8	9	9	9	3	3	3	4	5	7	7	12	6	9	4	4	9	4	5	5	5	4	5	6
Niarry Tally	2	4	10	10	12	12	13	14	14	14	10	13	11	4	7	10	10	11	6	7	6	6	3	6	7	7
Stade de Mbour	6	3	5	6	2	3	4	6	9	5	2	2	5	2	2	3	7	6	10	9	10	7	8	8	8	8
Ouakam	8	9	5	8	8	8	9	11	6	8	8	8	8	6	5	3	3	8	8	10	11	11	12	12	10	9
ASEC Ndiambour	10	6	2	1	4	1	1	1	1	1	4	5	2	3	3	6	9	9	12	12	13	13	13	13	13	10
Mbour Petite Côte	10	7	3	3	1	2	2	2	2	3	1	4	4	9	9	14	14	14	14	14	12	12	9	11	9	11
Douanes	2	5	8	5	7	7	11	7	7	10	6	1	1	1	1	1	1	2	2	8	8	8	10	9	11	12
ASC Suneor	10	13	14	14	13	14	14	13	10	11	11	9	12	8	11	13	8	10	11	11	9	10	11	10	12	13
Olympique Ngor	6	9	12	12	14	11	12	8	11	6	7	3	3	7	8	12	12	12	13	13	14	14	14	14	14	14

Updated to match(es) played on 19 June 2016. Source: Soccerway

Ligue 1 2015-16
champions

4th title

== See also ==
- 2015–16 in Senegalese football
