= 2009 Ligue 2 (Senegal) =

Ligue 2
- Season: 2009
- Promoted: AS Pikine; ASC Niarry Tally
- Relegated: ASC Xam Xam
- Matches: 132
- Goals: 241 (1.83 per match)

The 2009 Ligue 2 season was the first of the professional competition of the second-tier football in Senegal. The tournament was organized by the Senegalese Football Federation The season began a little earlier on Saturday 2 May and finished on 16 October. It was the first season labelled as a "League" ("Ligue" in French). AS Pikine and ASC Niarry Tally were promoted into Ligue 1 the following season while ASC Xam Xam was relegated into National 1 the following season. Pikine had the highest with 42 points while ASC Niarry Tally was second with 40 points, scoring the most goals, numbering 32.

Geographically almost all clubs were in the western and westernmost parts of the country, two or three of the clubs were not of the Dakar area.

Unlike Ligue 1, there was no group system used in the season, the following year, Ligue 2 would have a group system where the club with the highest number of points was elevated into Ligue 1 in the 2011 season and the lowest relegated into National 1 in the 2011 season.

== Participating clubs ==
Club	Location
ASFA Dakar	Dakar
NGB ASC Niarry Tally	Dakar
Diambars FC	Mbour
Diokoul FC	Rufisque
Étoile Lusitana	Dakar
Etics	Mboro
Olympique de Ngor	Ngor
AS Pikine	Pikine
Renaissance de Dakar	Dakar
ASC Touré Kunda	Mbour
ASC Xam Xam	Dakar
ASC Yeggo	Dakar

== Overview ==
The league was contested by 12 teams.

== League standings ==
Pos	Team	Pld	W	D	L	GF	GA	GD	Pts
1	AS Pikine	22	11	9	2	19	8	+11	42
2	ASC Niarry Tally	22	11	7	4	32	17	+15	40
3	ASC Yeggo	22	10	8	4	26	13	+13	38
4	Renaissance de Dakar	22	10	7	5	22	13	+9	37
5	Diambars FC	22	8	11	3	26	15	+11	35
6	Étoile Lusitana	22	7	9	6	18	18	0	30
7	ASC Touré Kunda	22	5	11	6	16	18	-2	26
8	Olympique de Ngor	22	6	7	9	27	35	-8	25
9	ETICS Mboro	22	4	12	6	14	20	-6	24
10	Diokoul FC	22	2	12	8	12	20	-8	18
11	ASFA Dakar	22	3	5	14	12	29	-17	14
12	ASC Xam Xam	22	2	8	12	17	35	-18	14

Qualification into Ligue 1
Relegation to National 1

== Top scorers ==
	Scorer	Club	No. of goals
1	(Senegal) Mamadou Seck	Olympique de Ngor	12
2	Serigne Mbaye	Renaissance de Dakar	10
3	Ebrima Bojang	ASC Yeggo	6
4	Omar Wade	Diambars FC	6
