= Timeline of Senegalese football =

1930s – 1940s – 1950s – 1960s – 1970s – 1980s – 1990s – 2000s

== 1930s ==
1930 – 1931 – 1932 – 1933 – 1934 – 1935 – 1936 – 1937 – 1938 – 1939

=== 1933 ===
- ASC Diaraf (then as Foyer France Sénégal) football club founded in the city of Dakar
- US Gorée football club founded in Dakar

== 1940s ==
1940 – 1941 – 1942 – 1943 – 1944 – 1945 – 1946 – 1947 – 1948 – 1949

=== 1947 ===
- US Gorée won the first French West African Cup

=== 1948 ===
- Foyer France of Senegal (now ASC Diaraf) won their only French West African Cup title

=== 1949 ===
- Racing Dakar (now probably AS Douanes won their only French West African Cup title

== 1950s ==
1950 – 1951 – 1952 – 1953 – 1954 – 1955 – 1956 – 1957

=== 1950 ===
- Espoir Saint-Louis (now part of ASC Linguère participated in the French West African Cup, they failed to win after losing to Racing Conakry (now probably AS Kaloum Star) in the finals
- Djourbel football club founded, it is now known as ASC SUNEOR Djourbel

=== 1951 ===
- ASC Jeanne d'Arc won their first French West African Cup title

=== 1952 ===
- ASC Jeanne d'Arc won their second consecutive and their final French West African Cup title

=== 1953 ===
- US Gorée lost to Jeanne d'Arc of Bamako (now Stade Malien) in the semis

=== 1954 ===
- US Gorée won their second French West African Cup title

=== 1955 ===
- US Gorée won their second consecutive and their final French West African Cup title

=== 1956 ===
- Foyer France Sénégal lost to Jeanne d'Arc of Bamako (now Stade Malien)

=== 1957 ===
- Réveil de Saint-Louis (now part of ASC Linguère) won their only French West African Cup title

=== 1958 ===
- Foyer France Sénégal lost to Africa Sports of Abidjan, Ivory Coast in the semis

=== 1959 ===
- Saint-Louisienne (now part of ASC Linguère) won their only French West African Cup title

== 1960s ==
1960 – 1961 – 1962 – 1963 – 1964 – 1965 – 1966 – 1967 – 1968 – 1969

=== 1960 ===
- Saint-Louisienne (now part of ASC Linguère) lost to Jeanne d'Arc of Bamako (now Stade Malien) in the semis. It was the last Senegalese appearance in French West African Cup and also the last French West African Cup.
- ASC Jeanne d'Arc of Dakar became the first champion of an independent Senegal
- Casa Sports of Ziguinchor founded

=== 1961 ===
- Espoir de Saint-Louis became the first Senegalese cup winner

=== 1962 ===
- ASC Jeanne d'Arc won their first Senegalese Cup title

=== 1963 ===
- US Rail of Thiès won their only Senegalese Cup title

=== 1964 ===
- Olympique Thiès won their first championship title
- US Ouakam won their first Senegalese Cup title

=== 1965 ===
- US Gorée won their first Senegalese Cup title

=== 1966 ===
- Olympique Thiès won their second and last championship title for the club
- AS Saint-Louisienne (now part of ASC Linguère) won their only Senegalese Cup title

=== 1967 ===
- Espoir de Saint-Louis (now ASC Linguère) won their only championship title
- Foyer France Sénégal (now ASC Diaraf) won their first Senegalese Cup title

=== 1968 ===
- Foyer France Sénégal (now ASC Diaraf) won their second championship and cup titles and the last under that name

=== 1969 ===
- ASEC Ndiambour football club founded in Louga
- ASC Linguère founded after the merger of its clubs in the area
- Foyer France Sénégal became the first club to compete at the continental championships then known as the African Cup of Champions Clubs
- ASC Jeanne d'Arc won their second championship and their second cup title
- Foyer France Sénégal changed its name to ASC Diaraf

== 1970s ==
1970 – 1971 – 1972 – 1973 – 1974 – 1975 – 1976 – 1977 – 1978 – 1979

=== 1970 ===
- ASC Niayés-Pikine (now known as AS Pikine) founded in Pikine in suburban Dakar
- ASC Diaraf won their third championship title and the first under the new name along with their third cup title

=== 1971 ===
- ASFA Dakar won their first championship title
- ASC Linguère won their first cup title

=== 1972 ===
- ASFA Dakar won their second championship title
- US Gorée won their second cup title

=== 1973 ===
- ASC Jeanne d'Arc won their third championship title
- ASC Diaraf won their fourth cup title

=== 1974 ===
- ASFA Dakar won their third and last championship title for the club
- ASC Jeanne d'Arc won their third cup title

=== 1975 ===
- ASC Diaraf won their fifth cup title
- ASC Diaraf won their fourth championship title

=== 1976 ===
- AS Police won their first cup title
- ASC Diaraf won their fifth championship title and their second consecutive

=== 1977 ===
- Saltigues Rufisque won their only cup title
- ASC Diaraf won their sixth championship title and their third consecutive

=== 1978 ===
- AS Police won their second cup title
- US Gorée won their first championship title

=== 1979 ===
- Casa Sport won their first cup title
- AS Police won their first championship title
- AS Police won their first National Assembly (super cup) title

== 1980s ==
1980 – 1981 – 1982 – 1983 – 1984 – 1985 – 1986 – 1987 – 1988 – 1989

=== 1980 ===
- AS Douanes football club based in Dakar founded
- SEIB Diourbel (now ASC SUNEOR) won their first championship title
- ASC Jeanne d'Arc won their fourth cup title

=== 1981 ===
- US Gorée won their second championship title
- AS Police won their third and last cup title for the club
- AS Police won their second and last National Assembly (super cup) title

=== 1982 ===
- ASC Diaraf won their seventh championship title
- ASC Diaraf won their seventh cup title

=== 1983 ===
- SEIB Diourbel (now ASC SUNEOR) won their second championship title
- ASC Diaraf won their eighth cup title

=== 1984 ===
- US Gorée won their third championship title
- ASC Jeanne d'Arc won their fifth cup title

=== 1985 ===
- ASC Jeanne d'Arc won their fourth championship title
- ASC Diaraf won their eighth cup title

=== 1986 ===
- AS Douanes won their first cup title
- ASC Jeanne d'Arc won their fifth championship title
- ASC Jeanne d'Arc won their first National Assembly (super cup) title

=== 1987 ===
- ASC Jeanne d'Arc won their sixth cup title
- SEIB Diourbel (now ASC SUNEOR) won their third championship title and last under the name
- ASC Diaraf won their first National Assembly (super cup) title

=== 1988 ===
- ASC Jeanne d'Arc won their eighth cup title
- ASC Jeanne d'Arc won their sixth championship title

=== 1989 ===
- US Ouakam won their second and last cup title for the club
- ASC Diaraf won their eighth championship title
- ASC Jeanne d'Arc won their second National Assembly (super cup) title

== 1990s ==
1990 – 1991 – 1992 – 1993 – 1994 – 1995 – 1996 – 1997 – 1998 – 1999

=== 1990 ===
- ASC Linguère won their third cup title
- UCST Port Autonome won their first championship title

=== 1991 ===
- ASC Diaraf won their ninth cup title
- ASC Port Autonome won their second championship title
- ASC Diaraf won their second National Assembly (super cup) title

=== 1992 ===
- ASC Jeanne d'Arc participated in the 1992 WAFU Club Championship
- US Gorée won their third cup title
- ASEC Ndiambour won their first championship title

=== 1993 ===
- ASC Diaraf won their tenth cup title
- AS Douanes won their first championship title
- Dial Diop disqualified as they forfeited two matches, all matches that Dial Diop took part were annulled

=== 1994 ===
- ASC Diaraf won their eleventh cup title
- ASEC Ndiamnbour won their second championship title

=== 1995 ===
- ASC Diaraf won their twelfth cup title
- ASC Diaraf won their ninth championship title

=== 1996 ===
- ASEC Ndiambour took part in the 1996 WAFU Club Championship
- US Gorée won their fourth and last cup title
- Diourbel as SONACOS (now ASC SUNEOR) won their fourth championship title and the only under the name

=== 1997 ===
- ASC Saloum football club founded after the merger of AS Kaolack and Mbossé-Kaolack
- AS Douanes won their second cup title
- AS Douanes won their second championship title

=== 1998 ===
- ASC Jeanne d'Arc won their and last ninth cup title
- ASEC Ndiambour won their third and last championship title
- ASEC Ndiambour won their first National Assembly (super cup) title

=== 1999 ===
- ASC Yeggo won their only cup title
- ASC Jeanne d'Arc won their seventh championship title
- The 1999 National Assembly edition was cancelled

== 2000s ==
2000 – 2001 – 2002 – 2003 – 2004 – 2005 – 2006 – 2007 – 2008 – 2009

=== 2000 ===
- ASC Port Autonome won their only cup title
- ASC Diaraf won their tenth championship title
- ASC Port Autonome won their only National Assembly (super cup) title
- Diambars FC of Saly founded

=== 2001 ===
- ASC Jeanne d'Arc won their tenth cup title
- ASC Jeanne d'Arc won their eighth championship title
- ASC Jeanne d'Arc won their third and last National Assembly (super cup) title

=== 2002 ===
- AS Douanes won their third cup title
- ASC Jeanne d'Arc won their ninth championship title and their second consecutive
- ASEC Ndiambour won their second National Assembly (super cup) title

=== 2003 ===
- AS Douanes won their fourth cup title and their second consecutive
- ASC Jeanne d'Arc won their tenth championship title and their third consecutive
- ASC Diaraf won their third National Assembly (super cup) title

=== 2004 ===
- ASC Diaraf won their eleventh championship title
- AS Douanes won their fifth cup title and their third consecutive
- ASEC Ndiambour won their fourth and last National Assembly (super cup) title

=== 2005 ===
- AS Douanes won their sixth and last cup title and their fourth consecutive
- ASC Port Autonome won their third and last championship title.
- SONACOS (now ASC SUNEOR) Djourbel won their only National Assembly (super cup) title

=== 2006 ===
- AS Douanes won their third championship title
- US Ouakam won their third and last cup title
- ASC Diaraf won their fourth and last National Assembly (super cup) title

=== 2007 ===
- ASC Linguère won their fourth and final cup title
- AS Douanes won their fourth consecutive championship title and their second consecutive

=== 2008 ===
- ASC Diaraf won their thirteenth cup title
- AS Douanes won their fifth championship title and their third consecutive
- ASC Yakaar won their only National Assembly (super cup) title
- Division 1 becomes a professional competition

=== 2009 ===
- ASC Diaraf won their fourteenth cup title and their second consecutive
- AS Douanes won their first Senegalese League Cup
- ASC Linguère won their first and only championship title after the merger
- Division 1 and 2 became Ligue 1 and 2, the lower three became Nationale 1 and 2

== 2010s ==
2010 – 2011 – 2012 – 2013 – 2014 – 2015 – 2016 – 2017

=== 2010 ===
- ASC Diaraf won their twelfth and last championship title
- Casa Sport won their first league cup
- Toure Kunda Footpro (now Mbour Petite-Côté) won their only cup title
- Stade de Mbour won their only National Assembly (super cup) title

=== 2011 ===
- AS Pikine won their only league cup title
- US Ouakam won their only championship title
- Casa Sport won their second and last cup title
- Diambars FC won their first consecutive National Assembly (super cup) title

=== 2012 ===
- ASC HLM won their only cup title
- ASC Niarry-Tally won their only league cup title
- Casa Sports won their only championship title
- Diambars FC won their second consecutive National Assembly (super cup) title

=== 2013 ===
- ASC Diaraf won their fifteenth and last cup title
- Casa Sport won their second and last league cup title
- Diambars FC of Saly won their only championship title
- Diambars FC won their third consecutive and last National Assembly (super cup) title

=== 2014 ===
- AS Pikine from suburban Dakar won their only cup title
- AS Pikine from suburban Dakar won their only championship title
- Olympique de Ngor won their only National Assembly (super cup) title
- Guédiawaye FC won their only league cup title

=== 2015 ===
- AS Douanes won their second and last league cup title
- Génération Foot won their only cup title
- AS Douanes won their sixth and last championship title
- As a second placed cup winner, Olympique de Ngor competed in the 2015 CAF Confederation Cup
- The National Assembly Cup becomes the Super Cup
- AS Douanes won their only super cup title

=== 2016 ===
- Diambars FC won their only league cup title
- ASC Niarry-Tally won their only cup title
- US Gorée won their fourth and last championship title
- US Gorée won their only super cup title
- US Gorée won their only Champion's Trophy

=== 2017 ===
- Génération Foot won their only championship title, Ligue 1
- Mbour Petite-Côte won their only national cup title
- Stade de Mbour won their League Cup title
- US Ouakam demoted, the club was out of competition as the team took the case to the international football court in Geneva, Switzerland where they won their right to remain in Ligue 1

== See also ==
- Timeline of association football
