= 2020 Senegal shipwreck =

Coordinates: 14.408°N 16.978°W

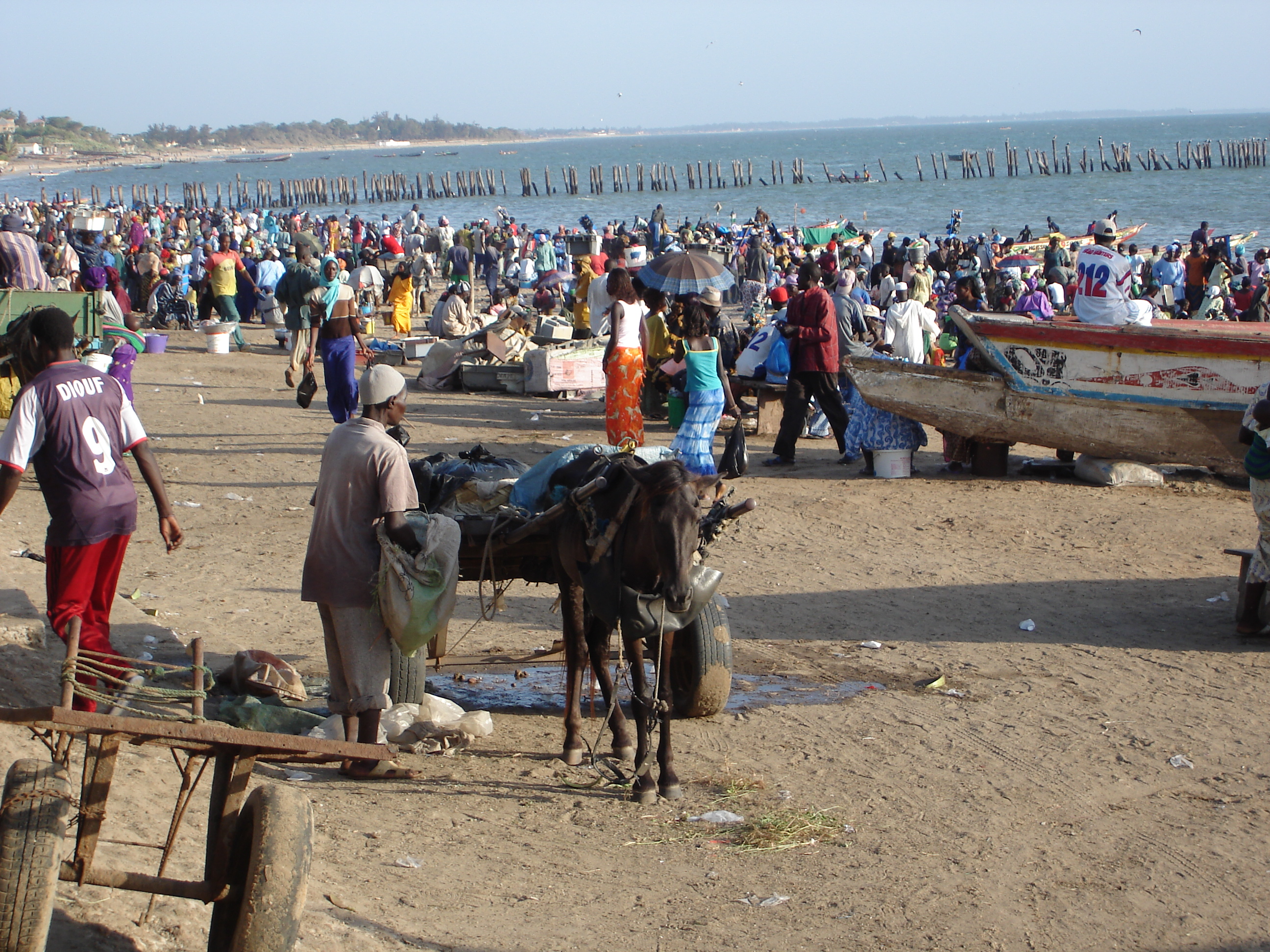
The ship set off from M'Bour, a fishing town in Senegal

On 29 October 2020, a ship which set off from the Senegalese fishing town of M'Bour caught fire and capsized while taking migrants to Spain's Canary Islands. Around 140 people died, and around 60 survivors were saved by the Senegalese and Spanish navies, and civilian fishermen. The International Organization for Migration said it was the deadliest shipwreck of the year.

The wreck came during an uptick in the number of African migrants attempting to reach the European Union by sea to the Canary Islands. Reasons include difficulty of international land travel in Africa due to COVID-19 restrictions, and increased security measures in north Africa; the journey is considerably longer and more hazardous than over the Mediterranean.

Senegal's youth blamed the wreck on the inability of their government to create jobs in their country.
