= 2016–17 in Senegalese football =

Football in Senegal
- Season: 2016–17

Men's football
- 2016–17 Ligue 1: Génération Foot
- Cup: Mbour Petite-Côte
- League Cup: Stade de Mbour

The 2016–17 season was the season of competitive football (soccer) in Senegal.

== Diary of the season ==
- US Gorée won the 2015-16 Senegalese Super Cup
- US Gorée won the 2015-16 Champion's Trophy
- November 5: Both Tenugueth and Jaraaf started off with first place and had three points each, also Tenugueth played their first Ligue 1 match
- November 6: Gorée defeated Stade de Mbour 0-1 and is Gorée's only win to date
- November 13:
  - Génération Foot defeated La Linguère 3-4 and became the highest scoring match, it is now second
  - Diambars made a draw with Mbour Pétite-Côté with a goal and started Diambar's twelve match unbeaten streak
- November 14: Casa Sports took the lead with six points
- November 22:
  - Jaraaf retook the lead and had seven points
  - Niarry Tally defeated Casa Sport 4–0 and was the biggest home win until December 29
- November 26: Jaraaf defeated ASEC Ndjambour 5-2 and became the highest scoring match for nearly six months
- November 27 - Douanes defeated Guédiawaye 1–4 and is currently the biggest away win
- December 14: Match between Casa Sports and Guédiawaye was delayed
- December 15: Stade de Mbour took the lead and had ten points
- December 23: Génération Foot took the lead and had 14 points
- mid-January: All sports competitions including football took a break due to the holy month of Ramadan in the Islamic calendar
- February 19: 2016-17 Ligue 1 season continues
- March 18: Diambars' 12 match unbeaten streak went to an end after a loss to Jaraaf 2-1
- April 1: Ouakam defeated Djambars 2-1 and escaped the relegation zone
- April 2: Ndiambour lost to Linguère 2-1 and put inside the relegation zone
- May 3: The rescheduled match between Casa Sport and Guédiawaye was to be played, the match was forbidden by local authorities, the match was awarded 0-3 to Guédiawaye
- May 7: Génération Foot of Sangalkam reached the 40th point and currently has an eight-point difference over second placed Casa Sport
- May 20: Diaraf defeated Casa Sports 6-0 and made became the highest scoring match of the season
- late-May: Génération Foot became football champions just a few weeks before the end of the season
- June 25: Génération Foot, a club based in Sangalkam located east of Dakar won their only national football championship title
- mid-July: Stade de Mbour won their only League Cup title

== See also ==
- 2016 in Senegal
- 2017 in Senegal
