= Stade de Ngor =

Multi-use stadium in Ngor, Senegal

Coordinates: 14.7468°N 17.5100°W

- Interactive map of Stade de Ngor
- Location: Ngor, Senegal
- Capacity: 3,000

Tenants
- Olympique de Ngor; Almadies

Stade de Ngor is a multi-use stadium in Ngor in the west of Dakar, Senegal. It is currently used mostly for football matches and serves as a home ground of Olympique de Ngor, also Almadies plays at the stadium. The stadium holds 3,000 people.

It is just around a kilometer southeast of the center of Ngor and west of Dakar International Airport, the main airport (or hub) will be about 50 km east of Dakar and it likely becomes a secondary airport.

It is the westernmost sports stadium on the African mainland, Estádio Municipal do Porto Novo (Porto Novo Municipal Stadium) in Cape Verde is the westernmost of the whole of Africa.

The first continental competition took place with one of the two matches of the 2015 CAF Confederation Cup at the stadium with the clubs Unisport de Bafang of Cameroon and Hearts of Oak of Ghana.
