= Demba Diop stadium crush =

2017 disaster in Dakar, Senegal

- Date: 15 July 2017
- Location: Demba Diop stadium, Dakar, Senegal
- Cause: Violence between rival supporters, wall collapse and stampede
- Deaths: 8
- Injuries: 60

The Demba Diop stadium crush occurred on 15 June 2017 at the Demba Diop stadium in Dakar, Senegal. During the extra time of the Senegalese football league final match, supporters from the Ouakam F.C. team threw projectiles at the supporters of the opposing team, Stade de Mbour, causing them to leave their seats en masse. This fracas between the fans resulted in a wall collapsing and the police firing tear gas into the stands. A stampede ensued, leaving eight dead and 60 injured.

Matar Ba, the Senegalese sports minister, confirmed that one of the dead was a child and promised "strong measures" to ensure such incidents would not be repeated. The campaigning for the Senegalese legislative elections, scheduled to happen on 30 July 2017, was temporally suspended in light of the incident.

Senegal's president, Macky Sall, tweeted that those responsible for the incident would be sanctioned.

Comparisons between the crush and the Hillsborough disaster in the United Kingdom have been drawn.
