= Stade Demba Diop =

Sports venue in Dakar, Senegal

- Location within Senegal
- Location: Boulevard Président Habib Bourguiba; Sicap-Liberté, Dakar, Senegal
- Coordinates: 14°42′38″N 17°27′29″W
- Capacity: 20,000
- Surface: Artificial turf

Construction
- Opened: 1963

Tenants
- ASC Jaraaf; AS Douanes; US Gorée; US Ouakam; ASC Xam Xam

Stade Demba Diop is a multi-use stadium in greater Dakar, Senegal. It is situated on Boulevard Président Habib Bourguiba in Sicap-Liberté, an urban arrondissement of Dakar. Several football clubs use this stadium for their home games.

== History ==
Built in 1963, the stadium was later named after Demba Diop, former mayor of M'bour and Minister of Youth and Sport under President Léopold Sédar Senghor. Diop was assassinated on 3 February 1967. In 2017, eight people died after a wall at the Stade Demba Diop collapsed during a match between Stade de Mbour and US Ouakam.

== Facilities ==
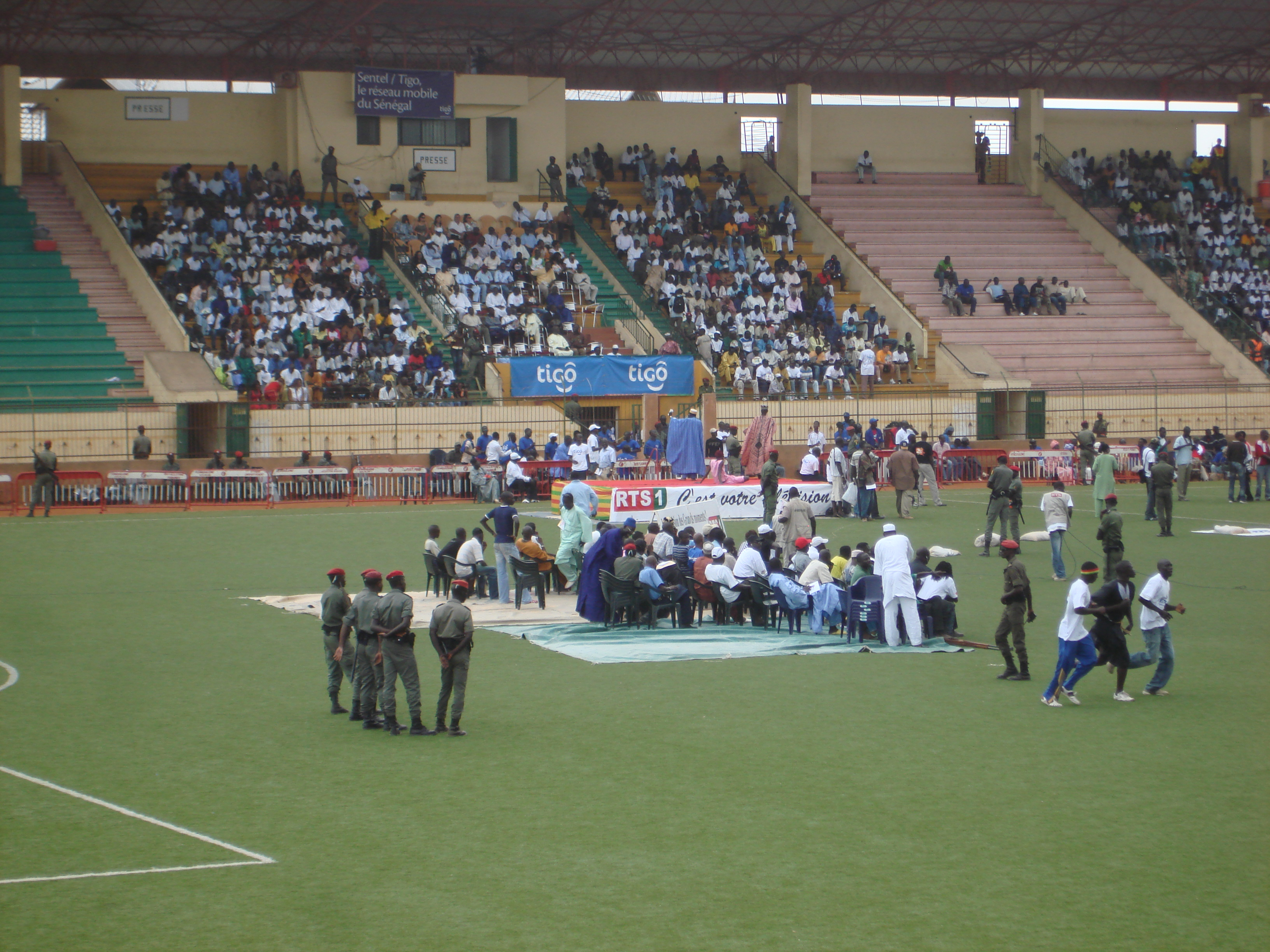
Stands.

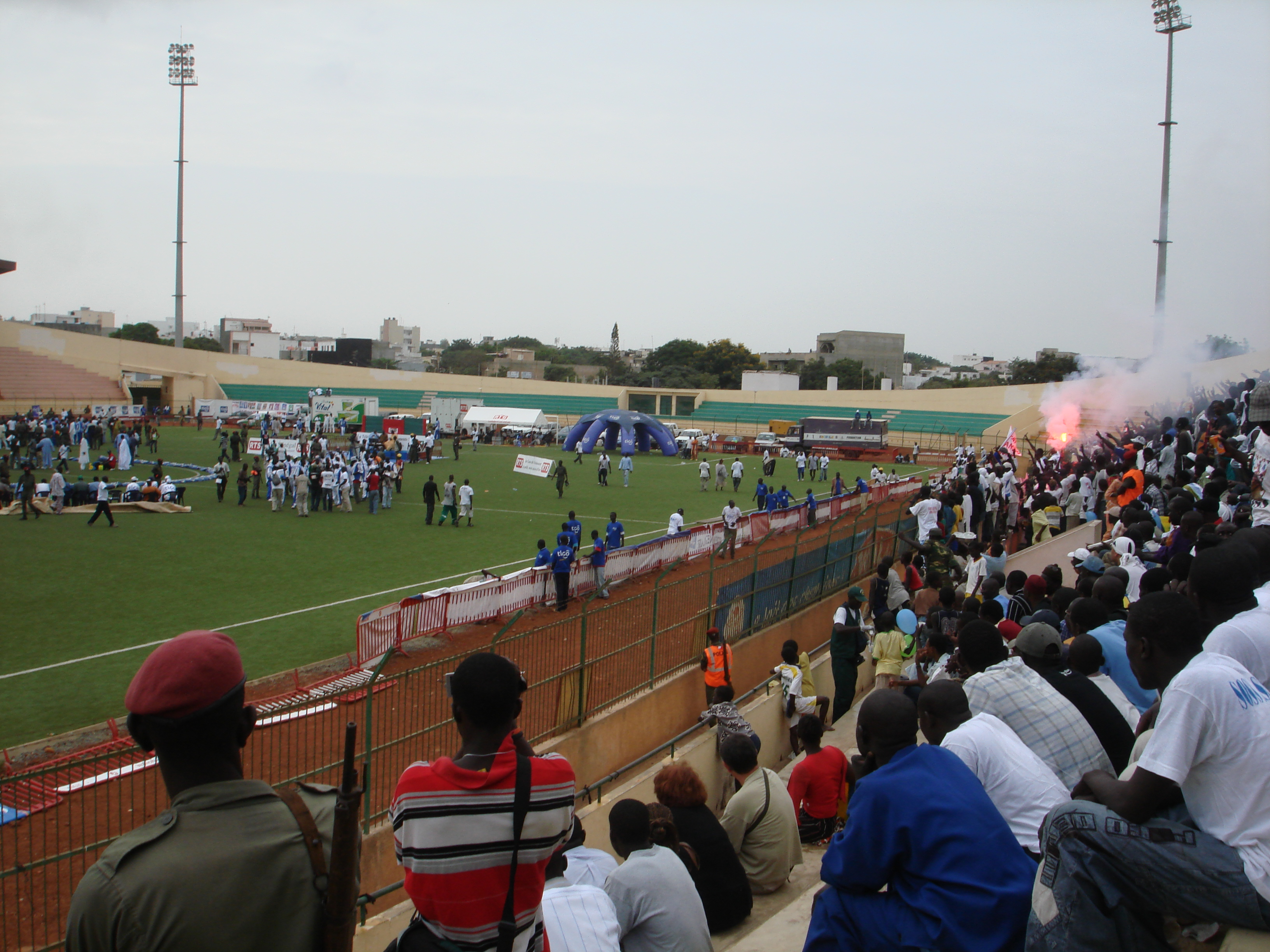
View of the stadium during a Senegalese wrestling match.

The stadium holds 30,000 people and its current surface is synthetic turf.

== Events ==
The stadium is currently used mostly for football matches and serves as a home ground of ASC Diaraf, AS Douanes, US Ouakam and ASC Xam Xam. It is also used for concerts, political gatherings, and Senegalese wrestling matches.

On February 1, 1974, The Jackson 5 performed at the stadium in their The Jackson 5 World Tour

A mass stampede occurred in July 2017 in the stadium, leaving eight dead and 60 injured.

== See also ==
- ASC Xam Xam
- Sport in Senegal
- Stade Léopold Sédar Senghor
