= ASC Xam-Xam =

Senegalese football club

- Full name: Association Sportive et Culturelle; Xam-Xam
- Founded: 2001
- Ground: Stade Demba Diop; Dakar, Senegal
- Capacity: 20,000
- League: Senegal National League 1
Home colours

ASC Xam-Xam is a Senegalese football club based in Dakar, which is a member of the Senegal National League 1 (third tier).

== History ==
In 2008 they played in the Senegal Premier League the top division in Senegalese football. Their home stadium is Stade Demba Diop.

== Current squad ==
Note: Flags indicate national team as defined under FIFA eligibility rules; some limited exceptions apply. Players may hold more than one non-FIFA nationality.

No.	Pos.	Nation	Player
—	--	SEN	Assane Sy
—	--	SEN	Mohamed Benjeloun Ndiaye
—	--	SEN	Pape Ndiaye
