= M'Bour =

Town in the Thiès Region, Senegal

M'Bour مبور
- City and commune
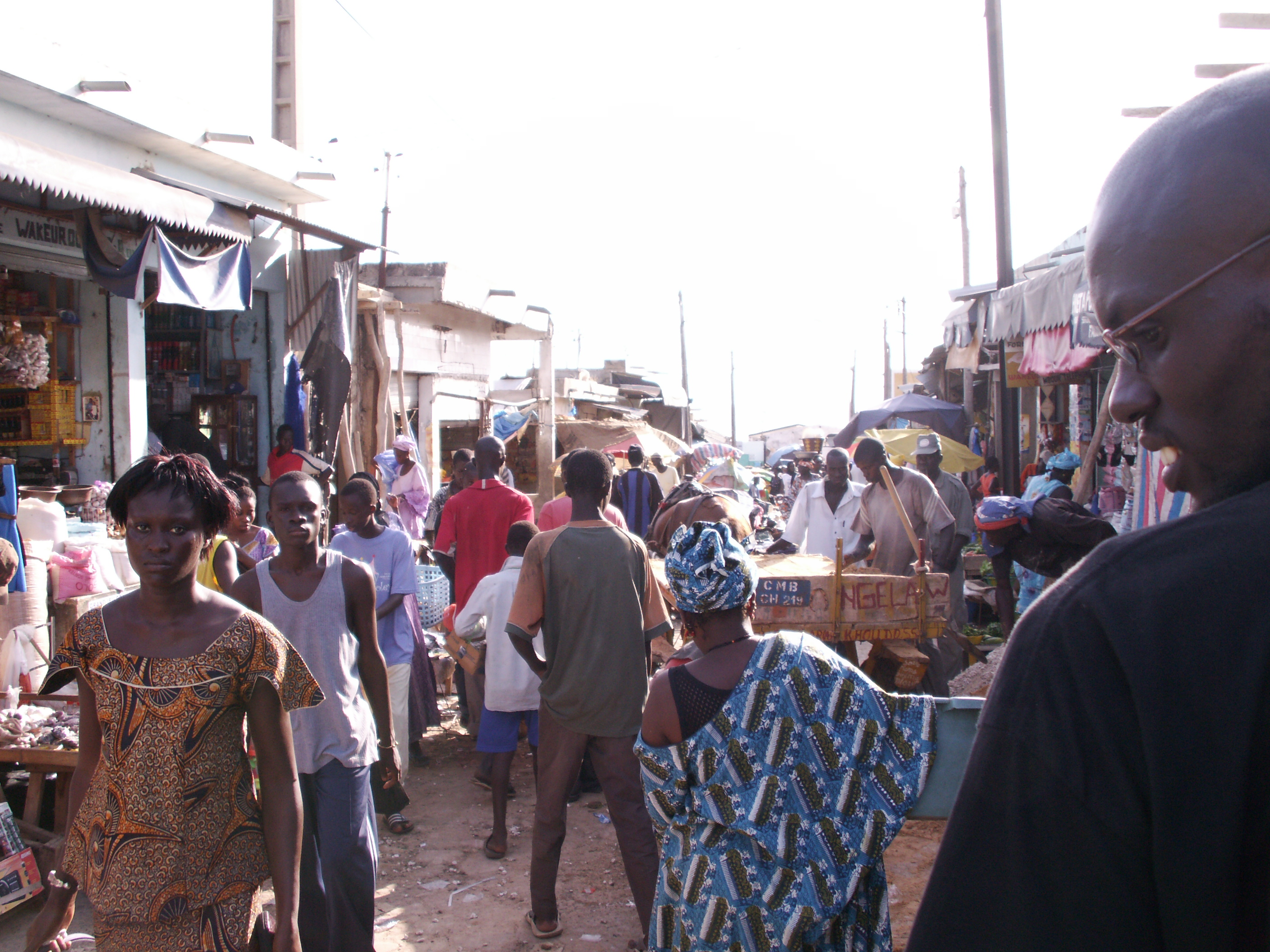

- Location within Senegal
- Coordinates: 14°25′N 16°58′W
- Country: Senegal
- Region: Thiès Region
- Department: M'Bour

Area
  - City and commune: 24.61 km^{2} (9.50 sq mi)

Population (2023 census)
  - City and commune: 284,189
  - Density: 11,550/km^{2} (29,910/sq mi)
- Time zone: UTC+0 (GMT)

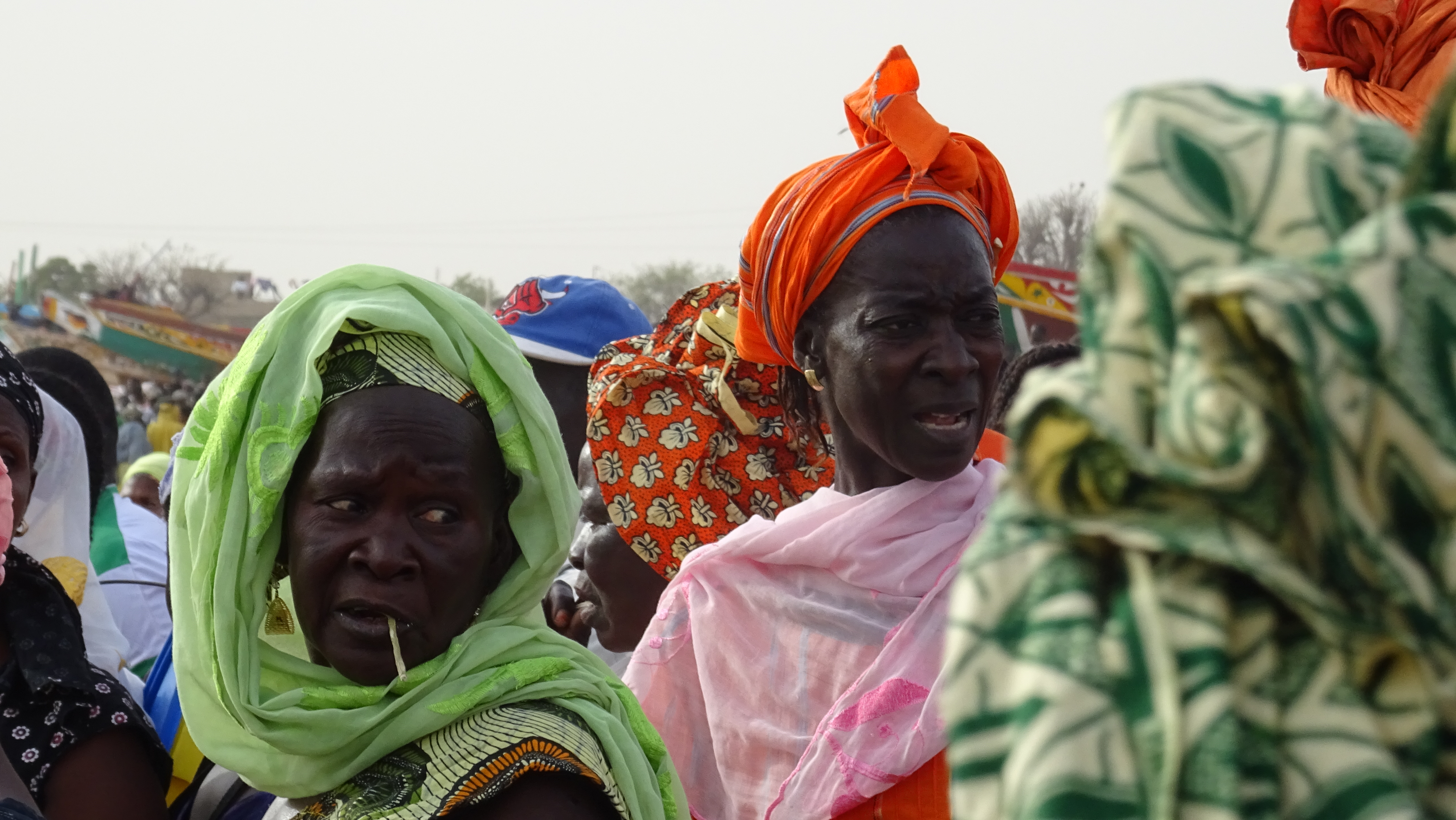
Senegalese women Mbour Beach

M'Bour or Mbour (Arabic: مبور; Wolof: Mbuur), is a city in the Thiès Region of Senegal. It lies on the Petite Côte, approximately 80 kilometres (50 mi) south of Dakar. It is home to a population of 284,189 (2023 census).

The city's major industries are tourism, fishing and peanut processing. M'Bour is a tourist destination. It is situated on the "Little Coast" and connected to Dakar via the N1 road.

It is noteworthy for the orphanage and nursery for children run by the international NGO Vivre Ensemble, and for the African Institute for Mathematical Sciences, Senegal.

140 migrants drowned on October 29, 2020 when a boat from M'Bour that was bound for the Canary Islands capsized near Saint-Louis, Senegal.

== Climate ==
M'Bour's climate is characterized by hot weather year-round. M'Bour has a hot semi-arid climate (Köppen: BSh), with a long dry season from November to May. The vast majority of precipitation falls between July and September.

Climate data for M'Bour (1991–2020)
Month	Jan	Feb	Mar	Apr	May	Jun	Jul	Aug	Sep	Oct	Nov	Dec	Year
Mean daily maximum °C (°F)	34.1 (93.4)	35.5 (95.9)	36.3 (97.3)	35.2 (95.4)	33.1 (91.6)	31.7 (89.1)	32.4 (90.3)	32.2 (90.0)	32.4 (90.3)	34.5 (94.1)	36.2 (97.2)	34.8 (94.6)	34.0 (93.2)
Mean daily minimum °C (°F)	16.6 (61.9)	17.9 (64.2)	18.5 (65.3)	19.1 (66.4)	20.2 (68.4)	23.0 (73.4)	24.3 (75.7)	24.4 (75.9)	23.9 (75.0)	23.1 (73.6)	19.7 (67.5)	17.6 (63.7)	20.7 (69.3)
Record low °C (°F)	8.5 (47.3)	10.0 (50.0)	10.5 (50.9)	12.9 (55.2)	13.7 (56.7)	16.5 (61.7)	17.2 (63.0)	18.0 (64.4)	18.5 (65.3)	13.5 (56.3)	12.0 (53.6)	9.4 (48.9)	8.5 (47.3)
Average precipitation mm (inches)	2.2 (0.09)	0.4 (0.02)	0.2 (0.01)	0.0 (0.0)	0.5 (0.02)	12.3 (0.48)	103.1 (4.06)	231.0 (9.09)	176.6 (6.95)	33.6 (1.32)	0.6 (0.02)	0.0 (0.0)	560.5 (22.07)
Average precipitation days (≥ 1.0 mm)	0.2	0.1	0.1	0.0	0.1	1.3	6.8	12.9	11.0	3.0	0.1	0.0	35.6
Source: NOAA

== Notable residents or natives ==
- Youssou Diagne (1938–2022), politician
- Viviane N'Dour (born 1973), singer
- Maurice Ndour (born 1992), basketball player for Hapoel Jerusalem of the Israeli Basketball Premier League
- Ibrahima Niane (born 1999), footballer

== Gallery ==
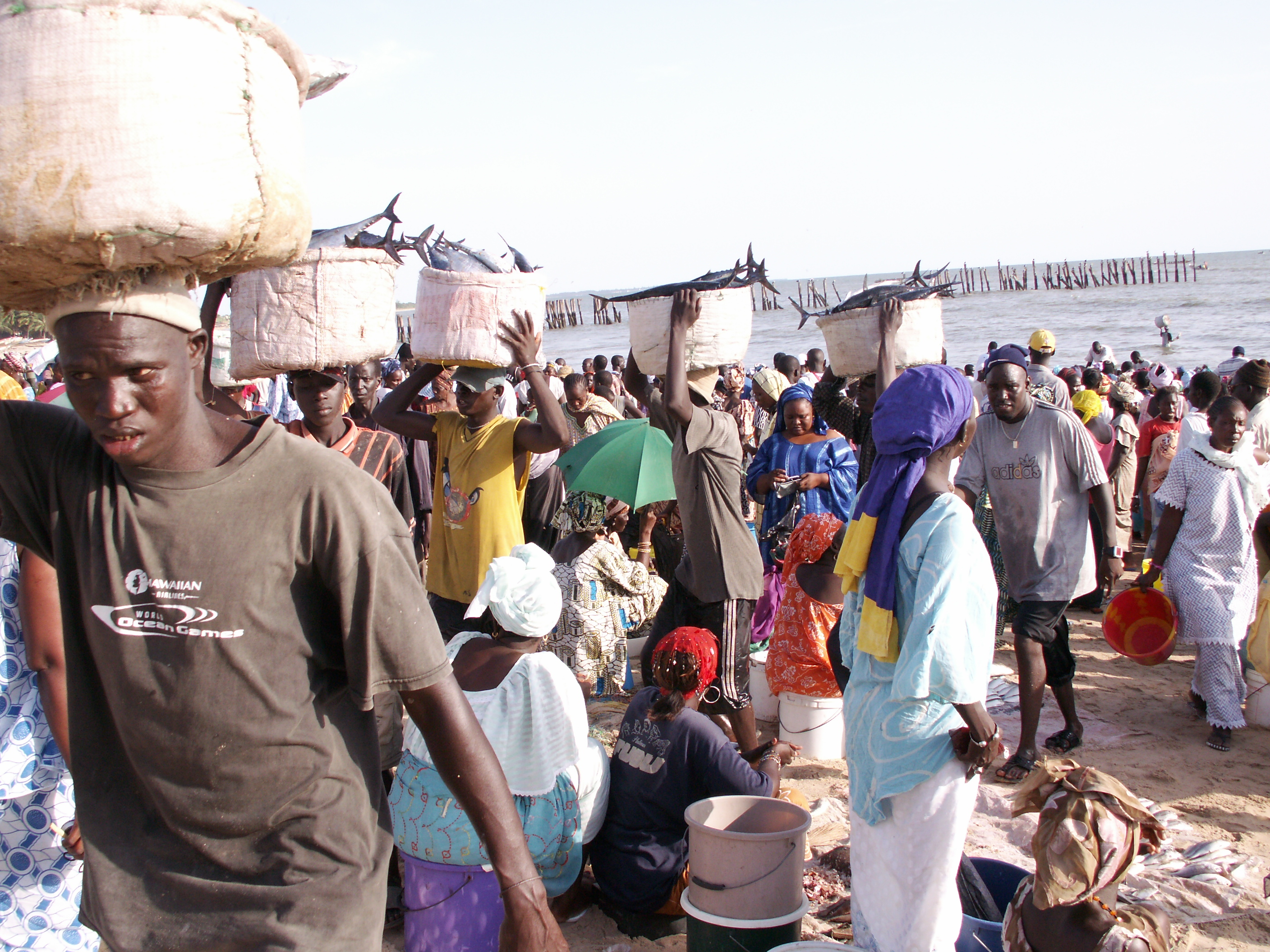
Port of M'Bour in Senegal

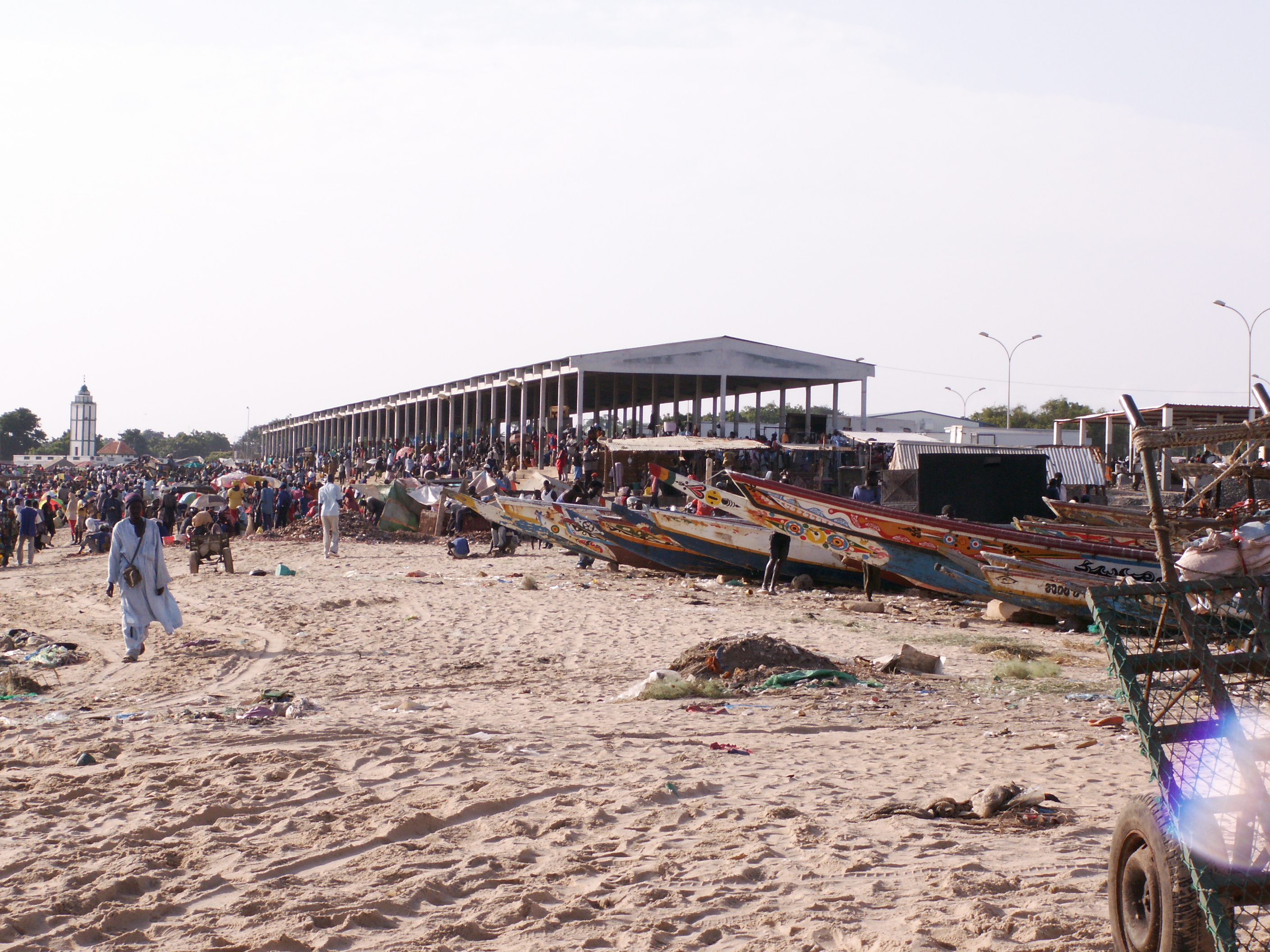
Port of M'Bour, Senegal

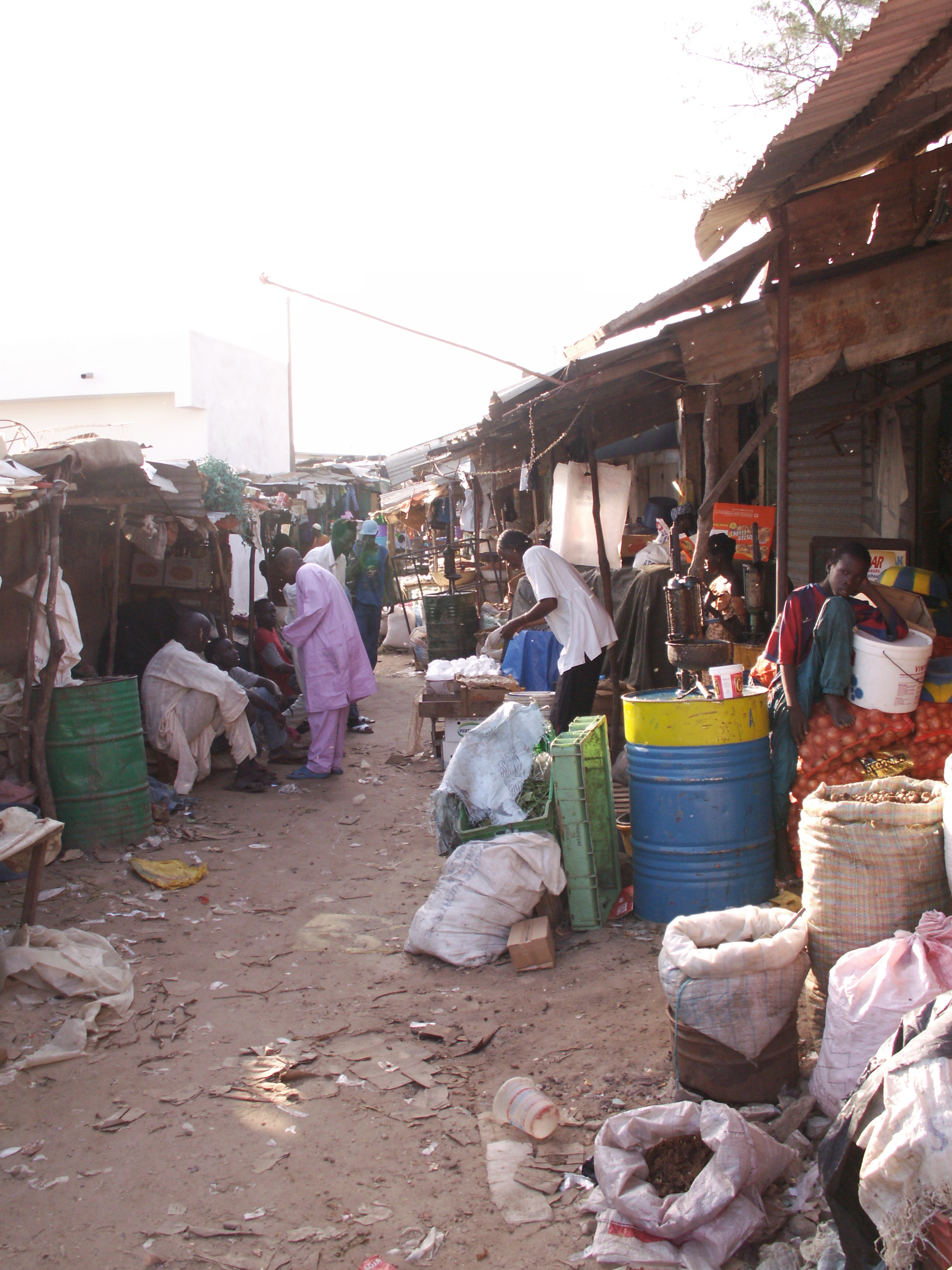
Streets near the port of M'Bour, Senegal

== See also ==
- Mbour Sign Language
