= Olympique de Ngor =

Senegalese football club

- Full name: Olympique de Ngor
- Founded: 1955
- Ground: Stade de Ngor; Ngor, Dakar, Senegal
- Capacity: 3,000
- League: Senegal Premier League
- 2015–16: 14th, Relegated
Home colours	Away colours

Olympique de Ngor is a football club from Senegal based in the neighborhood of Ngor in the northwest of Dakar. They are one of the top-flight football clubs. Stade de Ngor is their stadium used for football matches. It has a capacity of 3,000. It is the westernmost football club on the African mainland along with Almadies of Ngor, Cape Verde's Tarrafal FC de Monte Trigo (from 1956 to 2004, Sporting Clube do Porto Novo, from 2009 to 2014, Santo André were the one) is the westernmost football (soccer) club in the whole of Africa since 2014, though it is a lesser and least prominent club.

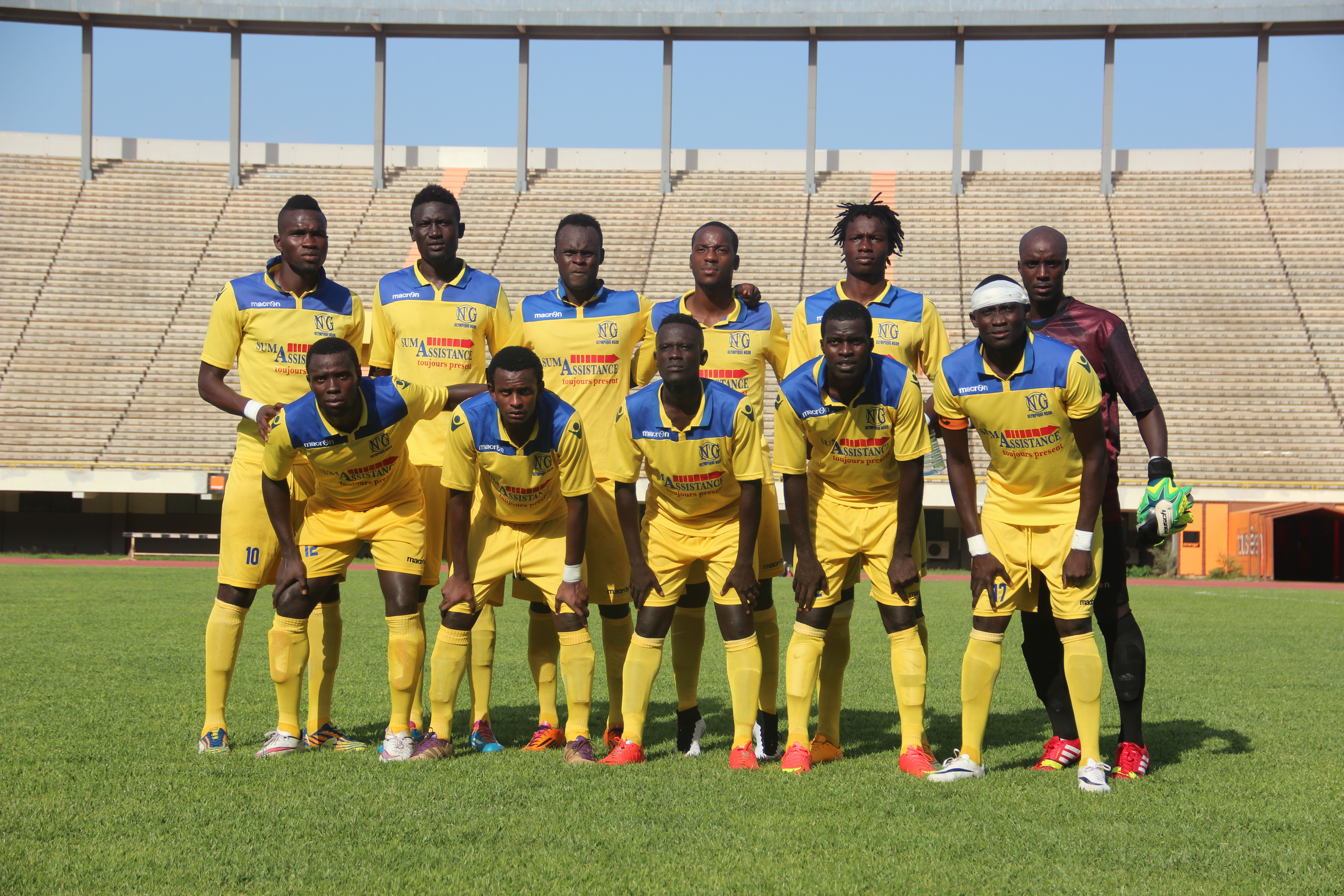
The squad of Olympique de Ngor during the 2014–15 season

== History ==
The club was founded in 1955 in Dakar in the final years of French colonial rule, later it would be based in Ngor.

Not long after independence, the club headed to the 1963 cup final and the club lost 3–2 to US Rail along with the title.

Olympique Ngor was in the top position of a group in Ligue 2 in 2012. Ngor participated again in Ligue 1 in many years in 2013 and finished second with 50 points behind Diambars, the club also scored 30 goals, tied with Dakar UC, behind ASC Linguère. A year later, they finished 10th with 32 points and scored 32 goals.

Olympique Ngor headed to the 2014 cup final, their next in 51 years, the club lost 1–2 to AS Pikine in the Senegalese Cup final. As Pikine both won the championship and the cup in 2014, Olympique de Ngor as the cup-runner up qualified both into the 2015 CAF Confederation Cup and the Assemblé Nationale Cup (now the Super Cup).

At their only appearance in the continental cup, the club had their only win in a match with Unisport de Bafang, they entered the first round as they had a total of 3-2 goals scored in its two matches. The club suffered two losses to Ghana's Hearts of Oak and was out of the competition. 6 goals Olympique de Ngor were scored at the CAF Confederation Cup.

The club was last place in the 2015-16 season with 25 points and had only 5 wins and 11 losses. The club currently plays in Ligue 2 as of the 2016–17 season.

== Achievements ==
- Coupe de l'Assemblée Nationale du Sénégal: 1
  - 2014

== League and cup history ==
=== Performance in CAF competitions ===
Olympique Ngor's results in CAF competition
Season	Competition	Qualification method	Round	Opposition	Home	Away	Aggregate
2015	CAF Confederation Cup	Senegalese Cup runner-up	Preliminary Round	(Cameroon) Unisport de Bafang	3–1	1–0	3–2
2015	CAF Confederation Cup	Senegalese Cup runner-up	First Round	(Ghana) Accra Hearts of Oak	2–3	2–1	3–5

=== National level ===
Season	Div.	Pos.	Pl.	W	D	L	GS	GA	GD	P	Cup	League Cup	AN Cup	Notes
2011–12	2	-	-	-	-	-	-	-	-	-				
2013	1	2	30	13	11	6	30	24	+6	50				
2013–14	1	10	26	8	8	10	19	32	-13	32	Finalist		Winner	
2014–15	1	12	26	6	10	10	22	27	-5	28				
2015-16	1	14	26	5	10	11	20	29	-9	25				

== Statistics ==
- Best position: 2nd (national)
- Best position at cup competitions: Finalist (national)
- Appearance at a Super Cup competition: Once, in 2014
- Appearances at the League Cup: 9
- Total goals scored at the cup competitions: 6, all in 2015
- Highest number of points in a season: 50, in 2013
- Highest number of goals scored in a season: 30, in 2013
- Highest number of goals conceded in a season: 32, in 2014
