= List of slavery-related memorials and museums =

A number of organizations, museums and monuments are intended to serve as memorials to slavery, and its millions of victims.

== Multiple countries ==
- Door of Return

== Angola ==
- National Museum of Slavery in Morro da Cruz, Luanda, Angola

== Benin ==
- Door of No Return, Ouidah

== Barbados ==
- Emancipation Statue in Haggett Hall, Barbados

== Finland ==
- Orjaleiripatsas, memorial in memory of the victims of the Slave trade during the Great Wrath.

== France ==
- Slavery museum

== Ghana ==
- Elmina Castle on the Gulf of Guinea
- Cape Coast Castle, Cape Coast

== Netherlands ==
- Kurá Hulanda Museum, in Otrobanda, Willemstad, Curaçao
- National Slavery Monument, in Amsterdam
- Tree of Life, Monument of Awareness, in Amsterdam

== Nigeria ==
- Slave History Museum in Calabar

== Portugal ==
- Mercado de Escravos, in Lagos, Faro District

== Senegal ==
- House of Slaves, on Gorée Island, 3 km off the coast of the city of Dakar, Senegal

== South Africa ==
- Slave Lodge, Cape Town
- Slave memorials in Elim, Western Cape

== Suriname ==
- Statue of Kwakoe in Paramaribo

== Qatar ==
- Bin Jelmood House of the Msheireb Museums in Doha, Qatar, charts the history of the global slave trade, particularly the Indian Ocean slave trade of the region, and the changes caused by its abolition.

== United Kingdom ==
- International Slavery Museum, at the Merseyside Maritime Museum in Liverpool
- Wilberforce House, part of the Museums Quarter of Kingston-upon-Hull
- Buxton Memorial Fountain, in London
- The Wake by Khaleb Brooks in London (planned)
- The gravestone of 'Scipio Africanus' in Bristol
- Plaques for people compensated after the abolition of slavery in Bristol

== United States ==
- Confederate Memorial in Arlington, Virginia
- Emancipation Memorial in Washington D.C.
- Emancipation Memorial in Boston, Massachusetts
- The Emancipation and Freedom Monument on Brown's Island, Richmond
- 1811 Kid Ory Historic House, LaPlace, Louisiana
- Anson Street African Burial Ground, in South Carolina
- Whitney Plantation Historic District, near Wallace, in St. John the Baptist Parish, Louisiana
- The Good Darky in n Natchitoches, Louisiana
- Elijah P. Lovejoy Monument in Alton, Illinois
- The Florida Slavery Memorial at the Florida Capitol in Tallahassee
- Harriet Tubman Memorial in Manhattan in New York City
- Harriet Tubman Memorial in the South End neighborhood of Boston, Massachusetts
- Hearth: Memorial to the Enslaved in Williamsburg, Virginia
- El Hombre Redimido in Barrio Cuarto, Ponce, Puerto Rico
- The Legacy Museum in Montgomery, Alabama
- Memorial to Enslaved Laborers in Charlottesville, Virginia
- National Memorial for Peace and Justice in Montgomery, Alabama
- Monumento a la abolición de la esclavitud at Parque de la Abolición in Barrio Cuarto in Ponce, Puerto Rico
- Mothers of Gynecology Monument in Montgomery, Alabama
- Portsmouth African Burying Ground in Portsmouth, New Hampshire
- Slavery Memorial on the campus of Brown University in Providence, Rhode Island
- Statue of Frederick Douglass in Rochester, New York
- United Nations Slavery Memorial in New York City, New York
