= African Americans in Ghana =

Demographic resident in Ghana

Total population
- 3,000 - 5,000

Regions with significant populations
- Accra

Languages
- English (American English, Ghanaian English); French; Akan; Others

Religion
- Protestantism (majority); Islam, other religions (minority)

Related ethnic groups
- Americo-Liberian, Sierra Leone Creole, African Americans, Tabom People

The history of African Americans in Ghana goes back to individuals such as American civil rights activist and writer W. E. B. Du Bois (1868–1963), who settled in Ghana in the last years of his life and is buried in the capital, Accra. Since then, other African Americans who are descended from enslaved people taken from areas within the present-day jurisdiction of Ghana and neighboring states have applied for permanent resident status in Ghana. As of 2015, the number of African American residents has been estimated at 3,000 people, a large portion of whom live in Accra.

== Ghana's independence ==
The Gold Coast was a British colony that was located on the West Coast of Africa. On 6 March 1957, the Gold Coast, renamed Ghana, became the first colony in the Sub-Saharan region of Africa to gain its independence from European colonial rule under the leadership of its first president, Kwame Nkrumah. Ghana's status as the first independent African country and Nkrumah's actions as president of Ghana were decisive factors in the migration of African Americans to the newly established nation, due to the symbol it shared with freedom, and Nkrumah as a liberator.

== African-American perspectives of Ghana ==
Ghana's independence had an important impact on African-American views of Africa. This is because, "[for] perhaps the first time, Africa surpassed America in terms of not only what it seemed to represent symbolically, but also in terms of its objective reality. As a result, black Americans looked to Ghana as that new Promised Land". As Ghana became a free nation, it carried the hopes and dreams of people who identified with the African continent.

Ghana served as a symbol of inspiration to people of African descent, that Africa was not the barbaric land that it was made out to be. It pushed Black Americans to recreate their view of post-colonial Africa and its possible futures. Ghana served as a place where Blacks could go to escape the racism that they experienced in the United States and the criticism they faced when they criticized the racist American society.

Surrounded by Africans, African Americans felt that they could be reunited with long-lost relatives in their homeland. However, some argue that these perceptions of Africa by African Americans were detrimental to African American experiences in Ghana. According to Derek Catsam, "the African American image of Africa has historically been no less warped [than the White American image] but has been characterized by romanticism, fetishism, and nostalgia. Black Americans have often perpetuated an uncomplicated view of Africa as a vestigial homeland awaiting the return of its lost souls."

While this view has tended to be more charitable toward Africa than the more generalized American view, it is not necessarily less problematic."

Ghana further allowed for hope to be brought to African Americans who chose to remain in the United States. In his sermon on the Exodus in 1957, Martin Luther King Jr. highlighted that the way to gain equality could be achieved, as the demonstration that Ghana had given them hope. They also needed to, however, persevere and not give up, even when it appeared that they had gained equality.

== 20th-century migrations ==
In the mid-1950s, there began a new era in which African Americans began to migrate to Ghana as a result of its independence. African Americans, especially civil rights activists such as W. E. B. Du Bois and Julian Bond, went to Ghana to aid the country's development and escape the racism of the United States. Some went to Ghana due to its nonalignment as a country during the Cold War.

Kwame Nkrumah constantly tried to keep Ghana independent from the influences of the West and the Soviet Union, and Black expatriates, especially radicals, saw this as an opportunity to express their views and not have to deal with the criticism they faced in America. Nkrumah, knowing that Ghana would need international connections to assist in its development and the independence of every other country on the African continent, welcomed African Americans into the country and even brought American civil rights leaders into his inner circle as advisors and political allies.

== African Americans in Ghanaian politics ==
Black American activists who went to Ghana to "[engage] with Pan-Africanist and socialist thought under the tutelage of Ghana's President Kwame Nkrumah and African diasporan political exiles" (Commander 6) typically ended up involved with Ghanaian politics, whether indirectly or actively. Some like Maya Angelou became close with Ghanaian officials and even Nkrumah himself, allowing them to express influence over political situations. They used their views to criticize and praise the Ghanaian government for its actions and influence how the officials governed Ghana. Particularly in her book All God's Children Need Travelling Shoes (1986), she makes reference to her time in Ghana being a dream, and romanticizing it, in comparison to being an African-American in the United States.

=== Ghanaian opinion of expatriates in the Government ===
As Black American expatriates began to be involved in Ghana's government, non-American members of Ghana's government began to become suspicious of Nkrumah's ideals. They criticized the high governmental positions that foreigners were given upon coming to Ghana. This suspicion caused a lot of tension between the Ghanaians in the government and the African Americans in the government. The suspicion was so great that there was an assassination attempt on Nkrumah in 1962. Tensions continued to rise, so much so that "concerns about possible CIA infiltration, a severe economic downturn, and Nkrumah's seeming support of a petty bourgeoisie led to the National Liberation Council's 1966 military coup d'etat", which not only publicly opposed Nkrumah, but also weakened the African-American expatriate community.

In the 21st century, new African-American arrivals, being richer, are pricing out the locals. A private real estate development called Sanbra City (meaning Return City) is a gated, eco-friendly community, with houses starting at $180,000 American dollars, far out of the price range of locals, causing criticism. It also means that the land for these new developments is unavailable for farmers.

== History ==
As journalist Lydia Polgreen reported in 2005 in The New York Times, the fact that Ghanaian slave exports to the Americas were so important between the 16th and 19th centuries has made Ghana currently try to attract the descendants of enslaved Africans from the Americas to return to settle there and make the country their new home – although not all are of Ghanaian descent. As reported by Valerie Papaya Mann, president of the African American Association of Ghana, thousands of African Americans now live in Ghana for at least part of the year. To encourage migration, or at least visits by African Americans, Ghana decided, in 2005, to offer them a special visa, but has not extended dual citizenship to African Americans.

Fourteen years later, African-American author Jacqueline Woodson wrote, again in The New York Times, about her first visit to Ghana, where she found "a massive marketing campaign called 'Year of Return'". Woodson said that she wanted to visit Ghana again and again, but not to live there year-round, knowing she is not African, but African-American. She also wondered if social inequalities in Ghana today reflect the same mindset that permitted blacks to sell other blacks to whites.

The Year of Return, Ghana 2019 is an initiative of the government of Ghana that is intended to encourage African diasporans to come to Africa (specifically Ghana) to settle and invest in the continent. It was formally launched by President Nana Akufo-Addo in September 2018 in Washington, D.C. as a program for Africans in the diaspora to unite with Africans. Its year, 2019, is symbolic, as it commemorates 400 years since the first enslaved Africans touched down in Jamestown, Virginia in the United States.

The biannual Pan African Historical Theatre Project now known as Panafest has welcomed African Americans and others in the African Diaspora to Ghana since 1992 and was scheduled as a part of the Year of Return events in Ghana in 2019. The festival takes place in Accra, and among other locations, Cape Coast.

== Culture ==
Organizations have been established to support Afro-American residents in Ghana, including the African-American Association of Ghana.

== Education ==
American International School of Accra and Lincoln Community School are in Accra.

== Notable people ==
- W. E. B. Du Bois (1868–1963), American civil-rights activist and co-founder of the NAACP, received Ghanaian citizenship before his death.
- Robert Lee (1920–2010), dentist and activist for historic development of former slave castles.
- Charles Odamtten Easmon (1913–1994), the first Ghanaian to qualify as a surgeon specialist, partially descended from African Americans.
- Maya Angelou (1928–2014), writer, visited and lived in Ghana, describing her experiences in her 1986 memoir All God's Children Need Traveling Shoes.
- Stevie Wonder (born 1950), musician, acquired Ghanaian citizenship in 2024 and decided to relocate there.
- IShowSpeed (born 2005), online streamer, received Ghanaian citizenship at the end of his tour in Africa.

== See also ==
- African Americans in Africa
- Back-to-Africa movement
- Diaspora tourism
- Door of Return
- Ghana-United States relations
- Ghanaian American
- Genealogy tourism (Africa)
- Return to roots
- Right of return (Ghana)
- Year of Return, Ghana 2019
