= Back-to-Africa movement =

Political movement in the United States during the 19th and 20th centuries

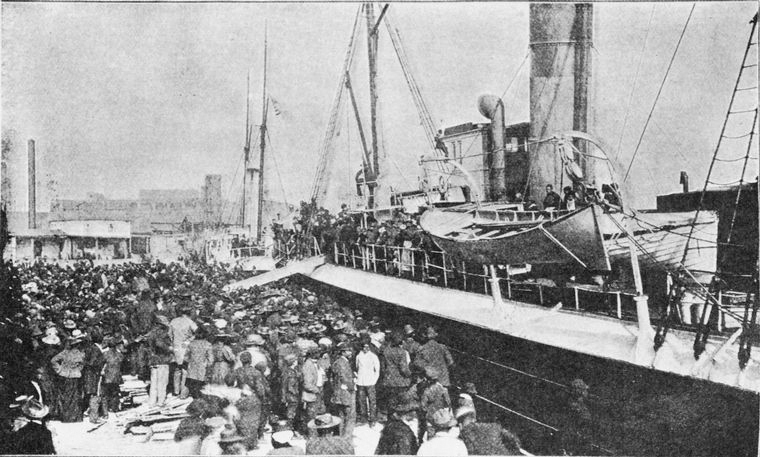
- Departure of African Americans to Liberia, 1896
- Location: Atlantic world
- Participants: Colonization societies: Sierra Leone Company; American Colonization Society
- Outcome: Creation and settlement of Sierra Leone and Liberia

The back-to-Africa movement was a political movement in the 19th and 20th centuries advocating for a return of the descendants of African American enslaved people to most regions of the African continent. The small number of formerly enslaved who settled—some under duress—initially faced brutal conditions, due to diseases to which they no longer had biological resistance. As the failure became known in the United States in the 1820s, it spawned and energized the radical abolitionist movement. In the 20th century, the Jamaican political activist and black nationalist Marcus Garvey, members of the Rastafari movement, and other African Americans supported the concept, but few actually left the United States.

In the late 18th century, thousands of Black Loyalists joined British military forces during the American Revolutionary War. In 1787, the British Crown founded a settlement in Sierra Leone in what was called the "Province of Freedom", beginning a long process of settlement of formerly enslaved African Americans in Sierra Leone. During these same years, some African Americans launched their own initiatives to return to Africa, and by 1811, Paul Cuffe, a wealthy New England African-American/Native-American shipper, had transported some members of the group known as the "Free African Society" to Liberia. During these years, some free African Americans also relocated to Haiti, where a slave revolution had effected a free black state by 1800. On 18 November 1803, Haiti became the first nation ever to successfully gain independence through a slave revolt. In the following years, Liberia was founded by free Africans from the United States. The emigration of African Americans both free and recently emancipated was funded and organized by the American Colonization Society (ACS), which hoped that slavery could be ended as an institution, without releasing millions of former slaves into American society. The mortality rate of these settlers was high. Of the 4,571 emigrants who arrived in Liberia between 1820 and 1843, only 1,819 survived.

== Background ==
White writers did not often discuss the question of where free black people of American birth should reside, as in the 18th century: "There had been few free blacks anywhere in the country." In 1776, slavery was legal everywhere in the Thirteen Colonies that became the United States through the American Revolutionary War. There was a small number of free black people. Pressures for ending slavery began small but steadily increased. Various philosophical and religious condemnations of slavery were published, especially by Quakers. Slavery became illegal in England in 1772 by court decision (see Somerset v Stewart), and in the British Empire by statute in 1833. In France, slavery was illegal at least since the 16th century. As part of the French Revolution, it was abolished in French colonies in 1794, although it was restored from 1802 to 1848. Starting in 1791, the enslaved of Saint-Domingue revolted, gaining their freedom, and establishing the free black country of Haiti. Starting with Pennsylvania and Massachusetts in 1780, slavery was gradually abolished in all the Northern states, although this did not mean that existing slaves were always freed. Vermont, which was not part of the United States at the time, abolished adult slavery in its foundational document of 1777. In the 1840 census, there were still hundreds of slaves in the North and millions more in the South. By the 1850 census, there were no slaves in the free states. In the South, sometimes influenced by appeals from preachers—abolitionism in the United States had a strong religious component—some individuals freed their slaves or left instructions in their will, to free them upon the owner's death.

The number of free black people in the new United States skyrocketed, and the question of "what to do with them" steadily grew in importance. Even when free, nowhere in the United States did they have the same rights as white people. They were not citizens, as the Dred Scott decision made clear. Usually seen as racially inferior, few whites believed them to be a desirable or even possible part of American society. They were prohibited from living in some areas and there was much completely legal discrimination. Black passengers on river boats were not allowed in the cabin but had to stay on deck, whatever the weather. In Florida, each free black man had to have a white man who could be sued for the Negro's misdeeds, if any, since black people could neither sue nor be sued. The Quaker Zephaniah Kingsley, who believed that the amalgamation of the races was desirable, was forced to leave Florida for Haiti. In the South, until it was forbidden, free black people learned to read and write, and often came into contact with the widely circulated abolitionist writings. The slave owners who controlled the Southern states saw these free black people as a threat to the stability of the economy and society, and made no secret of their desire to be rid of them.

== The emergence of the back-to-Africa movement ==
Much of the African-American population was freed people seeking opportunity. Many Southern freed blacks migrated to the industrial North to seek employment, while others moved to surrounding Southern states. No one anywhere wanted them; they were seen as perpetual foreigners who, by working for less, took jobs from citizens. Whites were not used to sharing space with blacks in a context outside of chattel slavery. Many did not believe that free blacks had a place in America.

In the North, many whites believed that blacks could not achieve equality in the United States and therefore pushed for their emigration to Africa, even though most had been born in the U.S. and had never seen Africa.

Such sentiment was not exclusive to Northerners. One proponent of the colonization movement, Solomon Parker of Hampshire County, Virginia, was quoted as having said: "I am not willing that the Man or any of my Blacks shall ever be freed to remain in the United States.... Am opposed to slavery and also opposed to freeing blacks to stay in our Country and do sincerely hope that the time is approaching when our Land shall be rid of them."

Riots swept the free states in waves, usually in urban areas where there had been recent immigration of blacks from the South. The height of these riots was in 1819, with 25 riots recorded, resulting in many injuries and fatalities, although riots continued up through the 1830s (see anti-abolitionism in the North). The back-to-Africa movement was seen as the solution to these problems by both groups, with more support from the white population than the black population. Blacks often viewed the project with skepticism, particularly among the middle class, who feared that the Colonization movement was a ploy to deport freed African Americans to restrict their efforts against slavery. Shortly after the foundation of the American Colonization Society, 3,000 free blacks gathered in a church in Philadelphia and issued forth a declaration stating that they "will never separate ourselves voluntarily from the slave population of the country." Similarly, black leaders, such as James Forten, who had previously supported the Colonization Movement, changed their minds as a result of widespread black resistance to the idea.

=== Religious motivations for colonization ===
Following the Great Awakening, in which America was swept by a wave of religious fervor, many enslaved African Americans converted to Christianity. At the same time, many religious people in America struggled to reconcile slavery with their beliefs. Quakers in particular found difficulty in continued support for the enslavement of their brothers in Christ. For example, Reverend Moses Tichnell and Reverend Samuel R. Houston freed slaves and sent them to Liberia in 1855 and 1856, respectively. These two men, believing that they were morally obligated to finance such voyages, played an important role in the colonization movement.

=== American Colonization Society ===
The American Colonization Society (ACS) was an early advocate of the idea of relocating free blacks to West Africa. Founded in 1816 by Dr. Robert Finley, it was composed of two core groups: abolitionists and slave owners. Abolitionist members believed in freeing African slaves, along with their descendants, and providing them with the opportunity to return to Africa. Slave-owning members believed free blacks endangered the system of slavery and sought to expel them from America by means of migration.

The American Colonization Society came under attack from American abolitionists, who insisted that the removal of freed slaves from the United States reinforced the institution of slavery.

Since its inception, the American Colonization Society struggled to garner support from within free black communities. During the late 1840s and early 1850s, the creation of an independent Liberian state splintered the nearly uniform voice against colonization. The Fugitive Slave Act of 1850 provided the United States government with ample power to recapture fugitive slaves. Following its passage, many black leaders promoted emigration and colonization to a nation that would provide and protect their rights.

In spite of this, several black critics were outspoken against the back-to-Africa movement and the activities of the American Colonization Society. A report from a free black political conference in New York warned: "all kinds of chicanery and stratagem will be employed to allure the people [to the colony]...the independence of its inhabitants; the enjoyment and privileges of its citizens, will be pictured forth in glowing colors, to deceive you."

According to the Encyclopedia of Georgia History and Culture, "as early as 1820, black Americans had begun to return to their ancestral homeland through the auspices of the American Colonization Society." By 1847, the American Colonization Society founded Liberia, a land to be settled by black people returning from the United States of America. Between 1822 and the American Civil War, the American Colonization Society had migrated approximately 15,000 free blacks back to Africa.

Notable members of the American Colonization Society included Thomas Buchanan, Thomas Jefferson, James Monroe, Abraham Lincoln, James Madison, Daniel Webster, John Marshall, and Francis Scott Key.

=== Other pre-Civil War attempts ===
In 1811, Paul Cuffe, "a black man who was a wealthy man of property, a petitioner for equal rights for blacks", began to explore the idea of Black people returning to their native land; convinced that "opportunities for the advancement of black people were limited in America, and he became interested in African colonization." With the help of Quakers in Philadelphia, he was able to transport 38 blacks to Freetown, Sierra Leone, in 1815.

Martin Delany, an African American, in 1854 led the National Emigration Convention in Cleveland, Ohio. He visited Liberia. He made plans, largely unrealized, to assist Blacks in relocating there.

=== Post-emancipation ===
The back-to-Africa movement eventually began to decline but would see a revival again in 1877 at the end of the Reconstruction era, as many blacks in the South faced violence from groups such as the Ku Klux Klan. Interest among the South's black population in African emigration peaked during the 1890s, a time when racism reached its peak and the greatest number of lynchings in American history took place. The continued experience of segregation, discrimination, and the belief that they would never achieve true equality attracted many blacks to a Pan-African emancipation in their motherland.

The movement declined again following many hoaxes and fraudulent activities associated with the movement. According to Crumrin, however, the most important reason for the decline in the back-to-Africa movement was that the "vast majority of those meant to colonize did not wish to leave. Most free blacks simply did not want to go 'home' to a place from which they were generations removed. America, not Africa, was their home, and they had little desire to migrate to a strange and forbidding land not their own." They often said that they were no more African than white Americans were British.

Florida Governor Napoleon Bonaparte Broward (1905–1909) called for blacks to be permanently moved to land the federal government would purchase, either foreign or domestic. After buying their respective properties, a territory would be established where blacks could not leave, and whites could not enter.

Early 20th century attempts at resettlement were made, such as those by Chief Alfred Sam between 1913 and 1915. The eventual disillusionment of those who migrated to the North and the frustrations of struggling to cope with urban life set the scene for the back-to-Africa movement of the 1920s, established by Marcus Garvey. Garvey contemporaneously served as a major inspiration for a number of 1920s activists and preachers, such as James E. Lewis, whose Los Angeles congregation helped to finance the construction of a passenger ship. Many of those who migrated to the Northern States from the South found that, although they were financially better off, they remained at the bottom both economically and socially. Garvey supported a proposal by Torrey George McCallum that passed the Mississippi State Senate in 1922, though it was widely rejected and ridiculed by the Black press.

The movement picked up steam once again in the decade or so preceding the Second World War. Activists in the Peace Movement of Ethiopia organisation were committed to black emigration to West Africa in order to escape from the torrid social conditions which they were experiencing in the United States due to the Depression. They harboured an almost utopian vision of Liberia, created from a simultaneous vision of Pan-Africanism and a belief that the Americanisation they would provide would heal Liberia's social and economic troubles. This reflects the imperialist assumption of the PME and other back-to-Africa proponents that African-Americans had the right to return to and determine Africa's future. Others were unaware or ignored that Liberia had been crippled by the Depression and instead viewed it as prosperous. Mittie Maude Lena Gordon, the founder of the PME, was essential to this campaign as she acquired the support of Earnest Sevier Cox, a white nationalist from Richmond, Virginia. She convinced him to support their cause by using her gender in order to appear submissive and thus appeal to Cox's masculinity, as well as by playing on their mutual goal of racial separatism. Cox provided influential connections that the movement had previously lacked, and he gave the issue of black emigration political exposure when he managed to convince members of the Virginia General Assembly to recommend that the US Congress provide financial aid for this in 1936. Despite Cox's racial beliefs, the PME retained support amongst black communities because Gordon described him as a necessary, Moses-like figure.

His support soon began to diminish, so Gordon looked elsewhere, once again finding an unlikely ally on the opposite side of the moral compass in Senator Theodore G. Bilbo. An ardent white nationalist, Bilbo had been campaigning for racial separatism within the government for a while. He proposed an amendment to the House Joint Resolution 679—a work relief bill—in 1938, that would have "repatriated" African American volunteers to Liberia, providing them with financial assistance. This amendment was endorsed by Marcus Garvey and the Universal Negro Improvement Association at the Eight International UNIA convention. This amendment provided the precedent for the movement to progress; Bilbo had the political capital which he needed in order to get the issue of black repatriation into wide-scale political debate. This issue continued to exist, and in early 1939, Bilbo began to draft what came to be known as the Greater Liberia Bill. The bill suggested that the United States should purchase 400,000 square miles of African land from England and France, it should credit them as war debts, and it should provide financial assistance to black Americans in order to encourage them to relocate to Africa. It is unclear who, if anyone, the PME sent to Liberia in order to facilitate the emigration which this bill would have encouraged.

Outside the black nationalist movement, the bill did not garner much support, with leading civil rights groups such as the NAACP refusing to endorse it and the national press lambasting it. Other African Americans did not support emigration to Liberia due to charges of slavery and political corruption, which were filed against its government by the League of Nations. Additionally, the bill received very little support from the Senate; thus, black repatriation lost much of its traction. US participation in the Second World War led to a decline in public racism, which made any passing of the bill unlikely after that.

The back-to-Africa movement returned to national prominence in the 1960s, due to the racial unrest during the Civil Rights Movement. George Lincoln Rockwell, a white nationalist and the founder of the American Nazi Party, supported the resettlement of all African Americans in a new African state to be funded by the U.S. government.

Because they shared his racial separatist views, Rockwell forged some ties with leaders of the black nationalist movement, such as Nation of Islam leader Elijah Muhammad and Malcolm X — the latter of whom changed his views and opposed the N.O.I's black separatism. The National Post writes that "The American Nazi Party espoused a similar segregation dream as the Nation of Islam — even if the details differed. The American Nazis planned to offer a one-way ticket to Africa for every black person in the United States in order to form a new country. Those who chose to remain would be rounded up and placed into reservations." The Nation of Islam, holding that all white people were inherently evil, were inclined to trust Rockwell, as they viewed him as "honest" for being open in his espousal of hatred for Black people.

In January 1962, Rockwell wrote to his followers that Elijah Muhammad "knows that [race] mixing is a Jewish fraud and leads only to aggravation of the problems that it is supposed to solve...I have talked to the Muslim leaders and am certain that a workable plan for separation of the races could be effected to the satisfaction of all concerned." Of the N.O.I., Rockwell said, 'I am fully in concert with their program, and I have the highest respect for Elijah Muhammad,' and donated $20 (~$204.00 in 2023) to the Nation of Islam at their 'Freedom Rally' event on June 25, 1961, at Uline Arena in Washington, where he and 10–20 of his "stormtroopers" attended a speech given by Malcolm X. Rockwell was also guest speaker at a N.O.I event in the International Amphitheater in Chicago hosted by Elijah Mohammed and Malcolm X on February 25, 1962.

Malcolm X renounced his black separatist views after his pilgrimage to Mecca in 1964.

== Repatriation to Africa ==
Ex-slave repatriation or the emigration of African-American, Afro-Caribbean, and Black British former slaves to Africa occurred mainly during the late 18th century to mid-19th century. In the cases of Sierra Leone and Liberia, both were established by former slaves who were repatriated to Africa within a 28-year period.

=== Sierra Leone ===
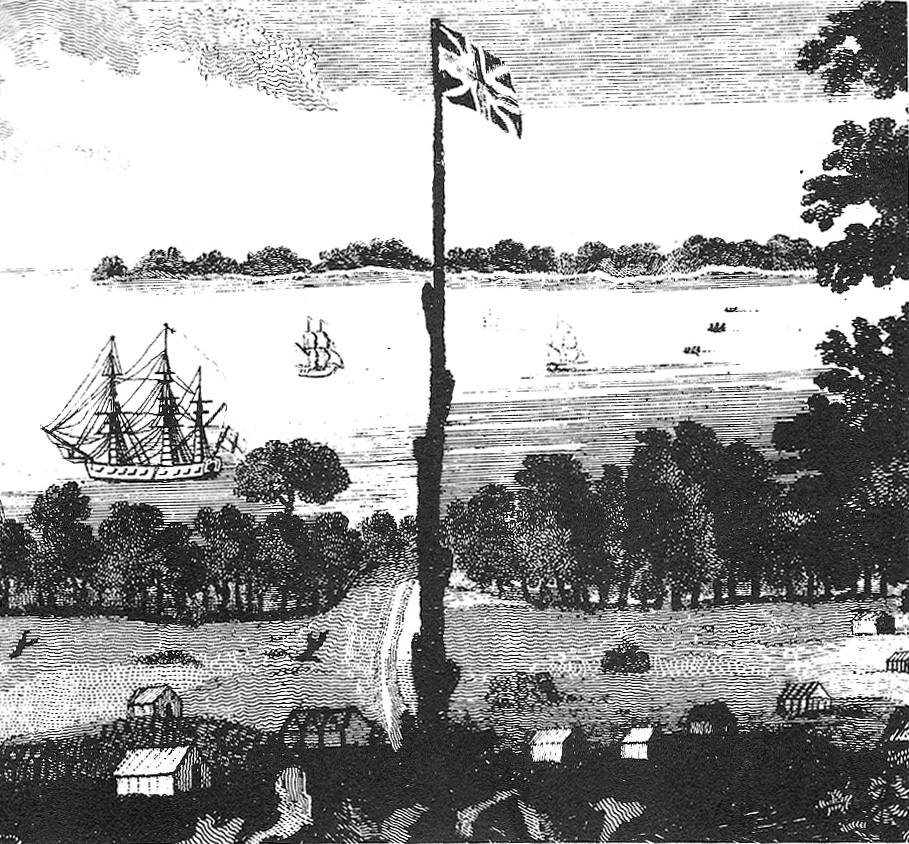
The Province of Freedom from Voyages to the River Sierra Leone by John Matthews, 1788

Many freed slaves were discontent with where they were resettled in Canada after the Revolutionary War and were eager to return to their homeland. Beginning in 1787, the British government first attempted to settle people in Sierra Leone. About 300 Black Britons, known as the Black Poor of London, were settled on the Sierra Leonean peninsula in West Africa. Within two years, most members of the settlement would die from disease or conflict with the local Temne people. In 1792, a second attempt at settlement was made when 1,100 freed slaves established Freetown with support from British abolitionist Thomas Clarkson. Their numbers were further bolstered when more than 500 Jamaican Maroons were transported first to Nova Scotia, and then to Sierra Leone in 1800.

In 1815, Paul Cuffe brought the first group of thirty-eight emigrant freed slaves from the United States to Sierra Leone. In 1820, minister Daniel Coker led a group of ninety free blacks in hopes of founding a new colony in Sierra Leone. He intended to proselytize Christianity among the Africans. Leaving New York on the ship Elizabeth, his voyage ended on an island off the coast of Sierra Leone. Arriving just before the rains of spring, the group of immigrants was soon stricken with fever. The survivors ultimately fled to Freetown, and the settlement disintegrated.

The repatriation of slaves to Africa from the United Kingdom and its dependencies was initiated by the Committee for the Relief of the Black Poor. This organization was later succeeded by the Sierra Leone Company. In time, African American Black Loyalists and West Indians would immigrate to the colony of Freetown, Sierra Leone, in smaller numbers in efforts led by black merchants or beneficiaries such as Paul Cuffe.

The Sierra Leone Creole people are descendants of the Black Poor, freed African-American, Jamaican Maroon and Liberated African slaves who settled in the Western Area of Sierra Leone between 1787 and about 1885. The colony was established by the British, supported by abolitionists, under the Sierra Leone Company as a place for freedmen. The settlers called their new settlement Freetown.

=== Liberia ===
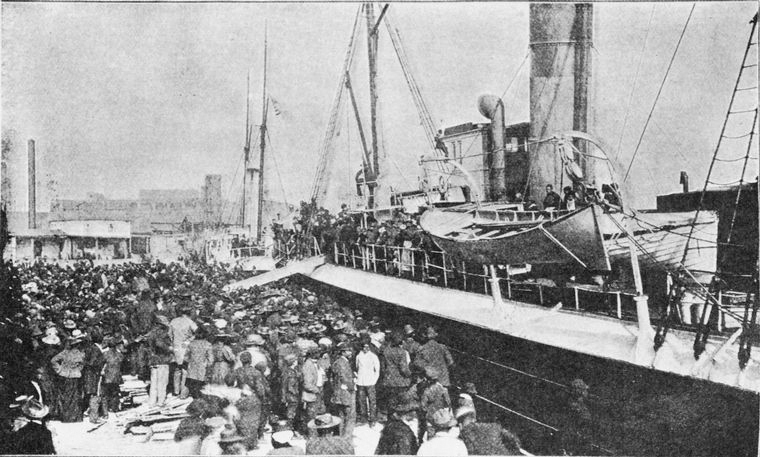
African Americans depart for Liberia, 1896

The history of Liberia (after European arrival) is, with Sierra Leone, unique in Africa; starting neither as a native state, nor as a European colony. With the departure of the first ship to Africa in 1820, the American Colonization Society established settlements for free American blacks on the coast of West Africa. The first American ships were uncertain of where they were heading. Their plan was to follow the British's paths, or simply take a chance on where they would land. At first, they followed the previous routes of the British and reached the coast of Sierra Leone. After leaving Sierra Leone, the Americans slowly reached a more southern part of the African coastline.

The Americans eventually found a suitable spot to establish their colonies, arriving at what the British had named the Pepper Coast. (The name of this region referred to the type of ginger spice used for medicine flavoring, Grains of paradise.) Along the Pepper Coast, local African groups were variably forced or convinced to give the Americans tracts of land; most probably assumed they were providing short-term land leases based on ancestral patterns of landlord-stranger relationships. Over the course of twenty years, a series of fragmented settlements sprang across Liberia's coast, which had been inhabited by indigenous people since at least the 16th century. Along with the difficulty of gaining enough land, life proved hard for these early settlers. Disease was widespread, along with the lack of food. Almost 50% of the new settlers died in the first twenty years after their arrival in Liberia.

Liberia declared independence on July 26, 1847. With an elected black government and the offer of free land to African-American settlers, Liberia became the most common destination of emigrating African Americans during the 19th century. Newly arriving African Americans to Liberia experienced many challenges, including broken family ties, very high mortality rates from disease, and a difficult adjustment period. A group of 43 African Americans from Christiansburg, Virginia, left for Liberia in 1830, but suffered high mortality. "Eighty percent of the emigrants were dead within ten years of landing there, most of them victims of malaria; another ten percent quit the colony, with the majority fleeing to Sierra Leone." Many African Americans who survived this period of adjustment in Liberia became fond of the country.

Black interest in Liberian emigration emerged when the Civil War promised the end of slavery and meaningful change to the status of Black Americans. Some 7,000 enslaved people were freed by their masters, so at that point, those free African Americans left the U.S. to escape racism and have more opportunities (mainly because they had lost all hope of achievement). In the 1830s, the movement became increasingly dominated by Southern slave owners, who did not want free blacks and saw sending them to Liberia as a solution. Slaves freed from slave ships were sent there instead of their countries of origin. The emigration of free blacks to Liberia particularly increased after Nat Turner's Rebellion of 1831. Middle-class blacks were more resolved to live as black Americans; many rural poor folks gave up on the United States and looked to Liberia to construct a better life. Liberia promised freedom and equality; it also represented a chance for a better life for the South's black farmers. The Liberian government offered 25 acres of free land for each immigrant family, and 10 acres for a single adult who came to the Black republic. In the early 19th century, Liberia evoked mixed images in the minds of black Americans. They viewed Liberia as a destination for black families who left the United States in search of a better way of life, returning to their ancestral homeland of Africa.

As noted by researcher Washington Hyde, "Black Americans—who in the time of slavery lost their original languages and much of their original culture, gained a distinctly American, English-speaking Christian identity, and had no clear idea of precisely where in the wide continent of Africa their ancestors had come from—were perceived by the natives of Liberia as foreign settlers. Having an African ancestry and a black skin color were definitely not enough. Indeed, their settlement in Liberia had much in common with the contemporary white settlement of the American Frontier and these settlers' struggle with Native American tribes.... The Liberian experience can also be considered as anticipating that of Zionism and Israel—with Jews similarly seeking redemption through a return to an ancestral land and similarly being regarded as foreign interlopers by the local Arab tribes. It would take Americo-Liberians a century and more to become truly accepted as one of Liberia's ethnic groups.... All of which certainly contributed to most Black Americans rejecting the Back-to-Africa option and opting instead for seeking equal rights in America."

== Notable emigrants from the United States to Africa ==
- Joseph Jenkins Roberts (1809–1876), first President and founding father of Liberia
- Thomas Peters (1738–1792), African-American Black Loyalist leader and founder of Freetown, Sierra Leone (departed after settling in Halifax, Nova Scotia)
- William Coleman (1842–1908), President of Liberia
- Stephen Allen Benson (1816–1865), President of Liberia
- David George (1740/42–1810), African-American Baptist preacher in Sierra Leone
- Boston King (1760–1802), African-American Methodist missionary in Sierra Leone
- Henry Washington (or Harry Washington), African-born slave to first U.S. President George Washington who emigrated to Sierra Leone
- Daniel Coker (1780–1846), African-American missionary to Sierra Leone
- Edward Jones (1807–1865), African-American missionary to Sierra Leone
- Edward J. Roye (1815–1872), President of Liberia, and first president from the True Whig Party
- John Russwurm (1799–1851), founder of Freedom's Journal, the first black newspaper in the United States, who emigrated to Liberia
- Abraham Hazeley (1784–1847), founder of what was to become one of the most prominent Creole families in Freetown, Sierra Leone.
- Cato Perkins (died 1805), missionary who migrated to Freetown, where he led a strike of carpenters against the Sierra Leone Company
- Mary Perth (1740–1813), prominent African-American colonist and businesswoman in Freetown, Sierra Leone
- Easmon medical dynasty, medical and business family in Sierra Leone
- Elizabeth Renner (died 1826), emigrated to Sierra Leone and became the first female teacher and principal of a girls' school in the missionary in Africa

== See also ==
- African-American diaspora
- African Americans in Africa
- African Americans in the Revolutionary War
- Nova Scotian Settlers
- Atlantic Creole
- American Colonization Society
- Linconia
- Remigration
- African Americans in Ghana
- Afro-American settlement in Africa
- Diaspora tourism
- Door of Return
- Genealogy tourism (Africa)
- Haigui
- Return to roots
- Repatriation of Zainichi Koreans
- Linconia
- Right of return (Ghana)
- Turner Chapel, a Canadian church which is named after Bishop Turner
- Scipio Vaughan
- Year of Return, Ghana 2019
- Zionism
- Proposals for a Jewish state
- Blaxit

== General bibliography ==
- Barnes, Kenneth C. Journey of Hope: The Back-to-Africa Movement in Arkansas in the Late 1800s. Chapel Hill: University of North Carolina Press, 2004.
- Brooks, George. Landlords and Strangers: Ecology, Society, And Trade In Western Africa, 1000-1630. Routledge, 1993.
- Campbell, James. Middle Passage: African American Journeys to Africa, 1787–2005. New York: Penguin Press, 2006.
- Clegg, Claude A. III. The Price of Liberty: African Americans and the Making of Liberia. Chapel Hill: University of North Carolina Press, 2004.
- Jenkins, David (1975). Black Zion: The Return of Afro-Americans and West Indians to Africa. Wildwood House. ISBN 978-0-7045-0116-4.
- Malcolm X; Haley, Alex (1992) [1965]. The Autobiography of Malcolm X. New York: One World. ISBN 978-0-345-37671-8.
- Page, Sebastian N. Black Resettlement and the American Civil War. New York: Cambridge University Press, 2021.
- Weisbord, Robert G. Ebony Kinship: Africa, Africans, and the Afro-American. Westport, Conn.: Greenwood Press, 1973.
