= Detty December =

Detty December may refer to:

- Detty December (Ghana), a cultural and festive phenomenon that gained prominence alongside the "Year of Return” initiative launched by the government of Ghana in 2019
- Detty December (Nigeria), the festive period at the end of the year in Nigeria
