= Door of No Return =

Door of No Return may refer to:

- Door of No Return, Gorée at the House of Slaves in Senegal
- Door of No Return, Ouidah in Benin
- Door of Return in Ghana, formerly also called Door of No Return
