= Lincoln Community School =

Coordinates: 5.609766°N 0.214223°W

Lincoln Community School - Accra, Ghana
- Accra; Ghana

Information
- Type: Private, not for profit, college preparatory, co-educational, International
- Established: 1968; 58 years ago
- Head of school: Lesley Tait
- Grades: Pre-Kindergarten – Grade 12
- Enrollment: 562
- Colours: Blue and Yellow
- Website: Lincoln Community School

Lincoln Community School (LCS) is a private school in Accra, Ghana, West Africa. It is a non-profit, college-preparatory, international school. There is an expatriate population associated with the various embassies, Foreign Service agencies, NGO's, United Nations organisations, and international businesses. Lincoln Community School is an International Baccalaureate World School offering the Primary Years, Middle Years, and Diploma Programs. The school has a large number of students whose parents are Ghanaian nationals. 25% of the students are Americans, 8% are Ghanaians, and 67% are from other countries. English is the language of instruction. Classes are offered from Pre-school through to grade 12. The school year is divided into 2 semesters (August–December & January–June) and additionally into quarterly assessment periods. It was established in 1968.

== Accreditations ==
Lincoln Community School is authorised by the International Baccalaureate (IB) It is accredited by the Middle States Association of Colleges and Schools (MSA), The Council of International Schools (CIS) and is a member of The Association of International Schools in Africa (AISA).

== Facilities ==
The school has 78 classrooms including art rooms, science labs, technology labs, a ultramodern elementary building, music rooms, a visual and performing arts center, junior and senior school libraries, an early childhood center, and office space for guidance and administration. Sports facilities include a multipurpose hall, playground, a multipurpose court,1 field and a semi olympic-size swimming pool, a gymnasium, a stage, and dressing room facilities. Playground space includes 2 playing fields with recreational apparatus and a playground with a multipurpose court. There are two libraries (HUBs), one for the Elementary School, and one for secondary school.

== Enrollment ==
For 2022-2023, the student population was 629 students from 60 countries.

== Faculty ==
In 2011, there were 68 faculty members, including 26 U.S. citizens, 19 host-country nationals, 18 third-country nationals, and 5 U.K. citizens. There were also 25 teaching assistants.

== Organization ==
The School is governed by a 9-member Board of Directors. Members of the LCS Parent Association elect 6 directors for a two-year term and three directors are appointed by the U.S. Ambassador.

== See also ==
- African-Americans in Ghana
