= Forbidden Door (disambiguation) =

Forbidden Door is a professional wrestling event.

Forbidden Door or The Forbidden Door may also refer to:

- Forbidden Door (2022)
- Forbidden Door (2023)
- Forbidden Door (2024)
- Forbidden Door (2025)
- The Forbidden Door (film), 2009 Indonesian film
- The Forbidden Door, professional wrestling term referring to a working agreement between promotions

== See also ==
- Door of No Return (disambiguation)
