= African Americans in Africa =

Regions with significant populations
- Liberia: 150,000 (descendants)
- Sierra Leone: 100,000 (descendants)
- Ghana: 9,000
- South Africa: 150,000
- Ethiopia: 600–800

The history of African-American settlement in Africa extends to the beginnings of ex-slave repatriation to Africa from European colonies in the Americas.

== History ==
=== Ex-enslaved ===
The immigration of African Americans, West Indians, and Black Britons to Africa occurred mainly during the late 18th century to mid-19th century. In the cases of Liberia and Sierra Leone both were established by freed enslaved people who were repatriated to Africa within a 28-year period.

However, other ex-enslaved people were repatriated from other European territories and colonies. The Tabom people are descendants of Afro-Brazilian ex-slaves who were either voluntarily or forcefully deported by the Portuguese to Africa (some of them being deported following the Bahia Malê Revolt in 1835); they constitute a minority ethnic group on the coastal regions of modern-day Ghana and Togo.

=== Back-to-Africa movement ===
Following the abolition of slavery in the United States and elsewhere in the Americas, numerous movements for African-American settlement in Africa sprang up and fluctuated in popularity, many of them involving the colonies – Maryland in Africa, Kentucky in Africa, Mississippi in Africa, and others – that would combine to create Liberia. African-American abolitionist and Army officer Martin Delany supported a project for African-American immigration to Liberia later in his lifetime. However, it declined by the end of the 19th century following a string of hoaxes and fraudulent activities associated with the movement.

Beginning in 1787, the British government made its first attempt to settle people in Sierra Leone. About 300 Black Britons, known as the Black Poor of London, were settled on the Sierra Leonean peninsula in West Africa. Within two years, most members of the settlement would die from disease or conflict with the local Temne people. In 1792, a second attempt at settlement was made when 1,100 freed slaves established Freetown with support from British abolitionist Thomas Clarkson. Their numbers were further bolstered when over 500 Jamaican Maroons were transported first to Nova Scotia, and then to Sierra Leone in 1800. The descendants of freedmen are the Sierra Leone Creole people.

The Back-to-Africa movement achieved popularity again with Jamaican activist Marcus Garvey and his Universal Negro Improvement Association and African Communities League, who advocated racial pride amongst African-Americans in the United States and pressed for repatriation of slave descendants to Liberia and Sierra Leone. The movement fell apart by the end of the 1920s, but influenced both the Nation of Islam and the Rastafari movement; the latter, a Jamaican that saw Haile Selassie I, the emperor of Ethiopia, as a reincarnation of Jesus and Garvey as a patron saint, managed to secure a settlement in Shashamane, which exists to this day and constitutes over 200 individuals out of an urban population of around 95,000.

== People ==
=== Ghana ===
Another African-American settlement is concentrated in Accra, Ghana, which has nearly 10,000 African-American residents, primarily originating from the United States and Jamaica, who reside in the country on work permits, with a few on permanent resident status. Accra has long attracted African-American tourists since the country became the first African country to gain independence from the United Kingdom in 1957 (W. E. B. DuBois settled in Ghana in his last years and is buried in Accra), and the government has made controversial overtures to gain more African-American residents and tourists, including enacting a right of abode law in 2001. Organizations have been established to support African-American residents in Ghana, including the African-American Association of Ghana.

As of 2019, 4,000 Jamaicans were living in Ghana, along with an estimated 5,000 African-Americans who have moved to the country in recent decades.

=== Liberia ===
Americo-Liberian people, are a Liberian ethnic group of African American, Afro-Caribbean, and Liberated African descent. A similar ethnic group to the Americo-Liberians is the Sierra Leone Creole people, who share similar ancestry and related culture. Americo-Liberians trace their ancestry to free-born and formerly enslaved African Americans who emigrated in the 19th century to become the founders of the state of Liberia. They identified themselves as Americo-Liberians.

=== Sierra Leone ===
Some African Americans, following resettlement in Canada, also participated as founding settlers in Sierra Leone and other recaptive repatriates settled in present-day Côte d'Ivoire. Their descendants are the Sierra Leone Creole people.

== See also ==
- Back-to-Africa movement
- Diaspora tourism
- Door of Return
- Genealogy tourism (Africa)
- Return to roots
- Right of return (Ghana)
- Year of Return, Ghana 2019
- Blaxit
