= House of Slaves =

Museum and memorial to enslaved people in Dakar, Senegal

The House of Slaves
- Maison des Esclaves
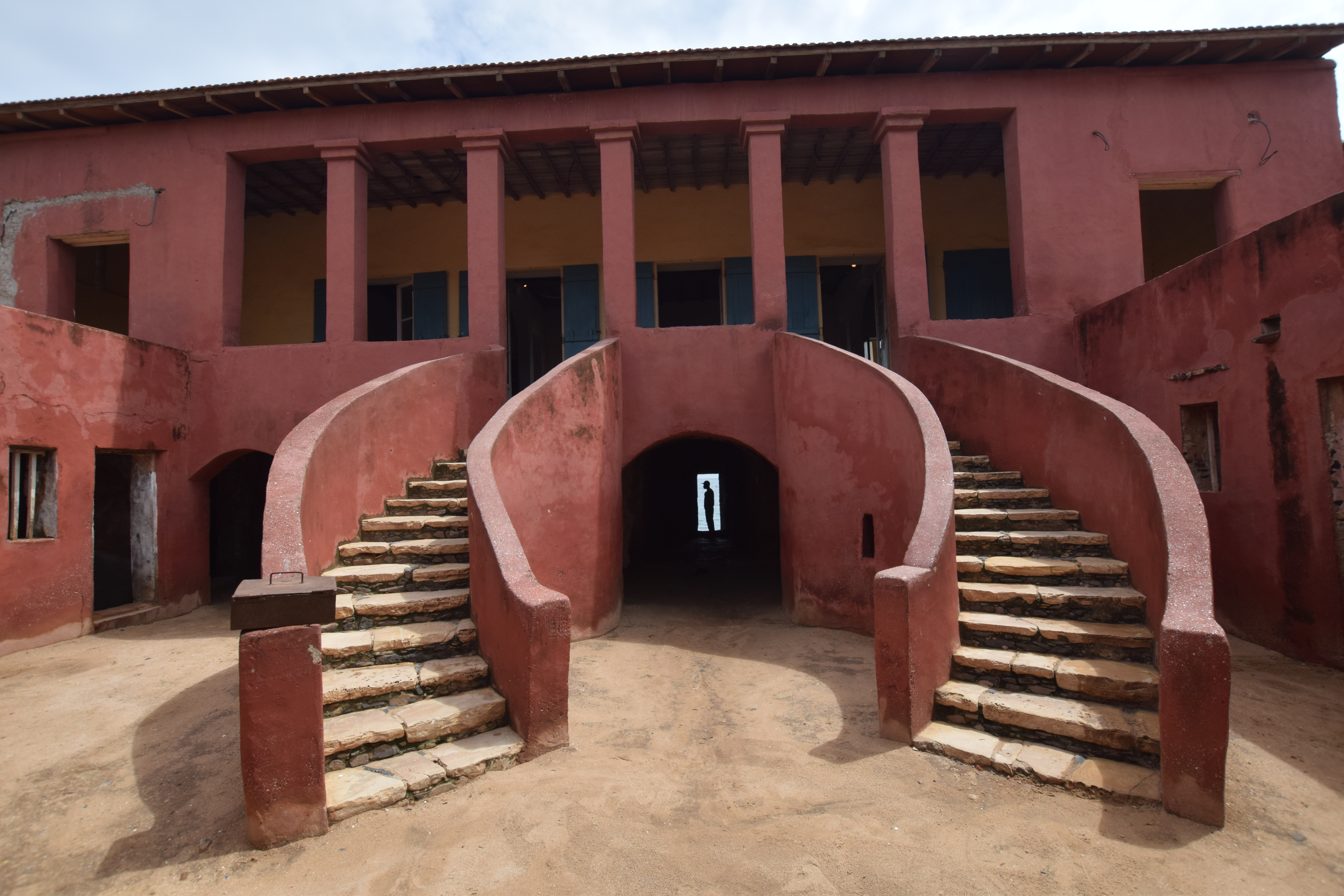
- The House of Slaves, with the Door of No Return at the end of the corridor below, out of which slaves were loaded onto ships bound for the Americas.
- Established: 1962
- Location: Gorée, Senegal
- Coordinates: 14°40′04″N 17°23′50″W

The House of Slaves (Maison des Esclaves) and its Door of No Return is a museum and memorial to the victims of the Atlantic slave trade on Gorée Island, 3 km off the coast of the city of Dakar, Senegal. Its museum, which opened in 1962 and was curated by Boubacar Joseph Ndiaye until his death in 2009, is said to memorialise the final exit point of the slaves from Africa. While historians differ on how many African slaves were actually held in this building, as well as the relative importance of Gorée Island as a point on the Atlantic slave trade, visitors from Africa, Europe, and the Americas continue to make it an important place to remember the human toll of African slavery.

== Historical use ==
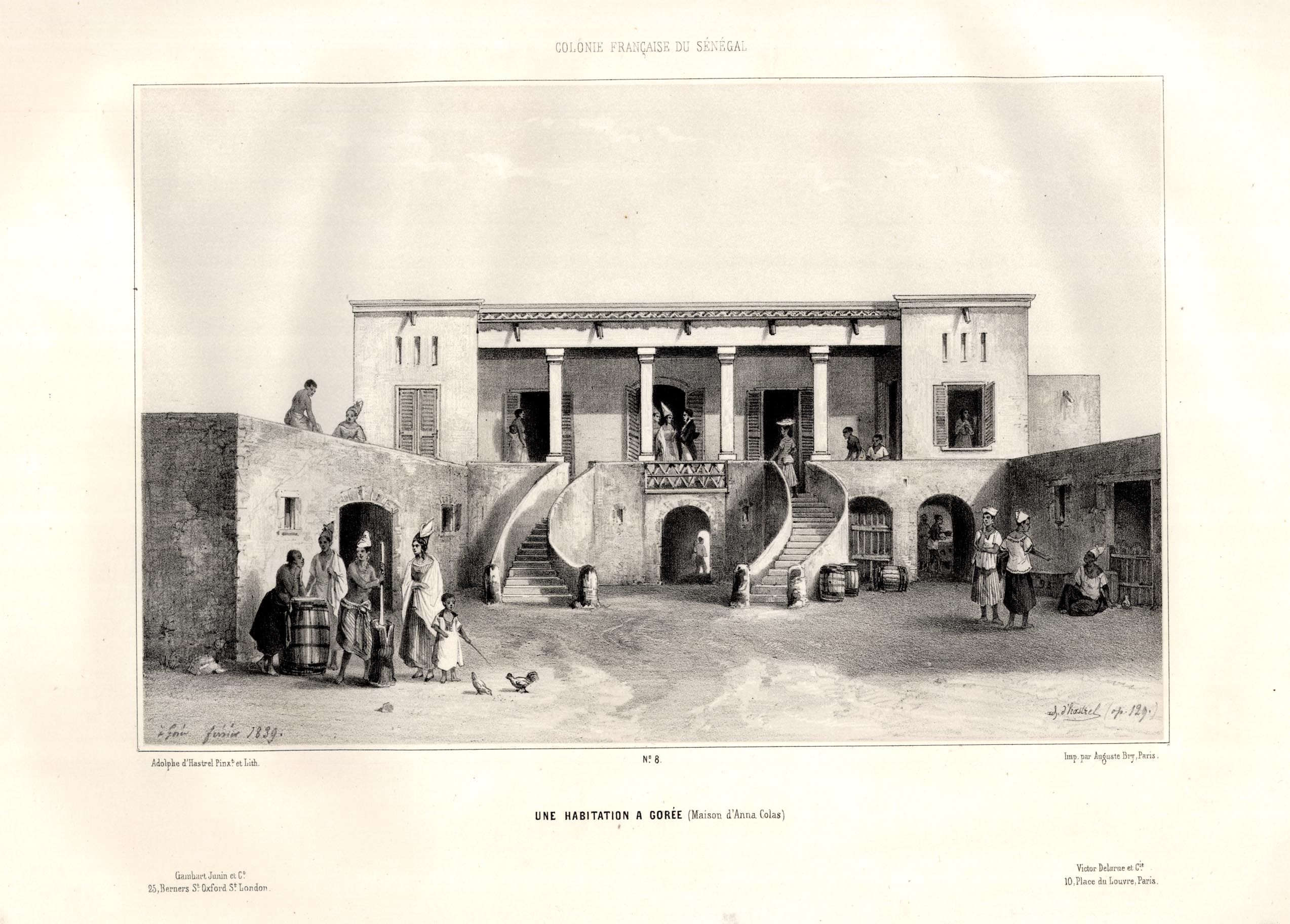
What is now the House of Slaves, depicted in this French 1839 print as the House of signare Anna Colas at Gorée, painted by d'Hastrel de Rivedoux.

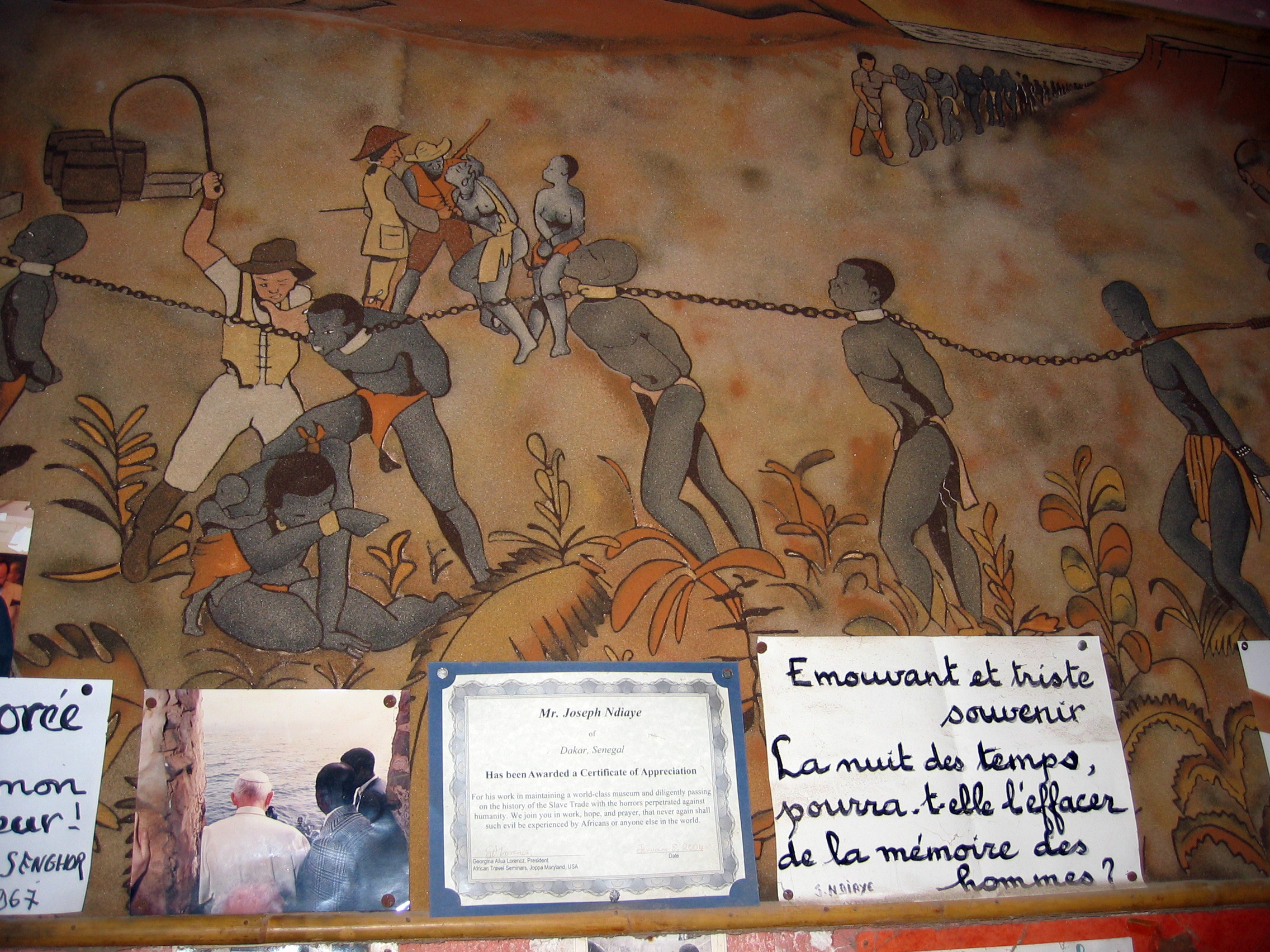
A wall in the Museum: a mural depicting slaves being herded in the African bush by Europeans, a photo of Joseph Ndiaye with Pope John Paul II, a certificate from a US travel agency, and an aphorism – one of many that cover the walls – by Ndiaye. This one reads Moving and sad memory / Night of times / How will it be erased from the memory of Men?.

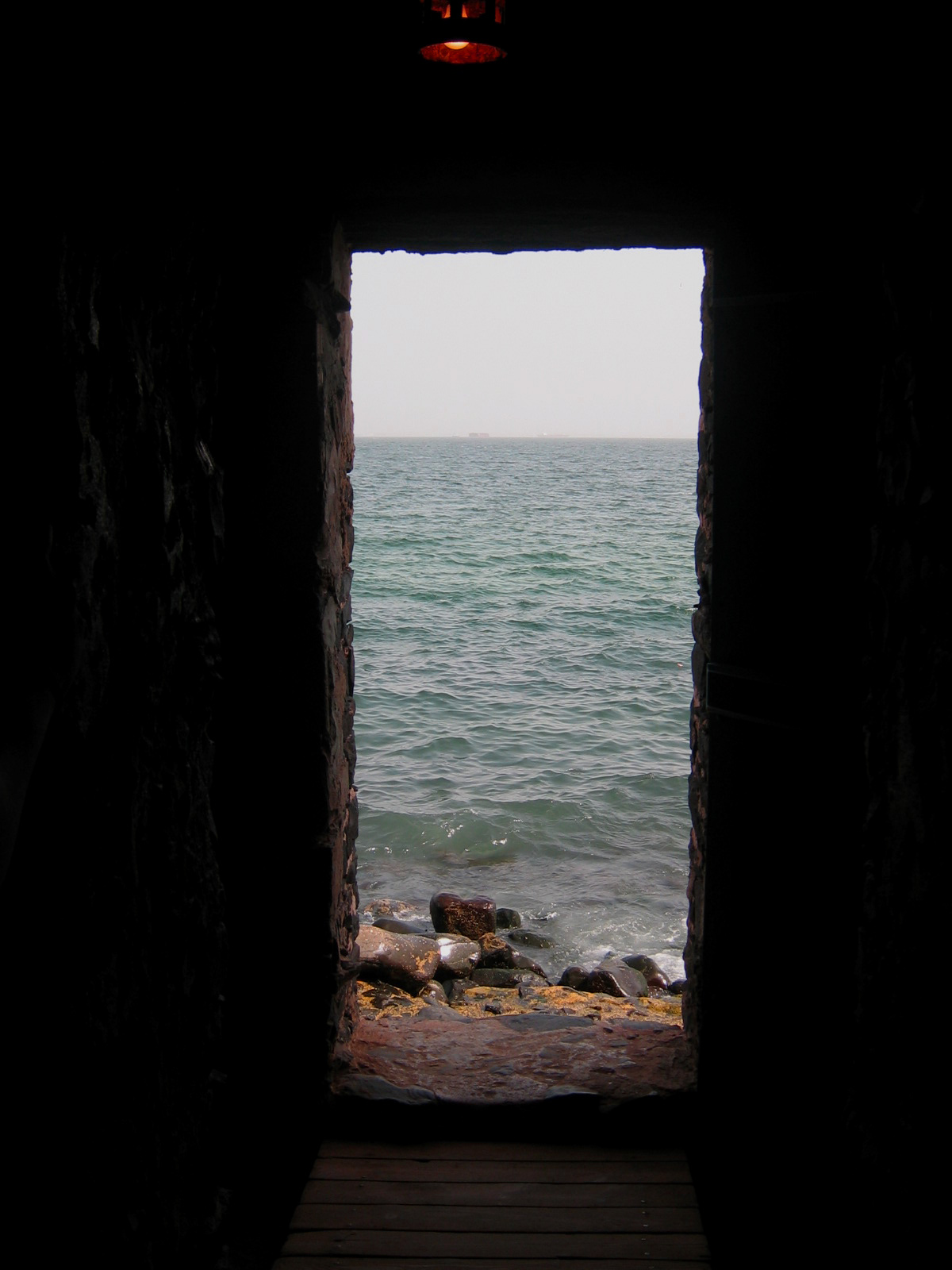
Door of No Return

The building was constructed around 1776 by Nicolas Pépin, brother of the influential signare Anne Pépin. The House is more associated with Nicolas's daughter, Anna Colas Pépin, a signare who lived in the home in the early 19th century. Senegalese signares were wealthy, colonial women traders. The Pépin family owned several ships and participated in the slave trade, with the house being used as a holding center to export enslaved Africans.

Conditions in the building were harrowing, with many of the imprisoned perishing before they reached the ships. Captured enslaved people "were imprisoned in dark, airless cells", and "spent days shackled to the floor, their backs against the walls, unable to move." Families were separated both at the House, with men, women, and children being held in separate quarters, as well as after boarding the ships, since most of them were not sent to the same locations. Young girls, in particular, were held separately from the rest of the imprisoned, being "paraded in the courtyard so that the traders and enslavers could choose them for sex"; if they became pregnant, they were allowed to remain on the island until they gave birth.

== Memorial ==
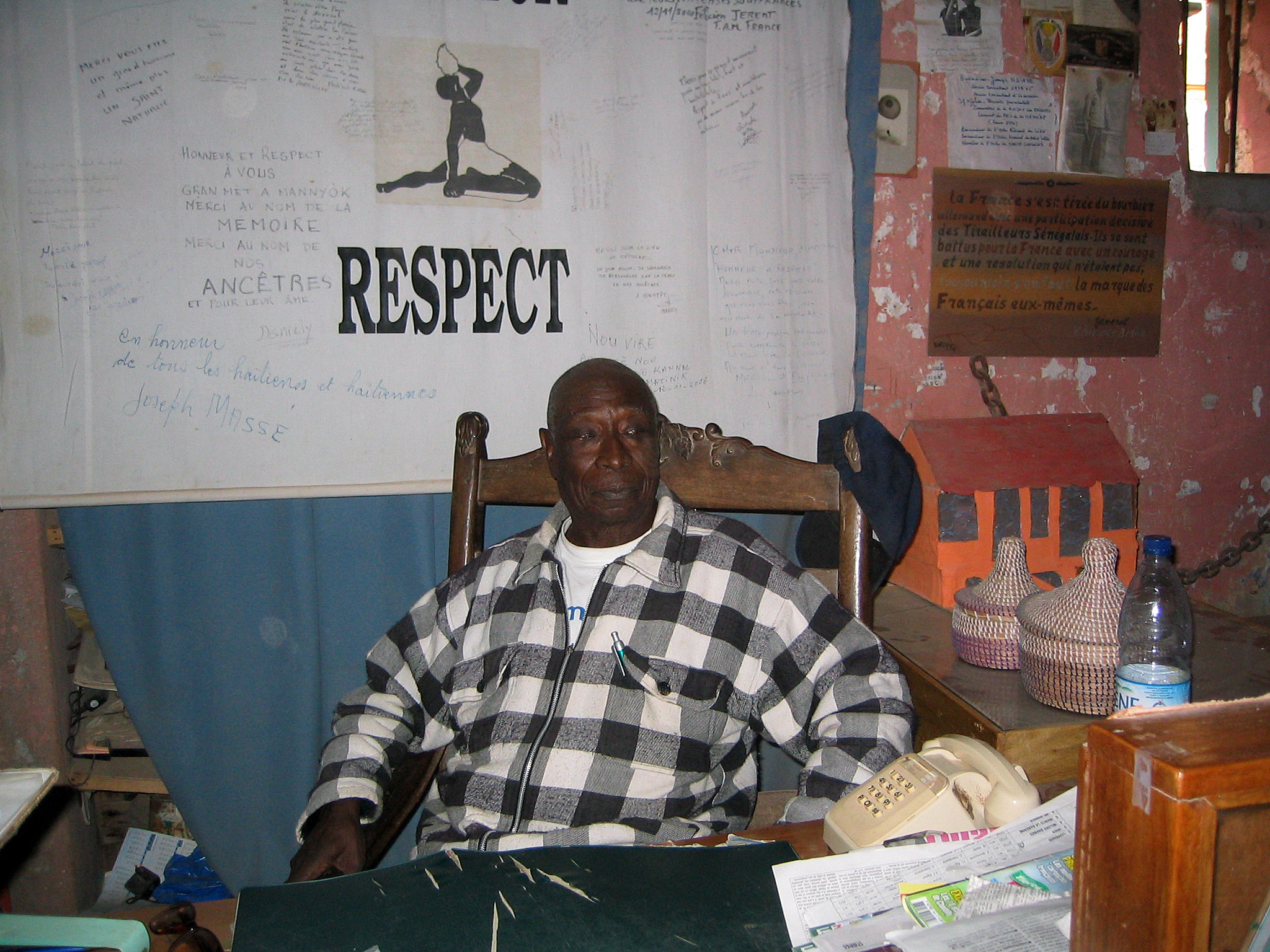
Boubacar Joseph N'Diaye, the curator of the Museum of Slavery in Island of Gorée, Senegal, 2007

In 1962, the House of Slaves was reconstructed and opened as a museum, largely through the work of Boubacar Joseph Ndiaye (1922–2009). Ndiaye was an advocate of the belief that Gorée, and the House, was a significant keystone in the slave trade to the Americas. Eventually becoming curator of the Museum, Ndiaye claimed that more than a million enslaved people passed through the doors of the house. This belief has made the house both a tourist attraction and a site for state visits by world leaders to Senegal.

== Academic controversy ==
Historians have argued that it is unlikely that many enslaved people actually walked through the Door, and that Gorée itself was marginal to the Atlantic slave trade. Ndiaye and other Senegalese have always claimed that the site is more than a memorial and is an actual historic site in the transport of Africans to European colonies in the Americas, and is underappreciated by Anglophone researchers.

Researchers argue that while the houseowner may have sold small numbers of enslaved people (kept in the now reconstructed basement cells) and kept a few domestic enslaved people, the actual point of departure was 300m away at a fort on the beach. Despite the purported significance of Gorée Island, some historians have made claim that only 26,000 enslaved Africans were recorded as having passed through the island, of total the unknown number of slaves that were exported from Africa. Ndiaye and supporters have submitted that there is evidence, the building itself, was originally built to hold a large number of enslaved people, and that as many as 15 million people passed through this particular Door of No Return.

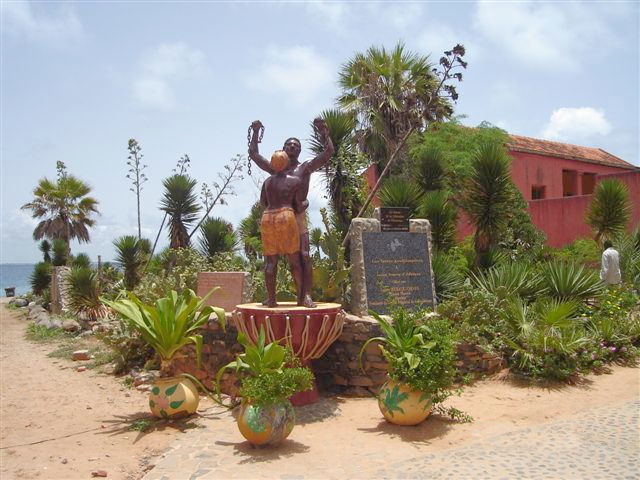
Statues and plaque at the Maison des Esclaves Memorial (2006).

Academic accounts, such as the 1969 statistical work of historian Philip D. Curtin, argue that enforced transports from Gorée began around 1670 and continued until about 1810, at no time more than 200 to 300 a year in important years and none at all in others. Curtin's 1969 accounting of enforced trade statistics records that between 1711 and 1810 180,000 enslaved Africans were transported from the French posts in Senegambia, most being transported from Saint-Louis, Senegal, and James Fort in modern Gambia. Curtin has been quoted as stating that the actual doorway memorialised likely had no historical significance, due to the fact that it was built in the late 1770s and "late in the era [of slave trading] to be of much importance", with Britain and the United States both abolishing the slave trade in 1807.

Other academics have also pointed out that Curtin did not account for the number of individuals who died during transport or shortly after their capture, which could have added significantly to his estimate. In response to these figures, popularly rejected by much of the Senegalese public, an African historical conference in 1998 claimed that records from the French trading houses of Nantes documented 103,000 slaves being from Gorée on Nantes-owned ships from 1763 to 1775. However, the evidence for this claim was a document that cited 103,000 enslaved Africans being taken from the larger region of Upper Guinea on the whole, not Gorée specifically. Ana Lucia Araujo has stated "it's not a real place from where real people left in the numbers they say".

Even those who argue Gorée was never important in the slave trade view the island as an important memorial to a trade that was carried on in greater scale from ports in modern Ghana and Benin.

== Tourism ==
Despite the controversy, the Maison des Esclaves is a central part of the Gorée Island UNESCO World Heritage site, named in 1978, and a major draw for foreign tourists to Senegal. Only 20 minutes by ferry from the city centre of Dakar, 200,000 visitors a year pass through the Museum here. Many, especially those descended from enslaved Africans, describe highly emotional reactions to the place, and the pervasive influence of Ndiaye's interpretation of the historical significance of the building: especially the Door of No Return through which Ndiaye argued millions of enslaved Africans left the continent for the last time. Before his death in 2008, Ndiaye would personally lead tours through basement cells, out through the Door of No Return, and hold up to tourists iron shackles, like those used to bind enslaved Africans. Since the publication of Alex Haley's novel Roots: The Saga of an American Family in 1976, African American tourists from the United States have made the Museum a focal point, often a highly emotion laden one, of pilgrimages hoping to reconnect with their traditional African heritage.

Famous world figures who have toured the Maison des Esclaves during their visits to Senegal includes Pope John Paul II, Nelson Mandela, Michael Jackson, and Barack Obama. Mandela was reported to have stepped away from a tour where he sat alone in a basement cell for five minutes silently reflecting on his visit in 1997. Obama toured The Door of No Return on his visit in 2013.

== See also ==
- Diaspora tourism
- Door of Return
- Genealogy tourism (Africa)
- Year of Return, Ghana 2019
- Door of No Return, Ouidah
