= National history museum =

A national history museum or national historical museum is a history museum dedicated to presenting artifacts and exhibits reflecting the history of a particular nation, usually its home country. The earliest public museums, the Ashmolean Museum in Oxford and the Louvre Museum in Paris, were focused on natural history and art, respectively, and not necessarily on subjects related to the history of any nation. Following Napoleon's use of the Louvre as a center of national pride during his reign, other countries began to use museums not just to store artifacts of aesthetic or educational value, but to portray the country itself in a positive light.

Historically, some national history museums have been used purely as propaganda tools through which governments attempt to convey an official history. For example, "the Nazi regime employed the museum as a deliberate tool of propaganda and 'public education'". It has further been argued that "the very idea of an officially sponsored national history museum is simply outdated" in light of the trend towards pluralistic interpretation of artifacts. On the other hand, it has been argued that: "To create a national history museum that discards unitary national narratives as well as causal trajectories (the teleology of the nation)—in effect to subvert the form—is probably impossible". One concern of national history museums, therefore, is how to fairly and neutrally depict negative periods in a nation's own history.

== Examples ==
National history museums include:

- Natural History Museum, London
- Canadian Museum of History
- Hungarian National Museum
- National History Museum in Slovakia, see Trebišov
- National History Museum (1949-1959) in Beijing, see National Museum of China
- National History Museum in India, part of the Government Museum and Art Gallery, Chandigarh
- Museo Histórico Nacional (Chile)
- Museo Nacional de Historia, Mexico
- National History Museum (Malaysia)
- National Historical Museum (Albania)
- National Historical Museum (Argentina)
- National Historical Museum (Brazil)
- National Historical Museum (Bulgaria)
- National Historical Museum (Greece)
- National Historical Museum of Ukraine
- National Museum of American History, established in 1964 as the Museum of History and Technology, and renamed in 1980.
- St Fagans National History Museum in Wales

== See also ==
- National memorial museum
- List of national museums
- List of museums
