= Memorial museum =

Type of museum

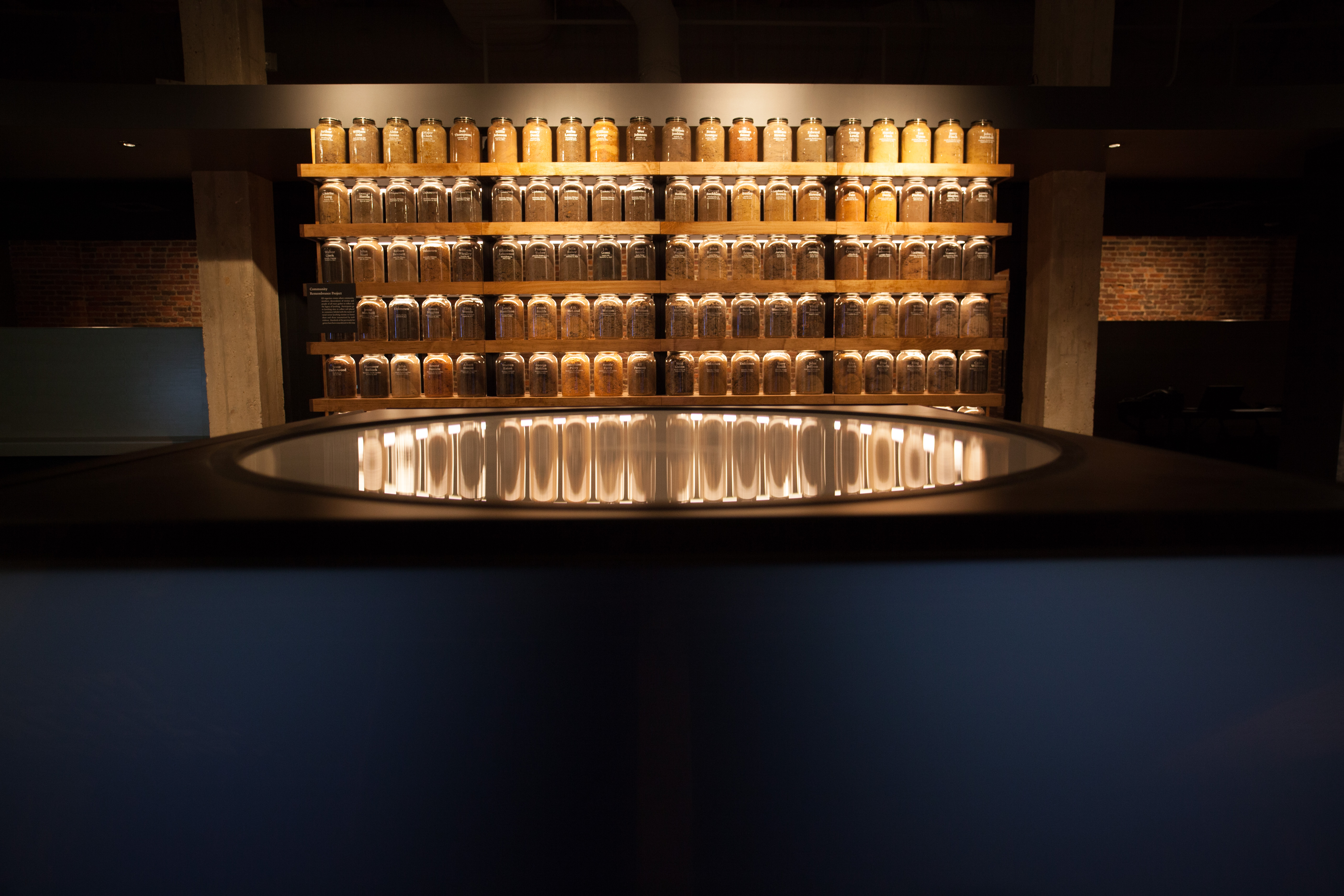
The Legacy Museum chronicles the history of racial injustice in America

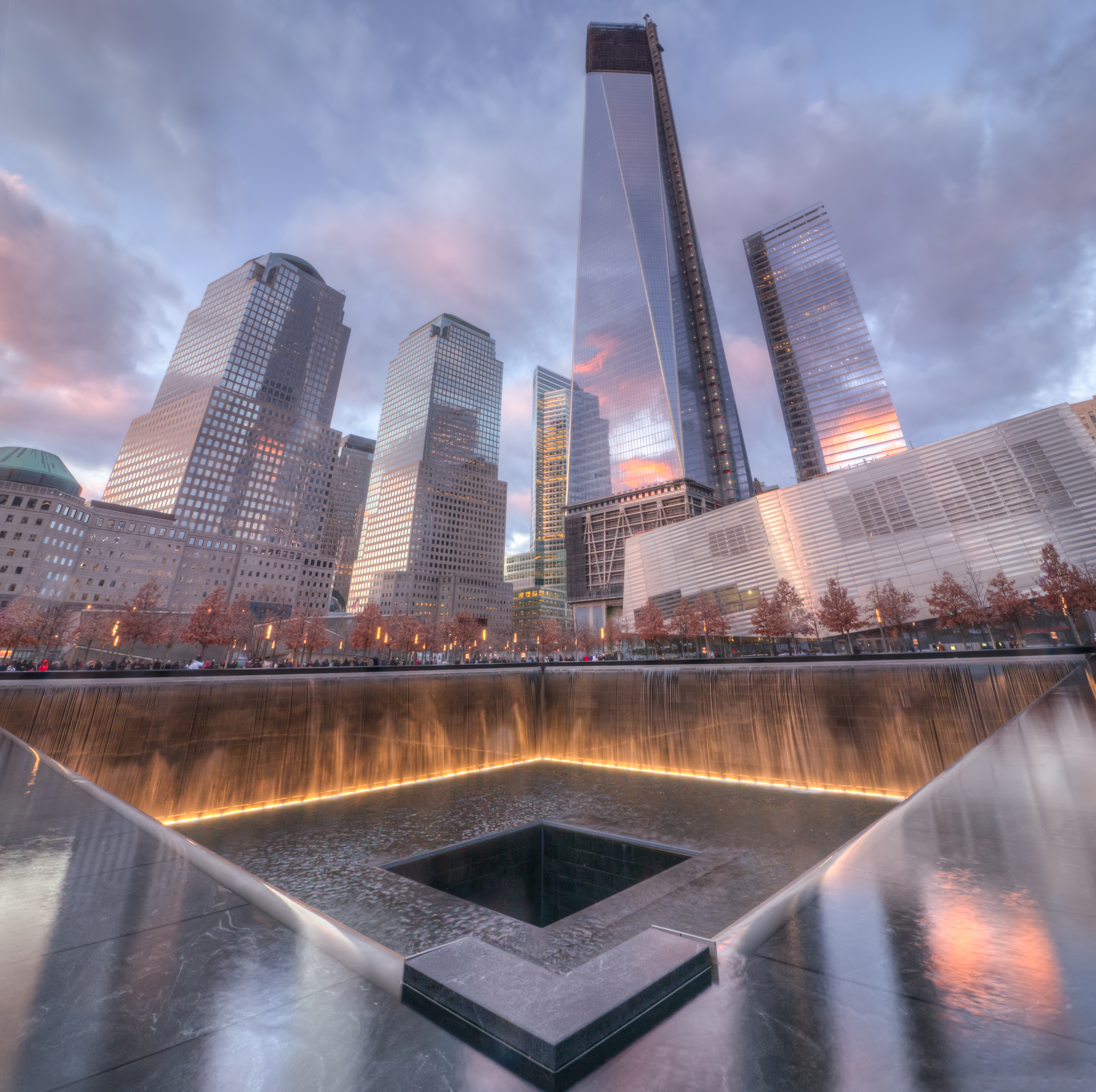
National September 11 Memorial & Museum in New York City

Memorial museums are museums dedicated both to educating the public about and commemorating a specific historic event, usually involving mass suffering. The concept gained traction throughout the 20th century as a response to the numerous and well publicized mass atrocities committed during that century. The events commemorated by memorial museums tend to involve mostly civilian victims who died under "morally problematic circumstances" that cannot easily be interpreted as heroic. There are frequently unresolved issues concerning the identity, culpability, and punishment of the perpetrators of these killings and memorial museums often play an active research role aimed at benefiting both the victims and those prosecuting the perpetrators.

Today there are numerous memorial museums including the United States Holocaust Memorial Museum, the Toul Sleng Museum of Genocidal Crimes in Phnom Penh, Cambodia, the District Six Museum in Cape Town, South Africa, the Armenian Genocide Memorial complex in Yerevan, Armenia, and the National September 11 Memorial & Museum in New York City. Although the concept of a memorial museum is largely a product of the 20th century, there are museums of this type that focus on events from other periods, an example being the House of Slaves (Maisons des Esclaves) in Senegal which was declared a UNESCO World Heritage Site in 1978 and acts as a museum and memorial to the Atlantic slave trade.

Memorial museums differ from traditional history museums in several key ways, most notably in their dual mission to incorporate both a moral framework for and contextual explanations of an event. While traditional history museums tend to be in neutral institutional settings, memorial museums are very often situated at the scene of the atrocity they seek to commemorate. Memorial museums also often have close connections with, and advocate for, a specific clientele who have a special relationship to the event or its victims, such as family members or survivors, and regularly hold politically significant special events. Unlike many traditional history museums, memorial museums almost always have a distinct, overt political and moral message with direct ties to contemporary society. A national memorial museum is typically managed in an official capacity by a government body, as is the case with the National Showa Memorial Museum in Tokyo. The following mission statement of the United States Holocaust Memorial Museum is typical in its focus on commemoration, education and advocacy:

The museum's primary mission is to advance and disseminate knowledge about this unprecedented tragedy; to preserve the memory of those who suffered; and to encourage its visitors to reflect upon the moral and spiritual questions raised by the events of the Holocaust as well as their own responsibilities as citizens of a democracy.

== Ethical Responsibilities ==
Memorial museums are entrusted with the dignity of victims and the accurate representation of history. International charters, such as the International Memorial Museums Charter, outline principles to avoid exploitation or politicization of victims’ memories and to promote critical, independent thinking about the past. These guidelines encourage collaboration among memorial museums worldwide and emphasize the protection of human and civil rights.
