= American International School of Accra =

International school in Accra, Ghana

Coordinates: 5.633575°N 0.149452°W

Location
- Legon, Accra; Ghana

Information
- School type: International School
- Established: 2006; 19 years ago
- Grades: Pre-Kindergarten - Grade 12
- Enrollment: c.275
- Language: English
- Website: https://www.aisghana.org/

American International School — Ghana (AIS), was founded in 2006 to provide quality education for the international community. Located in East Legon, Accra, Ghana, AIS offers limited bus service from the Cantonments and Labone areas of Accra. Recently it has been authorized as an IB World School — offering the premier IB Diploma Program from the 2024-2025 academic year.

American International School is a private, co-educational, faith-based school for students from Pre-Kindergarten through 12th grade. AIS has a student body of approximately 275, representing over 35+ nationalities.

== Curriculum and academic Services ==
AIS offers a four-way track for its students; courses are offered at Standard Level (SL), Higher Level (HL), and Advanced Placement (AP) and the IB Diploma Program (IBDP). Standardized testing is administered to 1st-12th grade each year. The High School program follows a credit system culminating in students earning an American High School diploma. The level of academic rigor prepares students for admissions to quality universities around the world. The qualified, caring teachers and support staff are dedicated to guiding students academically and spiritually.

By limiting class size to less than 25 students, certified teachers are able to provide individualized instruction to students, who represent more than 35 countries. AIS currently offers standard academic curriculum as well as PE, Music, Art, French and the support of a Resource Room. High-school students have the opportunity to participate in Drama, Music Seminars and Model UN with other area schools. AIS is moving to facilitate technology in the classroom as well as developing sports programs for soccer, basketball and swimming. AIS has purchased property very near the present campus and plans to build a full service campus with swimming pool, basketball and soccer pitch.

The school offers Advanced Placement (AP) courses, and the International Baccalaureate Diploma Program (IBDP). AIS is an official College Board SAT, PSAT and AP testing center and facilitates SAT exam prep for 11th and 12th grade students, as well as the PSAT test administration for all 8th-11th grade students. AIS is a partner school of SevenStar and Pamoja online school. English Language Learning (ELL) and Exceptional Student Services (ESS) are provided for students as needed.

== Accreditation and membership ==
AIS was approved for candidacy by the Middle States Association of Colleges and Schools (MSA) and by the Association of Christian Schools International (ACSI) in May 2009. AIS has dual accreditation from both the Middle States Association of Colleges and Schools, and the Association of Christian Schools International. AIS is an official member of the Association of International Schools in Africa.

== See also ==
- African-Americans in Ghana
