= Afrochic Diaspora Festival =

Annual multi-disciplinary arts festival

Afrochic Diaspora Festival is an annual multi-disciplinary arts festival created in 2010 by Amoye Henry, Natassia Parson-Morris, Natasha Morris, and Nijha Frederick-Allen to highlight the culture and artistic expression of the African-Canadian community within and around Toronto. The annual music festival highlights the young and emerging talent from Canadians of African descent through visual arts, fashion, and music.

== Notable headliners ==
- Erykah Badu
- 11:11
- Shi Wisdom
- Spek Won
- Leila Dey
- Jidenna
- Wale
- Teedra Moses
- Stacey Mckenzie
- Issa Rae

== Known hosts ==
- Amanda Parris
- Alicia ‘Ace’ West
- Nigel D. Birch
- Femi Lawson
- Kim Katrin Milan

== Partners ==
- Aurora Cannabis Inc
- Year of Return, Ghana 2019
