= Slave History Museum =

Museum in Calabar, Nigeria

Coordinates: 4°57′59.2″N 8°19′6.9″E

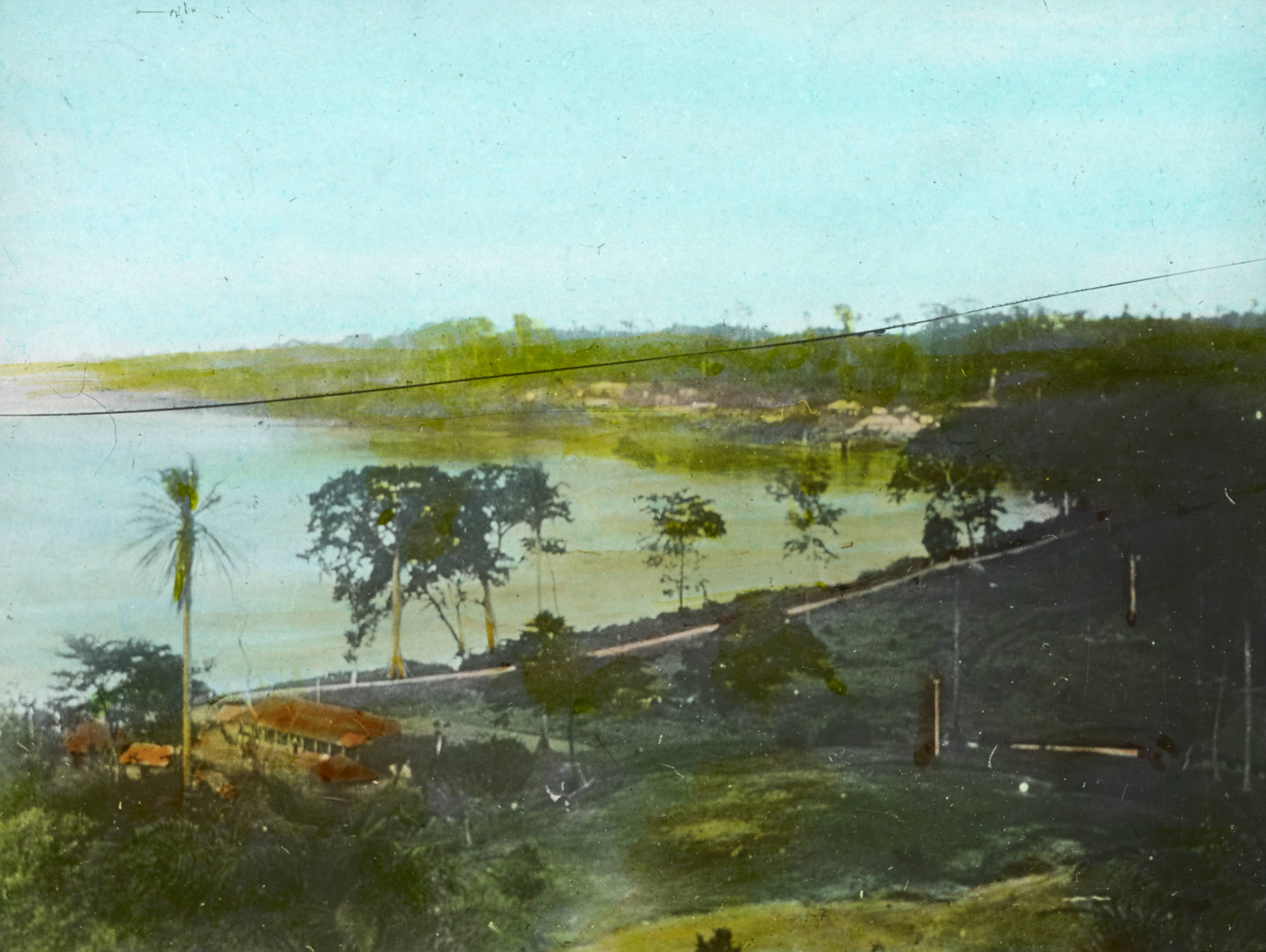
Site of a slave market at Akpabuyo in the Calabar area, featured in a major exhibit of the museum

The Slave History Museum is a museum in the Nigerian city of Calabar, which was a major embarkation port of the African Slave Trade, about 200,000 Africans being sold as slaves from Calabar between 1662 and 1863.

Established in 2007 and opened on 17 March 2011, the museum was established as a tourism initiative by the Cross River State and is directly managed by the Nigerian National Commission for Museums and Monuments. It is located at the site of a fifteenth-century slave-trading warehouse in Marina Beach (Marina Resort). The building which houses the museum is a former barracoon (holding cell for slaves).

The museum was established to bring the history of the slave trade to more people and in a more immediate manner than historical writing alone. Several scholars participated in the design of the museum, and oral as well as written sources were consulted. It includes biographies of individuals involved in the trade (victims, slavers, and others). Major exhibits include:

- Esuk Mba Slave Market in Akpabuyo, which describes that market, where new captives from the hinterland (typically but not always prisoners of war) were sold into the slave trading system.
- Chains and Shackles, which includes artifacts of slaving such as various restraints.
- Procurement of Slaves, which shows examples of the varied kinds of money and material exchanged for slaves, such as copper bars, guns, bronze bells, and so forth.
- Shipment of Slaves, which shows how slave ships were loaded with closely packed human cargo.
- Abolition, which describes the efforts of British activists who pushed for outlawing the slave trade, which became illegal on 1 May 1807.

The Shipment of Slaves exhibit includes a demonstration, with life-size figures, of shackled slaves packed sardine-style into a slaveship.

Recent initiatives such as the Goethe-Institut's Connecting the Dots program signals renewed interest in activating the museum as a living space for discussion.
