= Door of No Return, Ouidah =

Slavery memorial in Ouidah, Benin

Door of No Return
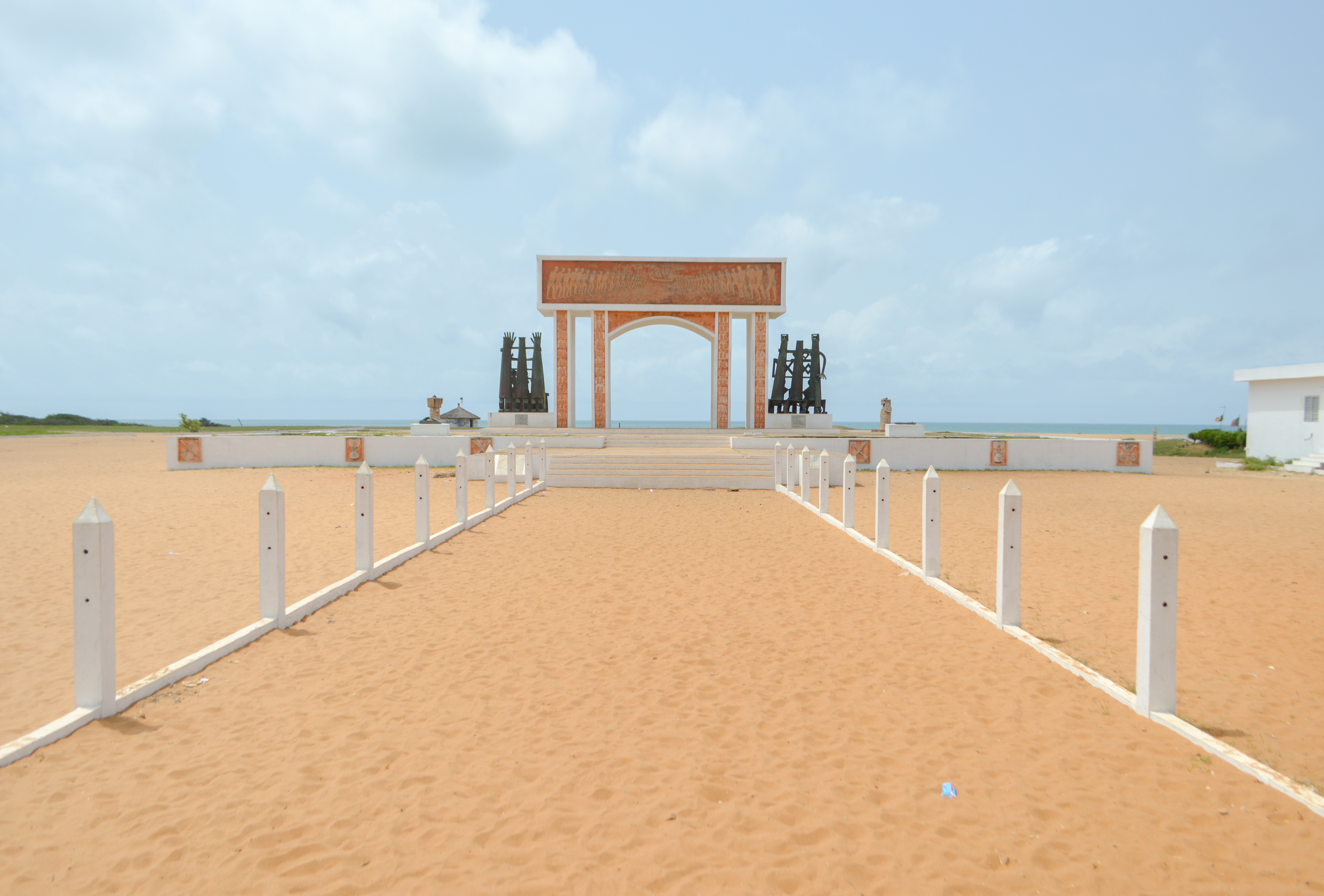
- Door of No Return, Ouidah
- Location: Ouidah, Benin
- Designer: Yves Ahouen-Gnimon, Fortune Bandeira, Yves Kpede, Dominque Kouas Gnonnou
- Type: Memorial arch
- Material: concrete, bronze
- Dedicated to: Victims of the Atlantic slave trade

The Door of No Return is a memorial arch in Ouidah, Benin. The concrete and bronze arch, which stands on the beach, is a memorial to the enslaved Africans who were taken from the slave port of Ouidah to the Americas.

Several artists and designers collaborated with the architect, Yves Ahouen-Gnimon, to realise the project. The columns and bas-reliefs are by Beninese artist Fortuné Bandeira, the freestanding Egungun are by Yves Kpede and the bronzes are by Dominque Kouas Gnonnou.

The memorial site is composed of six main stages, all strongly related to the voodoo culture:

- Plaza Chacha: Slave auction plaza
- Tree of Oblivion: Tree circled by slaves to forget their origins
- Zomai House: Where slaves resided awaiting to be shipped out of Africa
- Memorial of Zoungbodji: Mass graveyard where dead slaves were thrown
- Tree of Return: Allow for souls to return

== See also ==
- Door of Return
- Genealogy tourism (Africa)
- Year of Return, Ghana 2019
