= Marina Resort =

Tourist centre in Cross River State, Nigeria

Coordinates: 4°57′54″N 8°19′2″E

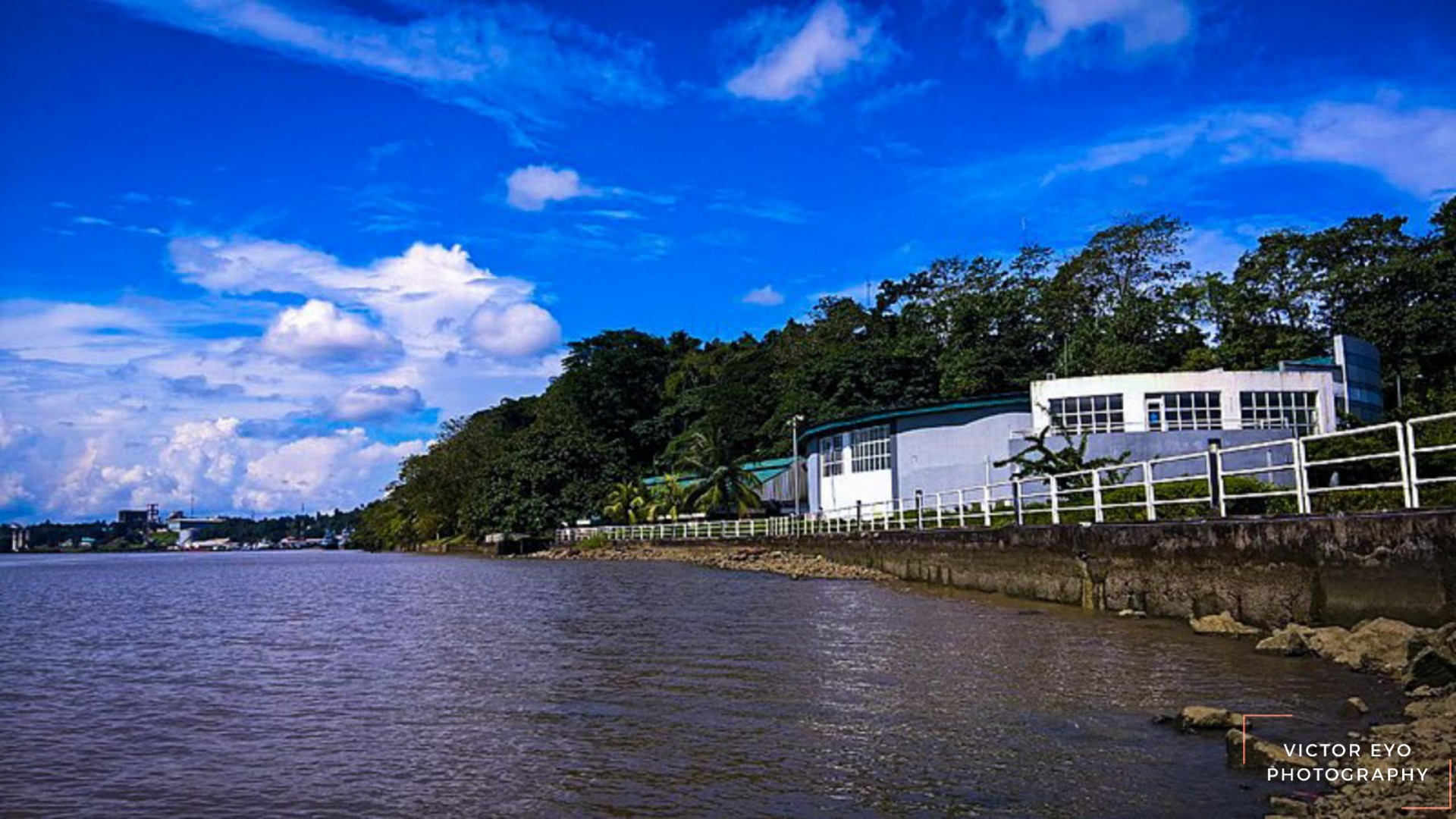
A landscape view of Marina Resort in Calabar, Nigeria, with the Calabar River and former filmhouse Cinema in view. 2016

Marina Resort is a recreational and historical destination in Calabar, the capital city of Cross River State, Nigeria. It was built on May 26, 2007, by former governor Donald Duke, to promote tourism in the state. The resort features a variety of attractions, such as a slave history museum, a cinema, a restaurant, a bar, and a waterfront area.

== History ==
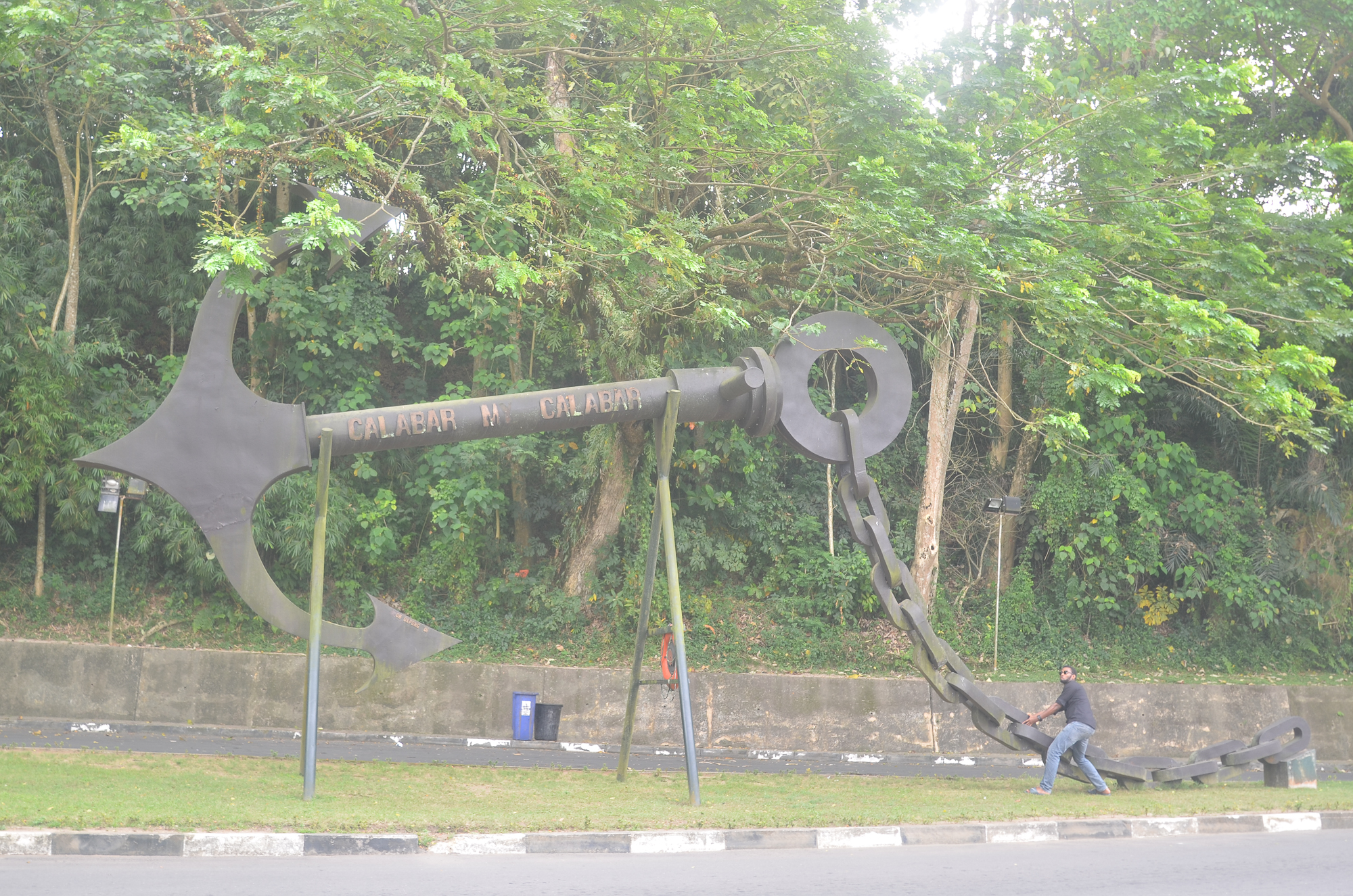
Anchor at Marina resort. 2017

Marina Resort was inaugurated on May 26, 2007, by former governor Donald Duke, as part of his vision to transform Calabar into a tourist hub. The resort was built on the site of a former slave port, where thousands of Africans were shipped across the Atlantic Ocean during the transatlantic slave trade. The resort aims to preserve the memory of the slave trade and its impact on the region, as well as to provide a relaxing and entertaining place for visitors.

== Boat accident and temporary closure ==
On June 24, 2023, a tragic boat accident occurred at Marina Resort, involving 14 medical students who had boarded a cruise boat. The boat capsized resulting in the death of three students and the rescue of 11 others. The governor of Cross River State, Bassey Otu, ordered an immediate suspension of all cruise boat operations and other activities at the resort.

== Reopening ==
On September 6, 2023, Marina Resort reopened to the public after being closed for over two months due to a boat accident that claimed the lives of three medical students.

== See also ==
- List of tourist attractions in Nigeria
