= National memorial museum =

A national memorial museum is an official or semi-official institution administered or oversighted by a governmental body, usually combining elements of a national memorial, a national museum, and a memorial museum. Specifically, it could refer to:

== Australia ==
- Royal Australian Armoured Corps Memorial and Army Tank Museum

== India ==
- Indian War Memorial Museum
- National Gandhi Museum

== Japan ==
- Hiroshima Peace Memorial Museum
- National Showa Memorial Museum

== Namibia ==
- Independence Memorial Museum (Namibia)

== Norway ==
- Lofoten War Memorial Museum

== South Korea ==
- National Memorial Museum of Forced Mobilization under Japanese Occupation

== Sri Lanka ==
- Independence Memorial Museum

== Taiwan ==
- Yu Da Wei Xian Sheng Memorial Museum

== Thailand ==
- National Memorial (Thailand) – a museum

== Ukraine ==
- National Museum of the History of Ukraine in the Second World War – a memorial complex

== United States ==
- African American Civil War Memorial Museum
- Federal Hall National Memorial
- National Churchill Museum
- National Guard Memorial Museum
- National Pulse Memorial and Museum
- National September 11 Memorial & Museum
- National Veterans Memorial and Museum
- National World War I Museum and Memorial
- The National WWII Museum
- Oklahoma City National Memorial Museum
- Pearl Harbor National Memorial – includes the USS Bowfin museum and Pearl Harbor Aviation Museum within the nearby naval station complex
- Soldiers and Sailors Memorial Hall and Museum
- Wright Brothers National Memorial – includes a visitor center and museum

== See also ==
- List of Holocaust memorials and museums
- List of Holodomor memorials and museums
- List of military museums
- List of national memorials of the United States
- List of national museums
- List of presidential libraries
- List of slavery-related memorials and museums
- Lists of monuments and memorials
- Lists of war monuments and memorials
