= Torrey George McCallum =

Mississippi politician (1873–1947)

Torrey George McCallum (March 1, 1873 – February 1947) was a politician in the United States. He served as mayor of Laurel, Mississippi and was a state senator in the Mississippi Senate. He proposed legislation to send African Americans "back" to Africa, which was passed by the Senate on February 20, 1922.

He was born in Jasper County, Mississippi. He was Presbyterian.
