= Detty December (Ghana) =

Cultural and festive phenomenon

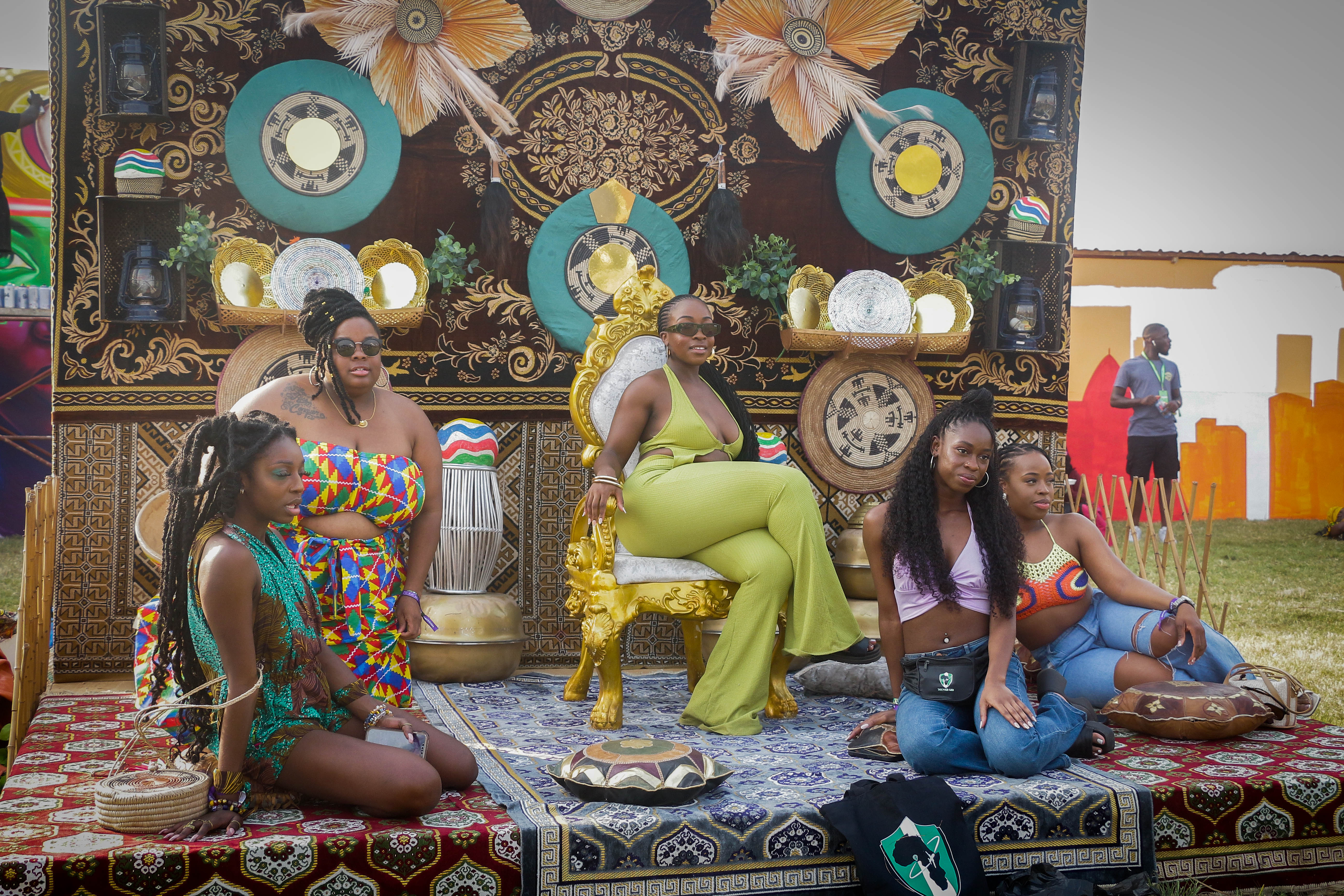
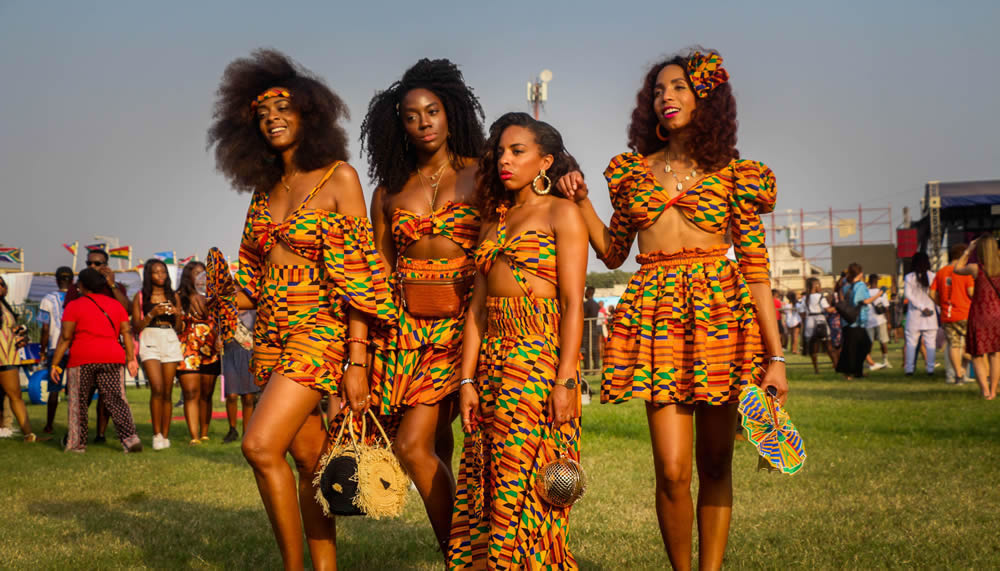
Some Black diasporans at Afrochella Festival in Ghana

December In Ghana, colloquially referred to as Detty December (#dettydecember), is a cultural and festive phenomenon that gained prominence alongside the "Year of Return” initiative launched by the government of Ghana in 2019. It refers to the year-end festivities, typically observed from mid-December through the New Year.

This tradition, rooted in the country's history of attracting the global African diaspora, has evolved into a significant cultural and economic event, drawing millions of visitors each year.

== Etymology ==
While the exact origin of the term "Detty December" remains uncertain, "Detty" is derived from a variation of the word "dirty." This adaptation symbolizes a readiness to embrace unrestrained enjoyment and partake in festivities with exuberance. Over time, this expression has become synonymous with the cultural celebrations observed in Accra during the month of December.

== History and origins ==
Prior to the popularization of the term "Detty December," Ghanaians abroad traditionally visited their homeland during the festive season, a cherished practice for many families. However, the concept took on a new dimension with the Year of Return, which marked the 400th anniversary of the arrival of enslaved Africans in North America. This initiative, aiming to reconnect people of African descent with their roots, inadvertently birthed the tradition of "Detty December" as a cultural pilgrimage to Ghana during the months of December.

== Impact and revenues ==
Since the inception of the Year of Return, Ghana has experienced a surge in tourism and economic growth. In the year-long celebration, up to 1.5 million tourists, including celebrities, politicians, and world leaders, visited the country, contributing to an estimated revenue of up to $1.9 billion. The tourism sector witnessed an 18% growth in international arrivals from the Americas, Britain, the Caribbean, and other countries. The total airport arrivals increased by a staggering 45%, showcasing the substantial impact of the initiative on the nation's economy.

The estimated spending per tourist rose significantly from $1,862 in 2017 to the current figure of $2,589. This influx of revenue underscores the economic significance of Detty December and the Year of Return activities on the Ghanaian economy.

== Cultural highlights ==
Detty December is marked by a plethora of cultural events, concerts, and festivities. The cultural exchange between Ghanaians and the African diaspora is evident in the array of concerts, showcasing local and international talent. Numerous members of the African diaspora including Black Hollywood stars have been drawn to Ghana, participating in and contributing to the festivities.

Since 2022, Ghana has further facilitated this tradition by waiving visa requirements for all arrivals during the months of December and January.

== Detty December 2024 ==
The Ghana Tourism Authority waived a pre-approval visa-on-arrival requirement for visitors from December 1 to January 15 to experience Ghanaian culture.

=== Events ===
Events
Ghana Twitter (X) Awards - 13th
Tropical Jam Festival - 14th
Ghana To The Moon Festival - 14th
Bigger Than Us (Twitch) - 15th
Tanks And Bikinis - 15th
Kweku Smoke Revival - 18th
AratheJay Headline Show - 19th
Afro Dance Culture - 17th - 23rd
Crusade (Our Day) - 20th
Fameye Family Concert - 20th
Zaama Disco - 21st
Made In Taadi - 21st
Likor On The Beach (KiDi) - 22nd
After The Sunset - 22nd
Bhim Concert - 22nd
Efya In Concert - 23rd
Around The World - 25th
Rapperholic - 25th
Chop Bar Experience - 25th
Black Sherif In Berekum - 26th
Beyond Control Concert - 26th
Detty Rave - 27th
My Motherland - 28th
Afrofuture - 28th - 29th
Promise Land - 29th

== See also ==
- Kakum National Park
- National Theatre
- Kwame Nkrumah Museum
