= Alfred Sam =

Alfred Charles Sam (c. 1880 – 1930s?), known as Chief Alfred Sam, was a Gold Coast-born merchant and pioneer pan-Africanist who during 1913 to 1915 encouraged the resettlement of African Americans as part of the Back-to-Africa movement.

== Biography ==
He was born at Apaso (Appasu) in the West Akim district of the Gold Coast (now Ghana), and was educated at a mission school in Kyebi. He became a trader in rubber and other goods, and acquired the title of Chief either from an uncle (as he claimed), or as an honor to recognise that he had traveled to the US or the UK.

In May 1913, after corresponding with Herbert Macaulay in Nigeria and traveling to the US, he began holding large camp-style meetings in Weleetka Oklahoma and elsewhere, encouraging African Americans to buy $25 worth of stock in his Akim Trading Company, join a voyage to their "ancestral home", settle on fertile land that he claimed to have purchased there, reject America and live a life of freedom. His stated intentions were to help develop trade between West Africa and the United States, by selling commodities such as cocoa, coffee and mahogany to the US, and encouraging black American farmers and mechanics to settle in Africa and so develop the economy there. Among his claims were stories of "diamonds lying on the ground after a rain, trees that produced bread, and sugar cane as large as stove pipes". Although his scheme was criticized by black businesses and newspapers, and by the authorities, he was cleared of fraud. He was supported by the African Pioneer, a journal of the Back-to-Africa movement, and persuaded hundreds of families to sell their possessions and invest in his scheme.

By early 1914, some 500 black Americans were prepared to sail to Africa on Sam's ship, the former German steamer Curityba which he renamed the S.S. Liberia, and assembled at Galveston, Texas. An initial group of some sixty trained and selected men and women were eventually taken on board and left with Sam in August 1914, together with a cargo of lumber, cement, lime, flour, agricultural implements, and household goods with which to establish a settlement. They arrived in Bathurst (now Banjul), Gambia, in December 1914, and both there and in Freetown, Sierra Leone, received considerable publicity. After a long delay in Freetown while British authorities checked the ship's ownership, they eventually reached their destination, Saltpond, in January 1915, and were initially given a warm reception. However, their attempt to settle at Akim failed as local leaders refused to allow Americans to own the necessary land, and because of official restrictions, shortages of materials, and malaria. Many of the intending settlers suffered physical and financial hardships, were discouraged, and felt misled by Sam's claims. Some eventually returned to Oklahoma, while others settled in African cities or Liberia.

By September 1915, before a second voyage could take place, Sam's venture collapsed, with most of those still intending to make the voyage losing their possessions and savings. Sam sold the Liberia, and returned to work as a trader. Sources give differing accounts of his later life, with one stating that he also moved to Liberia, while others indicate that he returned to live in the US, living the remainder of his life as a cocoa buyer. It is thought that he died sometime during the 1930s.
