= Esuk Mba Slave Market =

Market located in Akpabuyo, Cross River State, Nigeria

Esuk Mba Slave Market was a slave trade center between the 15th and 19th centuries, located in Akpabuyo, Cross River State, Nigeria. It was one of several markets in the region that facilitated the transatlantic slave trade. The market served as a hub where enslaved individuals from the hinterlands were gathered, sold, and transported to coastal ports for export to Europe.

== Historical background ==
The Esuk Mba Slave Market operated during the height of the transatlantic slave trade, from the 15th to the 19th centuries. Local traders and intermediaries captured and sold individuals to European merchants in exchange for goods such as firearms, textiles, and brass. The market was strategically located along the Cross River, allowing for easy transportation of captives by canoe or land routes to major slave depots like Calabar, which was one of West Africa's key slave-exporting ports.

== Abolition and legacy ==
Following the British abolition of the transatlantic slave trade in 1807 and the enforcement of anti-slavery laws, the Esuk Mba Slave Market declined. British naval patrols along the West African coast disrupted slave trading networks, leading to the closure of many inland markets.

Today, Esuk Mba has gained attention for continuing a trade by barter system, where goods are exchanged without the use of money. This practice reflects traditional economic systems that predate colonial influence. Local traders engage in barter transactions involving foodstuffs, livestock, and household items. This system has been maintained as part of the cultural heritage of the people of Esuk Mba.
