= Tree of Life, Monument of Awareness =

2003 monument in Amsterdam, Netherlands

Coordinates: 52°21′30.9″N 4°51′8.35″E

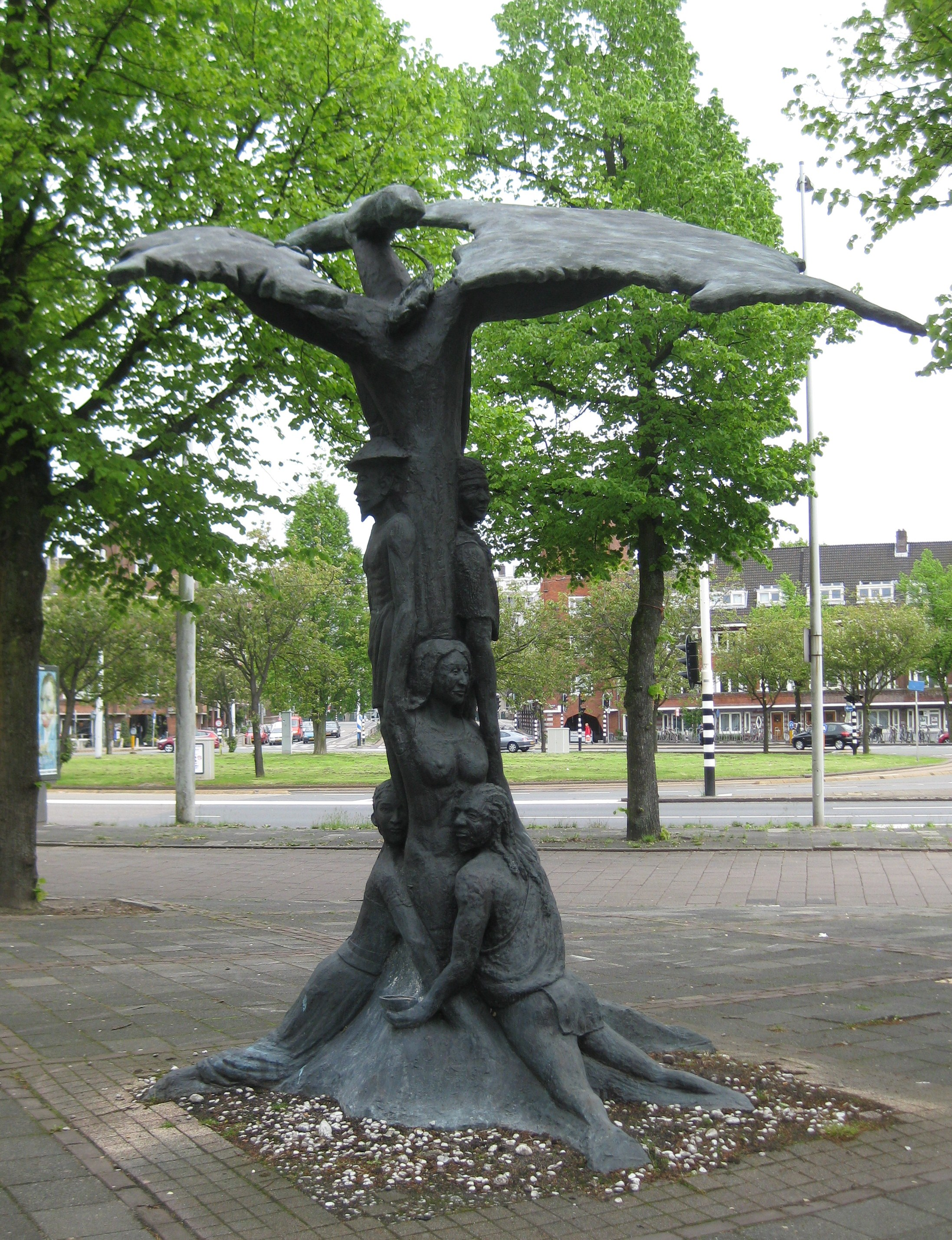
Tree of Life, Monument of Awareness

The Tree of Life, Monument of Awareness (Bon Fu Gron Prakseri) is a monument located at Surinameplein in Amsterdam-West, commemorating the history of slavery, the abolition of slavery, and the solidarity among the countries that were part of the Kingdom of the Netherlands. The monument was designed by Henry Renfurm. It was unveiled on June 30, 2003.

== History ==
On July 1, 1863, slavery was abolished in the Kingdom of the Netherlands through the Emancipation Act, affecting Suriname and the Caribbean islands of Aruba, Bonaire, Curaçao, Sint Eustatius, Sint Maarten, and Saba. To commemorate this, people have gathered annually since 1993 at Surinameplein in Amsterdam on June 30 for a ceremony called the National Day of Awareness. One of the initiators was journalist and broadcaster Roy Ristie from the Comité 30 juni/1 juli in Amsterdam. The committee, in line with the Comité 4 and 5 May, chose June 30 as a day of reflection and July 1 as a day of celebration.

The Tree of Life was unveiled a year after the National Slavery Monument was unveiled on July 1, 2002, in Oosterpark in Amsterdam. The Comité 30 juni/1 juli Amsterdam found the location in Oosterpark unsuitable and thus worked towards establishing the Tree of Life, Monument of Awareness at Surinameplein, where the annual commemoration had already been held for ten years. In other municipalities, 30 June/1 July committees have also been established to organize activities leading up to or on June 30 and July 1.

== Design and symbolism ==
The monument's design emerged from ideas contributed by people from various communities. The tree of life symbolizes the desire to move forward together. The trunk of the tree represents the ethnic diversity of the community, and the foliage symbolizes the respective countries and their interconnectedness.

On the Day of Awareness, two minutes of silence are observed, speeches are given, and wreaths are laid.

== See also ==
- List of slavery monuments in the Netherlands
- History of Dutch slavery
