= Mary Perth =

Mary Perth (c. 1740–1813+) was an African American colonist and businesswoman in Sierra Leone.

She was a Nova Scotian Settler. With her husband, Caesar Perth, she came to Nova Scotia in 1783. She subsequently emigrated from Nova Scotia to Freetown in 1792.

She was widowed in 1793. She was one of the six first (and one of three women) of the colonisers who was given a trading license in 1794. She managed an inn, selling retail goods in her shop, renting out rooms, and serving food in companionship with the Sierra Leone Company. She became a substantial and wealthy businessperson in Freetown. She had an important place in the Methodist congregation in Freetown.

In 1794, governor Zachary Macaulay appointed her housekeeper of the governor's residence and the caregiver of his 24 African foster children and their school. When Zachary Macaulay returned to England in 1799, she accompanied him to care for the children, at the African Academy, Clapham, London. She returned to Freetown in 1801, where she resumed her business activity.
