= Association of International Schools in Africa =

- Abbreviation: AISA
- Formation: 1969
- Type: Not For Profit
- Purpose: International School Membership Association
- Headquarters: International School of Kenya Campus, Off Peponi Road, Kitisuru, Nairobi
- Location: Kenya
- Members: 79 Schools; 81 Organizations
- Website: aisa.or.ke

The Association of International Schools in Africa (AISA) is a professional association of international schools in Africa. It was founded in 1969.

== Description ==
AISA's membership also includes Associate Members which are businesses, organizations and universities

The association currently serves 79 member schools located across Africa and 81 associate members.

== Governance ==
AISA is governed by a team of nine board members. The board members are school heads from AISA member schools who serve for a 2-year term.

The AISA team supporting the functions of the association consists of the following roles:

- Executive Director
- Deputy Executive Director
- Child Protection and Wellbeing Programme Manager
- Finance and Administration Manager
- Events Manager
- Administrative Officer
