= Year of Return, Ghana 2019 =

Initiative by the government of Ghana

The Year of Return, Ghana 2019 was an initiative of the government of Ghana – along with the U.S.-based Adinkra Group – that was intended to encourage African diasporans, especially from the US, to come to Africa, specifically Ghana, to settle and invest in the continent. It was formally launched by President Nana Akufo-Addo in September 2018 in Washington, D.C. as a program for Africans in the diaspora to unite with Africans. The year 2019 is symbolic as it commemorates 400 years since the first enslaved Africans landed in Hampton, in the English colony of Virginia in America.

The program also recognized the diaspora's achievements and sacrifices in the time since that event. Starting from when President Barack Obama made a visit to the Cape Coast in 2009, many famous, respected and admired African-Americans from the diaspora have visited Ghana to discover its culture. The Ghana Tourism Authority and the Ministry of Tourism, Arts and Culture lined up a slate of activities in "celebration of the resilience of the African spirit." Many African Americans shared their stories regarding their experiences in Ghana during the Year of Return.

== Objectives ==
- To make Ghana a key travel destination for African Americans and the rest of the African diaspora.
- To rebuild the lost past of these 400 years.
- To promote investment in Ghana and foster relationships with African Americans and the African diaspora.

== Visitors ==
Sheila Jackson Lee linked the initiative with the 400 Years of African-American History Commission Act that was passed in Congress in 2017. American actor and director Michael Jai White visited Ghana towards the end of 2018. Over 40 African diasporans participated in the "Full Circle Festival", which aimed to attract visitors to the country. The list includes but not limited to

- Idris Elba
- Boris Kodjoe
- Naomi Campbell
- Anthony Anderson
- Kofi Kingston
- Adrienne-Joi Johnson
- Steve Harvey
- Cardi B
- T.I.
- Ludacris
- Rick Ross
- Akon
- Rosario Dawson
- Diggy Simmons
- Jidenna
- Michael Jai White
- Nicole Ari Parker
- Conan O'Brien
- Koffee
- Sam Richardson

The Akwamuhene Odeneho Kwafo Akoto III, the Akwamu Paramount Chief, enstooled Michael Jai White as Nana Oduapong during his visit. Chief White's title means "The tree with strong roots that does not fear the storm".

== Revenue ==
Up to 1.5 million tourists, including celebrities, politicians and world leaders, are expected in Ghana by the end of the year, with up to 1.9 billion dollars expected to be accrued in revenue as a result of the Year of Return activities. The tourism sector has also recorded a tremendous growth of 18% in international arrivals from the Americas, Britain, Caribbean and other key countries. Airport arrivals increased by 45% for the year.

Its estimated spending of tourists has seen a significant increase from $1,862 in 2017 to the current figure of $2,589 per tourist, with the impact of tourism on the economy estimated to be about $1.9 billion.

== Impact ==
By 2024 local Ghanaians reported that the influx in returnee settlers has led to an economy centered on their interests that prices out locals. Akufo-Addo has been criticized for not properly preparing the long term economic effect of the Year of Return.

== Events ==
- Afrochella
- Afro Nation
- Back To Our Roots Tour
- Detty Rave
- Decemba to Rememba
- Crusade 4
- Bliss on the hills
- Live X Festival
- The Waakye summit
- Afrochic Diaspora Festival
- Potomanto Art Festival
- Accra Under the Stars
- The Black Gala
- Gold Coast Experience
- AkwaabaUK
- Black Is Black
- PineXGinja
- Meet The Moon Girls
- Polo Beach Club
- JD music festival - Djsky
- Panafest

== See also ==
- African Americans in Ghana
- Back-to-Africa movement
- Diaspora tourism
- Door of Return
- Genealogy tourism (Africa)
- Return to roots
- Right of return (Ghana)
- Detty December
