= AfroFuture =

African music festival

- Former logo (from 2022)
- Locations: El Wak Stadium, Accra, Ghana
- Years active: 2019–2022
- Organiser: Culture Management Group
- Website: afrochella.com

Afrofuture (stylized as AfroFuture), formerly known as Afrochella, is an African music festival that started in 2019.

== Background ==
AfroFuture is one of several cultural events that takes place in Ghana in December, including the Afro Nation festival and BHIM. The Black Star Line Festival is scheduled to launch in January 2023.

== History ==
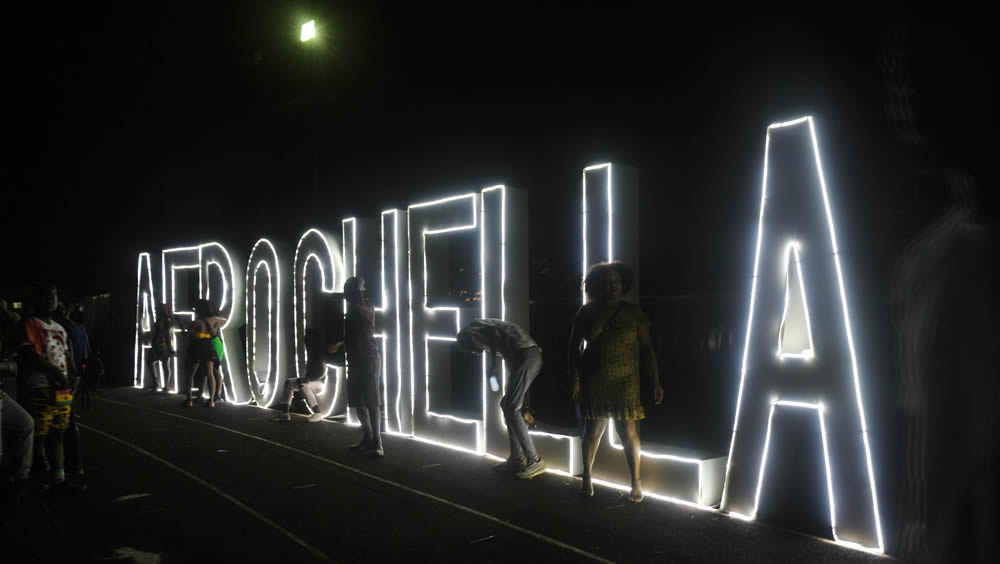
Afrochella 2019

AfroFuture was co-founded in 2019 as Afrochella by Abdul Abdullah. The festival is organised by Culture Management Group.

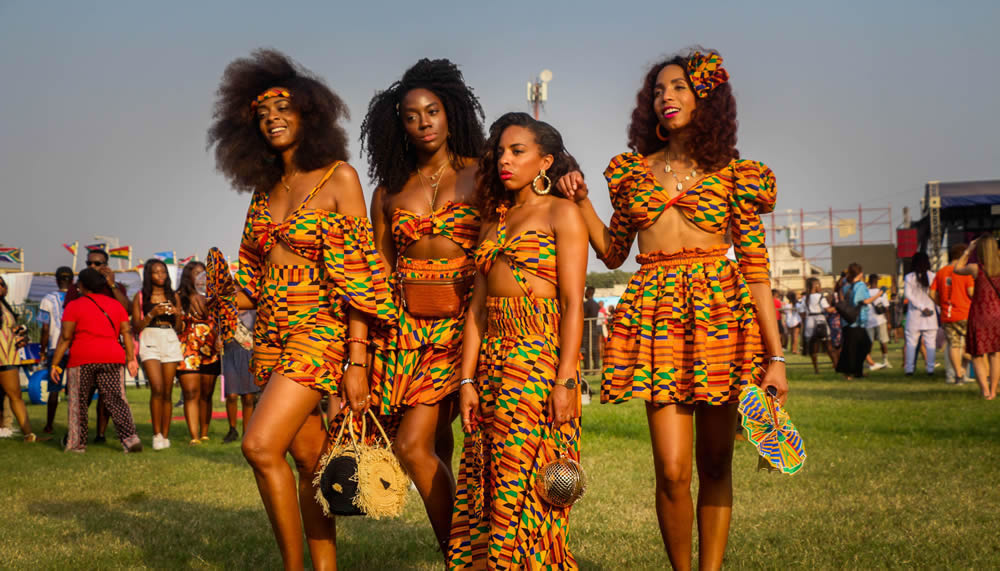
2019 attendees

Afrochella 2020 occurred from December 26 to January 1 in El Wak Stadium and featured Tiwa Savage, Joey-B and Juls, Sarkodie, Samini, Wande Coal, Distruction Boyz, Mercedes Benson, Neya Music, and Amarachi Nwosu. Afrochella 2021 featured Wizkid and Stonebwoy.

In October 2022, the organisers were sued by the organisers of Coachella festival for trademark infringement.

The last Afrochella took place in Accra's El-Wak stadium on December 28 and 29, 2022. The 2022 festival theme was Afrofuturism. Performers included Stonebwoy, Asake, Ayra Starr, Juls, Meek Mill, Rema, Black Sherif, Camidoh, Aerostar, and Gyakie with Burna Boy performing the headline act. Ayra Starr fell while performing and called upon the organisers to clean the stage between performances.
