= Door of Return =

Symbolic monument

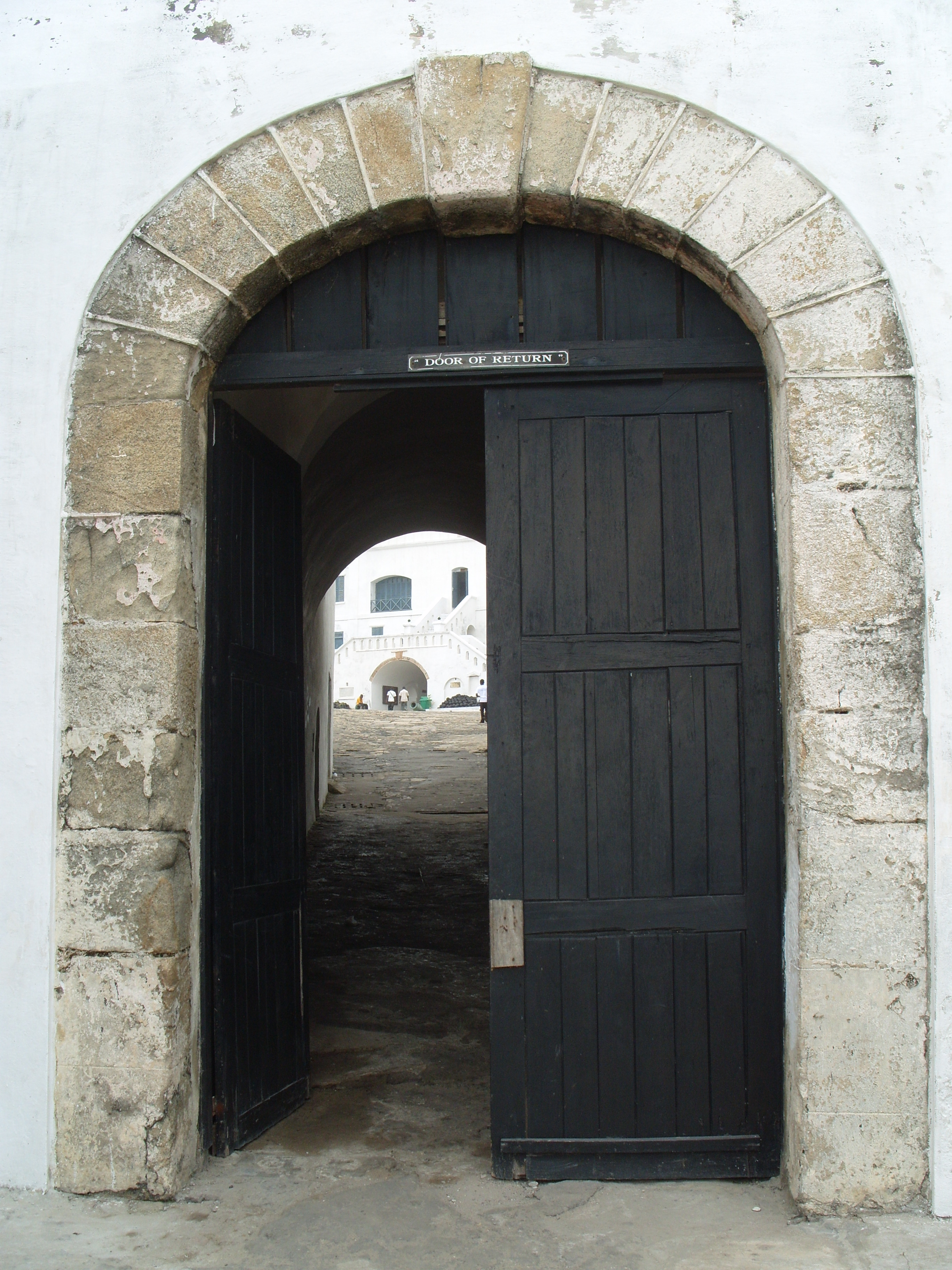
One of the now called “Doors of Return” (previously known as “Door of No Return”) at Cape Coast Castle, Ghana

The Door of Return is an emblem of African Renaissance and a pan-African initiative that seeks to launch a new era of cooperation between Africa and its diaspora in the 21st century. The name is a reference to the "Doors of No Return”, monuments in West African countries commemorating the transatlantic slave trade.

On 24 August 2017, Nigeria erected the first symbolic Door of Return monument as part of the Diaspora Festival in Badagry. The symbolic monument was unveiled under the auspices of the Hon. Abike Dabiri, Senior Special Assistant to the President on Diaspora and Foreign Affairs.

The Badagry Door of Return Experience is a cultural event commemorating theological homecoming of diasporic Africans who are descendants of African ancestors who were taken away as slaves to the Americas over the course of some 400 years during the trans-Atlantic enslavement of African peoples. The fourth edition of the commemorative event was held in October 2023.

The Door of Return initiative is expected to advance African economic development in areas of tourism, infrastructure and renewable energy. The erection of Door of Return Monuments are intended to promote inter-continental travel and act as a symbol of Africa’s openness to the Diaspora.

== See also ==
- African Americans in Africa
- Back-to-Africa movement
- Diaspora tourism
- Genealogy tourism (Africa)
- Return to roots
- Right of return (Ghana)
- Year of Return, Ghana 2019
