= Genealogy tourism =

Tourism based on ancestry

Genealogy tourism, sometimes called roots tourism or ancestral tourism, is a segment of the tourism market consisting of tourists who have ancestral connections to their holiday destination. These genealogy tourists travel to the land of their ancestors to reconnect with their family's past and "walk in the footsteps of their forefathers".

Genealogy tourism is a worldwide industry, although it is more prominent in countries that have experienced mass emigration at some time in history and thus have a large worldwide diaspora community.

Genealogy tourists often participate in tracing their ancestral lineages; digital access to historical records, as well as DNA studies in recent years, have allowed an increasing number of people to identify the homelands of their ancestors.

== Europe ==
Genealogy tourism has been prominent in Ireland; recorded genealogy tourism peaked in 2000 as 116,000 genealogical visitors travelled to the island. The Irish Tourist Board ceased recording genealogy visitor numbers in 2004, and its present levels are now unknown. Scottish diaspora and genealogical tourism have always been a large part of Scottish tourism. Scotland staged a homecoming festival in 2009 to appeal to genealogy tourists.

Genealogy tourism is very common in countries of Central Europe where World War II caused mass migrations of population. In particular, Jewish genealogy tourism is very popular and on the rise.

== Africa ==
Many African Americans and other diaspora Africans in the Americas were motivated to travel to their traditional African homelands following the release of Alex Haley's best-selling book Roots: The Saga of an American Family in 1976. Areas frequently visited include Cape Coast and Elmina in Ghana, Gorée in Senegal, Juffureh in Gambia, and Bahia in Brazil. African governments recognized this opportunity for development in tourism. Successive governments in Ghana, for example, have made efforts through the Ministry of Tourism to attract Diaspora Africans to Ghana, including the African African-American summit in 1999, the biannual Pan-African Historical Theatre Festival, Emancipation Day celebrations, and Juneteenth.

== Turkey ==
Armenian travel to eastern Turkey—the ancestral homeland of Armenians, often called the "old country" in Armenian (Ergir or Yergir)—is frequently described as roots tourism, pilgrimage, or homecoming rather than conventional leisure travel. Visitors seek ancestral villages, houses, cemeteries, churches, monasteries, and landscapes associated with families displaced during the Armenian genocide, connecting inherited memory with physical place. As one pilgrimage leader put it, "In a pilgrimage, you go to your own land. It is an appointment with your roots." Such connections are made through prayer, photographs, touching buildings, collecting soil or stones, and encounters with familiar foods and landscapes. Digital archives likewise help reconstruct lost family geographies and facilitate later visits.

These journeys also confront visitors with ruined, transformed, or repurposed Armenian heritage. Villages and houses may have disappeared, Armenian place-names have often been replaced, and surviving churches and monasteries can become the principal remaining markers of former Armenian settlement. Restoration and "faith tourism" can preserve buildings while presenting them chiefly as tourist attractions and reducing or obscuring their Armenian religious identity. However, sociologist Defne Över has reported that Armenian visitors who attempted to pray outside the authorized service at Akhtamar were reminded by a guard that they were "only tourists."

Access to Western Armenia has also been shaped by legal, geographical, and security barriers. During the Soviet era ordinary Armenia–Turkey travel was severely restricted; Turkey blockaded Eastern Armenia by closing land borders in 1993, and Armenian citizens later faced additional visa requirements, although direct air travel resumed in the 2000s. Diaspora Armenians using other passports can generally travel legally, but remote terrain, changed place-names, vanished settlements, difficult roads, and periods of armed conflict make organized tours particularly important. Anti-Armenian sentiment in Turkey also affects how openly visitors express Armenian identity; on some tours, pilgrims have been advised not to speak Armenian. The resulting journeys constitute a form of return in which ancestral places become physically accessible while remaining politically, materially, and socially transformed.

== See also ==
- Birthright Armenia
- Door of Return
- Year of Return, Ghana 2019
