= Custine =

Custine may refer to:

- Adam Philippe, Comte de Custine (1740–1793), French general
- Delphine de Custine (1770–1826), French society hostess and woman of letters
- Astolphe-Louis-Léonor, Marquis de Custine (1790–1857), French aristocrat and writer, Delphine's son

== See also ==
- Custines, a commune in France
