= Anna Colas Pépin =

Euro-African businesswoman (1797–1872)

- Born: 1787
- Died: 1872 (aged 84–85)
- Occupations: Businesswoman; Trader
- Known for: Leading Senegalese of Goree

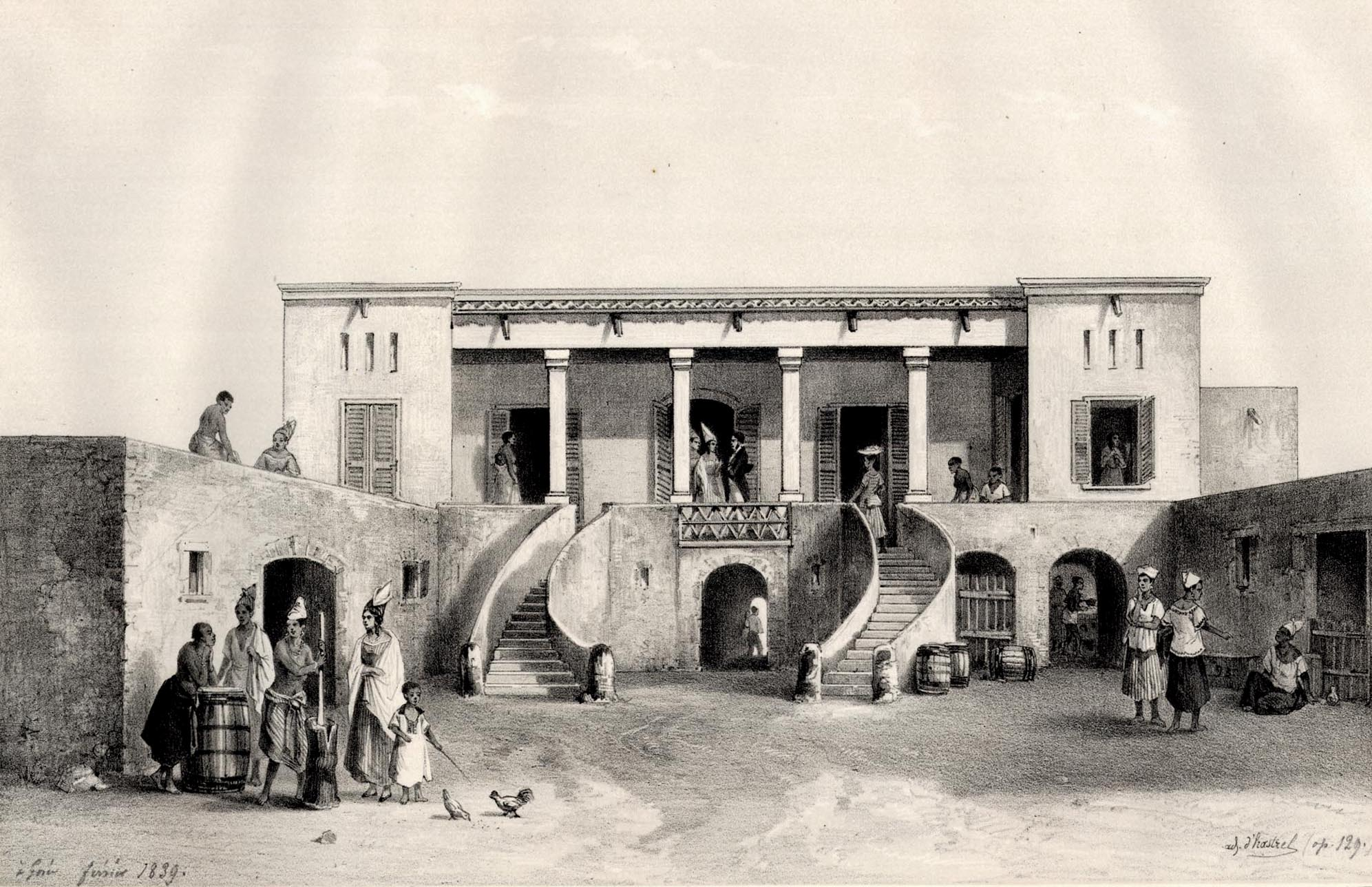
Home of Anna Colas Pépin, 1839. The unidentified fair-skinned woman may have been Anna Colas Pépin.

Anna Colas Pépin or Anne-Nicolas "Annacolas" Pépin (1787–1872), was a Euro-African signare businesswoman. She belongs to the most famous examples of the signares of Gorée, but has often been confused with her paternal aunt Anne Pépin.

She was the daughter of Nicolas Pépin (1744–1815) and Marie-Thérèse Picard (d. 1790), married François de Saint-Jean and became the mother of Mary de Saint Jean (1815–1853), wife of the first Senegalese member of the French Parliament, Barthélémy Durand Valantin (1806–1864): the famous painting made by Édouard Auguste Nousveaux could depict either Anna Colas Pépin or her daughter.

Pépin was described as a leading and influential member of the Signare community, and invested in land and buildings on Gorée in cooperation with the French authorities. As a leading member of the local elite, she famously received François d'Orléans, Prince of Joinville on his visit to Gorée in 1842, a scene depicted by Édouard Auguste Nousveaux.
