= Delphine de Custine =

French literary and social figure (1770–1826)

Delphine de Sabran
- Marquise de Custine
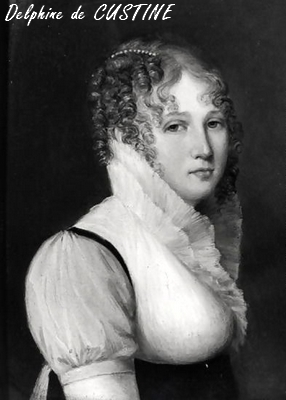
- Born: 18 March 1770; Paris, France
- Died: 13 July 1826 (aged 56); Bex, Vaud, Switzerland
- Noble family: Sabran
- Spouses: Armand Renaud-Louis-Philippe-Francois, Marquis de Custine (wid. 1793)
- Issue: Astolphe-Louis-Léonor, Marquis de Custine
- Father: Joseph de Sabran
- Mother: Françoise Eléonore Dejean de Manville

Delphine de Sabran, Marquise de Custine (18 March 1770 – 13 July 1826) was a French society hostess and woman of letters. Known for her beauty and intelligence, Madame de Abrantès referred to de Custine as "one of those lovely creatures that God gives to the world in a moment of munificence". During the French Revolution she was imprisoned at Carmes Prison. She was freed after the fall of Maximilien Robespierre but was left widowed. After the revolution she focused on the education of her son, Astolphe-Louis-Léonor, Marquis de Custine, taking him to Italy and Switzerland. A freethinker, she was a prominent literary and social figure during the Napoleonic era.

== Biography ==
Delphine de Sabran was born in Paris on 18 March 1770 into the House of Sabran, a French noble family. She was the daughter of Joseph de Sabran, Comte de Sabran and Françoise Eléonore Dejean de Manville. She was a descendant of Margaret of Provence, the wife of Saint Louis. Her father died in 1775 and her mother later remarried to Stanislas de Boufflers. She married Armand Renaud-Louis-Philippe-Francois de Custine, the son of Adam Philippe, Comte de Custine. They had a son, Astolphe-Louis-Léonor, Marquis de Custine.

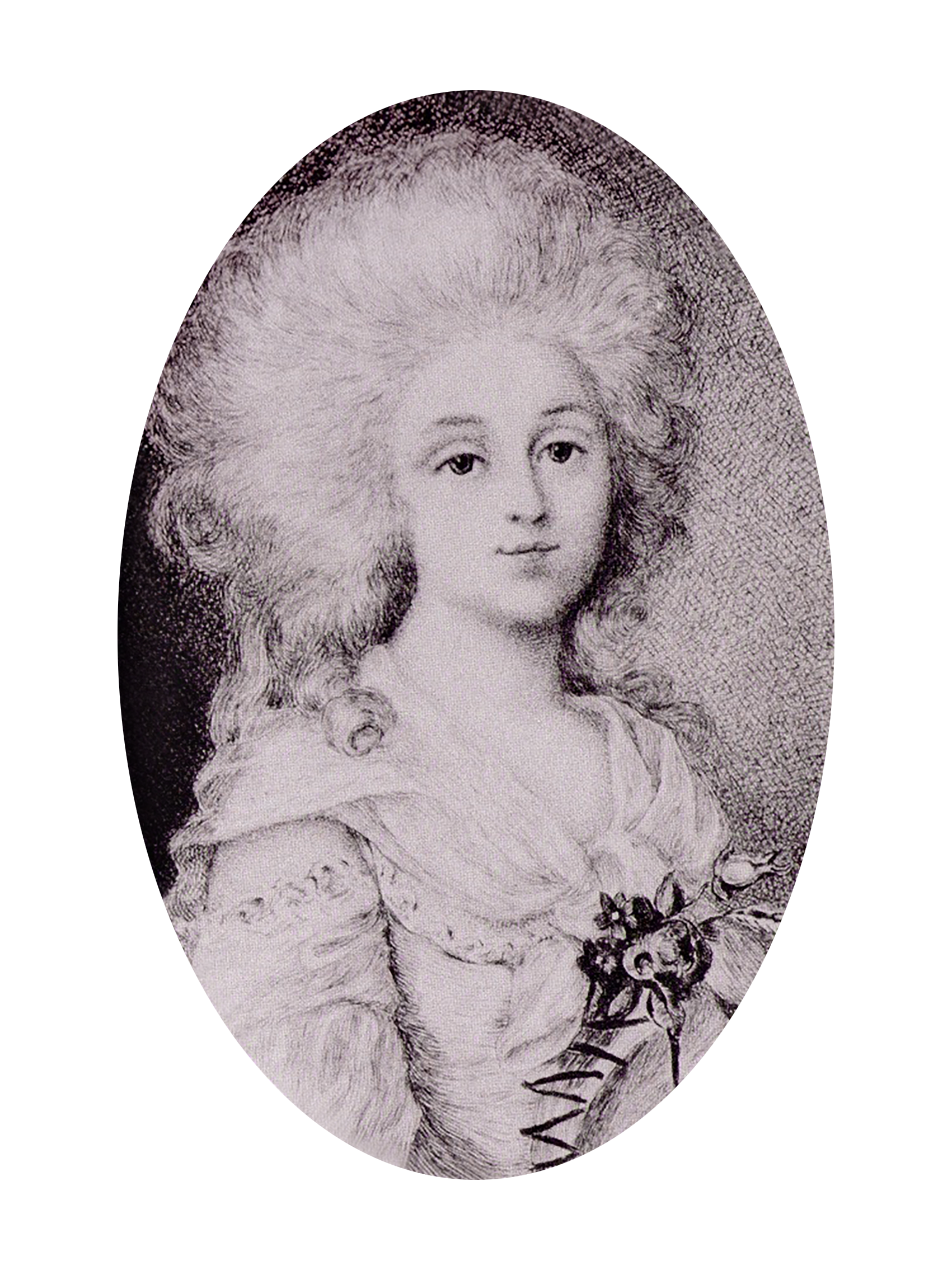
Madame de Custine

During the French Revolution de Custine defended her father-in-law before the Revolutionary Tribunal. She was imprisoned at Carmes Prison along with her husband and father-in-law but was later released after the fall of Maximilien Robespierre. After her release she was able to restore some of the family property which had been seized. Her husband and father-in-law were both guillotined during the Reign of Terror. She had various lovers including François Antoine de Boissy d'Anglas, Francisco de Miranda, and Joseph Fouché.

At the advice of François-René de Chateaubriand, de Custine bought the Château de Fervaques in 1803. She took up painting, and was recognized for her work by Elisabeth Vigée-Lebrun. She hosted literary and artistic salons at Fervaques Her salons included de Chateaubriand, Henri-Philippe Gérard, and Charles-Julien Lioult de Chênedollé. de Chateaubriand wrote about her in his memoir Mémoires d'Outre-Tombe.

Her memoir was published in 1912.

== In literature ==
Germaine de Staël based the title figure of her novel Delphine (1802) on de Custine. F. L. Lucas's poem 'A Tale of Two Centuries' in his From Many Times and Lands (1953) is about Eléonor de Sabron and her daughter Delphine de Custine.
