= Signare =

Historical demographic

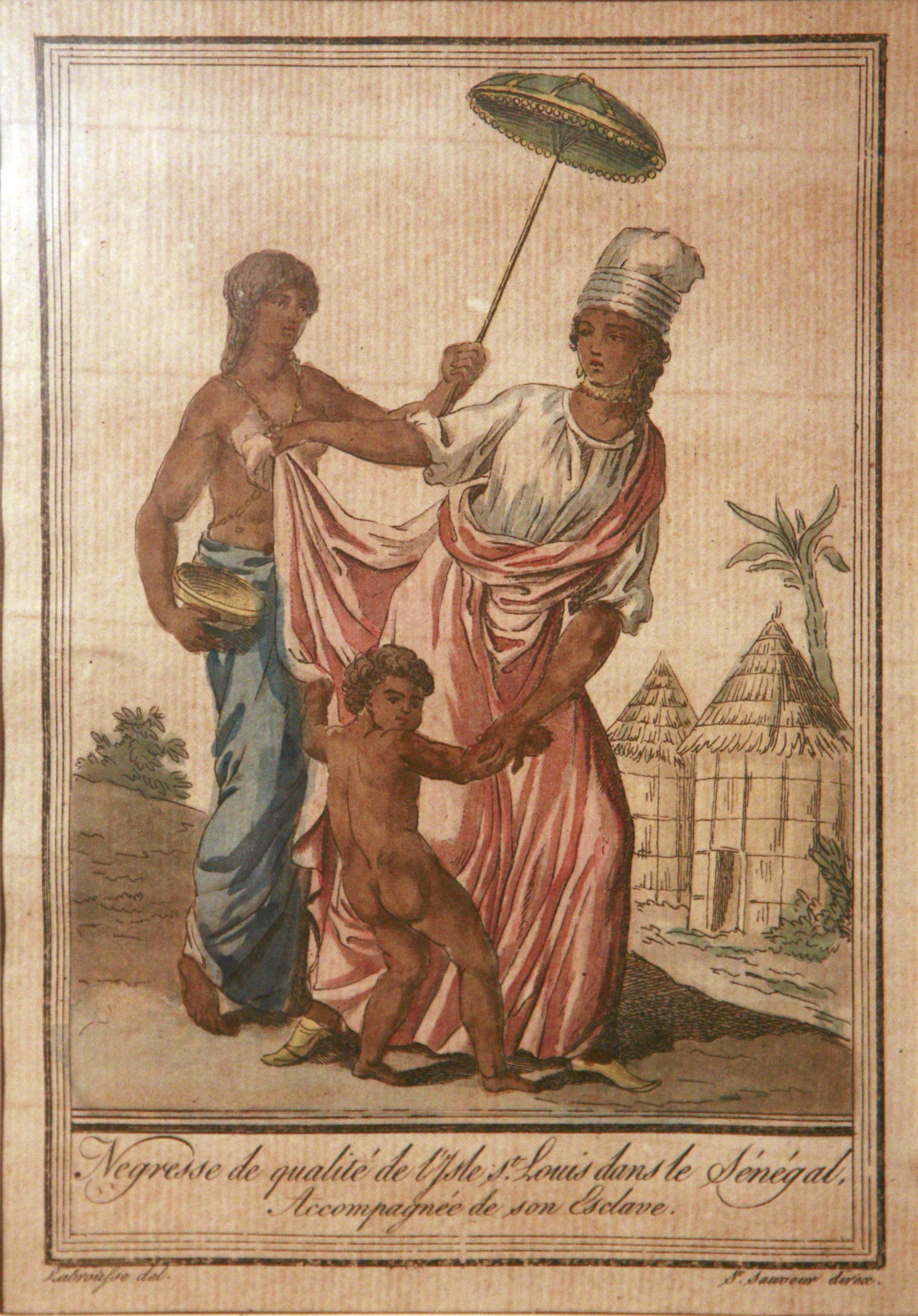
Negresse of quality from the Island of Saint Louis in Senegal, accompanied by her slave, Illustration from Costumes civils de tous les peuples connus, Paris, 1788, by Jacques Grasset de Saint-Sauveur.

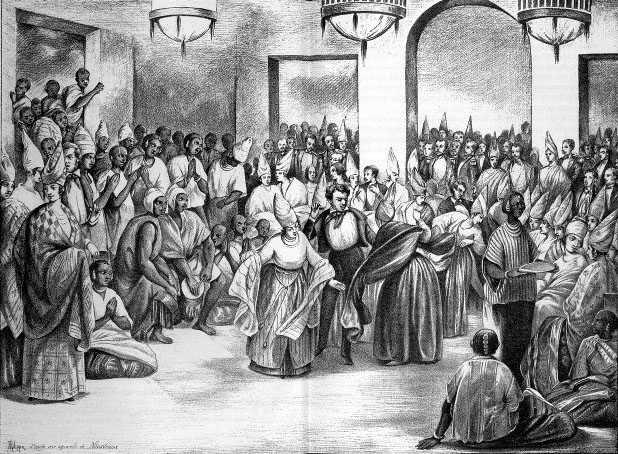
A Signares ball, with European men.

Signares were black and mulatto Senegalese women who had an influence via their marriage with European men and their patrimony. These women of color managed to gain some individual assets, status, and power in the hierarchies of the Atlantic slave trade.

There was a Portuguese equivalent, referred to as Nhara, a name for Luso-African businesswomen who played an important part as business agents through their connections with both Portuguese and African populations. There was also an English language equivalent of women of mixed African and British or American descent with the same position, such as Betsy Heard, Mary Faber de Sanger, and Elizabeth Frazer Skelton.

== Social and economic role ==
Signares commonly had power in networks of trade and wealth within the limitations of slavery. The influence held by these women led to changes in gender roles in the family structure archetype. Some owned masses of land as well as slaves. With these owned masses of land, Signares were able to establish small business like inns and taverns. With these small businesses, Signares were able to gain profit from the constant rotation of people coming in. European merchants and traders, especially the French and the British, would settle on coastal societies inhabited by signares in order to benefit from the increased proximity to the sources of African commerce. The earliest of these merchants were the Portuguese and were given the name "lançados" because "they threw themselves" among Africans and would establish relationships with the most influential signares who would accept them in order to obtain commercial privileges. The Portuguese referred to these women as Nhara, and the earliest named example was Dame Portugaise in the 17th-century.

The signares reputation for wealth became well-known, exemplified in an account from Preneau de Pommegorge, a French explorer who had been living in West Africa for 22 years until 1765. He wrote in his account that "the women on the island (Saint-Louis) are, in general, closely associated with white men, and care for them when they are sick in a manner that could not be bettered. The majority live in considerable affluence, and many African women own thirty to forty slaves which they hire to the company."

Many signares were wed under “common local law” that was recognized by priests of the Catholic faith. These marriages were for economic and social reasons. Both signares and their husbands gained from these partnerships. Europeans passed their names down to the offspring and with it their lineage.

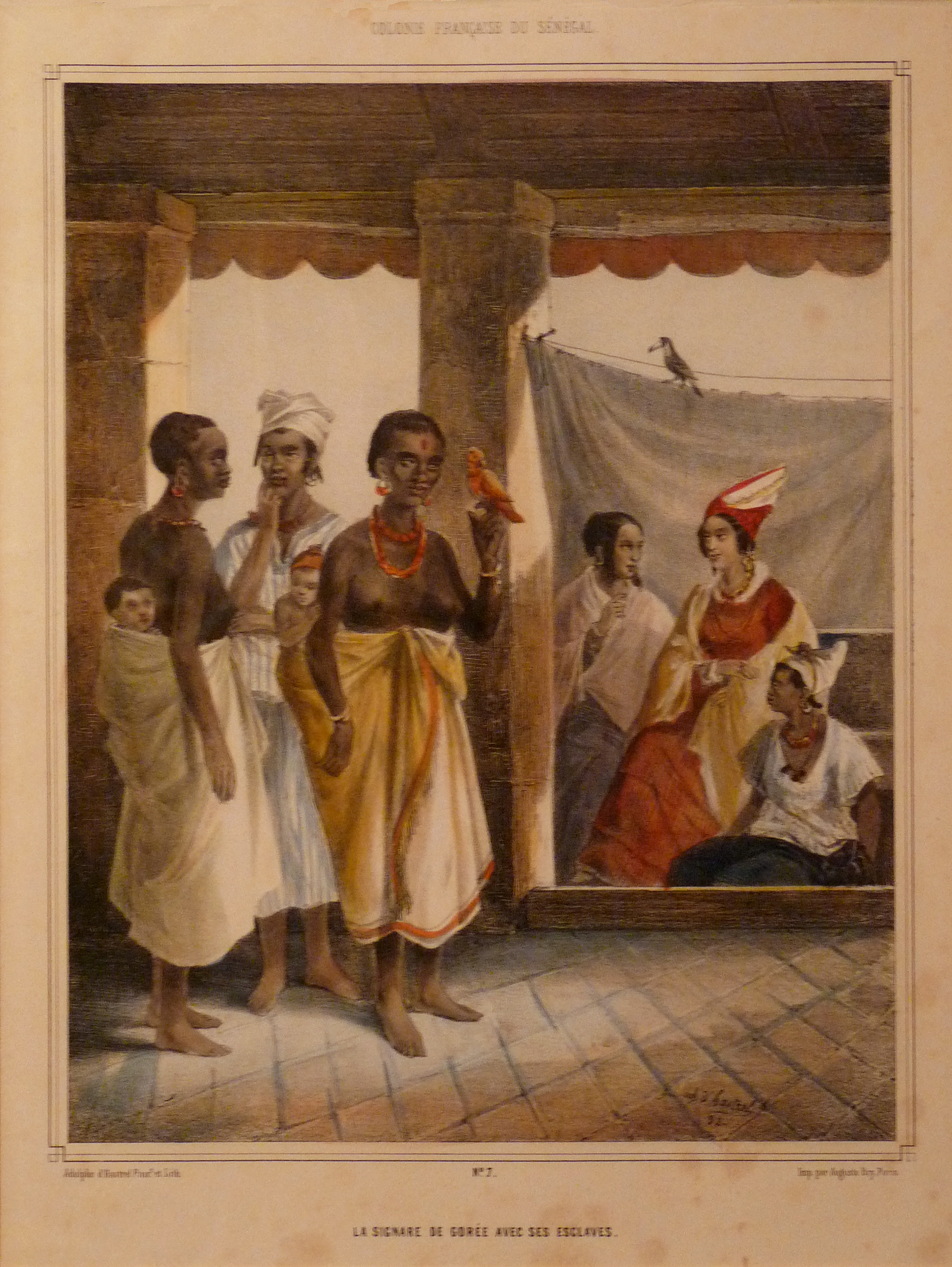
A signare on Gorée along with her slaves.

When some of the signares became too powerful, leaders like the Portuguese Crown sought ways to remove the women from their wealth. Different crimes that the Portuguese Crown sought to accuse the women of were crimes against the state or crimes against Christianity. An example appears with Bibiana Vaz de França. She was a prominent signare who over the years accumulated a lot of wealth and slaves. After realizing how powerful she was, the Crown wanted to find a way to dismantle her influence and power. “Accused of rebellion, trading with foreigners, and tax evasion, she was imprisoned with her younger brother and another co-conspirator and taken to Cape Verde Islands”.

She was able to receive a royal pardon and free her younger brother after leading a coup against the Crown's representatives. Her power made the Crown seek to criminalize Bibiana Vuz de França. However, once they realized that she was too powerful and too influential, all charges against her were dropped and she was once more considered loyal to the crown. Bibiana Vuz de França's confrontation with the Portuguese Crown represents the strength of the signares in the time period and Portugal's growing inability to control the people.

=== Social mobility ===
The social status of signares also allowed for greater social mobility in Gorée than in other parts of Africa. Though there is limited documentation on the origins of most of the signares, it seems likely that at this time the people of Gorée were divided into several social classes: the jambor or freeborn; the jam or people of slave descent; the tega and uga or blacksmiths and leatherworkers and griots or storytellers.

Many signares were of the jam or griot class, and were often married by European men because they were considered especially beautiful. The signares' beauty was deemed by some to be superior to European women. Reverend John Lindsay was a chaplain on one of the British vessels that captured Gorée in 1758 and a subsequent visitor to Saint Louis. In a written account, he said that the Wolof women "far surpass the Europeans in every respect", and he compared their "loose, light, easy robe" to the what the "female Grecian statues attired".

Once married to European men, women helped them handle many of their trading affairs and transactions, and gained economic and social stature in the community themselves. In this way, women of lower social status could gain power in the community and become important traders through their marital status.

Nevertheless, there was some opposition to the privileges that the signares enjoyed. For example, the French botanist Michel Anderson said that the treatment of the African women was unfair as often they were in better positions than lower-class French men. However, he argued that this unfair special treatment of the signares was only natural because there were no female European settlers for the European men to marry, and men in hot climates find it harder to resist a woman's charms, especially the signares, who he said were “a sex as dangerous as it is attractive".

=== Marital practices ===
Marriages between African women and European men were governed by local law. Since many European men would not stay in Gorée permanently, marriages were often in a state of flux. If a European man left Gorée and intended to return, the African woman would wait for him. When the man got on the boat to go back to Europe, signares would scoop up the sand where his last footprints were and put it in a handkerchief, which they would hang on her bedpost until he returned. Signares would often wait years without remarrying for men to return.

If European men left without planning to return, or if a signare learned that her European husband was not going to return to Gorée, women would remarry. That was not considered shameful in any way, and signares would not lose any of their social status, and would often retain much of the trading power that they gained through their prior marital status. Remarried signares would often raise their children from their European husbands alongside their new African husbands, and those children would receive inheritance from their mothers, not their fathers.

== List of notable signares ==
- Victoria Albis
- Caty Louette
- Anna Colas Pépin
- Anne Pépin
- Dame Portugaise
- Crispina Peres
- Anne Rossignol
- Ana Joaquina dos Santos e Silva
- Marie Baude
- Hope (Esperança) Booker

== See also ==
- Cassare
- Gens de couleur
- Affranchi
- Plaçage
- French people in Senegal
- Morganatic marriage
- Concubinage
- Hypergamy
- Marriage à la façon du pays
- Atlantic Creole
- Gold Coast Euro-Africans

== Sources ==
- George E. Brooks, Eurafricans in Western Africa: Commerce, Social Status, Gender, and Religious Observance from the Sixteenth to the Eighteenth Century (Ohio University Press, 2003).
- Guillaume Vial, Femmes d'influence. Les signares de Saint-Louis du Sénégal et de Gorée XVIIIe-XIXe siècle. Étude critique d'une identité métisse, Paris: Nouvelles Éditions Maisonneuve & Larose - Hémisphères Éditions, 2019, 381 p.
