= Dame Portugaise =

Dame Portugaise (d. after 1634), was a Luso-African Nhara slave trader. She was likely daughter of a Portuguese man and African woman and established as a slave trader and merchant in Rufisque, where she acted as a contact channel between the Portuguese and the African rulers of the region through her connections with both, in effect controlling the entire business between the Africans and the Europeans in the region. She is the earliest example of the many Euro-African businesswomen who acted as business-agents and diplomats between the Europeans and the African from this point on until the end of the 19th-century.
