= Marie Baude =

Marie Baude (c. 1703- fl. 1728) was a Senegambian signare businesswoman and slave trader. She was married to the convicted French murderer, Jean Pinet. Despite a lack of significant evidence regarding her life, Baude's narrative embodies the intricate dynamics of the transatlantic slave trade era, from her ascent as a signare, wielding influence amid the trade, to the events surrounding her husband's trial and deportation.

== Early life ==
Marie Baude was born in about 1703 (1701 according to her testimony) in Joal, a city on the western coast of Senegal. Her mother is unknown and her father was a Frenchman known as ‘Sieur Baude’. Documents from the time of her life referred to her as a ‘mulâtresse’. She married Jean Pinet in 1721, in a marriage arranged by her father. They moved to a French comptoirs, on Gorée, an island off the coast. Pinet was the only gunsmith on the island leading to wealth quickly. Together, they owned slaves and lived a comfortable lifestyle. Baude was a signare working with the French in the slave trade.

=== The Trans-Atlantic Slave Trade ===
Baude grew up during the height of the transatlantic slave trade, which was a triangular trade system between Europe, the west coast of Africa, and the Americas. The middle passage was the exchange of European goods for African people. The European powers set up trading posts, called comptoirs, on the western coast of Africa and traded gold, textiles, and weapons with the African kingdoms for slaves. Statistical projections determined that almost 13 million people were taken and sold into slavery between 1501 and 1866. More than 2 million people died during the journey. In the 1730s, the British brought more than three thousand people per year from Africa to North America.

=== Signares ===
Baude was considered a signare. Signares were women who were married to European men, giving them a level of status above those who were enslaved. African women were uniquely oppressed by the transatlantic slave trade—however, some used whiteness and class privilege to hold the position of signares. This status level didn’t change the fact that they were still under the order of their husbands. Signares became a class between the enslavers and the enslaved. Their cultural flexibility allowed them to move between European and African authorities with influence.

== Jean Pinet's murder and trial ==
In June of 1724, some French company workers and sailors drank at the Pinet’s house in Saint-Louis throughout the night. According to testimony, It started lighthearted and fun with games being played. Tempers eventually flared and the conversation grew heated, as LeGrain made a sexually threatening remark directed at Jean Pinet that he would rape Marie and his sister-in-law. This led to LeGrain and Pinet fighting. Pinet eventually gained the upper hand and began kicking LeGrain before using a sword lying in the forge and killing LeGrain. According to statements from the case, Pinet left him for dead in the doorway while he left to continue the party elsewhere.

Jean Pinet, Baude’s husband, went on trial for the murder of Pierre LeGrain a day later. She stood before a court clerk, the former and current Company of Indies directors, and the governor of Fort Saint-Louis du Sénégal. Baude stated she had gone to bed before the events occurred and slept through the murder. She offered no clear information about when the events took place and the nature of the violence that had occurred. She claimed not to know that her husband had killed anyone or anything about any injuries he incurred. She had heard the insult but said the comments were not a matter of consequence. She continually asserted these claims throughout the interrogation. She protected her husband by not incriminating him in the case.

Despite this protection, Jean Pinet was convicted of the murder and was deported by Company of the Indies back to Nantes, France where he was imprisoned.

=== Pinet's deportation to Louisiana ===
In 1726, Pinet was deported again by the Company of the Indies. This time, he was sent from Nantes to Louisiana (then a French colony) to work as a gunsmith. Two years later, Baude would follow. She boarded the ship La Galathée in 1728 as a free woman followed by three of her own slaves. Upon her arrival, Baude had her accompanying slaves confiscated by officials of the Company of the Indies in New Orleans. The reason given was that she had not paid the import duties. She may have been an African woman with property, social connections, and prestige in Senegambia, but she lost her name and her slaves when she moved to Louisiana. In records, she is simply identified as la femme Pinet, or the wife of Pinet.

== Life in New Orleans ==
While there is little to no record of Baude’s life once she reached New Orleans, putting her life into historical context gives a view into what it could’ve been like. Despite not being enslaved herself, over half of the slaves who were brought to Louisiana by the French originated from Senegambia. Senegambia has been described as a 'homogenous culture and a common style of history.' Displacement from one's home and identity without any way of getting it back was just as if not more devastating in the long run. In 1732, slaves accounted for about 29% of the population in New Orleans. At this point, local governments had presented the colony as primarily a slave society.

=== Code Noir ===
Baude, as well as hundreds of thousands of African women living along the Gulf Coast in the early 18th century had lives defined by a lack of resources, isolation, and the shared urge to survive in a hostile environment. This was further perpetuated by a decree from 1685 by King Louis XIV known as Code Noir. This defined the conditions of slavery in French colonies. Among these laws, a fine of 300 livres was imposed on the owner of an enslaved woman who gave birth to a child of mixed race, as well as on the father if he was not the owner. The woman and her child were taken to the hospital to give birth, and they were never freed. Another law was a tax imposed on free people of color who hid runaway slaves. In Louisiana, those who harbored fugitive slaves and who were not able to pay the said tax were sold for the colony’s profit and were re-enslaved.

=== 'Mulatto' ===
Marie Baude is referred to as a ‘mulâtresse’ in colonial records. The term, more commonly ‘mulatto’ (derogatory), is used to describe someone who was born to mixed-race parents. More specifically, it was a term used to dehumanize the offspring of slaves and their owners. ‘Mulatto’ women would balance the line between being submissively enslaved and having a sense of influence. ‘Mulatto’ women who worked in their husbands’ homes had very private roles. However, the use of the word, ‘mulatto’, widened the degree of separation between white colonists and non-white slaves.

== Death and legacy ==
There isn’t much record of Baude's time in New Orleans or her life onward from the 1730s. According to Jessica Marie Johnson, the last time she appeared in any archival record was in the 1731 census. This census shows that she was living with her husband, five enslaved African-descended people, and one white servant in New Orleans. Thanks to Johnson's extensive research and book, "Wicked Flesh: Black Women, Intimacy, and Freedom in the Atlantic World.", Marie Baude has been brought to scholars' attention and further research is being done in order to piece together her life.
