= Cassare =

Type of marriage alliance

Cassare or calissare (from Portuguese casar, "to marry") was the term applied to the marriage alliances, largely in West Africa, set up between European and African slave traders; the "husband" was European and the wife/concubine African. This was not marriage under Christian auspices, although there might be an African ceremony; there were few clerics in equatorial Africa, and the "wives" could not marry since they had not been baptized. Male monogamy was not expected. As such, concubinage is a more accurate term. The multinational Quaker slave trader and polygamist, Zephaniah Kingsley purchased the Wolof princess, Anna Kingsley, who had earlier been enslaved and sold in Cuba, after being captured in modern-day Senegal.

Cassare created political and economic bonds. The name is European, and reflects similar relationships of Portuguese men, who were the first explorers of the west African coast. But it antedated European contact; selling a daughter, if not for cash, then for some economic benefit, including simple peace, was a pre-European practice used to integrate the "other" from a differing African ethnic group. Powerful West African groups with ties to the slave trade used these marriages to strengthen their alliances with European men by marrying off (selling) their daughters. Early on in the Atlantic slave trade, these marriages were common. The marriages were sometimes performed using African customs, which Europeans did not object to, seeing how important the connections were. African wives could receive money and schooling for the children they bore to European men. Wives could also inherit slaves and property from their husbands when they returned to Europe or died.

Depending on the region of West Africa, European men might cassare either free or enslaved women. Historian George Brooks explained “that there was a difference between how “stratified and patrilineal” societies north of the Gambia River and the “acephalous and matrilineal” societies south of the Gambia approached marriages to European traders. While the former groups mostly married daughters of enslaved women to the traders, the latter also married daughters of free women to European traders.”

Many coastal ethnic groups in West Africa, such as the Ga and Fante, used this system to gain political and economic advantages. It enabled Africans to trust strangers, like the Europeans, when dealing within their trade networks. It made the transition from strangers to trading partners a lot smoother.

== Effects of Cassare Marriages on the Colonial Trade ==
“During the slave trade, these cassare marriages were central in establishing the cross-cultural connections that made trade possible.” The marriages functioned as an integral economic tool to integrate European men into the culture. West Africans embraced the arrangements as they provided some assurance that the children that resulted from these relationships would belong to the African families. As these slave-trading posts in West Africa were not colonial societies, where interracial marriages were directly subversive to power hierarchies, cassare marriages offered some stability in the trade relationships in West Africa for three centuries.

This practice was particularly useful in ensuring that the children of European men would benefit economically when their fathers left or died, as it allowed mixed-race children to inherit. This was critically important in the establishment and continuation of trade between Europe and West Africa. Children of Cassare marriages were not embracing European culture over African culture, the hybridization of their culture is what made their position powerful. This power dynamic is most clear in the establishment of the class of signare. These women were able to wield their influence to increase their economic standing and improve trade relations.

By the nineteenth century, these marriages lost their practical purpose as interracial marriage was more directly monitored, and opposition to these marriages increased throughout the Atlantic world.

== See also ==
- Dutch Slave Coast
- Gold Coast Euro-Africans
- Mulatto
- Signare

== Sources ==
- Ipsen, Pernille. Daughters of the Trade : Atlantic Slavers and Interracial Marriage on the Gold Coast. Philadelphia: University of Pennsylvania Press, 2015.
- Brooks, George E. Eurafricans in Western Africa : Commerce, Social Status, Gender, and Religious Observance from the Sixteenth to the Eighteenth Century. Athens: Ohio University Press, 2003.
