= Betsy Heard =

Euro-African slave trader and merchant

Betsy Heard (c. 1759 – after 1812) was a Euro-African slave trader and merchant.

Her father was an entrepreneur who had travelled from Liverpool, England, to the Los Islands, off the coast of what is now Guinea, in the mid-1700s. Her mother was African. Her father probably followed local custom, which dictated that a stranger would have to establish his position in society by marrying his landlord's slave or a daughter of a slave woman.

Heard's father sent her to England, most likely near Liverpool (where there were usually 50-70 Africans and mixed-race offspring of traders receiving an English education). Upon completing her studies, she returned to West Africa and set up a trading post on the Bereira River, following her father's trade. Eventually, she inherited her father's slave-trading factory and connections. By 1794, she had established a monopoly on the slave trade in the area and owned the main wharf in Bereira, several trading ships, and a warehouse. This success was in part due to the Islamic jihad in Futa Jallon; the vanquished were enslaved. Bereira itself was seized by the Muslims, but this had no detrimental effect on her business. She became recognised as the unofficial queen of the river up to the end of the century.

Her wealth and political influence also earned her a reputation for diplomacy; she mediated a longstanding dispute that had endured from 1800 to 1807 between several local chiefs and the Sierra Leone Company and averted a war. She appears to have retired from the slave trade after this.

According to a visitor, she furnished her house in the European style. In 1807, she had another house built.

She was apparently a relative of Augustine Heard of Heard & Company, which dealt in the California opium trade.

== See also ==
- Signares, female slave traders in colonial West Africa
