= Françoise Eléonore Dejean de Manville =

French socialite and letter writer (1749–1827)

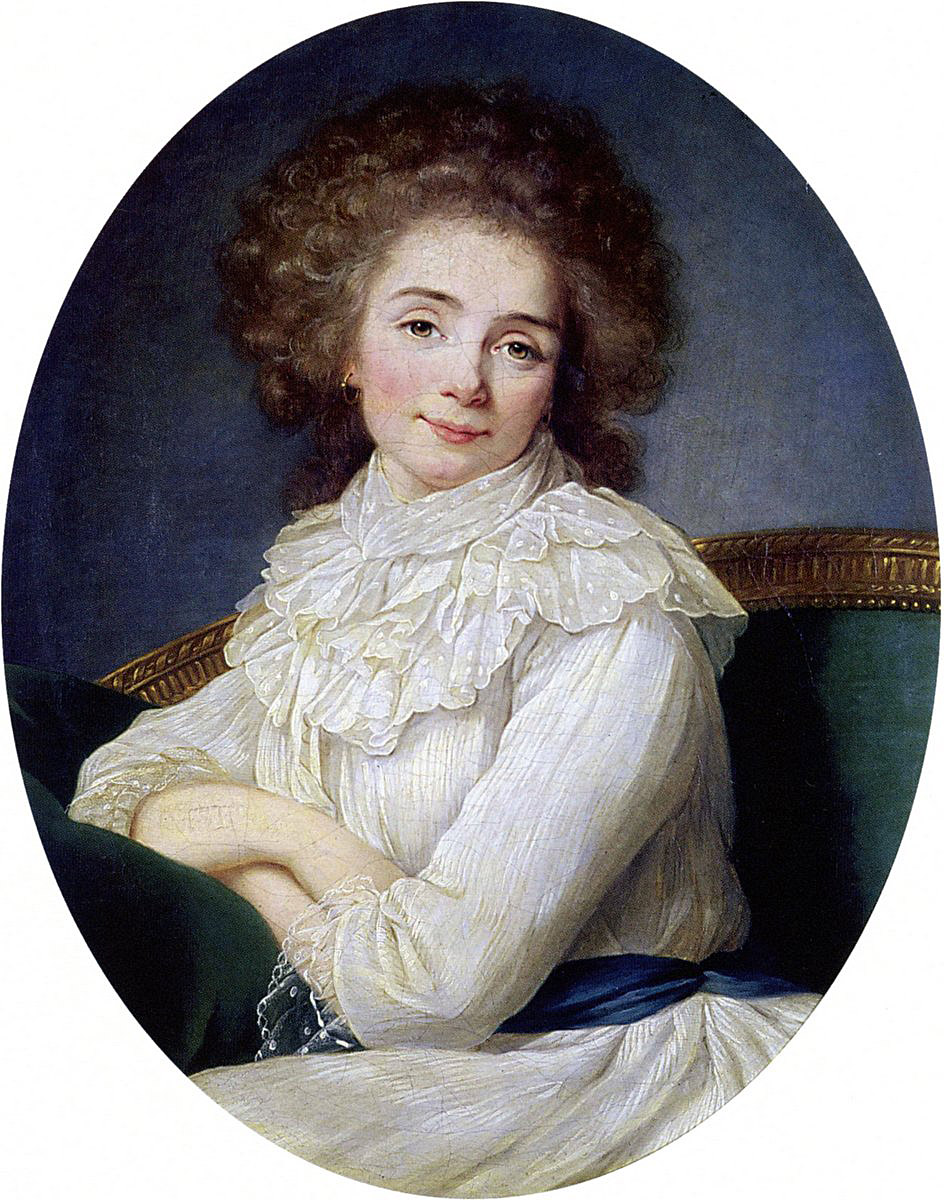
- The Comtesse de Sabran (before 1787) by Élisabeth Vigée Le Brun
- Born: 3 March 1749; Paris, France
- Died: 27 February 1827 (aged 77); Paris, France
- Occupation: Letter writer

Françoise Eléonore Dejean de Manville (3 March 1749 – 27 February 1827), Countess of Sabran and then Marquise of Boufflers, was a French socialite and letter writer whose life extended from the Ancien Régime through the French Revolution and First French Empire to the Bourbon Restoration. She is known for the letters she exchanged with Stanislas de Boufflers, whom she eventually married.

== Life ==
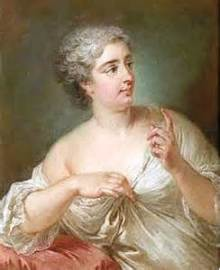
Françoise Éléonore de Boufflers

Françoise Eléonore Dejean de Manville was born in Paris on 3 March 1749. Her father was Charles Dejean, seigneur de Manville. In 1768 Françoise married Joseph de Sabran, comte de Grammont (1702–1775). She was 19 and he was 66. They had two children, Delphine de Sabran, later Countess of Custine (1770–1826) and Louis-Elzéar de Sabran, who joined the Garde du Corps of Louis XVI (1774–1846). Françoise was widowed in 1775 at the age of 26.

In 1777 the Prince de Ligne introduced Françoise to the Chevalier Stanislas de Boufflers (1738–1815). Boufflers was a brilliant and seductive literary man, and a member of the Knights of Malta. Their relationship began as a playful friendship. They became lovers in May 1781, and were not secretive about their union. He could not leave the Knights of Malta without forfeiting his ecclesiastical benefits, and chose to continue a rather mediocre military career with the Knights. Françoise maintained a correspondence with Boufflers during his stay in Senegal, which gives abundant information about life in 18th century Senegal and the way the colony was organized.

In 1797 Françoise finally married Boufflers, in Breslau. Due to the French Revolution, when they finally married they had both lost their fortunes. They settled in the country near Paris. Boufflers died in 1815. Françoise died in Paris on 27 February 1827 at the age of 77. Her body is in the 11th division of the Père Lachaise Cemetery in the Delille enclosure, beside her husband's, where it was moved in 1846.

== Publications ==
The correspondence between Françoise and Boufflers was first published in 1875, edited by Henri Prat and Ernest de Magnieu. A completely fresh version was published in two volumes in 2009/2010, edited by Sue Carrell, with very extensive notes that attempt to bring the relationship to life. A number of letters omitted from the first edition were included, and many corrections made to the transcriptions. Their letters show the gradual maturing of their relationship. Those by Bouffier are sometimes rather too literary, while those of Madame de Sabran seem more spontaneous, and display her remarkable ironic intelligence.

- Boufflers, Françoise Éléonore de; Boufflers, Stanislas-Jean de (1875), Prat, Henri; Magnieu, E de. (eds.), Correspondance inédite de la comtesse de Sabran et du chevalier de Boufflers: 1778-1788 / recueillie et publiée par E. de Magnieu et Henri Prat, Paris: E. Plon, p. 526
- Boufflers, Stanislas-Jean de; Boufflers, Françoise Éléonore de (2009), Carrell, Sue (ed.), Le lit bleu: correspondance, 1777-1785 / la comtesse de Sabran et le chevalier de Boufflers, Paris: Tallandier, p. 265, ISBN 978-2-84734-492-9
- Boufflers, Françoise Éléonore; Boufflers, Stanislas-Jean de (2010), Carrell, Sue (ed.), La promesse: correspondance, 1786-1787 / la comtesse de Sabran et le chevalier de Boufflers, Paris: Tallandier, p. 587, ISBN 978-2-84734-643-5

== In literature ==
F. L. Lucas's poem 'A Tale of Two Centuries' in his From Many Times and Lands (1953) is about Eléonore and her daughter Delphine de Custine.

== Sources ==
- BOUFFLERS Françoise Éléonore, marquise de (1750-1827) (in French), Association des Amis et Passionnés du Père-Lachaise, archived from the original on 2017-12-01
- Ferraton, Jacques (April 2010), "Comtesse de Sabran - Chevalier de Boufflers", Le Bulletin des Lettres, revue de critique littéraire (in French), archived from the original on 2017-12-01
- Françoise Éléonore de Boufflers (1750-1827) (in French), Bibliotheque nationale de France
- Palmas, Jean Pierre de, "Françoise Eléonore Dejean de Manville", geneanet (in French)
- Pascal, Jean-Noël (October 2011), "Review: Le Lit bleu, correspondance 1777-1785, La Promesse, correspondance 1786-1787", Revue d'Histoire littéraire de la France, 111e Année (4), Presses Universitaires de France, JSTOR 41426949
