= Hope (Esperança) Booker =

17th-century Gambian woman

- Born: c. 1675
- Died: after 1707

Hope (Esperança) Booker (c. 1675 – after 1707) was a Gambian woman who rose from child slavery to become a prominent figure in the Royal African Company's sphere of trade.

Booker began her life as a child slave to John Booker, who had at the time been an agent for England's Royal African Company (RAC). When John Booker died in June 1693, Hope Booker became his executrix. Shortly after, Booker dated another RAC agent named William Heath, and they married in March 1694 and had one son. After that, when William Heath died that December, an inheritance controversy arose, but the second marriage was declared lawful.

In 1697, Hope Heath (formerly Booker) went back to Gambia. Her last mention in the history books dates to 1707, so her fate after that is unknown. However, Hope Heath left behind a legacy as a successful woman despite the Atlantic slave trade.

== Historical background ==
Signares, or senhoras, like Esperance, were women in the African Atlantic world who lived along the Senegambian coast and held power, status, and wealth within their societies. Signares held great amounts of property, both housing and slaves. Signares created powerful social bonds and status through their advantageous marriages to European traders and merchants. Wolof marriages allowed women freedom to remarry in the event of their husband's death or departure from Africa. Because of this, these marriages allowed women to hold status in their respective societies. These connections possibly existed as a form of survival, or as a demonstration of personal gain and mobility due to Europeans increased presence in the continent.

Signares could gain their position through avenues other than marriages to European men, as seen through Hope Booker. Hope became a signare through John Booker, whom she had been enslaved to until his death. Upon Booker's passing, Hope inherited many possessions that allowed her to have a comfortable life and set her up for a marriage to William Heath and later Samuel Meston. Due to her immediate departure to and prolonged stay in England, she did not wield the title of signare immediately upon John Booker's death. But, upon her return to James Island, people addressed her as Madam Esperance, and she gained social mobility and respect. As many other signares, Hope established social connections and played an important role in society due to her wealth and trading connections.

== Early life ==
Esperança, or Hope Booker, was born around 1675. Hope grew up on the Senegambian Coast at a time before formal colonialism, during the height of the Atlantic Slave Trade. The geographic position of the Senegambian coast created opportunities for European merchants and traders to establish themselves. The Gambia River provided a crucial point of contact for European traders who wished to trade further inland, and the English and French established trading ports along the Senegambian coast and rivers. Hope began her life by the name of Esperança, serving as a child slave to John Booker. Booker obtained Hope through purchase or as a gift alongside another slave, António Lopez. At this time, the Royal African Company (RAC), chartered in England, existed as one of the largest trading companies out of Africa. While the company had many forts, James Island was one of the larger trading posts. Booker served as an agent within England's Royal African Company, and in 1680 Booker arrived on James Island in the Gambia River, though it is unclear if Booker had obtained Hope by then. During this time, Booker secretly profited from private trading endeavors against company policy, amassing him a large amount of wealth.

During her time on James Island, Hope served as Booker's household servant. Sometime within the early 1680s Booker sent Hope to a boarding school in England, though the exact school is unknown. In England, Hope learned how to read and write in English, likely for the benefit of Booker to have Hope serve as his personal scribe. Within her time in England, Esperança received the name Hope by English speakers with Booker as her surname.

Booker originally served under Alexander Cleeve within the trade operations in the RAC upon his arrival to James Island. In 1688, Cleeve departed for London and Booker succeeded him as one of the lead RAC agents. In preparation for his new position, Booker traveled to London to create a will. Booker appointed Humphrey Dyke and Dyke's daughter Elizabeth as the executors of his will. Hope was thirteen when Booker was promoted. Booker's promotion gave Hope access to his personal and household accounts that allowed Hope to manage commercial responsibilities. Hope's early exposure to commercial accounts allowed Hope early practice in merchant work.

In June 1693, John Booker died and labeled Hope as his executrix. Hope was around eighteen years old at the time. Booker bequeathed Hope with her freedom unconditionally. Hope inherited her personal wardrobe, valuable jewelry, possession of Booker's house and company slaves, and a lifetime annuity of £25. Booker left his slaves with another company worker until Hope's further orders. Booker intended for Hope to be sent to England and cared for by acquaintances in London.

== First marriage ==
Upon the death of her former enslaver, John Booker, Hope Booker met an RAC agent named William Heath. William Heath and Hope Booker worked together to manage funerary arrangements for John Booker. Sometime between John Booker's death in June of 1693 and October of 1693, William courted Hope. The two married in accordance with local customs of the Senegambian Coast, although they agreed to marry again in a Christian ceremony when possible. The Christian marriage ceremony took place in October of 1693. Both Hope and William indicated their Christianity through a declaration of their love before God. During her first marriage, documents referenced her as Hope Heath.

In March of 1694, Hope Heath moved without her husband to London, England. There she gave birth to and christened her daughter, Elizabeth Heath. Euro-African marriages like Hope and William's resulted in a class of mixed-race children, as their daughter was, called Metis. They enjoyed the privileges of kinship ties to Europeans and Senegal. They often received a Western education and dual citizenship, symbolizing the mixing of cultures while acting as intermediaries on either side. William promised to join hope in London after he finished carrying out John Booker's will. William started on his way to London but died at sea in the final leg of his trip in December of 1694. At the time of her first husband's death, Hope was around 20 years old and her daughter had recently had her first birthday.

== Inheritance controversy ==
At the time of William Heath's death in 1694, he had not written a will. Because William helped to manage the estate of the late John Booker, questions of inheritance for both Heath's and Booker's estates arose. The original executor of Booker's will, Humphrey Dyke, presented the Prerogative Court of Canterbury with a copy of the codicil in 1695. William Heath's brother, Samuel, submitted a complaint to the court which cited Hope Heath, Humphrey Dyke, William Collins, and Richard Hutchinson as conspirators involved in defrauding him of his right to William's estate. Samuel's complaint referred to Hope as "Sparnissa" and asserted that she lived with William as a hired servant, not as his wife. Humphrey Dyke refuted Samuel's claim using correspondence between interested parties. The letters, many of which addressed Hope as “Mrs. Heath,” originated from William, William's family, and Humphrey Dyke.

Additionally, Hope wrote her own testimony, which was uncommon for Euro-African women at the time. In the testimony, Hope insisted upon the usage of her English married name, Hope Heath. Hope Heath was also her 1696 baptismal name. The court ruled that Hope and William's marriage was legitimate and that Elizabeth Heath had legitimate parentage. The court also gave Dyke authority over the administration of William's personal estate. In May of 1697, Hope consulted another party who traded with Booker and Heath, Richard Hutchinson. The two filed for the court to remove Dyke as an administrator of Heath's estate as Hope wished to execute it herself. Dyke resisted the effort in court, but ultimately, Hope and her second husband resolved the issue with Dyke without legal intervention.

== Return to Gambia ==
After the celebration of her second marriage to Samuel Meston at St James Dukes Place in London in 1697, Hope Meston returned to Gambia. It is unknown why Hope left London, but scholars posit that it was an effort to collect the remaining inheritance from Booker's and Heath's estates. Madame Esperance, as Hope appeared in RAC accounts from 1698, selected a male slave and a multitude of personal items as collection of her inheritance. Hope owned a house in Juffure, managed slaves, and worked as a merchant. On one account, Hope involved herself with an RAC agent accused of embezzlement, Chishull. The investigator dismissed the inquiry due to Madame Esperance's [sic] good standing with the company.

== Death ==
The death of Hope Booker is unknown. The last mention of Hope was recorded in English Court records from 1707 that stated why Hope returned to Gambia and where she resided. Within Gambia, Hope presented herself as an important, titled woman that had power to control local trade. Hope also possessed wealth in silver, coral, silk, property, and slaves at the time of her last documentation.

== Legacy ==
Hope's identity as Madam Esperance signified her status as a successful woman within commercial activity in Gambia. Hope had authority over male labor with personal wealth that allowed her to successfully position herself in the upper class of Gambian society. Hope was highly skilled within Guinean trade where she managed credit and debt. Weaveer, an agent within the trade company, deemed Hope to be in good standing with the company. Hope's status as Madam Esperance is noted by many scholars through the title of signare, a powerful woman who controlled activity in commerce within port cities. Hope's marriage to William Heath exemplified cross-cultural marriages that African women made with European traders, though their original plans were to reside in England. Heath's death provided Hope the option to stay in England, though she chose to return to Gambia and remain within commercial trade. Records of Hope showed her self-identity and choices to live within the multicultural world developed by the Atlantic trade as a successful independent woman.

== Names ==
- Esperança Booker
- Esperançe Booker
- Hope Booker
- Hope Heath
- Hope Meston
- Madam Espernaçe
- Sparnissa
