= Anne Pépin =

Senegalese signare

- Born: c. 1747
- Died: 1837
- Occupation: signare
- Spouse: Bernard Dupuy
- Children: Renée Dupuy
- Parents: Jean Pépin (father); Catherine Baudet (mother)

Anne Pépin (c. 1747 – 1837) was the richest and most celebrated woman on the West African island of Gorée in French Senegal. Pépin, born to a European man and an African woman, was born into the Afro-European class known as habitants. In 1786, she entered a relationship with the governor Stanislas de Boufflers at the same time that he moved the capital of Senegal from Saint Louis to Gorée. Pépin held the designation of signare, a prestigious social and economic designation for women who formed partnerships with European men and, as such, wielded great power. Pépin lived in the "golden age of the habitants, and her life illustrates how this class functioned as an intermediary group in Afro-European relations."

== Life ==
Anne Pépin was born in 1747 to signare Catherine Baudet and Jean Pépin, a surgeon for the French East India Company. Among Anne's five siblings was the trader Nicholas Pépin, a leading figure of the island and often acted as the spokesperson of Gorée in their dealings with the French authorities. While Nicholas was literate, evidence suggests that Anne was not, illustrating education norms on the island.

By the age of 14, she was married to a European man, Bernard Dupuy. Together, they had four sons: René (1773–1820), two boys who died young, and Jean (b. 1777). Official records designated the marriages as á la mode du pays ('according to local custom'). As was the custom in Gorée, she did not take the name of her husband herself but nevertheless had her child take her husband's name. Legally, mixed-race children and female companions of European men could inherit their wealth, so when Dupuy fled an outbreak of yellow fever, Pépin inherited his wealth and became an independent woman living in a large house.

She belonged to the leading figures of the signare community on Gorée, which played an important part in the French slave trade. Her brother built his home, known as the Maison des Esclaves, for the family slave trade business on the island. While no records exist that show that Pépin or her brother were involved directly with the slave trade, they provided the logistical and material support for the trade on the island.

Anne Pépin owned multiple properties in her lifetime. Her principal household was approximately the same size as her brother's house, a famous house built in a mixed Italo-Provence style. It is not believed that any of her properties remain intact today. As with other signares, she would have participated in the slave trade, but she is also known to have traded in gum arabic, which was officially banned but unofficially condoned by the French. Similar to other signares, she acquired land and houses, which she rented out to the French.

In 1786, Pépin entered a relationship with Stanislas de Boufflers, who was the French governor from 1786 to 1787. Whether they actually had a sexual relationship is not confirmed. The relationship between a Frenchman and a signare did not exclusively signify a sexual union, but the signare and her slaves provided her French client with housing and domestic services such as washing. De Boufflers may have lived in her house, and she functioned as his hostess for several festivities. De Boufflers moved the capital of Senegal to Gorée, officially due to the climate, but possibly for its proximity to Pépin. This move increased the value of her property and increased her position on the island and her influence in the region. De Boufflers did not mention Pépin in his writings, which could suggest he was taking advantage of her, but she likely entered the relationship willingly due to the benefit for her.

Pépin became very wealthy in her lifetime, amassing a fortune that included her properties and several enslaved domestic servants. Her will included an inventory that listed 71 wraparound scarves known as pagnes, 47 colored scarves, elaborate conical headdresses (worn to signify wealth as one could not wear it and do manual labor such as carrying water on the head), a considerable quantity of jewelry, and more than 40 place settings and chairs, showing that she entertained on a grand scale.

The only surviving description of her house was recorded by a Swiss botanist, Samuel Brunner (1790–1844), after attending a party Pépin hosted in 1835 near the end of her life:

The main salon with its two side rooms, was decorated as described above, quite spacious and illuminated by a chandelier and numerous wall-sconce. The room was jammed with people, and it was with great difficulty that I made my way to pay my respects to the host. With every fifteen minutes, the crowd grew larger. Sitting in small groups were the yellow-brown Signares, a few European women, and even more blacks. Getting closer to the stairs, the curious mob mingled and loitered about, so crowded that only one more accustomed than I could distinguish freeman from slave. The orchestra consisted of a single scratchy violin, played by a watchman from the garrison.

She should not be confused with her niece, Anna Colas Pépin, who became known for a similar relationship with François d'Orléans, Prince of Joinville.

== Legacy ==
The stories of Anne Pépin and other habitants like her illustrate how mixed-race signares were able to gain influence and act as intermediaries between Europeans and Africans. Their familiarity with the laws and customs of the two cultures made them incredibly influential.

Anne Pépin appears in Segu, a historical novel written by Maryse Condé, under the stereotypical traits of the beautiful and aspiring but neglected signare. She makes her first appearance in chapter 9, part I:

As she lay on a mat on the balcony of her house on Gorée Island, Anne Pépin felt bored. She had been bored for ten years, ever since her lover, the Chevalier de Boufflers, who had been governor of the island, went back to France. He had amassed enough money to marry his fair friend the Comtesse de Sabran; Anne still lay awake at night thinking about his ingratitude. She couldn't forget that a few months she had ridden high – given parties, masked balls and theatrical entertainments like those at the court of the king of France. But now it was all over and here she was, abandoned on his chunk of basalt dumped in the sea off Cape Verde, the only French settlement in Africa apart from Saint-Louis at the mouth of the Senegal River.

== Sources ==
- Jean Luc Angrand, Céleste ou le temps des Signares, Éditions Anne Pépin.
- Hinchman, Mark. "House and Household on Gorée, Senegal, 1758–1837". Journal of the Society of Architectural Historians. 65, no. 2: 166–187. https://doi.org/10.2307/25068263.
- Hinchman, Mark. Portrait of an Island: The Architecture and Material Culture of Gorée ...
- Joseph Roger de Benoist et Abdoulaye Camara, "Les signares et le patrimoine bâti de l'île", dans Abdoulaye Camara & Joseph Roger de Benoist, Histoire de Gorée, Maisonneuve & Larose, 2003
- Lorelle Semley, To be Free and French: Citizenship in France's Atlantic Empire
- Guillaume Vial, Les signares à Saint-Louis du Sénégal au xixe siècle: étude critique d'une identité métisse, Université de Reims, 2 vols, Mémoire de maîtrise, 1997
