= Auquainville =

- Part of Livarot-Pays-d'Auge
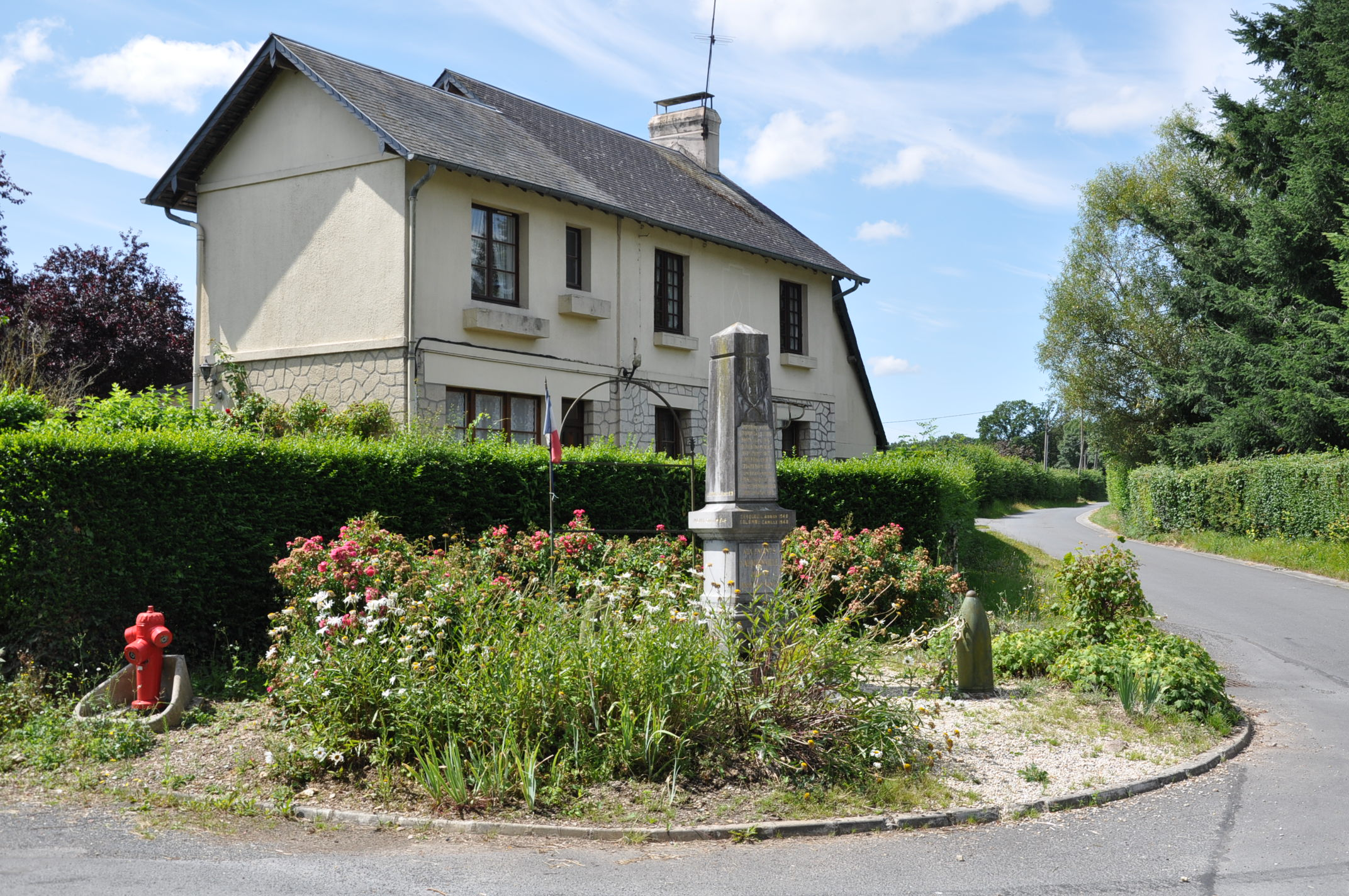
- The centre of Auquainville
- Location of Auquainville
- Location within France Location within Normandy
- Coordinates: 49°03′27″N 0°14′24″E
- Country: France
- Region: Normandy
- Department: Calvados
- Arrondissement: Lisieux
- Canton: Livarot-Pays-d'Auge
- Commune: Livarot-Pays-d'Auge
- Area^{1}: 9.56 km^{2} (3.69 sq mi)
- Elevation: 250 m (820 ft)
- Highest elevation: 184 m (604 ft)
- Lowest elevation: 67 m (220 ft)
- Population (2022): 292
  - Density: 30.5/km^{2} (79.1/sq mi)
- Time zone: UTC+01:00 (CET)
  - Summer (DST): UTC+02:00 (CEST)
- Postal code: 14140
- ^{1} French Land Register data, which excludes lakes, ponds, glaciers > 1 km^{2} (0.386 sq mi or 247 acres) and river estuaries.

Auquainville (French pronunciation: [okɛ̃vil]) is a former commune in the Calvados department in the Normandy region of north-western France. On 1 January 2016, it was merged into the new commune of Livarot-Pays-d'Auge.

== Geography ==
Auquainville is located some 10 km south of Lisieux and 13 km west by north-west of Orbec. Access to the commune is by the D149 road which comes from Saint-Martin-de-Mailloc in the north-east and passes south through the commune and the village continuing to Livarot in the south-west. The D64 road comes from Saint-Martin-de-la-Lieue in the north and passes south through the east of the commune to Fervaques. The D135B branches east off the D64 in the commune and joins the D135 just east of the commune. Apart from the village, there are the hamlets of La Blondeliere in the west with Le Mollants and Le Maubuisson in the east. The commune is mixed forest and farmland with a particularly large forest to the west of the village (the Bois des Grandes Ventes).

The Touques river passes through the commune from south to north just east of the village and continues north to join the ocean at Trouville-sur-Mer. The Ruisseau de la Marette rises in the commune and flows east into the Touques.

== History ==
In 1831, Auquainville (456 inhabitants) merged with Saint-Aubin-sur-Aquainville (91 inhabitants). Saint-Aubin-sur-Auquainville was south of Auquainville.

== Administration ==
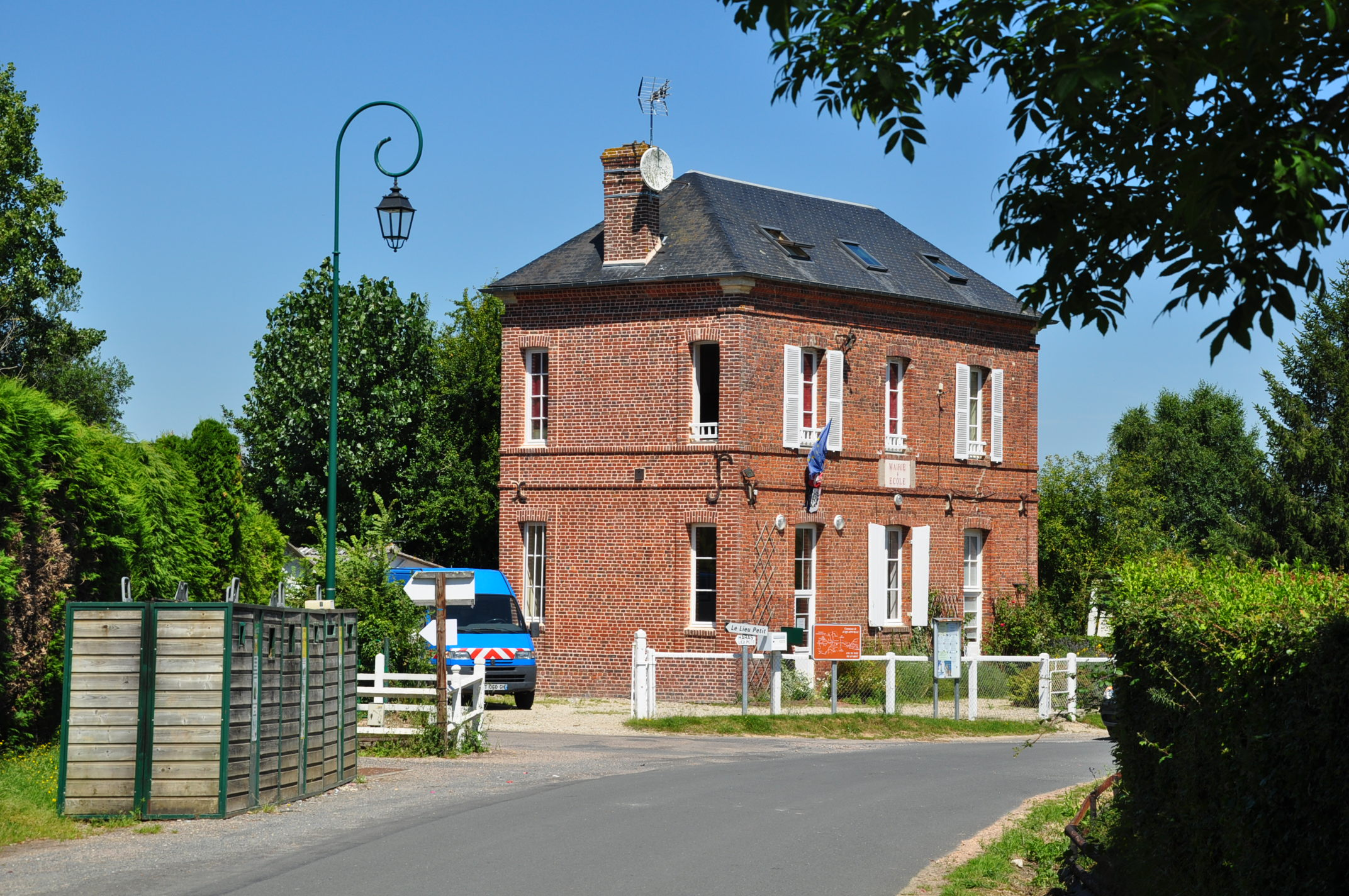
The Town Hall

List of Successive Mayors

From	To	Name	Party	Position
1983	2014	Raymond Géret		Farmer
2014	2016	Philippe Soetaert		

== Demography ==
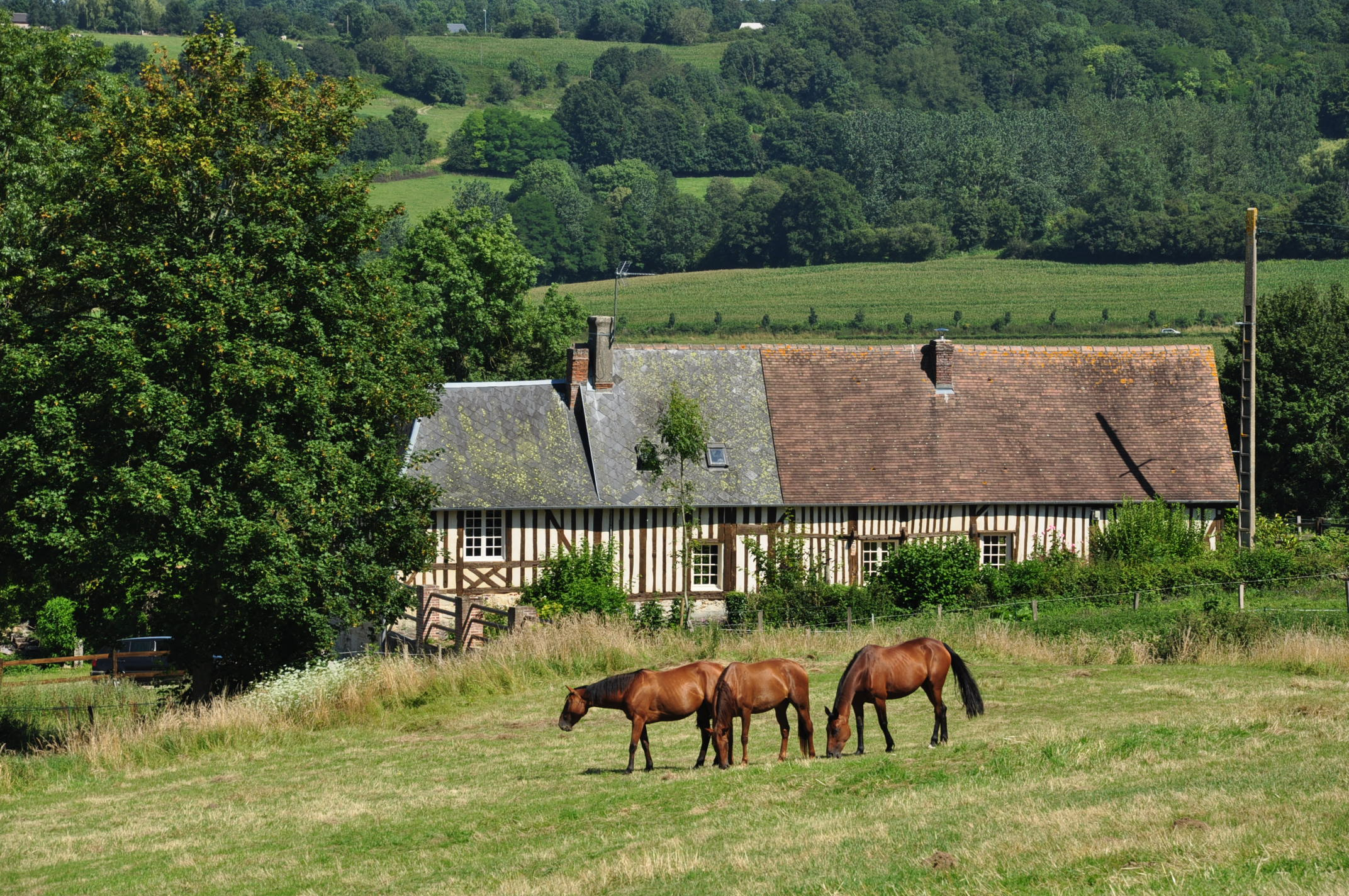
Auquainville landscape

The inhabitants of the commune are known as Auquainvillais or Auquainvillaises in French.

Historical population

Year	Pop.	±% p.a.
1793	578	—
1800	507	−1.85%
1806	639	+3.93%
1821	507	−1.53%
1831	456	−1.05%
1836	500	+1.86%
1841	452	−2.00%
1846	454	+0.09%
1851	393	−2.84%
1856	374	−0.99%
1861	371	−0.16%
1866	421	+2.56%
1872	388	−1.35%
1876	367	−1.38%
1881	284	−5.00%
1886	330	+3.05%
1891	287	−2.75%
1896	245	−3.11%

Year	Pop.	±% p.a.
1901	247	+0.16%
1906	265	+1.42%
1911	239	−2.04%
1921	216	−1.01%
1926	225	+0.82%
1931	207	−1.65%
1936	204	−0.29%
1946	262	+2.53%
1954	223	−1.99%
1962	240	+0.92%
1968	213	−1.97%
1975	180	−2.38%
1982	228	+3.43%
1990	249	+1.11%
1999	258	+0.40%
2007	301	+1.95%
2012	312	+0.72%
2022	292	−0.66%

Source: EHESS and INSEE

== Culture and heritage ==
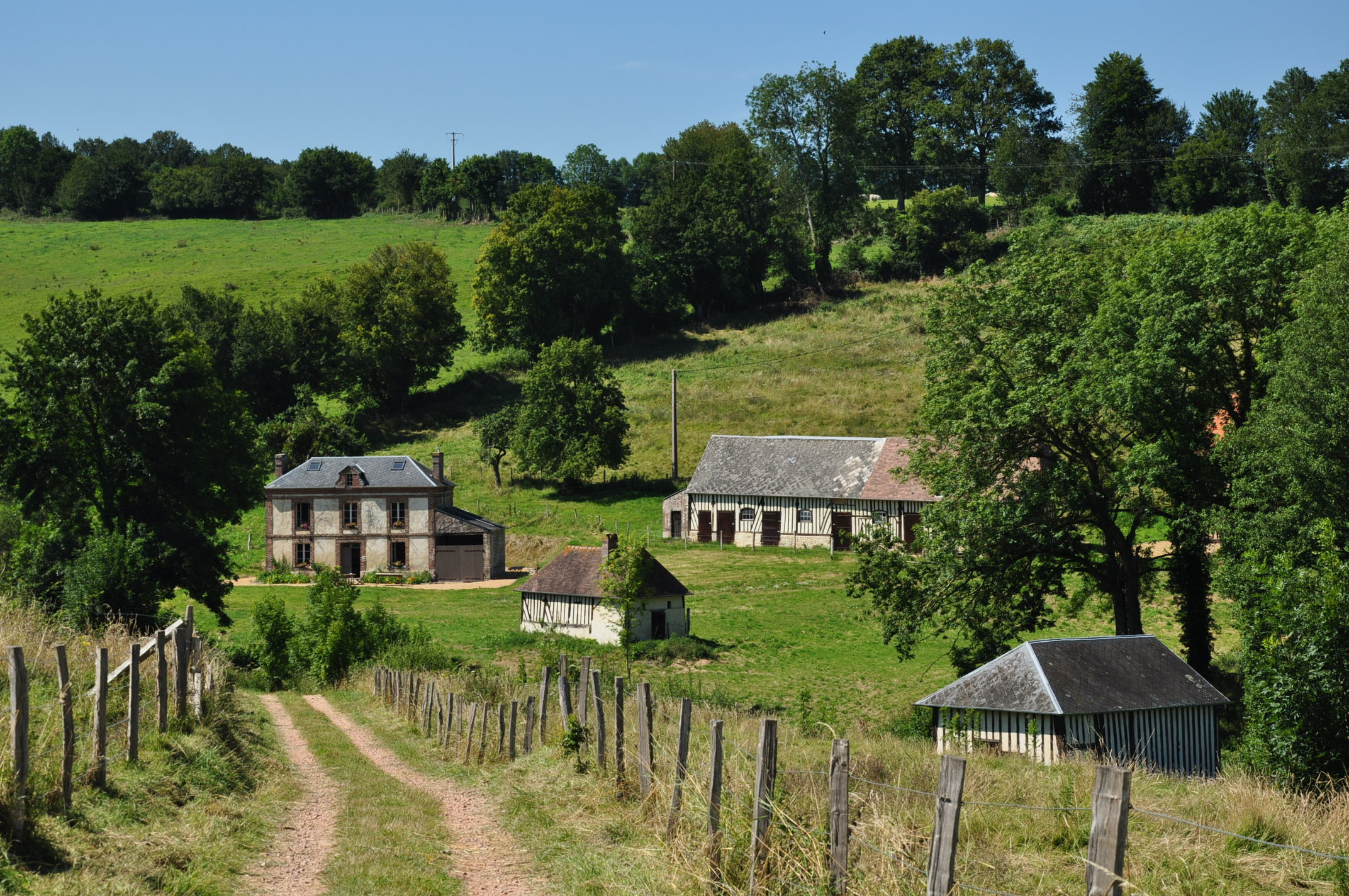
Auquainville landscape

=== Civil heritage ===
The commune has a number of buildings and structures that are registered as historical monuments:

- Lortier Manor (17th century)
- Caudemone Manor (15th century)
- A Mill for Fuller's Earth (19th century)

=== Religious heritage ===
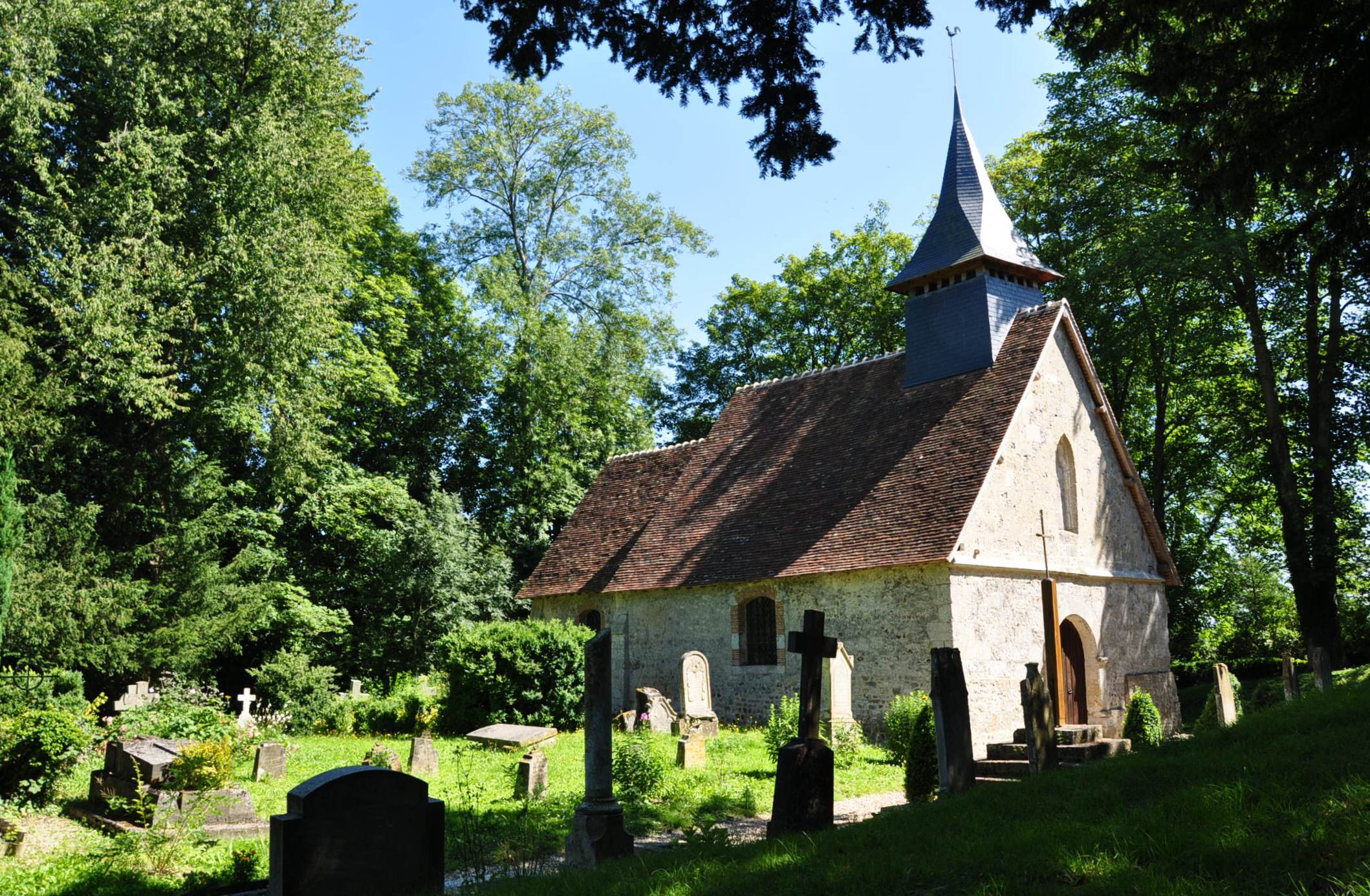
The Church of Saint Aubin

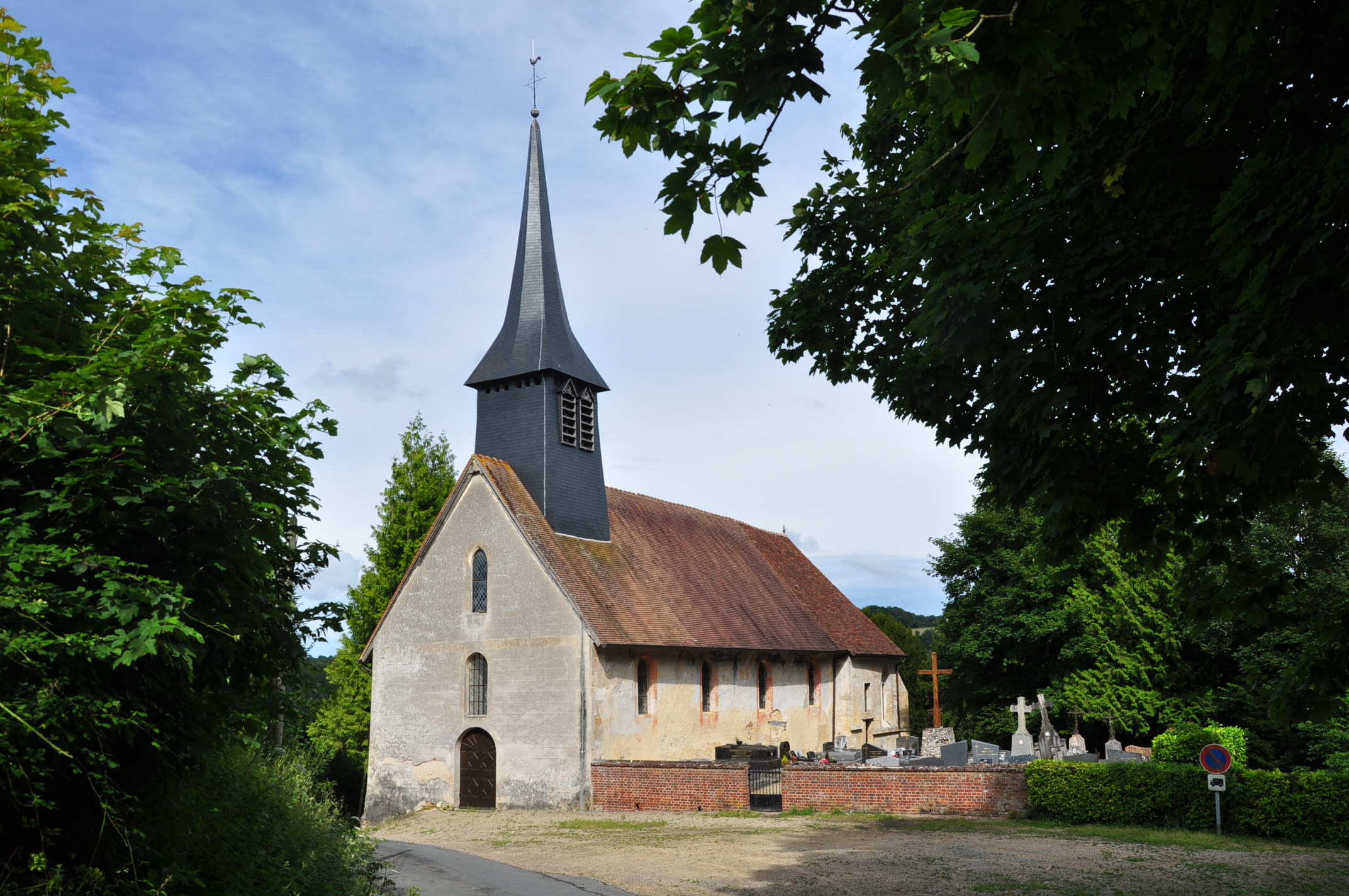
The Church of Notre-Dame

The commune has several religious buildings and structures that are registered as historical monuments:

- The Church of Saint Aubin (15th century). The church was decommissioned when Saint-Aubin-sur-Auquainville was incorporated into the commune of Auquainville in 1831 and was then used as a burial chapel by the Custine family. The choir with a flat apse indicates the building is from the late Middle Ages. It has a single nave and tower sitting on the western gable. The windows and door have without doubt been re-engineered in the 18th century. Inside, the building has retained all of its former layout. The Church contains many items that are registered as historical objects:
  - The Main Altar, seating, Tabernacle urn, Retable, an Altar Painting: the Agony of Christ in the garden of olives, and 2 Statues of St. Aubin and St. Sebastian (1787)
  - A Secondary Altar, seating, Retables, and 2 Statues of the Virgin and St. Quentin (18th century)
- The Church of Notre-Dame (15th century). The Church contains many items that are registered as historical objects:
  - A Retable (17th century)
  - A Group Sculpture: Education of the Virgin (17th century)
  - A Retable (17th century)
  - A Painting: The Annunciation (17th century)
  - A Retable (17th century)
  - A Tabernacle (17th century)
  - A fragment of Stained glass (16th century)
  - A Painting: The placing in the tomb (17th century)
  - A Painting: The martyrdom of Saint Ursula (17th century)
  - An Altar (17th century)
  - An Altar (17th century)
  - The Altar facing (17th century)
  - The Altar wood carving of the Annunciation (17th century)
- The Church of Saint Pierre has a number of items that are registered as historical objects:
  - A Stained glass window with a lady's head (16th century)
  - Decorative stained glass (19th century)
  - 2 Stained glass windows: St. John and St. Mark and St. Matthew and St. Luke (19th century)
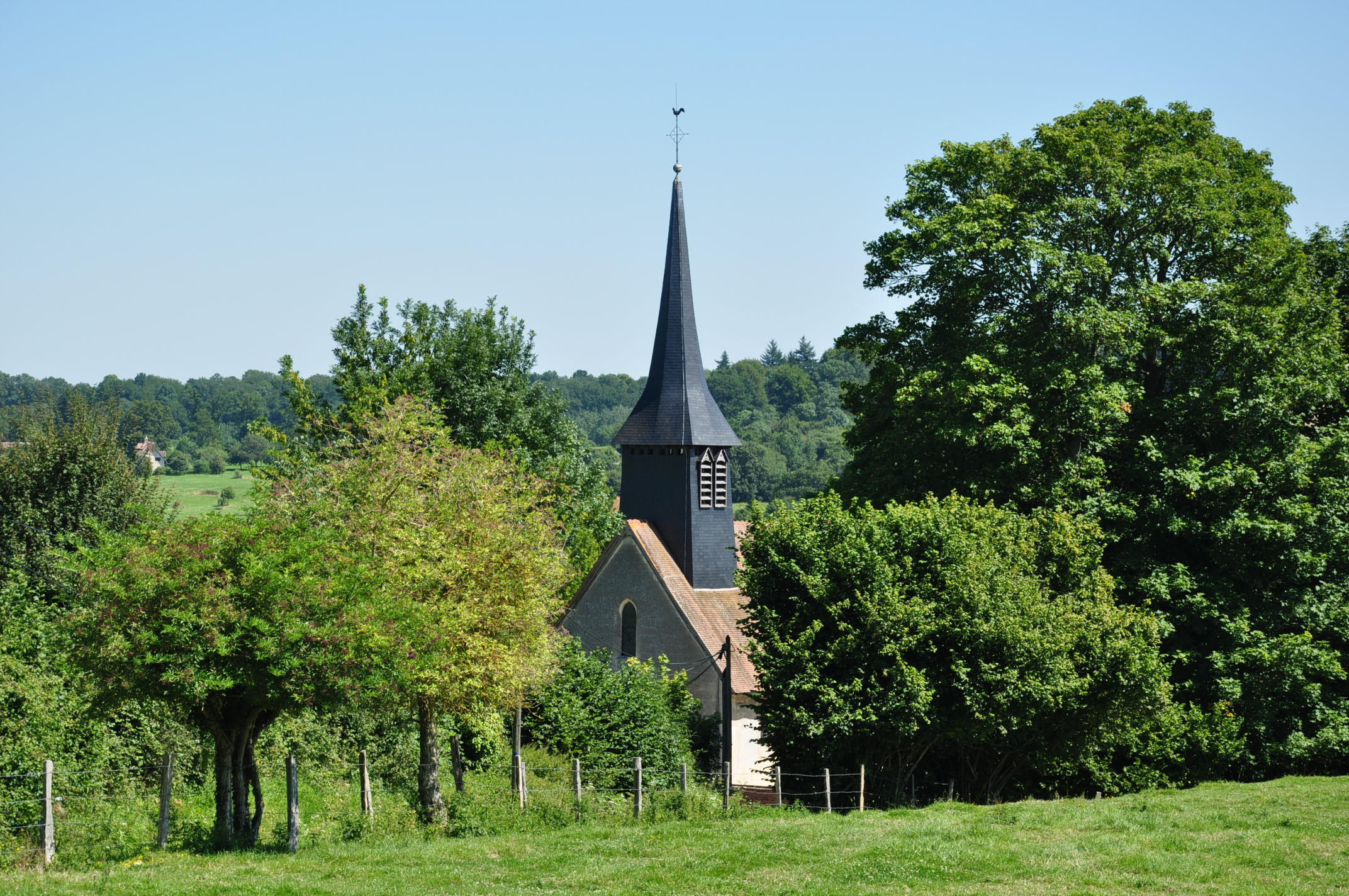
Church of Notre Dame

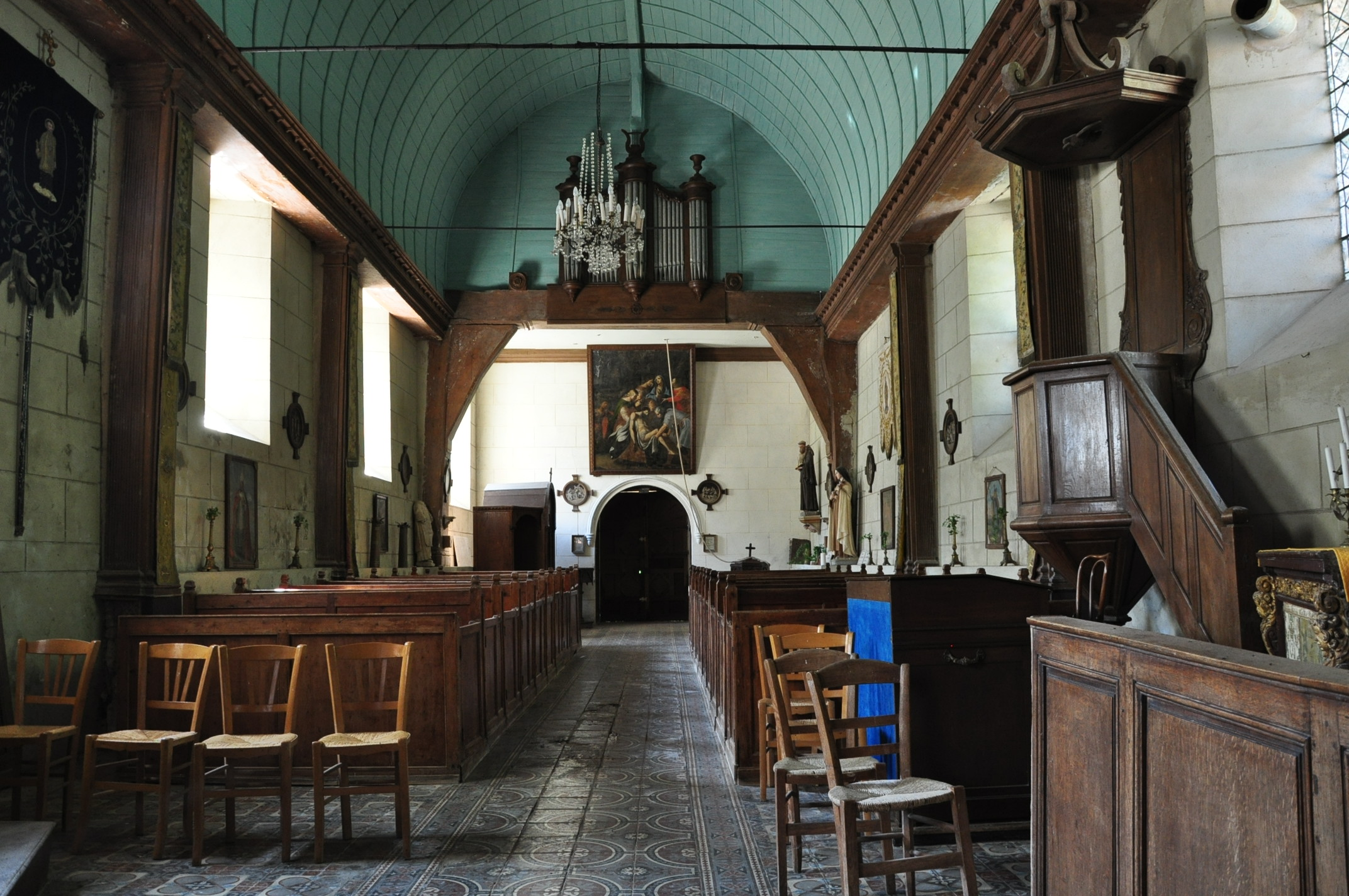
Church of Notre Dame: the Nave

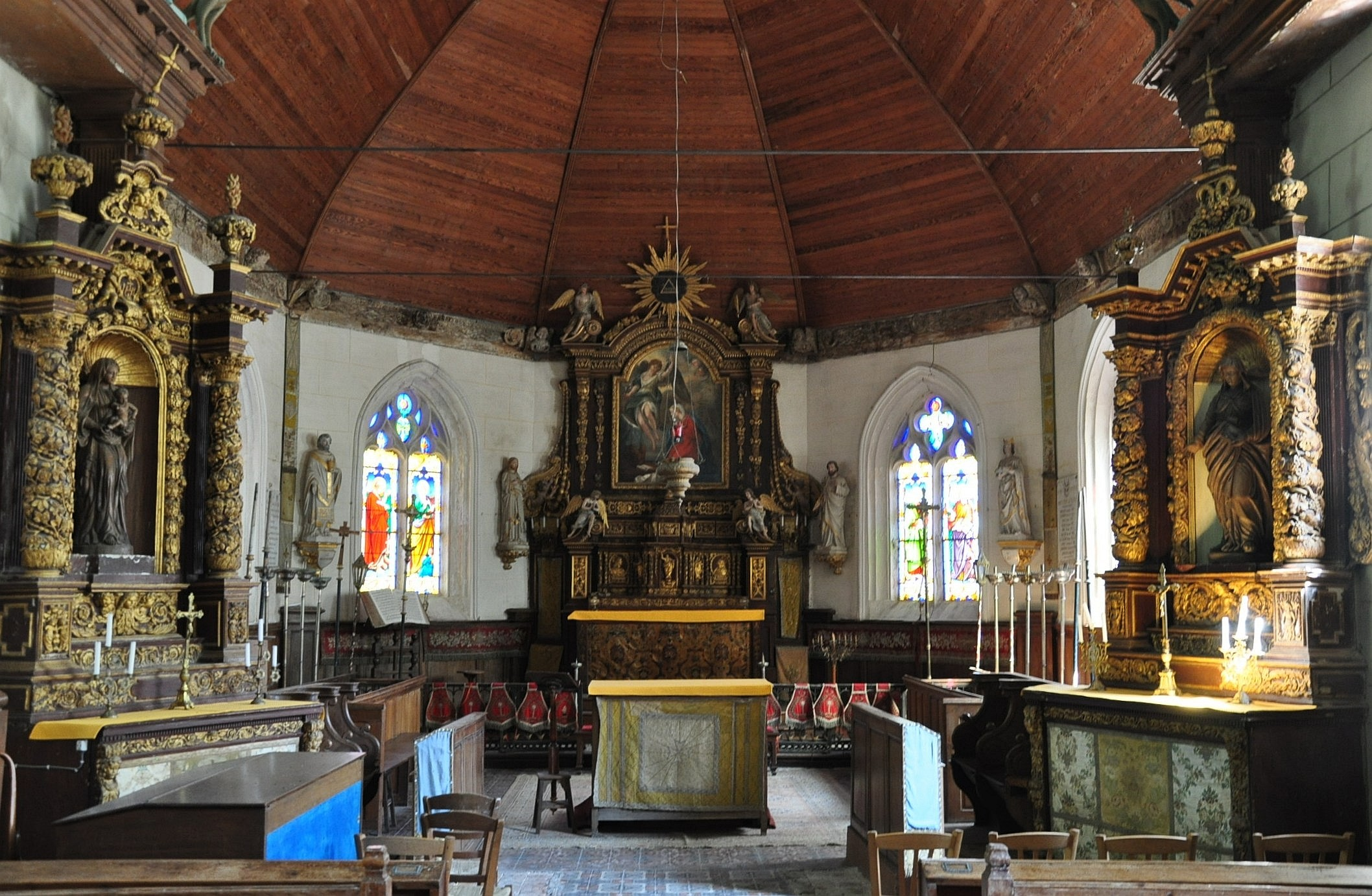
Church of Notre Dame: the Altar

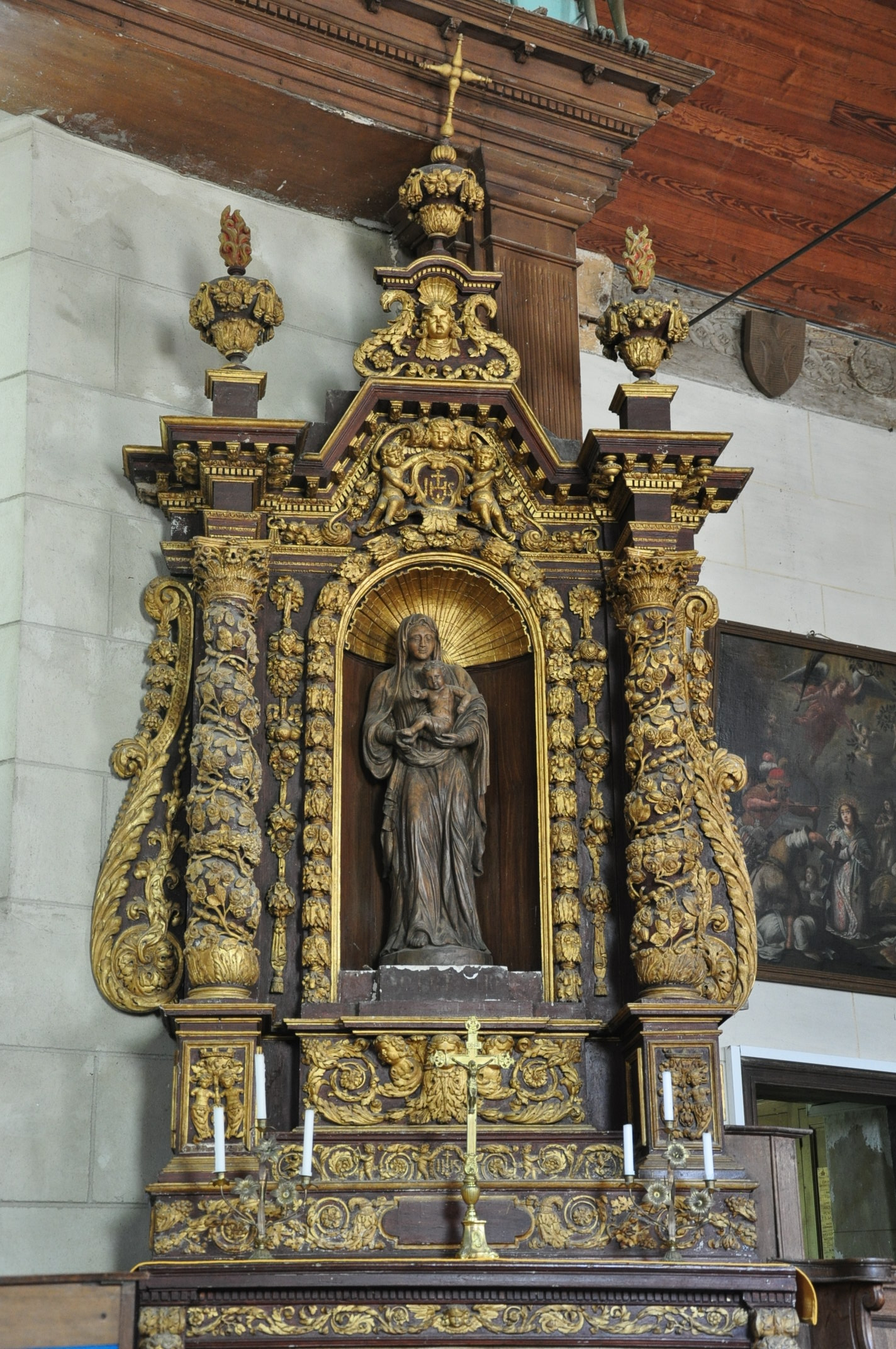
Church of Notre Dame: Altar detail

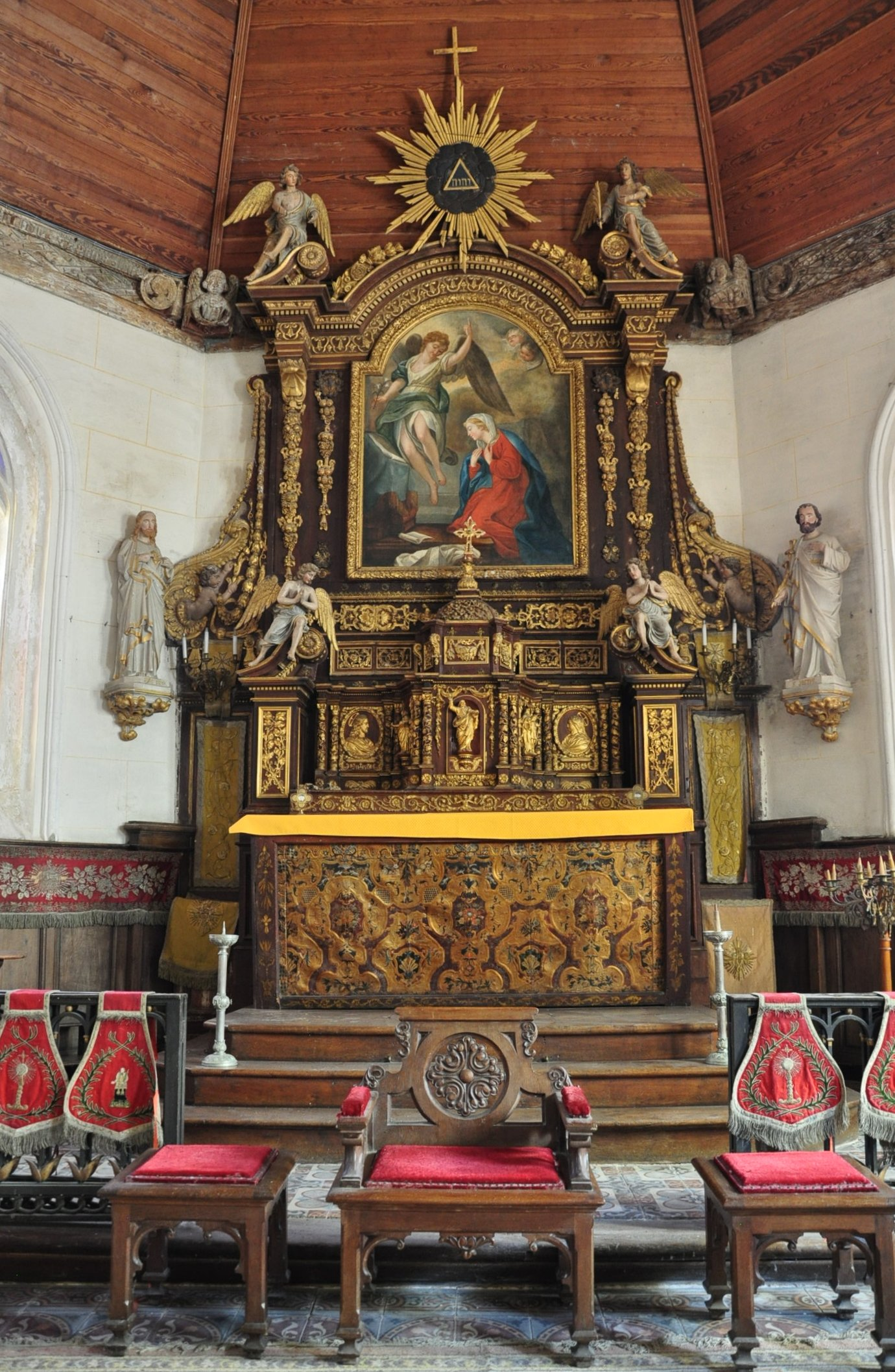
Church of Notre Dame: Altar detail

== Notable people linked to the commune ==
- Astolphe Louis Léonor, Marquis de Custine (1790-1857), writer, is buried in the Chapel of Saint-Aubin-sur-Auquainville.

== See also ==
- Communes of the Calvados department

=== External links ===
- Auquaniville on the 1750 Cassini Map (N.B. Misspelt on the map)
