= Caty Louette =

African signara and businessperson

Catty Louette
- Born: C. 1713; Goree, French
- Occupations: Businesswoman; Slave Trader
- Known for: Major figure in the 18th-century slave trader
- Partner: Pierre Aussenac de Carcassonne
- Parent(s): Nicolas Louet; Catty de Refisque

Caty Louette or Cathy Louët (c. 1713 – d. after 1776) was a signara and businessperson from the African continent. She is one of the more noted profiles of the signare community of Gorée.

Caty Louette was the daughter of the Frenchman Nicolas Louët, an official of the French East India Company, and his African signare-mistress Caty de Rufisque of Gorée. Her mother was perhaps the first Gorée-signare who is documented.

Louette became the signare-consort of the Frenchman Pierre Aussenac de Carcassone, an official of the French East India Company. Caty Louette has been described as one of the most successful and prominent profiles in the slave trade of Gorée. She could read and write, which was at the time not common, was described as the richest woman of the island and for some time the biggest slave owner of Gorée: in 1767, she owned 68 slaves in a community where most signares sold slaves rather than keeping them for their personal use. In 1756, she commissioned the eldest of the still-standing grand European stone houses which came to be so famous for Gorée in the 18th century.
