= From Many Times and Lands =

1953 poems by F. L. Lucas

- Author: F. L. Lucas
- Genre: historical poetry
- Publisher: The Bodley Head
- Publication date: April 1953
- Pages: 318

F. L. Lucas's From Many Times and Lands (1953) is a volume of some one hundred original poems, mostly dramatic monologues, vignettes, and narratives, based on historical episodes "that seem lastingly alive". Varying in length from sixteen pages to a few lines (most are two or three pages long), and written largely between 1935 and 1953, the poems were intended to show, in Lucas's words in the Preface, that "The Greeks were right. The essential theme is men in action. That has been the greatness of the West." They were thus a reaction to the "soul-scratching" interiority of mid-20th century modernist verse (The Times Literary Supplement's phrase). Lucas quotes approvingly "the wise Acton": 'History must be our deliverer, not only from the undue influence of other times, but from the undue influence of our own'. In one of the poems ('Ivan the Terrible') he has the explorer Anthony Jenkinson discuss with a number of English poets and playwrights in a London tavern in 1597 the authority of Marlowe's Tamburlaine as history:

"I try to find episodes in history that seem lastingly alive: and try to make them live on paper."... "We have had too many Narcissi murmuring unintelligibly over their own reflections in shallow, often muddy pools. 'I and she.' 'I and Nature.' 'I and God.' 'I and myself.' ..."
F. L. Lucas (1938, 1953)

... Give me a poet [says Jenkinson]
That holds the mirror, not to his own features,
But to the infinite mystery of men...
Often I think – 'Why should not poets be
Truthful as histories - and historians
Visioned as poets?'
You feed upon your dreams; they, on the world.
You live for feeling; and for knowledge they.
And each, alone, grows barren.

Jenkinson then goes on to speak of the impressions he took away from his meetings with Tsar Ivan IV.

== Title and subtitle ==
The book's title is taken from Swinburne's 'The Garden of Proserpine'. The dust-cover and back-strip of the first edition (but not the title-page) carried the subtitle 'Poems of Legend and History'. "They are not always factually true," wrote Lucas of these pieces. "But what men could believe, even falsely, is also part – and not the least part – of human history. Wherever historic facts are concerned, I have tried to distort them as little as possible. Where episodes are invented, I have tried to keep them true to the spirit of their time."

== Sources and dates ==
Approximate or exact dates appear below poem titles. Sources for incidents are given in footnotes to about half the poems. The note to 'Olver Barnakarl', for example, reads:

Cf. the Icelandic Landnáma-Bóc, V. 13. i: 'Olver Barnakarl was a nobleman in Norway. He would not let children be thrown on spearpoints, as was the Vikings' custom. Therefore he was called "Barnakarl" [:Bairns' man].'

== Some subjects treated ==
'Nemroud's Tower'	4th-3rd millennium B.C.	on Birs Nimrud
'The Eyes of Amenemhet'	c.1800 B.C.	on Amenemhat III
'The End of Akhnaton'	14th century B.C.	on Akhenaten and Nefertiti
'The Archaeologist-king'	539 B.C.	Nabonidus
'The Elbe frontier'	9 B.C.	Drusus the Elder
'The Pipe of Peace'	A.D. 315	Liu Kun
'The Smile that cost an Empire'	A.D. 755-6	Emperor Ming Huang and Yang Kwei-fei
'The Sister of Haroun'	803	Ja'far ibn Yahya, Harun al-Rashid, Zubaidah bint Ja'far
'Olver Barnakarl'	c.850	Olver Einarsson
'The Daughter of Firdausi'	1020-25	Ferdowsi
'The Lord of Athens'	1225	Othon and Isabelle de la Roche
'The End of Genghiz'	1227	Yelü Chucai and Genghis Khan
'The Grass of Cambalu'	1270	Kublai Khan
'Corrievreckan'	13th century	the Lords of Islay
'King Hal'	1421	Siege of Meaux, Sir John Cornwall, Henry V
'The Repentance of Gabrino Fondolo'	1425	Cabrino Fondulo
'History'	1420–1437	Catherine of Valois and Sir Owen Tudor
'The Last Hope of Constantinople'	1453	Fall of Constantinople
'Dusk of the Renaissance'	1463	Sigismondo Malatesta and Gemistos Plethon
'The lilied town'	1478	Florence and Botticelli
'New heavens and new earth'	c.1542	Columbus's remains, Luther, Copernicus
'Ivan the Terrible'	c.1597	Anthony Jenkinson on Tsar Ivan IV
'The Friend of Essex'	1600	Francis Bacon
'Stella's end'	1607	Penelope Devereux
'The Old Queen's Maid of Honour'	1613	Elizabeth I
'A tale of two centuries'	1786-1815	Eléonore de Sabron and Delphine de Custine
'The Doomed'	1775	Louis XVI
'Spain, 1809'	—	the Peninsular War
'The Buried Saviour'	1814-5	Napoleon
'Doom and the Poet'	November 17, 1820	Keats
'Wings of a Dove'	c.1855	Charles Darwin
'Rose of Parnell'	1880-91	Charles Stewart Parnell and Kitty O'Shea
'The Neutrality of Éire'	1939	Irish neutrality during World War II
'Leave'	1939	returning to Cambridge from Bletchley Park
'The dead of Oran'	1940	the attack on Mers-el-Kébir
'Before the landing in Normandy'	1944	eve of the Normandy landings

== Themes ==
A number of the longer poems explore the techniques of handling, one-to-one, dangerous people in positions of absolute power. Cases in point include the court poet Yuan Shen and Emperor Ming Huang in 'The Smile that cost an Empire'; Sir John Cornwall and Henry V (after the death of Sir John's son at the Siege of Maux) in 'King Hal'; Anthony Jenkinson and Tsar Ivan in 'Ivan the Terrible'; and counsellor Yeliu Chutsai and Genghiz Khan in 'The End of Genghiz'.

Typical in its message is 'The Last Hope of Constantinople', telling the story of the fast Greek sailing boat sent from Constantinople during the desperate last days of the siege in 1453, to scour the Greek coasts for news of the promised Venetian fleet coming to the city's rescue – and to report back. But there is no fleet. The captain, Michaelis Imvriotis, tells his eleven-man Greek crew that it is their duty to return to the doomed city. A heated debate on deck follows, with some men arguing that to return would be futile. The captain closes the argument with the words

"And yet when a man has lost all pride,
How can he still live happy? We were honest men till now.
What use is life, if each must dread
To meet men's eyes? Must hear in bed
His pillow whisper 'Coward !' – and his sick soul cry 'Amen !'?
Afraid are we all. Yet our call is clear."

A vote is taken – two against ten. A few days later, the boat is sighted slipping back through Turkish lines to the Neorion Quay. There is momentary joy in the city: surely the crew would only have returned if they had good news? But the cheering falters:

Men saw how watched eleven faces,
Pale and silent in their places,
Answering not to cheers nor praises –
In pity for that lost people, forgetting their own despair.

The missing crew member, Spiridion Sathas, who had argued for flight, has stolen away by night in the row-boat. He marries "a rich Venetian dame", and thirty years later dies a "noble merchant" in Venice. (Note: The story comes from Giornale dell' assedio di Costantinopoli, 1453, the diary of Nicolò Barbaro, who lived through the siege.)

== Verse forms ==
A variety of stanzaic forms, rhyme-schemes and metres are employed, as well as heroic couplets, blank verse, accentual verse, and free verse. The last stanza of 'The dead of Oran', on the funerals of French sailors killed in the Royal Navy's destruction of the French Fleet in 1940:

Far to the north the great men sit;

Laval in Vichy plies his pen.

But here a different greatness lives —
The faith, the courage, that forgives —

In simpler men.

== Reception ==
The Times Literary Supplement wrote of the volume: "The excitement is unequalled by any but a very few volumes of verse published these last few years. This is poetry written to be read aloud, to be relished for its information, to be taken to bed and read, like a detective novel, for the relaxation that comes from a good story well told... These are stories in poetry. The poetry is not the worse for the story, but the story is infinitely more compelling for being set in verse."

A notable example of such "compelling" story-telling occurs in 'A Tale of Two Centuries'. At the Revolutionary Tribunal in 1793 the public prosecutor Fouquier-Tinville, aware that the judges of the Comte de Custine are well disposed towards him because of the beauty of his daughter-in-law, Delphine de Custine, who attends the trial with him, has arranged for a mob to kill her as she leaves the Palais de Justice:

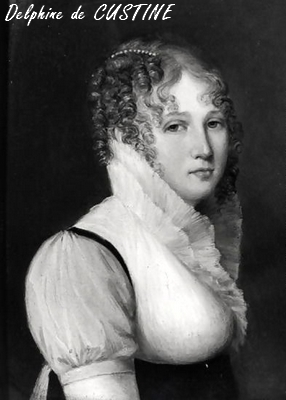
Delphine de Sabran, Marquise de Custine (1770 – 1826), subject of a dramatic narrative in From Many Times and Lands

Below its steps, a crowd was waiting there —
Louche ruffians, women with wolfish stare:
And there above, Delphine! — white face beneath golden hair.
At once she guessed: the worst of all her fears
Had been of crowds, even from earlier years;
And now to her mind the memory rose grim
Of the Princesse de Lamballe, torn limb from limb
By bony claws like these. And yet she knew
Courage alone perhaps might win her through...
Down those long steps she passed with tranquil tread.
How fast it narrowed now, the space between!
Then a voice howled — "The daughter of Custine
The traitor! Down with her!" Still on she passed,
Thinking "Oh, courage! Courage to the last — " ...
And now she was amidst them — by her side
There brushed a ragged fishwife, babe at breast;
She heard her own voice say, as if possessed,
"How sweet he is!" The woman met her look
And whispered "Take him!" With blind arms she took
That tiny burden, and passed on her way;
Quiet on her bosom that small saviour lay.
Face bent above him, through those wolves she came..."

The mob, momentarily dumb and bewildered by "some awe of womanhood, some touch of shame", watch her go, gain her carriage in the street below, silently pass the baby back to its mother, and drive away, "Saved by a child she nevermore would see".

== Reprints ==
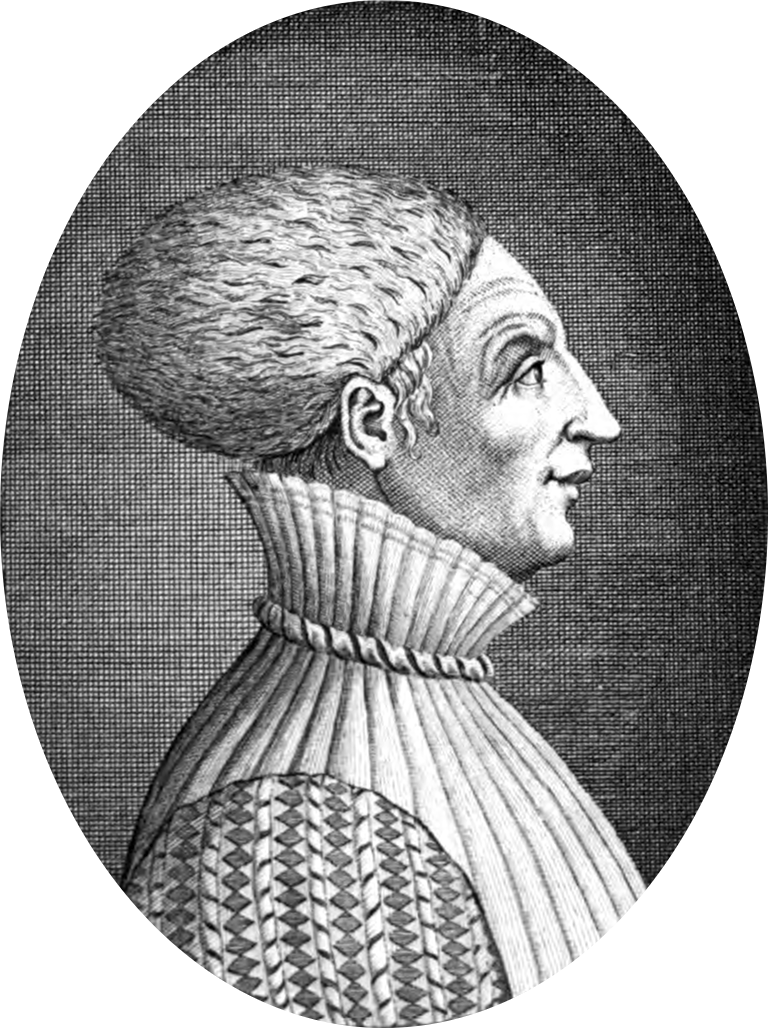
Cabrino Fondulo (1370-1425), Lord of Cremona, subject of a dramatic monologue in From Many Times and Lands

A number of the poems were reprinted in mid-20th century anthologies, notably two of the most gruesome: 'The Repentance of Gabrino Fondolo, Lord of Cremona', a Browning-esque dramatic monologue about Fondolo's regret, as he awaits execution, at the opportunity he missed of throwing the Pope, the Holy Roman Emperor, and the Doge from the top of Cremona tower on their joint visit to his city as guests; and 'Spain, 1809', the story of a village woman's revenge on some French soldiers during the Peninsular War, which Margaret Wood turned into a stage-play, A Kind of Justice (1966). Among poems reprinted that were based on legend rather than history was 'The Destined Hour' (1953), a re-telling in verse of the old Arabic 'Appointment in Samarra' fable.

== Background ==
In the mid-1930s the new Cambridge University Library opened next door to Lucas's home in West Road, giving him quick access to legal deposit books. "Looking back," he wrote in 1960, "I realise that I never enjoyed reading more than when writing From Many Times and Lands. To be able to read up connectedly, with an abundant library at hand, things like Egyptian or pre-Islamic Arab literature, or Chinese or Persian poetry, or the history of Genghiz or Tsar Ivan, made me realise what unsuspected treasure lies off the beaten track."
