= Crispina Peres =

West African slave trader

Crispina Peres (c. 1615 – after 1670) was a "Senhora" slave trader, natural from Geba, nowadays Guinea-Bissau.

Crispina Peres belonged to a lineage of African women traders, who operated in some of the main ports of the West African region, such as Guinguim, Farim, Cacheu and Geba. She actively participated in trade networks connected to regional and international routes. Crispina's main business was exchanging products from European traders for human beings. Portuguese and local traders sold these people to different parts of the Americas and Portugal. Operating her business from Cacheu, Crispina Peres was intrinsically connected to the slave trade and the Atlantic World between 1640 and 1668.

== Etymology ==
Crispina Peres is a Christian baptismal name given by her parents when she was baptized in Geba. She inherited her last name from her father, Rodrigo Peres Baltazar, a native of Terceira Island.

== Life ==
Crispina Peres was born in c.1615, in Geba. She was the daughter of Isabel Pessoa and Rodrigo Peres Baltazar. Crispina's mother and maternal grandparents were Bainuk, born in Guinguim (now Beguingue). Guinguim is located north of Cacheu, near the port of Buguendo, in São Domingo.

Crispina Peres's father was Rodrigo Peres Baltazar, a native of Terceira Island and a foreign trader who did business in Guinguim. Rodrigo Peres Baltazar met Isabel Pessoa (Crispina Peres' mother) in Guinguim, where they got married, and later moved to Geba, where Crispina was born. When Crispina was a teenager, her parents moved from Geba to Cacheu. Later, after Crispina married, her parents moved to Farim and Crispina remained in Cacheu. She had a brother, Antônio Peres Baltazar.

Around 1630-1635, Crispina Peres married Captain Francisco Nunes Dandrade, a slave trader, with whom she had three children: Rodrigo Nunes, George Nunes, and Cassila Nunes. In 1665, after the death of Francisco Nunes Dandrade, Crispina Peres married Jorge Gonçalves Frances, with whom she had only one daughter, Eleonor, who died as a baby. Jorge Gonçalves was born in Cacheu and not in Portugal.

Jorge Gonçalves Frances was the capitão-mor (Captain-General) of Cacheu. Together, they had an influential position. Crispina Peres controlled the trade between the Portuguese and the indigenous African rulers in the region and acted as a diplomatic mediator between them through her connections. Crispina Peres was a successful businesswoman. In addition to her residence, she owned a guest house for foreigners, a ship, and several households and enslaved people.

=== Imprisonment in Lisbon (1665-1668) ===
In 1665, Crispina Peres was transported from Cacheu to Cape Verde and then to Portugal. She was accused of practicing traditional rituals despite being a Catholic, an unusual incident of a member of a local person outside of Europe being taken to Portugal to stand trial before the Inquisition for heresy.

Crispina Peres spent three years in the prison of the Inquisition in Lisbon from 1665 to 1668. There, she endured all the hardships: she was tortured several times and seriously ill throughout 1666. Finally, after several inquiries and confessions, in March 1668, she was found guilty. Crispina Peres was sentenced for the crimes of “using sorcerers and their cures,” “using rites of kindness,” using “Mandinka cords,” and for having ordered a bag of herbs to place around the neck of her daughter who was sick.

Her sentence was read in the auto-da-fé, in Largo do Rossio, in the center of Lisbon, where she walked in procession wearing sanbenito, with a lighted candle in her hand, and listened to her penance. Then, finally, she was obliged to pay the expenses of the Court proceedings.

After doing her penance, she left on the first ship from Lisbon to Cacheu. Three months later, she arrived home, finding her husband Jorge Gonçalves even more ill. Shortly after her return, in 1668, Crispina Peres was widowed for the second time.

She died in Cacheu, likely from illness, not long after her return.

== Memorial ==
In 2016, the Memorial of slavery and the slave trade was inaugurated in Cacheu dedicated to the victims of slavery and the slave trade.
