= Marquis de Custine =

French aristocrat and writer (1790–1857)

Astolphe de Custine
- Marquis de Custine
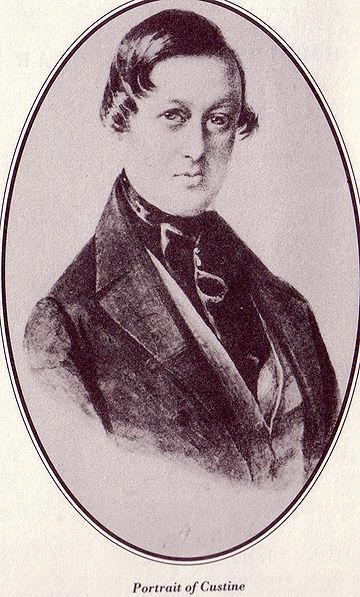
- Full name: Astolphe-Louis-Léonor
- Born: Astolphe-Louis-Léonor, Marquis de Custine; 18 March 1790; Niderviller, France
- Died: 25 September 1857 (Aged 67); Paris, France
- Buried: Chapelle d'Auquainville, Auquainville, Calvados, Lower Normandy, France
- Spouse: Léontine de Saint-Simon de Courtomer
- Issue: Enguerrand de Custine
- Father: Armand Renaud-Louis-Philippe-Francois, Marquis de Custine
- Mother: Delphine de Sabran

Astolphe-Louis-Léonor, Marquis de Custine (18 March 1790 – 25 September 1857) was a French aristocrat and writer who is best known for his travel writing, in particular his account of his visit to Russia, La Russie en 1839. This work documents not only Custine's travels through the Russian Empire, but also the social fabric, economy and way of life during the reign of Nicholas I. Due to this work, Custine was later dubbed by some historians as "the de Tocqueville of Russia".

== Biography ==
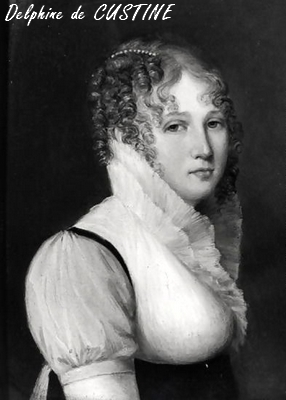
Delphine de Custine, his mother.

Astolphe de Custine was born in Niderviller, Lorraine. His family belonged to the French nobility and possessed the title marquis since the early 18th century. The paternal branch of the family also owned a famous faience factory. His mother, Delphine de Sabran, Marquise de Custine, came from the House of Sabran and was noted for her intelligence and great beauty.

Custine's father and grandfather, Adam Philippe, Comte de Custine, both sympathized with the French Revolution but were both guillotined. Custine's mother was imprisoned and barely escaped the same fate. In the aftermath of the overthrow of Robespierre and the end of the Reign of Terror, the friendship of the marchioness with Joseph Fouché (who would eventually become Minister of Police under Napoleon) allowed her to recover part of the family fortune. Custine and his mother resettled in Lorraine in 1795.

Under the direction of his strong-willed mother, Custine was raised in an chaotic yet stimulating social environment. This brought him into frequent contact with noted intellectuals, among them Germaine de Staël and François-René de Chateaubriand, considered the founder of Romanticism in French literature. The marchioness purchased the château of Fervaques, near Lisieux, in Normandy, from the Duc de Laval in October 1803; Chateaubriand noted his visits there between 1804 and 1806 in which he discussed with both the marchioness and Custine in Mémoires d'Outre-Tombe. Delphine died at Bex, in Vaud, Switzerland, on 13 July 1826.

Custine was given an excellent education and seemed to be headed towards a life in society. An income of 60,000 francs a year enabled him to live as he pleased. He owned an estate outside Paris, at Saint-Gratien, where on occasions he was visited by Frédéric Chopin. Custine spent time in the diplomatic service, attending the Congress of Vienna, and even accepted a military commission. Custine was at one time expected to marry Madame de Staël's daughter, Albertine, but refused the match. In 1821 Custine married Léontine de Saint-Simon de Courtomer, following the wishes of his mother. The Marquis, who would later admit his homosexuality and live openly with a male lover, was nevertheless genuinely fond of his wife. They had a son, Enguerrand. During the marriage Custine met and established a romantic relationship with an Englishman, Edward Saint-Barbe, who moved into the house with the couple, and remained his life companion. In 1823, during the early stages of a second pregnancy, Léontine fell ill and died, aged only twenty.

On 28 October 1824, Custine's life was irrevocably changed. That night, he was found unconscious in the mud outside of Paris, stripped to the waist, having been beaten and robbed. The attack had been carried out by a group of soldiers; with one of whom Custine allegedly had attempted to have a sexual encounter. However the exact reason for the attack was never proven. Nevertheless, news of the incident quickly spread around France — "From this time on to the end of his life Custine would figure, in the cruel gossip of the day, primarily as France's most distinguished and notorious homosexual." Even though the literary salons, as opposed to the society salons, remained open to Custine, many people who were friendly with him sneered at him behind his back. His diplomatic career was also cut short by this incident. A few years later in 1826, several family friends would die, as well as Enguerrand, Custine's four-year-old son by his late wife, and his mother.

In the years after these tragedies, Custine became very pious.

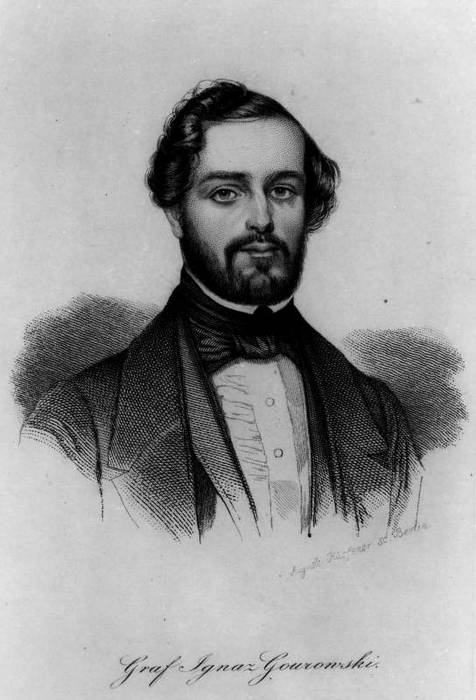
Ignacy Gurowski

Custine gravitated toward the Romantic movement and spent the next few years writing poetry and novels. Custine wrote one play and purchased a theater to produce it, but the play closed after three performances. None of his literary works received much attention. Heinrich Heine called Custine "un demi-homme des lettres" (a half-man of letters).

In 1835, an extremely attractive Polish count, the 23-year-old Ignatius Gurowski (1812–1887), moved into Custine and Saint-Barbe's home in the rue de La Rochefoucauld to form a ménage à trois. Wrote Custine: "He has an excellent heart, an original mind, is graciously ignorant of everything, and what settles it all, a charming bearing and countenance." The capricious Gurowski was not an easy guest, running up debts and seducing both men and women, but appears to have amused the couple. The detailed register of homosexuals, then maintained by the Paris police prefecture, and which termed Custine's inclinations 'frantic', wrote of Gurowski with a comical note of possible despair: "It is hereditary in his family: his father and grandfather were of the same religion." In 1841 Gurowski married a Spanish infanta, Isabella Ferdinanda de Bourbon.

== La Russie en 1839 ==
Custine eventually discovered that his knack was for travel writing. He wrote a decently received account of a trip to Spain and was encouraged by Honoré de Balzac to write accounts of other "half-European" parts of Europe, like southern Italy and Russia. In the late 1830s, Alexis de Tocqueville's Democracy in America appeared, whose last chapter contained the prophecy that the future belonged to Russia and America. Inspired by Tocqueville's work, Custine decided that Russia would be the subject of his next writing effort. Custine was later dubbed by some historians as "the de Tocqueville of Russia".

Custine visited Russia in 1839, spending most of his time in St. Petersburg, but also visiting Moscow and Yaroslavl. A political reactionary in his own country, fearful that democracy would inevitably lead to mob rule, he went to Russia looking for arguments against representative government, but he was appalled by autocracy as practiced in Russia and equally by the Russian people's apparent collaboration in their own oppression. He attributed this state of affairs to what he saw as the backwardness of the Russian Orthodox Church, combined with the disastrous effects of the Mongol invasion of medieval Russia, and the policies of Peter the Great.

Most of Custine's mockery was reserved for the Russian nobility and Nicholas I. Custine said that Russia's aristocracy had "just enough of the gloss of European civilization to be 'spoiled as savages' but not enough to become cultivated men. They were like 'trained bears who made you long for the wild ones.'" Custine criticized Tsar Nicholas for the constant spying he ordered and for repressing Poland (see November Uprising). Custine had more than one conversation with the Tsar and concluded it was possible that the Tsar behaved as he did only because he felt he had to. "If the Emperor has no more of mercy in his heart than he reveals in his policies, then I pity Russia; if, on the other hand, his true sentiments are really superior to his acts, then I pity the Emperor" (Kennan 76).

According to Kennan, Custine saw Russia as a horrible domain of obsequious flattery of the Tsar and spying. Custine said the air felt freer the moment one crossed into Prussia. In the mid-20th century, many commentators drew parallels between Custine's description of Russia and contemporary Soviet Union as well as noticing many similarities between his character outline of Nicholas I and Joseph Stalin.

=== Publication and reaction ===
La Russie en 1839, first published in full in 1843, went through six printings and was widely read in England, France, and Germany but banned in Russia, where it was not published in an unabridged version until 1996. Nonetheless, several Russian authors published works critical of it. Tsarist authorities also sponsored a more scholarly investigation of Russia by a foreigner, August von Haxthausen, who authored the Studies on the Interior of Russia. This work can be interpreted as an attempt to provide an objective research of Russia's traditional social institutions, which the Tsar's advisors believed would effectively counter Custine's work. The Tsar also commissioned the French writer Hippolyte Auger to pen an extensive refutation. However, as the scandal of Custine's work had subsided by then, the Tsar decided it was best not to remind the public of the book, and the project was abandoned.

== Death ==
Custine died of a stroke in the evening of 25 September 1857.

== Legacy ==
Custine's observations in La Russie en 1839 continue to be admired for their insight, prescience and sheer entertainment value, but are also disliked by others for reasons that can include the belief they are inaccurate, pretentious, racist, and that the idea of national stereotypes is an absurdity. It has been suggested that he is one of the originators of a putative West European Russophobia.

However, as one critic has written, what is indisputable is that "Above all, the Marquis valued freedom; freedom from fear, hypocrisy and the shackles that restrain the human spirit."

== In popular culture ==
Sergey Dreyden stars as a character representing Custine in the 2002 film Russian Ark. His conversations with the time-travelling narrator are intended to reflect Russia's continued struggle to search for its own identity and define its relations vis-à-vis Europe.
