= Édouard Auguste Nousveaux =

French painter

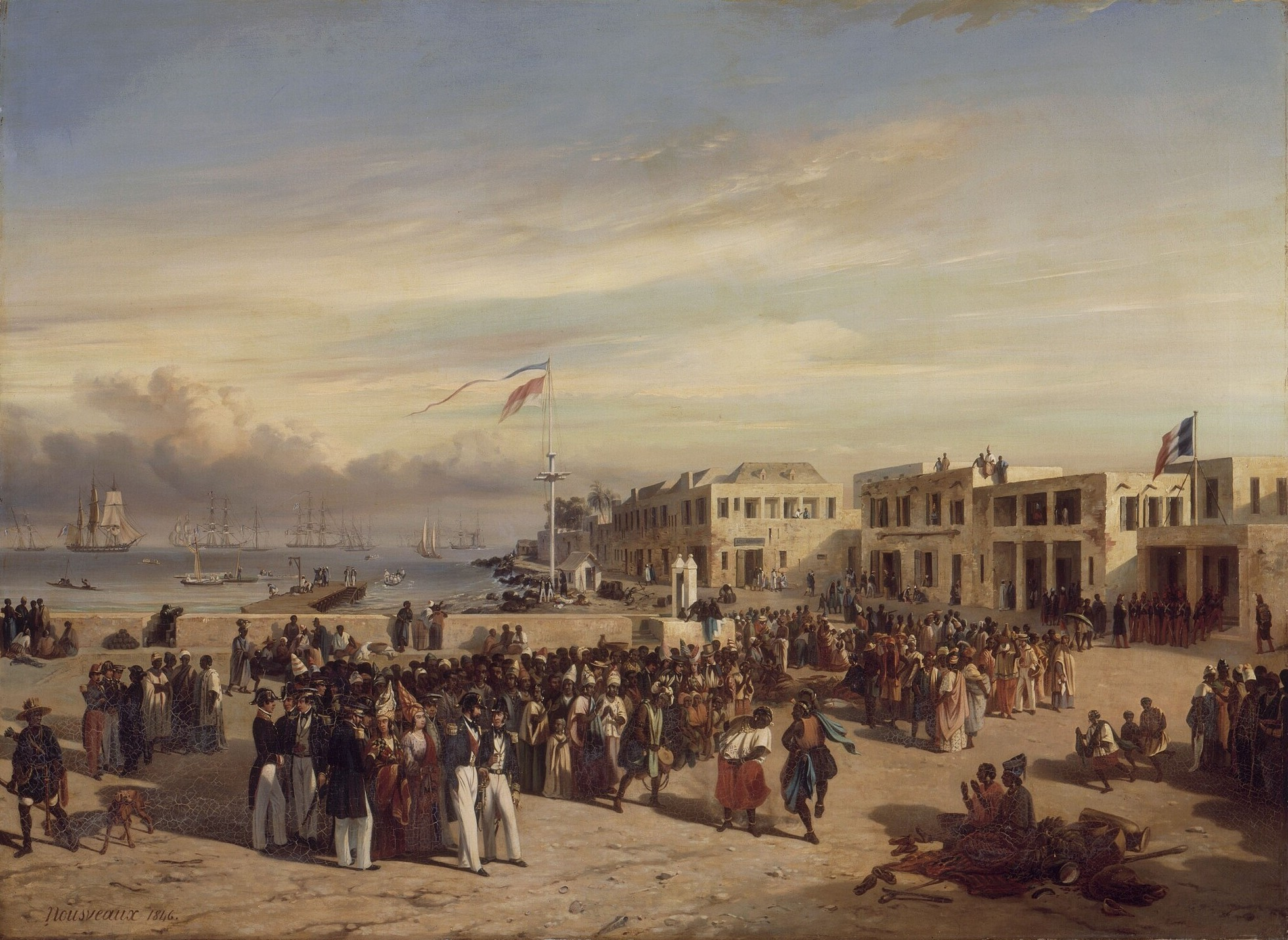
The Prince of Joinville on the Isle of Gorée

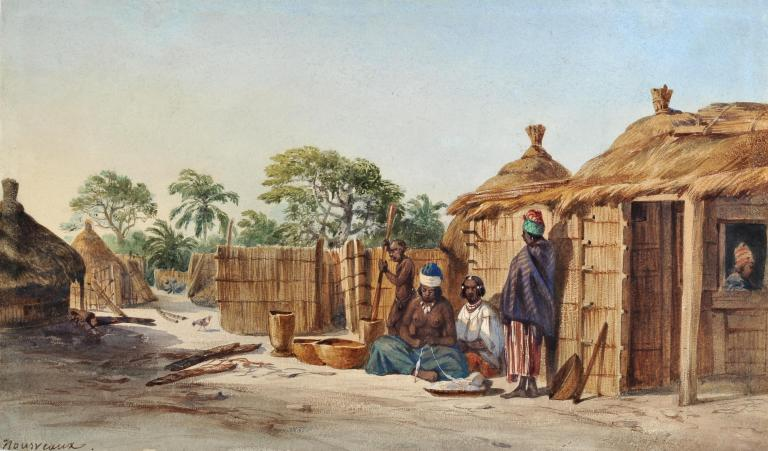
A Village Near Dakar

Édouard Auguste Nousveaux (4 September 1811, Paris – 1867, Paris) was a French landscape painter and watercolorist. He is best known for the works he created after participating in an expedition to Senegal; many of which were used in books and travel magazines.

== Biography ==
He obtained his artistic education at the École Nationale Supérieure des Beaux-Arts. In 1831, barely aged twenty. he held his first showing at the Salon.

In 1842, the artist Stanislas Darondeau died of an illness contracted in Senegal, after returning from an exploratory expedition there with Governor Édouard Bouët-Willaumez. Nousveaux, then aged thirty-one, was chosen to replace him; having already displayed an affinity for exotic themes. Upon his return in 1845, he exhibited nine watercolors at the Salon. They received mixed reviews. He was named a Knight in the Legion of Honor in 1847.

He would continue to make use of the sketches he executed in Senegal for several more years. In 1850, he turned to making lithographs of Paris, which were poorly received and criticized for being inaccurate or anachronistic. After this, there are few traces of any significant artistic production, although he did some collaborative work with Le Magasin pittoresque and L'Illustration.

He continued to travel, and died after returning from a military expedition.

In 1890, Colonel Henri-Nicolas Frey used some of Nousveaux' watercolors to illustrate his book, Côte occidentale d'Afrique : vues, scènes, croquis. Many publishers used his works without crediting them.
