= Stanislas de Boufflers =

French statesman and writer (1738–1815)

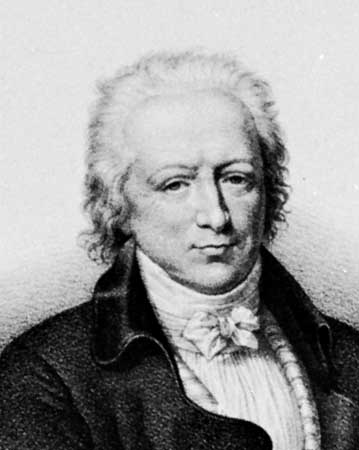
Stanislas de Boufflers

Stanislas Jean, chevalier de Boufflers (31 May 1738, Nancy – 18 January 1815) was a French statesman and writer.

== Biography ==
He was born near Nancy, Meurthe-et-Moselle, the son of Louis François, marquis de Boufflers. His mother, Marie Catherine de Beauveau Craon, was the mistress of Stanislas Leszczynski, and the boy was brought up at the court of Lunéville. He spent six months in study for the priesthood at Saint Sulpice, Paris, and during his residence there he circulated a story which became extremely popular, Aline, reine de Golconde.

Boufflers did not take priestly vows, as his ambitions were military. He entered the order of the Knights of Malta so that he could follow the career of arms without sacrificing the revenues of a benefice he had received in Lorraine from King Stanislas. After serving in various campaigns he reached the grade of maréchal de camp in 1784, and in the next year was sent to West Africa as governor of Senegal. During his time in Senegal, he had a relationship with Anne Pépin, which has become famous. He proved an excellent administrator, and attempted to mitigate the horrors of the slave trade; and he tried to open up the material resources of the colony so that his departure in 1787 was regarded as a real calamity by both colonists and Senegalese. On his return to France, he presented queen Marie Antoinette with an enslaved boy, Jean Amilcar, who became her foster child.

The Mémoires secrets of Louis Petit de Bachaumont suggest that Boufflers was sent to Senegal because he was in disgrace at court; but the real reason appears to have been a desire to pay his debts before his marriage with Mme de Sabran, which took place soon after his return to France. Boufflers was admitted to the Académie française in 1788, and subsequently became a member of the states-general. In 1789, he was elected a foreign member of the Royal Swedish Academy of Sciences. During the French Revolution he took refuge with Prince Henry of Prussia.

At the Restoration, he was made joint-librarian of the Bibliothèque Mazarine. His wit and his skill in light verse had won him a great reputation, and he was one of the idols of the Parisian salons. His paradoxical character was described in an epigram attributed to Antoine de Rivarol, "abbé libertin, militaire philosophe, diplomate chansonnier, émigré patriote, républicain courtisan."

== Works ==
Boufflers' Œuvres completes (complete works) were published under his own supervision in 1803. A selection of his stories in prose and verse was edited by Eugène Asse in 1878; his Poèsies by Octave Uzanne in 1886; and the Correspondence inédite de la comtesse de Sabran et du chevalier de Boufflers (1778-1788), by E de Magnieu and Henri Prat in 1875.
