= Dakar–Gorée Swim =

Swimming event

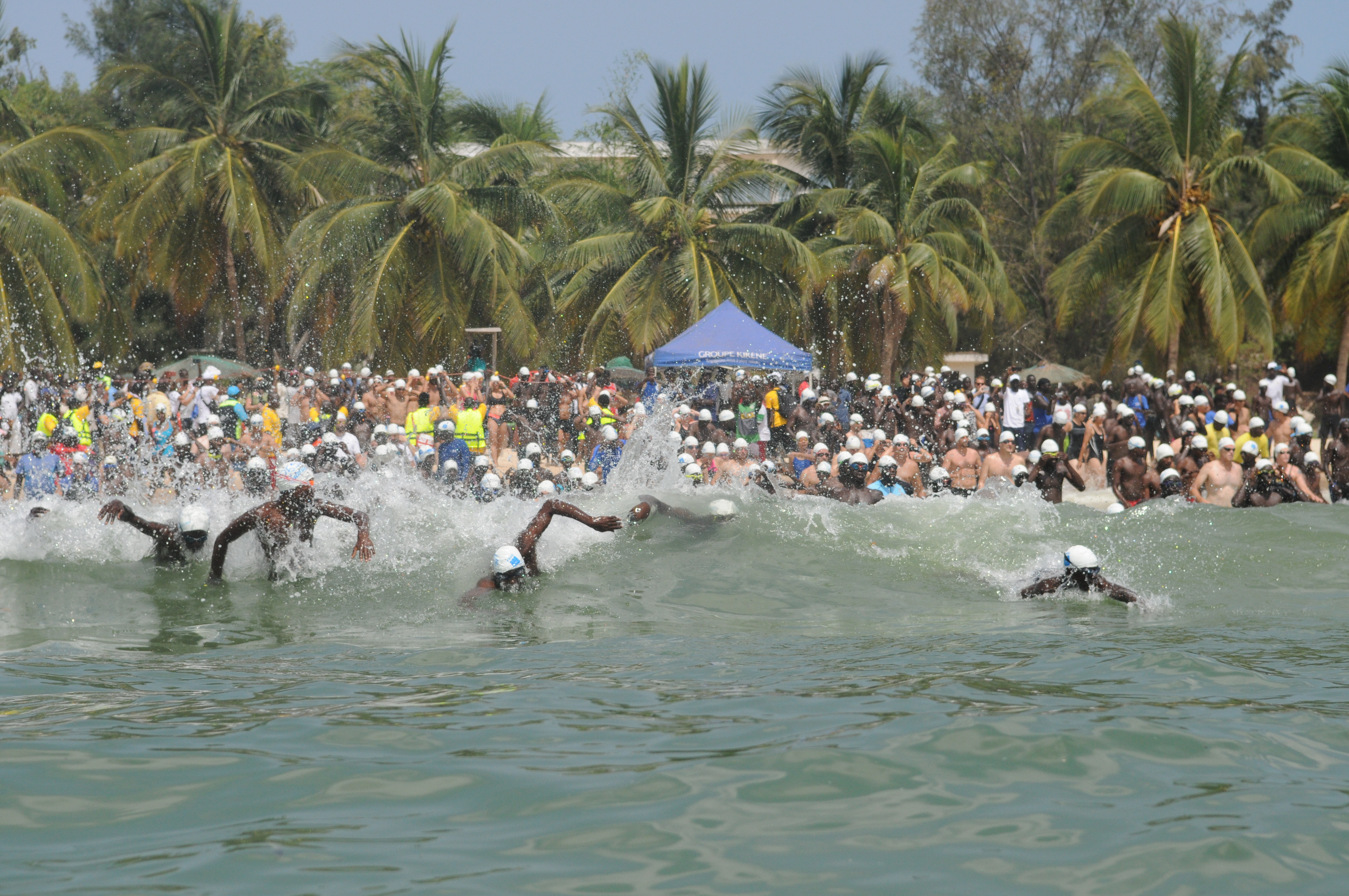
Start of the 31st edition of the Dakar-Gorée crossing

The Dakar–Gorée Swim also known as the Dakar–Gorée Crossing (French: Traversée Dakar-Gorée) is an annual open water swimming race event between the beach of Dakar and Gorée island, first held in 1985. The competition is split into a 4500 m race for amateurs and a 5200 m course. The 2020 edition was cancelled due to the COVID-19 epidemic. This sporting event is very popular in Senegal and is unique in West Africa.

== History ==
The Dakar–Gorée crossing was launched in 1985 as a homage to the victims of slavery who displayed resilience by attempting to swim, often in chains, towards freedom. Gorée Island is a place symbolic of the memory of the slave trade in Africa, and is listed as a UNESCO World Heritage Site.

The idea for the crossing came from a group of young swimmers, mostly from Gorée, who wanted to celebrate Saint Charles, patron saint of Gorée, by challenging each other to a race between Dakar and Gorée Island. Among them, Samba Ndoye, Ibra Kare, Hachim Badji, Mbaye Ndiaye, Mohamed Diop, and Karim Thioune would go on to become important figures in Senegalese sport. The first edition of the swim took place on October 15, 1985, during the International Youth Year. Around thirty participants set off from the harbor of the Autonomous Port of Dakar for this inaugural edition, covering a distance of 3500 m.

Since 2001, the Senegalese Swimming and Lifesaving Federation decided to adhere to the standards of the International Swimming Federation (FINA), increasing the distance of the Dakar-Gorée crossing to 5000 m, starting from the Voile d'Or beach in Dakar.

In 2004, the competition saw over 600 participants, both men and women, Senegalese and foreigners.

It was in 2008 that the Senegalese Swimming and Lifesaving Federation decided to organize two starts: race A (7800 m), starting from Thiaroye, and race B (4500 m) with the starting point at the Voile d'Or beach. The 2008 innovation has been maintained since then, but both races now start from the same location (Voile d'Or), with a change in distance for race A, which now covers 5200 m.

In 2012, the 4500 m race for amateurs saw the participation of 410 individuals, while the race for experienced swimmers, licensed club members, covering 7800 m, was contested by 66 individuals, according to the organizers.

It has been a recurring event throughout its history, except in 2020 and 2021 when it was cancelled due to the COVID-19 pandemic.

== Description ==
As of 2023, two race categories are held during the event: Race A, which spans 5,200 meters and is attended by professional swimmers starting from Voile d'Or; and Race B, designed for amateurs, which in 2023 saw participation from around 400 swimmers.

== Winners ==
=== Men's competition ===
Men's competition
Date	Swimmer	Club
1985	Hachim Badji	ASC Diaraf
1986	Mohamed Diop	ASC Diaraf
1987	Samba Ndoye	ASFA
1988	Samba Ndoye	ASFA
1989	Samba Ndoye	ASFA
1993	Abdoulaye Thiaw	Olympique de Ngor
1994	Samba Ndoye	ASFA
1995	Samba Ndoye	ASFA
1996	Mangoné Samba	ASFA
1997	Samba Ndoye	ASFA
1998	Samba Ndoye	ASFA
1999	Malick Fall	ETICS de Mboro
2000	Malick Fall	ETICS de Mboro
2001	Malick Fall	ETICS de Mboro
2002	Malick Fall	ETICS de Mboro
2003	Benjamin Mathieu	RC France
2004	Mangoné Samba	ASFA
2005	Guy Noël Smith	CN Cannes
2006	Mazen Aziz	EGY
2007	Mangoné Samba	ASFA
2008	Matar Samb	Olympique de Ngor
2009	Malick Fall	SFOC
2010	Matar Samb	Olympique de Ngor
2011	Abdoul Niane	BCEAO
2012	Abdoul Niane	BCEAO
2013	Adama Thiaw Ndir	ASFA
2014	Malick Fall	SFOC
2015	Mamadou Ndoye Diop	RS Yoff
2016	Adama Thiaw Ndir	AOC
2017	Amadou Ndiaye	SM Montrouge
2018	Adama Thiaw Ndir	ASFA
2019	Adama Thiaw Ndir	ASFA
2020	Cancelled due to the COVID-19 pandemic	
2021	Cancelled due to the COVID-19 pandemic	
2022	Ousseynou Diop	ASFA
2023	Ousseynou Diop	ASFA

=== Women's competition ===
Women's competition
Date	Swimmer	Club
1986	Khoudia Kamara	US Gorée
1987	Marième Soda Camara	US Gorée
1988	Marième Soda Camara	US Gorée
1989	Marième Soda Camara	US Gorée
1993	Marième Soda Camara	US Gorée
1994	Alexandra Roucher	CN Dakar
1995	Zeïna Saheli	CN Dakar
1996	Zeïna Saheli	CN Dakar
1997	Zeïna Saheli	CN Dakar
1998	Marième Soda Camara	US Gorée
1999	Zeïna Saheli	CN Dakar
2000	Zeïna Saheli	CN Dakar
2001	Maty Beye	ETICS de Mboro
2002	Zeïna Saheli	CN Dakar
2003	Jessica Sylla	CN Dakar
2004	Jessica Sylla	CN Dakar
2005	Khadija Ciss	CN Cannes
2006	Louise Smyth	RSA
2007	Binta Zahra Diop	CN Dakar
2008	Oulèye Diallo	BCEAO
2009	Yaye Diadou Diagne	Olympique de Ngor
2010	Yaye Diadou Diagne	Olympique de Ngor
2011	Yaye Diadou Diagne	Olympique de Ngor
2012	Yaye Diadou Diagne	Olympique de Ngor
2013	Meredith Anne Staken	CNDG
2014	Meredith Anne Staken	CNDG
2015	Jeanne Boutbien	BCEAO
2016	Jeanne Boutbien	AOC
2017	Ndèye Tabara Diagne	BCEAO
2018	Ndèye Tabara Diagne	AOC
2019	Ndèye Tabara Diagne	AOC
2020	Cancelled due to the COVID-19 pandemic	
2021	Cancelled due to the COVID-19 pandemic	
2022	Mariama Dramé	CNRAM
2023	Aïssatou Ndiaye	CNRAM
