= Gorée =

Island and district of Dakar, Senegal

Gorée Sor
- Commune d'arrondissement
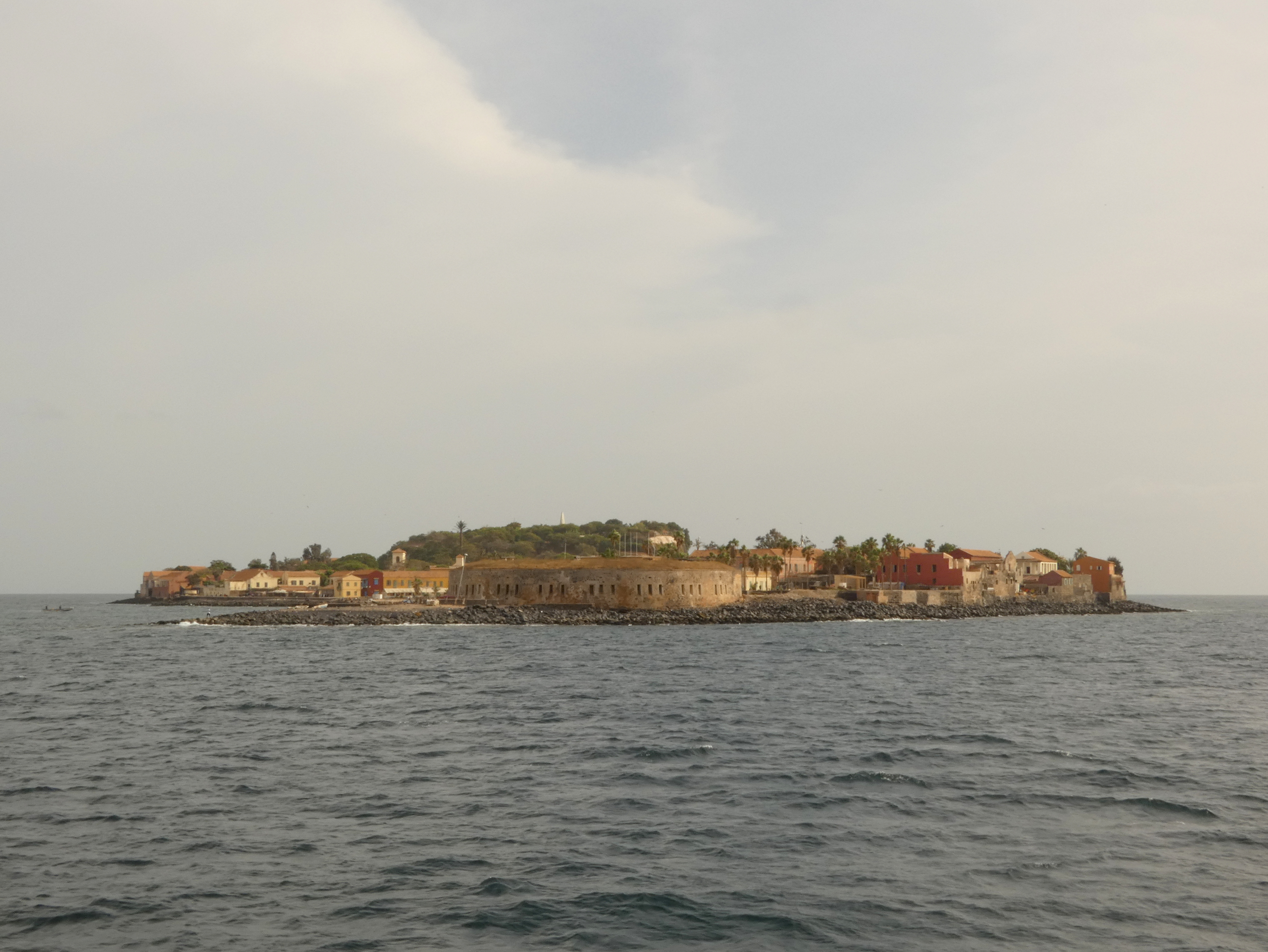
- View of the island

- Gorée location
- Country: Senegal
- Region: Dakar Region
- Department: Dakar Department

Area
  - Total: 0.28 km^{2} (0.11 sq mi)

Population (2018)
  - Total: 1,800
  - Density: 6,400/km^{2} (17,000/sq mi)
- Time zone: UTC+0 (GMT)
- Location within Senegal

UNESCO World Heritage Site
- Official name: Island of Gorée
- Criteria: Cultural: (vi)
- Reference: 26
- Inscription: 1978 (2nd Session)
- Coordinates: 14°40′01″N 17°23′54″W

Île de Gorée (French pronunciation: [ildəɡoʁe]; "Gorée Island"; Wolof: Beer Dun) is one of the 19 communes d'arrondissement (i.e., districts) of the city of Dakar, Senegal. It is an 18.2-hectare (45-acre) island located two kilometres (1.1 nmi; 1.2 mi) at sea from the main harbour of Dakar (14°40′N 17°24′W), famous as a destination for people interested in the Atlantic slave trade.

Its population as of the 2013 census was 1,680 inhabitants, giving a density of 5,802 inhabitants per square kilometre (15,030/sq mi), which is only half the average density of the city of Dakar. Gorée is both the smallest and the least populated of the 19 communes d'arrondissement of Dakar.

Other important centres for the slave trade from Senegal were further north, at Saint-Louis, Senegal, or to the south in the Gambia, at the mouths of major rivers for trade. It is a UNESCO World Heritage Site and was one of the first 12 locations in the world to be designated as such in 1978.

The name is a corruption of its original Dutch name Goeree, named after the Dutch island of Goeree. The island was also known as Palma, or Bezeguiche in Portuguese.

== History and slave trade ==
Historical affiliations

Portugal 1444–1588
Dutch Republic 1588
Portugal 1588–1621
West India Company 1621–1663
England 1663–1664
West India Company 1664–1677
France 1677–1758
Great Britain 1758–1763
France 1763–1779
Great Britain 1779–1783
France 1783–1801
Great Britain 1801–1804
France 1804
Great Britain 1804–1815
France 1815–1960
Senegal 1960–present

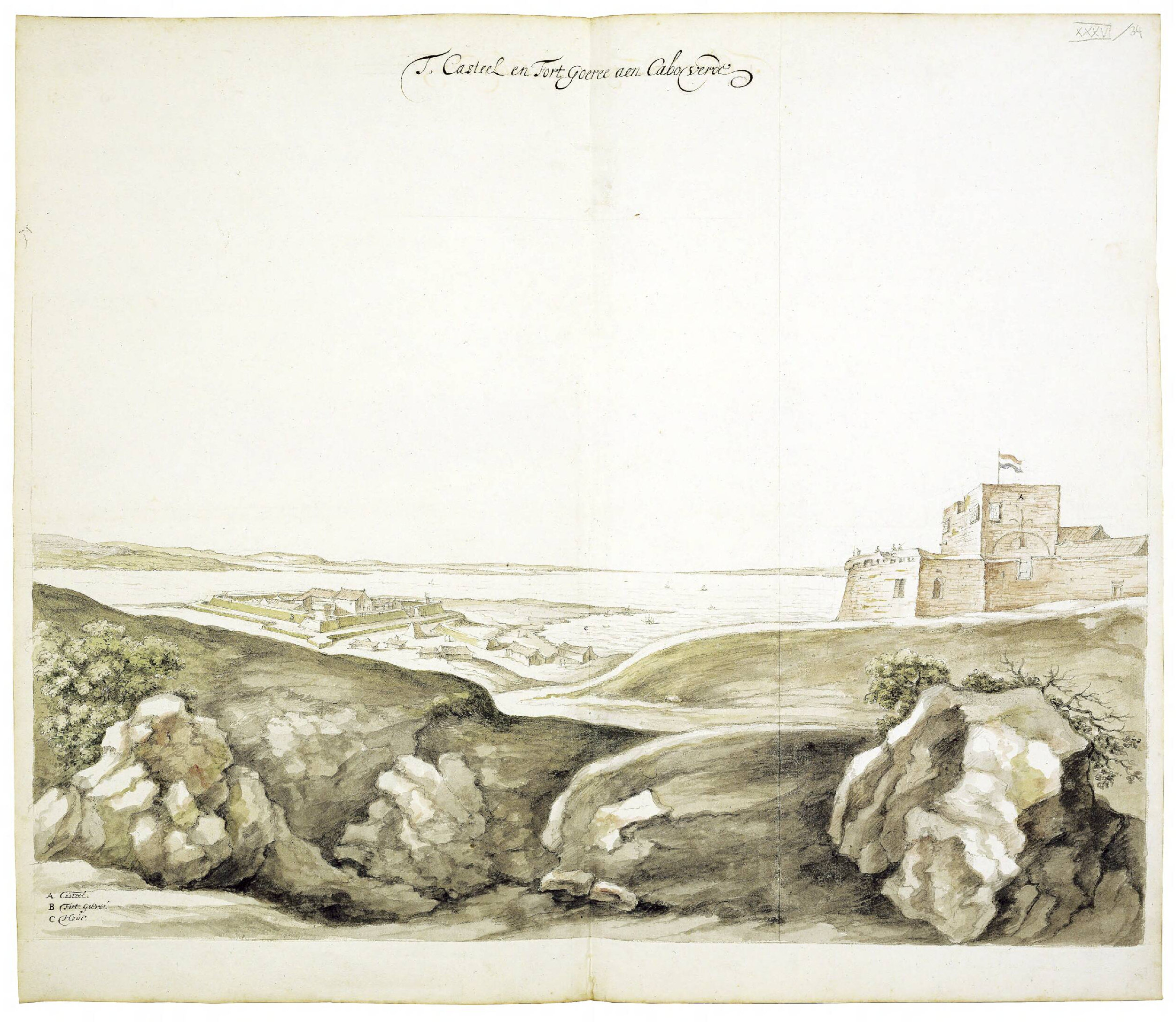
Drawing of the castle, fort and harbor of Gorée from the Atlas Blaeu-Van der Hem.

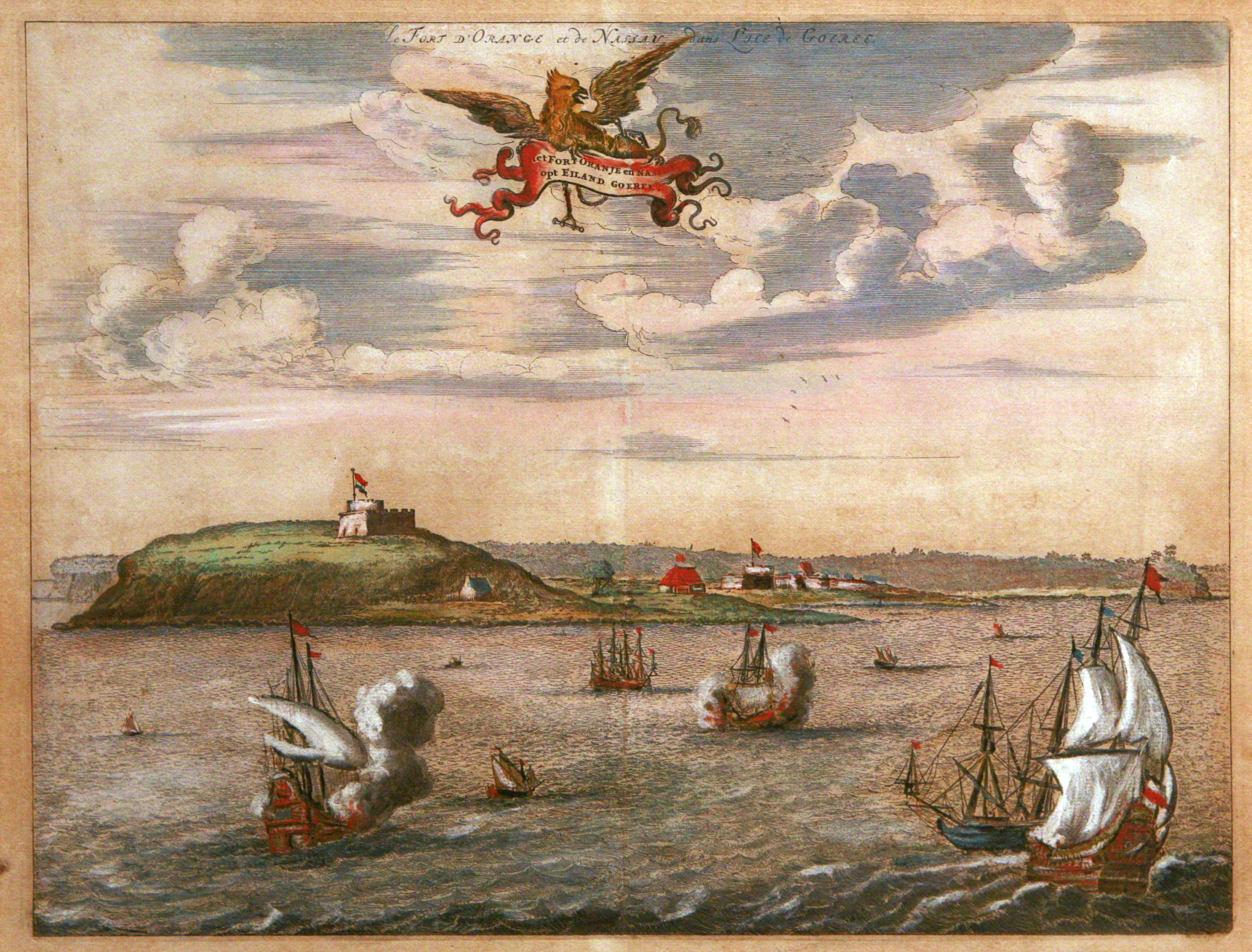
The Dutch established the forts of Nassau (1628) and Orange (1639). Coloured engraving, Holland, 17th century

Gorée is a small island 900 metres (3,000 ft) in length and 350 metres (1,150 ft) in width sheltered by the Cap-Vert Peninsula. Now part of the city of Dakar, it was a minor port and site of European settlement along the coast.

Being almost devoid of drinking water, the island was not settled before the arrival of Europeans, although the presence of domesticated sheep noted by Portuguese explorers indicates the island was frequented by local peoples of the nearby mainland. The island of Gorée was one of the first places in Africa to be frequented by European traders, as the Portuguese traders established themselves on the island in 1444. According to Valentim Fernandes, the Portuguese established a chapel with dry stone walls and a roof made out of straw on the island. This chapel was visited by Vasco da Gama in 1502 and probably also by Amerigo Vespucci, Tristão da Cunha and Afonso de Albuquerque in 1501 and 1506, respectively.

=== Dutch West India Company rule ===
Due to the destruction of much of the archive of the First Dutch West India Company, it is unknown when and how the Dutch replaced the Portuguese on the island. According to Olfert Dapper, the island was gifted to the Dutch West India Company by the local chief Biram in 1617. This statement is problematic, not the least because the Dutch West India Company was only established in 1621. The first contemporary Dutch account of a landing at Gorée is by Johannes de Laet, who reported that a fleet of Dirck Symonsz van Uytgeest destined for Brazil anchored at Gorée on 20 July 1628. De Laet mentions that the Dutch West India Company had built a fort on the island and had named the island Goeree. This could either be after the Dutch island of Goeree or, as is the case for the Dutch island itself, be an allusion to the quality of the anchorage at the island, as goede reede means "good roadstead" in Dutch.

Possession of Goree was the key to accessing the trade of the entire coast south of the Cap Vert, including the important trading posts at Rufisque, Saly-Portudal, Joal, and Cacheu, in addition to the commerce of the Gambia River, as it served as a warehousing and transshipment point. In addition, it was a convenient stopover on the shortest route from Europe to the Caribbean. Many slaves were shipped through Goree to the Dutch colony of Curaçao in the 1660s and 70s.

The island was attacked by the Portuguese in early 1629, but they were not able to hold it. With this loss, their access to the lucrative coastal trade was cut off, and the importance and wealth of Santiago, Cape Verde, withered. The British also attempted to control this trade, capturing the island with a fleet under Robert Holmes in 1663, but it was soon recaptured by Michiel de Ruyter. Repeated wars weakened the Dutch West India Company, however, and the Third Anglo-Dutch War precipitated the bankruptcy of the company in 1674. In 1677 a French fleet led by Jean d'Estrées defeated the Dutch and captured Goree and their coastal trading posts.

=== French colonial rule ===
After the French invasion in 1677, during the Franco-Dutch War, the island remained chiefly French until 1960. There were brief periods of British occupation during the various wars fought by France and Britain. The island was notably taken and occupied by the British between 1758 and 1763 following the Capture of Gorée and wider Capture of Senegal during the Seven Years' War before being returned to France at the Treaty of Paris (1763). For a brief time between 1779 and 1783, Gorée was again under British control, until ceded again to France in 1783 at the Treaty of Paris (1783). During that time, the infamous Joseph Wall served as Lieutenant-Governor there, who had some of his men unlawfully flogged to death in 1782; for these crimes, Wall was later executed in England.

Gorée was principally a trading post, administratively attached to Saint-Louis, capital of the Colony of Senegal. Apart from slaves, beeswax, hides and grain were also traded. The population of the island fluctuated according to circumstances, from a few hundred free Africans and Creoles to about 1,500. There would have been few European residents at any one time.

After the decline of the slave trade from Senegal in the 1770s and 1780s, the town became an important port for the shipment of peanuts, peanut oil, gum arabic, ivory, and other products of the "legitimate" trade. It was probably in relation to this trade that the so-called Maison des Esclaves was built.

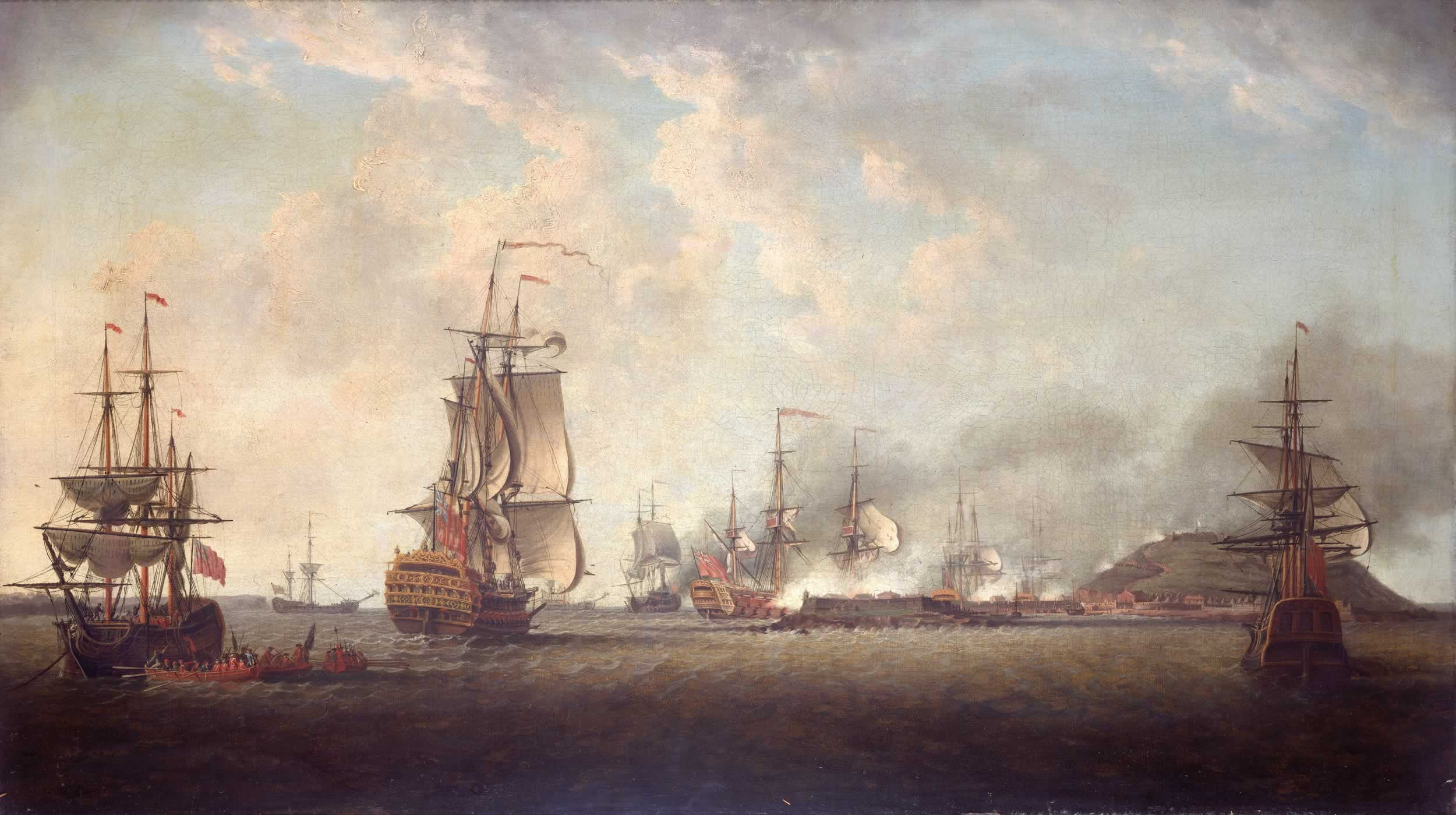
British capture of Gorée during the Seven Years' War, 29 December 1758

In the 18th and 19th century, Gorée was home to a Franco-African Creole, or Métis, community of merchants with links to similar communities in Saint-Louis and the Gambia, and across the Atlantic to France's colonies in the Americas. Métis women, called signares from the Portuguese senhora descendants of African women and European traders, were especially important to the city's business life. The signares owned ships and property and commanded male clerks. They were also famous for cultivating fashion and entertainment. One such signare, Anne Rossignol, lived in Saint-Domingue (the modern Haiti) in the 1780s before the Haitian Revolution.

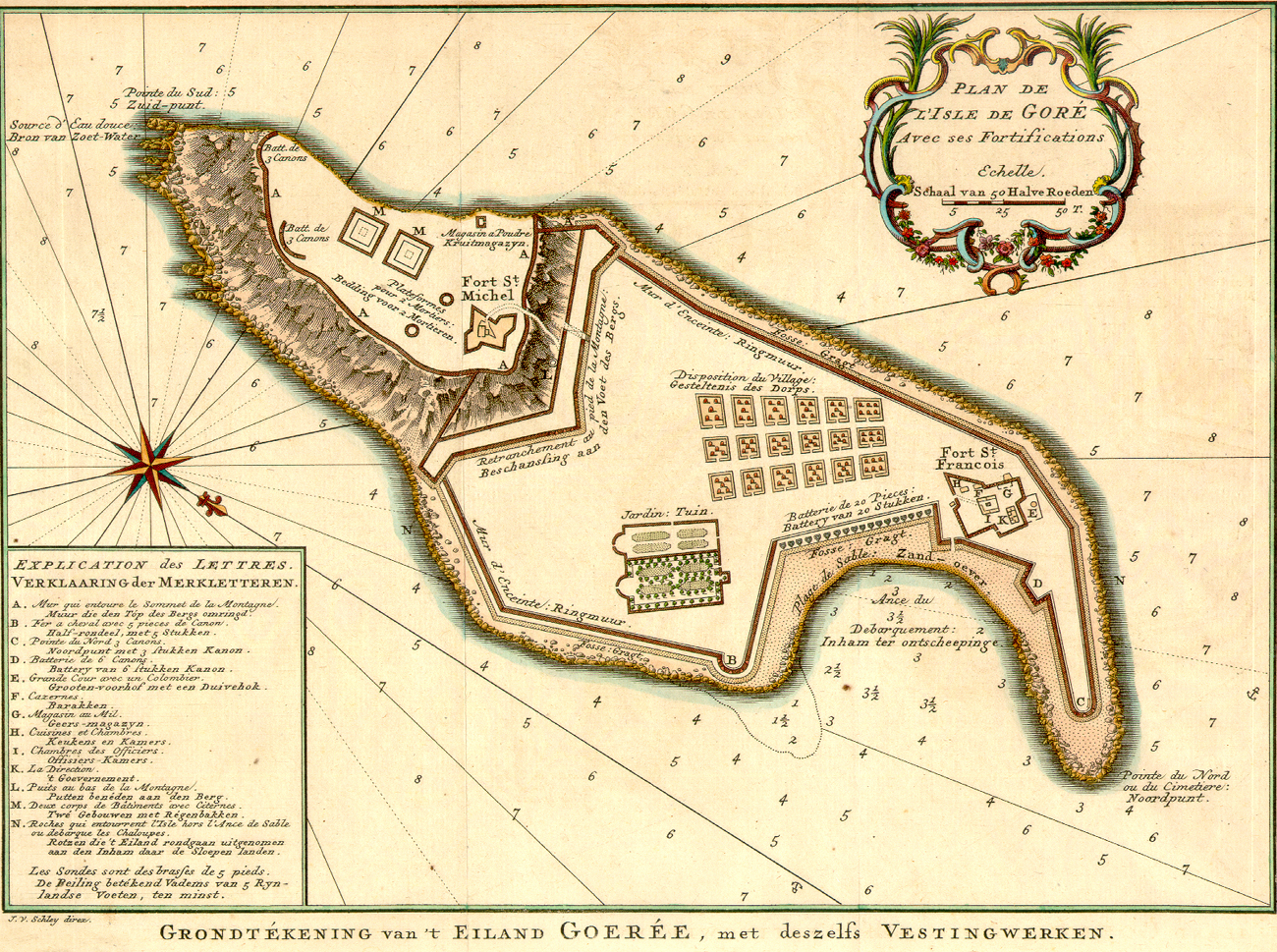
Schley, Jacobus van der, 1715–1779. Island of Gorée and its fortifications

In February 1794 during the French Revolution, France abolished slavery, and the slave trade from Senegal was said to have stopped. In April 1801, Gorée was captured by the British again.

In January 1804 a small French squadron from Curaçao captured Gorée, but the British recaptured it in March.

In March 1815, during his political comeback known as the Hundred Days, Napoleon definitively abolished the slave trade to build relations with Great Britain. This time, abolition continued.

As the trade in slaves declined in the late eighteenth century, Gorée converted to legitimate commerce. The tiny city and port were ill-situated for the shipment of industrial quantities of peanuts, which began arriving in bulk from the mainland. Consequently, its merchants established a presence directly on the mainland, first in Rufisque (1840) and then in Dakar (1857). Many of the established families started to leave the island.

Civic franchise for the citizens of Gorée was institutionalized in 1872, when it became a French commune with an elected mayor and a municipal council. Blaise Diagne, the first African deputy elected to the French National Assembly (served 1914 to 1934), was born on Gorée. From a peak of about 4,500 in 1845, the population fell to 1,500 in 1904. In 1940 Gorée was annexed to the municipality of Dakar.

From 1913 to 1938, Gorée was home to the École normale supérieure William Ponty, a government teachers' college run by the French Colonial Government. Many of the school's graduates would one day lead the struggle for independence from France. In 1925 African-American historian, sociologist, and Pan-Africanist W. E. B. Du Bois wrote of the school "On the picturesque island of Goree whose ancient ramparts face modern and commercial Dakar I saw two or three hundred fine black boys of high school rank gathered in from all Senegal by competitive tests and taught thoroughly by excellent French teachers in accordance with a curriculum which, as far as it went, was equal to that of any European school," while faulting Colonial France for how limited its public education infrastructure was in the country overall and expressing pessimism about further investment.

=== Post-independence ===
Gorée is connected to the mainland by regular 30-minute ferry service, for pedestrians only; there are no cars on the island. Senegal's premier tourist site, the island was listed as a UNESCO World Heritage Site in 1978. It now serves mostly as a memorial to the slave trade. Many of the historic commercial and residential buildings have been turned into restaurants and hotels to support the tourist traffic.

Gorée is known as the location of the House of Slaves (French: Maison des esclaves), built by an Afro-French Métis family about 1780–1784. The House of Slaves is one of the oldest houses on the island. It is now used as a tourist destination to show the horrors of the slave trade throughout the Atlantic world. As discussed by historian Ana Lucia Araujo, the building started gaining reputation as a slave depot mainly because of the work of its curator Boubacar Joseph Ndiaye, who was able to move the audiences who visited the house with his performance. Many public personalities visit the House of Slaves, which plays the role of a site of memory of slavery. In June 2013, President of the United States Barack Obama visited the building.

The Dakar-Gorée Swim was launched in 1985 as a homage to the victims of slavery who displayed resilience by attempting to swim towards freedom. It has been a recurring event throughout its history, except in 2020 and 2021 when it was cancelled due to the COVID-19 pandemic.

== Administration ==
Map of Gorée

With the foundation of Dakar in 1857, Gorée gradually lost its importance. In 1872, the French colonial authorities created the two communes of Saint-Louis and Gorée, the first western-style municipalities in West Africa, with the same status as any commune in France. Dakar, on the mainland, was part of the commune of Gorée, whose administration was located on the island. However, as early as 1887, Dakar was detached from the commune of Gorée and was turned into a commune in its own right. Thus, the commune of Gorée became limited to its tiny island.

In 1891, Gorée still had 2,100 inhabitants, while Dakar only had 8,737 inhabitants. However, by 1926 the population of Gorée had declined to only 700 inhabitants, while the population of Dakar had increased to 33,679 inhabitants. Thus, in 1929 the commune of Gorée was merged with Dakar. The commune of Gorée disappeared, and Gorée was now only a small island of the commune of Dakar.

In 1996, a massive reform of the administrative and political divisions of Senegal was voted by the Parliament of Senegal. The commune of Dakar, deemed too large and too populated to be properly managed by a central municipality, was divided into 19 communes d'arrondissement to which extensive powers were given. The commune of Dakar was maintained above these 19 communes d'arrondissement. It coordinates the activities of the communes d'arrondissement, much as Greater London coordinates the activities of the London boroughs.

Thus, in 1996 the commune of Gorée was resurrected, although it is now only a commune d'arrondissement (but in fact with powers quite similar to a commune). The new commune d'arrondissement of Gorée (officially, the Commune d'Arrondissement de l'île de Gorée) took possession of the old mairie (town hall) in the center of the island. This had been used as the mairie of the former commune of Gorée between 1872 and 1929.

The commune d'arrondissement of Gorée is ruled by a municipal council (conseil municipal) democratically elected every 5 years, and by a mayor elected by members of the municipal council.

The current mayor of Gorée is Augustin Senghor, elected in 2002.

== Archaeology of Gorée Island ==
The island is a UNESCO World Heritage Site, since September 1978. Most of the main buildings in Gorée were constructed during the second half of the eighteenth century. The main buildings are the Slave house, 1786; William Ponty School, 1770; Musée de la mer (Maritime museum), 1835; Fort d'Estrées, originally called the northern battery, which now contains the Historical Museum of Senegal, built between 1852 and 1865; palais du Government (Government Palace), 1864, occupied by the first governor-general of Senegal from 1902 to 1907. The Gorée Castle and the seventeenth-century Gorée Police Station, formerly a dispensary, believed to be the site of the first chapel built by the Portuguese in the fifteenth century, and the beach are also of interest to tourists.

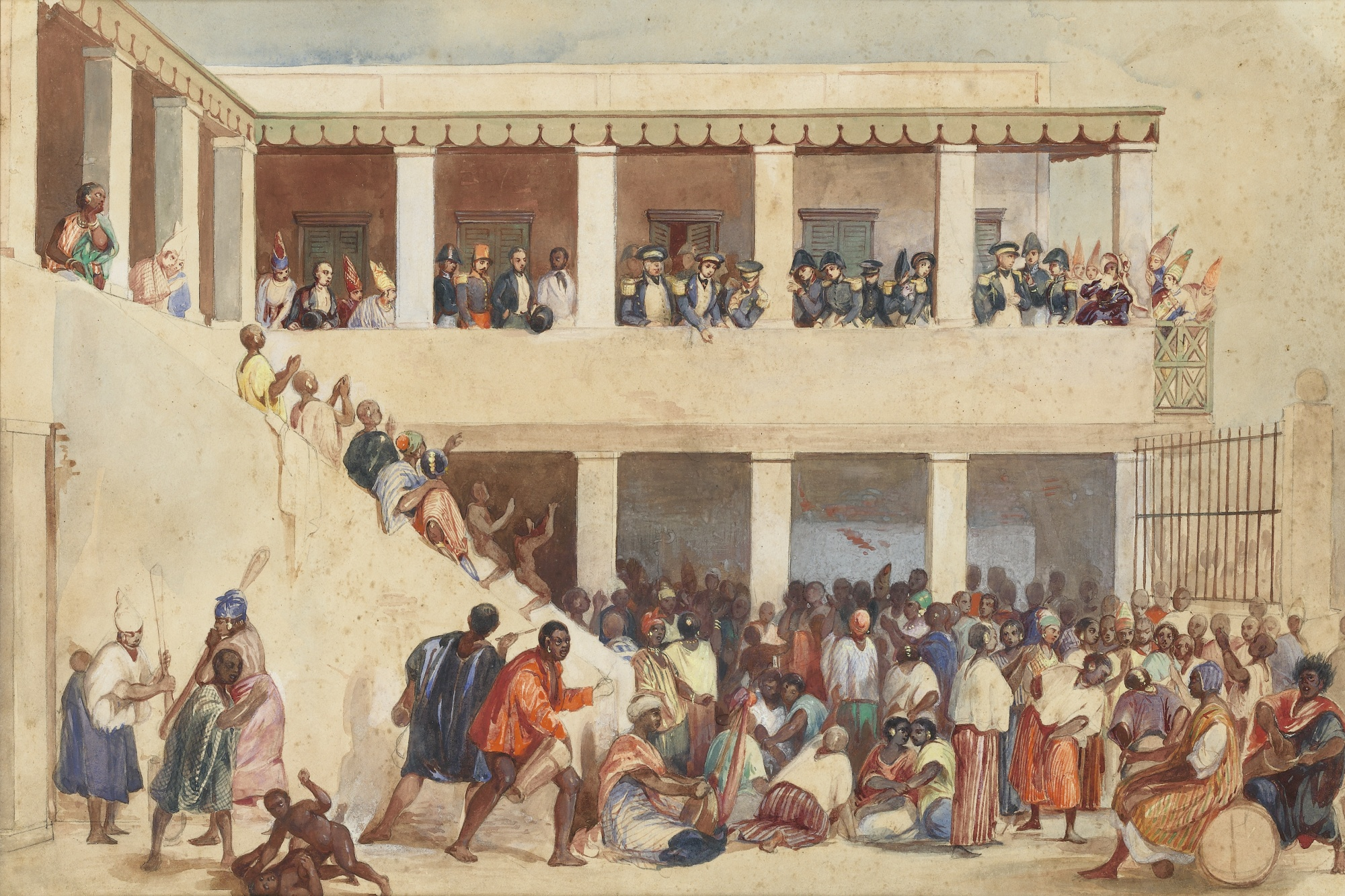
François d'Orléans – Tam-tam à Gorée (1837)

This historical site is a rare example of a European colony where we see free and enslaved Africans (making up half of Gorée's population), Europeans and Afro-Europeans living alongside each other, even as the island was a prominent center in the Atlantic slave trade. Archaeology on Gorée Island leads to many contradictory and contrasting conclusions. On one end of the spectrum, enslaved peoples on Gorée were treated poorly, like animals, on the other there is evidence for enslaved peoples being welcomed as part of families. The signares (free African or Afro-European women) were recorded preferring to eat on the floor with a spoon and communal bowl, as their domestic slaves, but European men kept tradition and used a table.

Archaeological research on Gorée has been undertaken by Dr Ibrahima Thiaw (Associate Professor of Archaeology at the Institut Fondamental d'Afrique Noire (IFAN); and the University Cheikh Anta Diop of Dakar, Senegal); Dr Susan Keech McIntosh (Professor of Archaeology, Rice University, Houston, Texas); and Raina Croff (PhD candidate at Yale University, New Haven, Connecticut). Dr Shawn Murray (University of Wisconsin–Madison) also contributed to archaeological research at Gorée through a study of local and introduced trees and shrubs, which aids in identifying the ancient plant remains found in the excavations. Excavations at Gorée have also uncovered numerous European imports: bricks, nails, bottles from alcoholic beverages such as wine, beer and other liquor, beads, ceramics and gunflints.

=== Gorée Archaeological Project ===
The Gorée Archaeological Project, or GAP, started its undertakings (survey, testing, mapping, and excavations) in 2001. The project, extending over a period of several years, aimed to collect artifacts pertaining to the historical time periods of the pre- and post- European settlement, as well as identify the use of the different quarters on the island using the material culture excavated from those areas. In his preliminary results, Ibrahima Thiaw also discusses the difficulties of excavation on a primarily tourist island.

=== Background ===
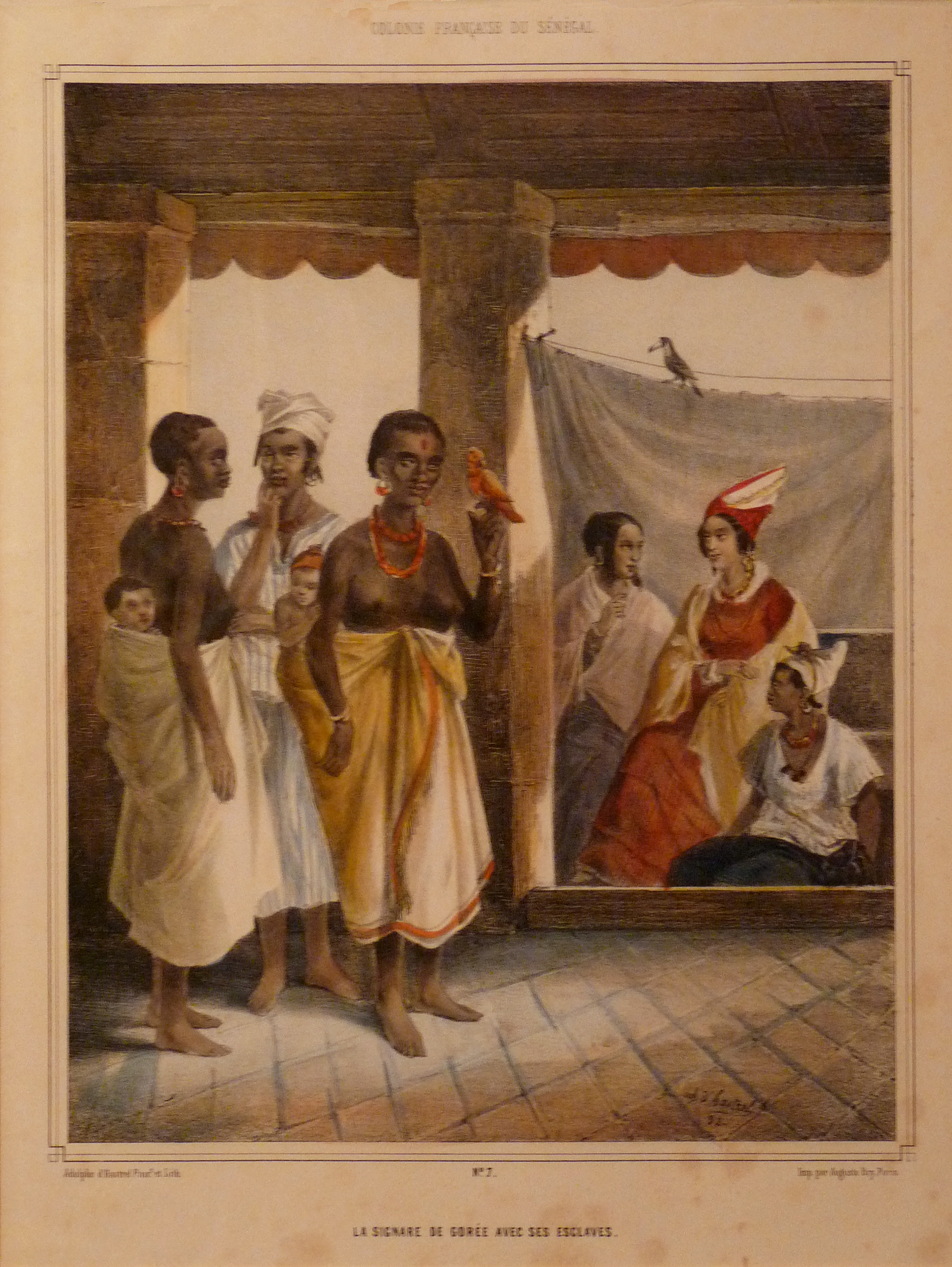
La Signare de Gorée avec ses esclaves (The signare of Gorée with her slaves), Musée de la Compagnie des Indes

Portuguese Major Captain Lançarote and his crew were the first to make Afro-European relations with Gorée Island in 1445. After sighting Gorée approximately three kilometres (1.9 miles) off the shore from modern day Dakar, Senegal, Lançarote and his officers sent ashore a few officers to leave peace offerings to the natives of the island. They deposited on Gorée soil a cake, a mirror and a piece of paper with a cross drawn on it, all of which were intended to be symbols for peaceful actions. However, the Africans did not respond in the desired way and tore up the paper and smashed the cake and the mirror, thus setting the tone for future relations between the Portuguese and Africans of Gorée Island.

As of the early 18th century, Gorée settlements were segregated into quarters: the Bambara quarter (slaves), gourmettes (Christianized Africans), and a quarter for the residents of Gorée, including free Africans. By the later half of the 18th century, the segregation was between signares and their families and the rest of the island as well as the previous instated quarters.

=== Pre-European settlement ===
According to preliminary results by Ibrahim Thiaw, the levels between the pre and post European contact deposits were characterized by an obvious infestation of termite nests. One interpretation of this is the possibility that these termite nests were cause of the abandonment of Gorée before Dutch arrival.

Deposits of the pre-European period are dense with pottery decorated with twine and fish vertebrae motifs and could be found in the domestic settlement context, under or at the same levels of floors and fireplaces. The pottery near the settlements suggests that these settlements were semi-permanent or permanent. Fishing tools and equipment were rare although deposits were dense with fish remains. There was also no sign of iron or its usage before the eighteenth century.

Due to a plethora of features containing ritual pots found in the core of the pre European settlement, Thiaw has concluded that the island may have been primarily used for ritual activity and practices. Nevertheless, abandonment is archaeologically evident by the middle of the fifteenth century, possibly due to a mighty termite invasion. There is no archaeological or physical evidence of a struggle or conflict between the eventual Europeans or any other cultural group. Thiaw's hypothesis suggest the possibility that when the Portuguese used the island to bury their dead, the island, in the eyes of the natives, became haunted or was negatively impacted by the mysterious powers of the spirits of the sea.

=== European settlement ===
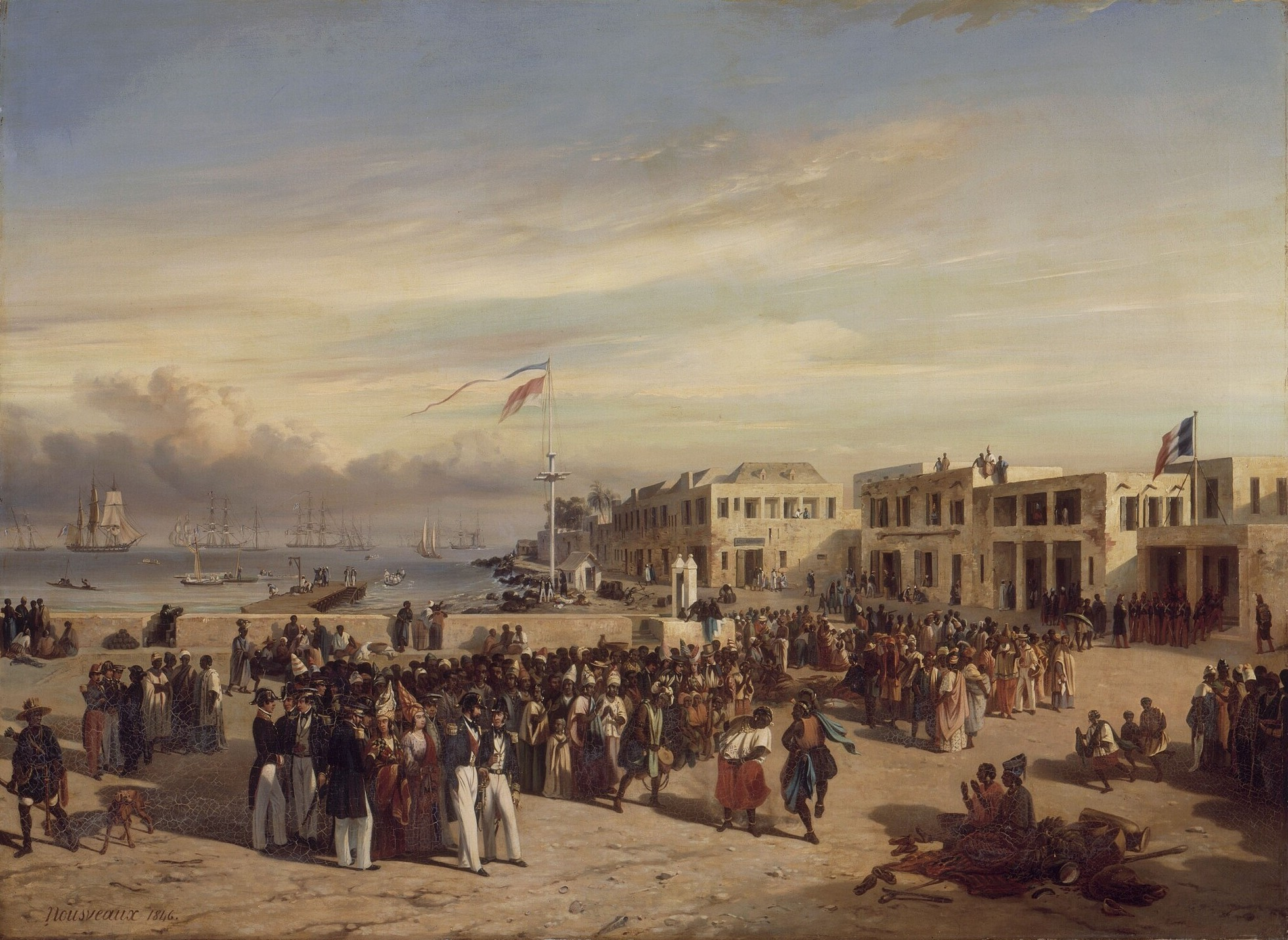
Artist representation of Gorée in 1842

There is some textual evidence that states that the Dutch purchased the island from the chief of Dakar or from local fisherman on the island. While there is little archaeological evidence of this transaction, all European deposits are relatively abundant. On Gorée there are four distinct deposits found through excavation and testing. The first kinds of deposition are located on the northwestern and western part of the island, and were typically three metres of domestic debris and shell midden. Surrounding the area that was once Fort Nassau, these depositions were determined in correlation with Fort Nassau activity, which was seen to be relatively unfluctuating.

A rare deposition was found near the Castel at G18, the sole site excavated in the area. Depositions in this area were typically shallow and right on top of a limestone bedrock. However, this one site produced three burials, all of which were dug into the limestone bedrock.

G13, a site located on the eastern side of the island, has produced cultural debris from one of its trash pits. This debris includes nails, European late pearlware and early whiteware with similar patterns dating from 1810 to 1849, sardine cans, and window glass, among other artifacts. Located near the military barracks from a military occupation in the nineteenth and early twentieth centuries, the analysis of these ceramics suggests that many of them were replacements coinciding with the occupation. Deposits like this were not common around the island.

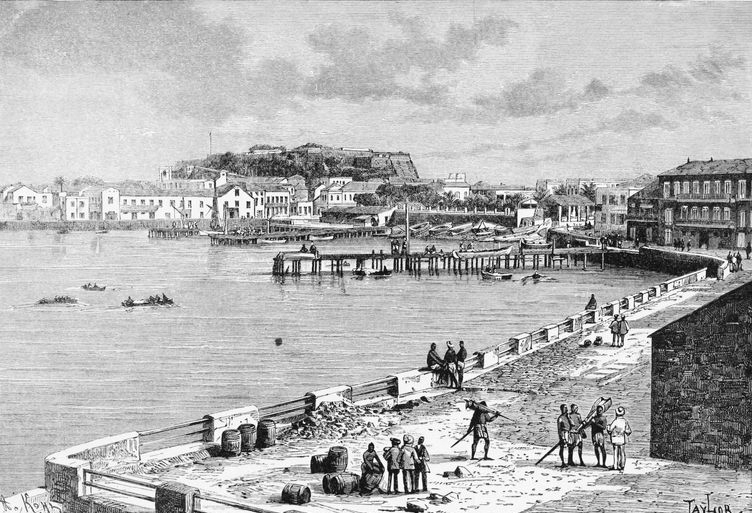
Artist representation of dock at Gorée in 1892

As with many archaeological sites around the globe, modern influences and activities affect the sites and lead to disturbances in the archaeological record or unintentional site destruction. The European government imposed strict rules regarding the use of space and overall settlement development on the island. Archaeology shows this development in the soil; the constructions, levelling, reconstructions, some of which can be linked to a change in the European ruler at the time. However, this evidence of development too show results of the consequences from contemporary activity, thus it is an intricate puzzle to determine complex social identities and groups, such as slave or free or African or Afro-European. An overall deduction can be made however: Atlantic trade significantly impacts the lives of those on Gorée, seen in the influx of ideas, complex identities and settlement structure.

Atlantic trade also influenced the physiological aspects of Gorean society. Archaeology has uncovered a plethora of evidence for massive imports of alcoholic beverages on the island. The massive import of alcoholic beverages naturally suggests a high level of consumption which its effects have been recorded as drunken conflicts, commonly between the military inhabitants. The previously mentioned Dr Ibrahima Thiaw is also the author of Digging on Contested Grounds: Archaeology and the Commemoration of Slavery on Gorée Island. In this article, Thiaw discusses the difference between the historical accounts full of slavery and shackles and the lack of archaeological evidence to support those accounts. Raina Croff, one of Thiaw's colleagues, states that she personally has never found any evidence of slavery on Gorée Island, however she also includes that archaeological evidence such as shackles and chains would not be found on an island, because there is no need.

==== Maison des Esclaves ====
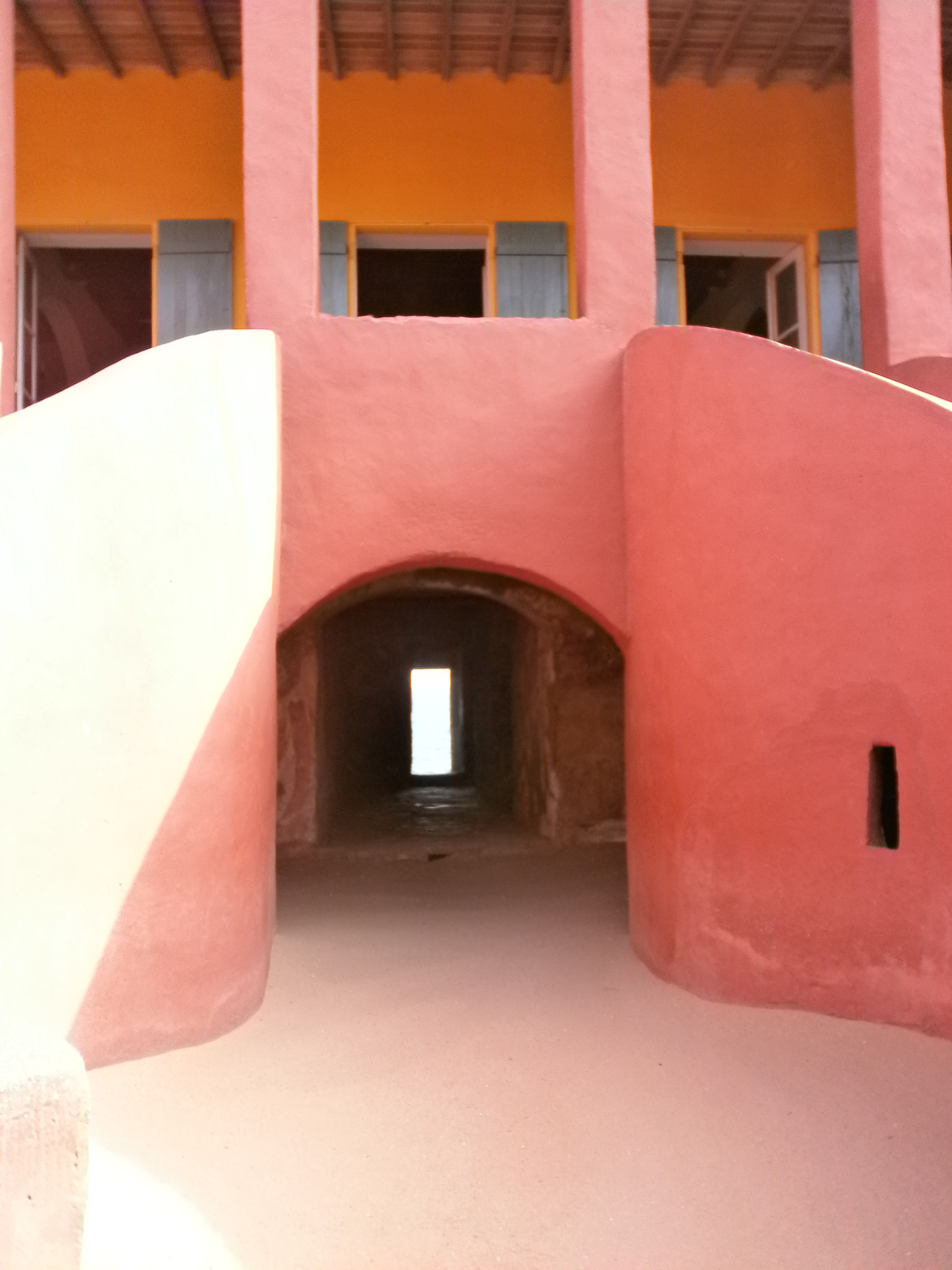
Door of No Return at Maison des Esclaves on Gorée Island

Maison des Esclaves, or the House of Slaves, was built in 1780–1784 by Nicolas Pépin. Although it is the home of the infamous "Door of No Return", which is said to be the last place exported slaves touched African soil for the rest of their lives, there is little evidence at Maison des Esclaves to suggest a "large-scale trans-Atlantic slave trade" economy. According to census records obtained from the 18th century, the majority of enslaved population fell under the category of domestic slaves, rather than slaves to be exported. Pépin and his heiress may have had domestic slaves, but again there is little archaeological evidence that they were involved in any slave exportation business. Despite this lack of evidence, Maison des Esclaves has become a pilgrimage site to commemorate forcible removal of Africans from their homeland, also known as the African diaspora. This contrasts with the role of the site of Rue des Dongeons on Gorée. At Rue des Dongeons, as the name suggests, there is a presence of dungeons, which can clearly be associated with the confinement of the slaves to be exported. Historian Ana Lucia Araujo has said "it’s not a real place from where real people left in the numbers they say." Conversely, UNESCO claims that "from the 15th to 19th century, Gorée was the largest slave trading centre on the African coast."

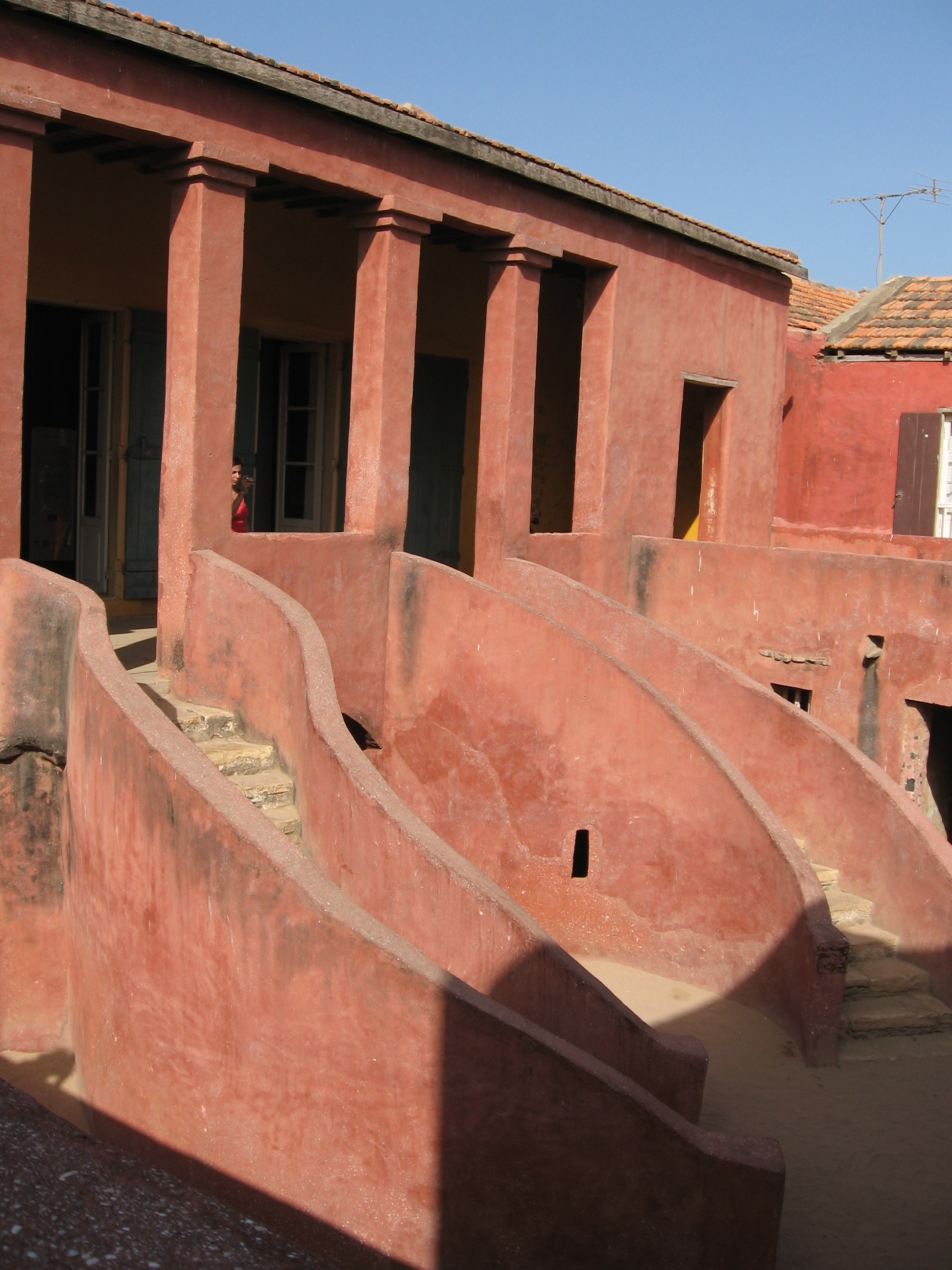
La Maison des Esclaves (House of Slaves). Gorée, Senegal.

==== Bambara Quartier ====
On the southcentral end of Gorée, in the Bambara quarter, although less abundant in artifacts, the deposits from this area differ in sediment inclusions from the rest of the island. Inclusions such as limestone, red bricks, shell, or stones in these two to three meter depositions are no older than the eighteenth century and shows frequent building up and tearing down processes. This could be correlated to the extensive settlement of this area maybe by domestic slaves beginning in the eighteenth century. Quartier Bambara was a segregated settlement, which suggests domestic slavery rather than exportation. The maps of this settlement has segregated boundary lines that eventually, by the mid-eighteenth century, were shown to be reduced. Found in the center of the island, Bambara was inhabited by the Bambara people. The Bambara people had an unfavorable stereotype; found in the mainland of Senegal and Mali, the Bambara were known for being excellent slaves. Brought to Gorée by the French, the Bambara people were set to build roads, forts and houses.

These buildings (Maison des Esclaves, Quartier Bambara, and Rue des Dungeons), made of stone or brick, contrasted with the structures built by the Africans made of straw and mud. This contrast aided in the segregation and status separation between the Africans and the European inhabitants and followed the common association that masonry was a European influence. However, the construction of these architectural buildings were most likely built by the slaves, and without floor plans, as indicated by the haphazard city layout and irregular angles in the rooms. Settlement analysis demonstrates the possibility that with time, the masters' and the enslaved peoples' statuses evened out enough to work and live side by side on the island by the second half of the eighteenth century.

== Disputing Gorée as a major trading post for slaves ==
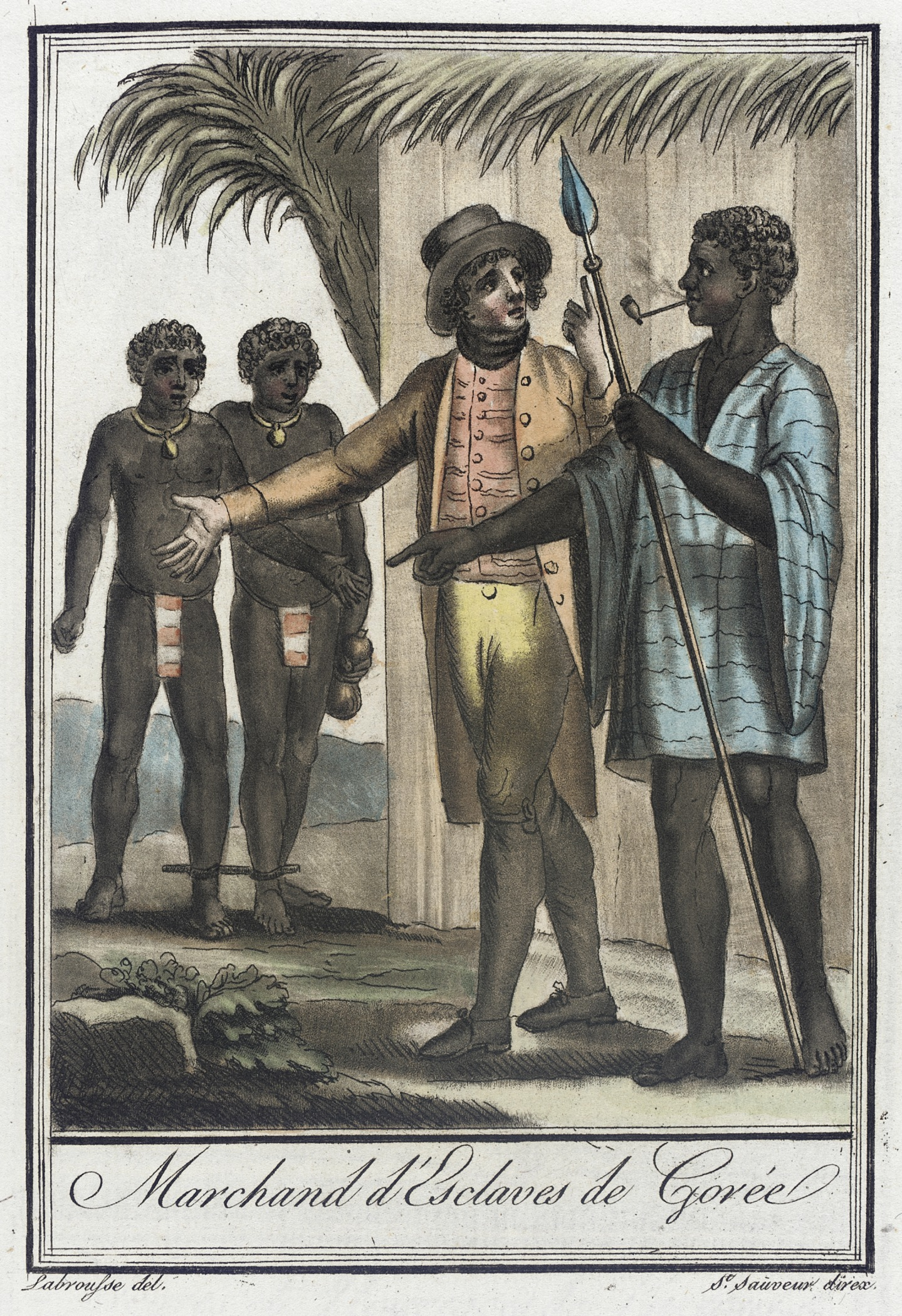
A slave trader of Gorée, engraving of c. 1797

In the 1990s a debate ensued on the veracity of the Gorée slave trade as narrated by the conservator Boubacar Joseph Ndiaye. In an article, published in the French newspaper Le Monde, Emmanuel de Roux challenged Ndiaye's repeated claims that Gorée, at the so-called "Maison des Esclaves", was an important slave depot (which was largely based on the false interpretations of French visitors in the 18–19th century and afterwards). De Roux based his critique on the works of the researchers Abdoulaye Camara and Father Joseph-Roger de Benoist. According to historical accounts, no more than 500 slaves per year were traded there, a trickle in comparison to the scale of the slave trade along the coasts of modern-day Benin, Guinee and Angola: in total 4–5% (or around 500,000) of the slaves were shipped from Senegal to the Americas, whereas the remaining 11.5 million enslaved Africans came from the other (West) African shores. Ndiaye's graphic descriptions of the conditions of the slaves allegedly kept at the "Maison des Esclaves" are not supported by any historical documentation and according to De Roux, they may have served to drum up business, especially from African-American tourists. In response to these accusations, several Senegalese and European researchers convened a symposium at the Sorbonne in April 1997, entitled "Gorée dans la traite atlantique: mythes et réalités", whose proceedings were published afterwards.

Recently, Hamady Bocoum et Bernard Toulier published an article "The Fabrication of Heritage: the case of Gorée (Senegal)" (in French: "La fabrication du Patrimoine: l’exemple de Gorée (Sénégal)") documenting the elevation of Gorée to an emotionally charged memorial of the transatlantic slave trade for touristic reasons. This was spearheaded by the Senegalese government, begun under President Léopold Sédar Senghor, who had tasked his special appointee Ndiaye with this goal. In 2013, journalist Jean Luc Angrand chronicled how Ndiaye began his lobbying campaign among African-American communities in the US, as he tried to capitalize on their desire to look for their own heritage in Africa that arose in the 1970s. This interest surged after the impact of the TV series Roots, which was most acutely felt among African-American viewers. For this reason Ndiaye exaggerated the importance of Senegal, and Gorée in particular, by claiming that no less than 20 million enslaved Africans were shipped from there.

Although several English-written media sources have reported on the invented history of Gorée, notably John Murphy in the Seattle Times and Max Fischer in the Washington Post, some English news sources, such as the BBC, still cling to the invented narrative of Gorée as a major center of the slave trade.

== Notable residents ==
- Latyr Sy, djembe musician
- France Gall, the French singer, owned a home there

== In popular culture ==
Gorée Island was the Pit Stop for Leg 4 of The Amazing Race 6, and the Slave House itself was visited during Leg 5.

Gorée Island has been featured in many songs, due to its history related to the slave trade. The following songs have significant references to Gorée Island:

- Steel Pulse– "Door of No Return" on African Holocaust (2004)
- Doug E. Fresh– "Africa"
- Akon – "Senegal"
- Burning Spear– "One Africa" on Jah Is Real (2008)
- Alpha Blondy & Solar System– "Goree (Senegal)" on Dieu (1994)
- Nuru Kane – "Goree"
- Sinsemilia - "De l’histoire"
- Gilberto Gil – "La Lune de Goree", composed by Gilberto Gil and José Carlos Capinam
- The father of the French rapper Booba (born Elie Yaffa) is from Gorée. In his song "Garde la pêche", he mentions the island, saying, "Gorée c'est ma terre" (Gorée is my land/hometown). In his song "0.9", he says, "À dix ans j'ai vu Gorée, depuis mes larmes sont eternelles" ("when I was ten, I saw Gorée. Since then, my tears have been eternal").
- Marcus Miller – "Gorée (Go-ray)"

In 2007, the Swiss director Pierre-Yves Borgeaud made a documentary called Retour à Gorée ("return to Gorée").

The Greek avantgarde classical composer Iannis Xenakis wrote a piece for harpsichord and ensemble entitled A l'ile de Gorée in 1986.

== Gallery ==
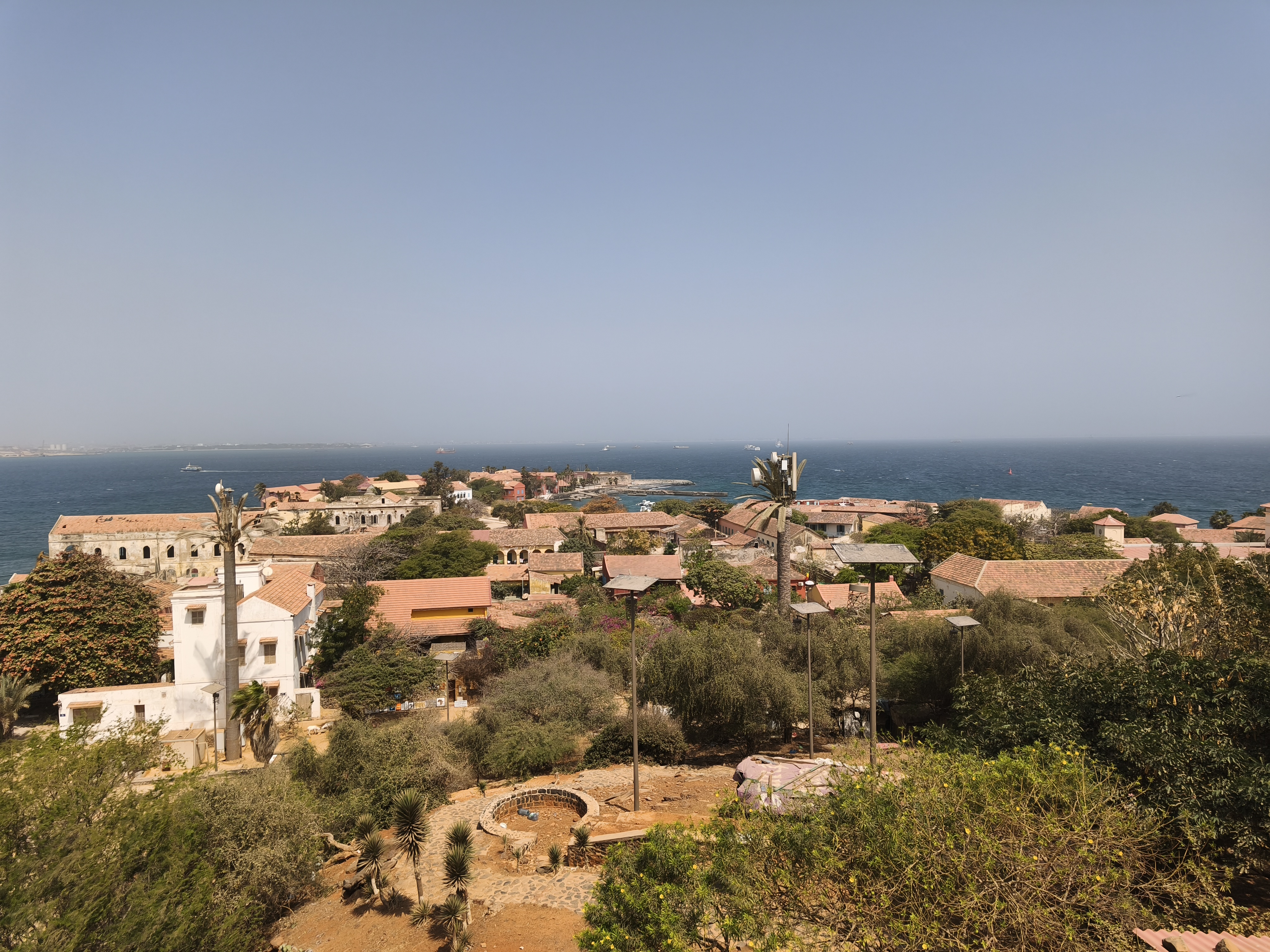
Harbor of Gorée

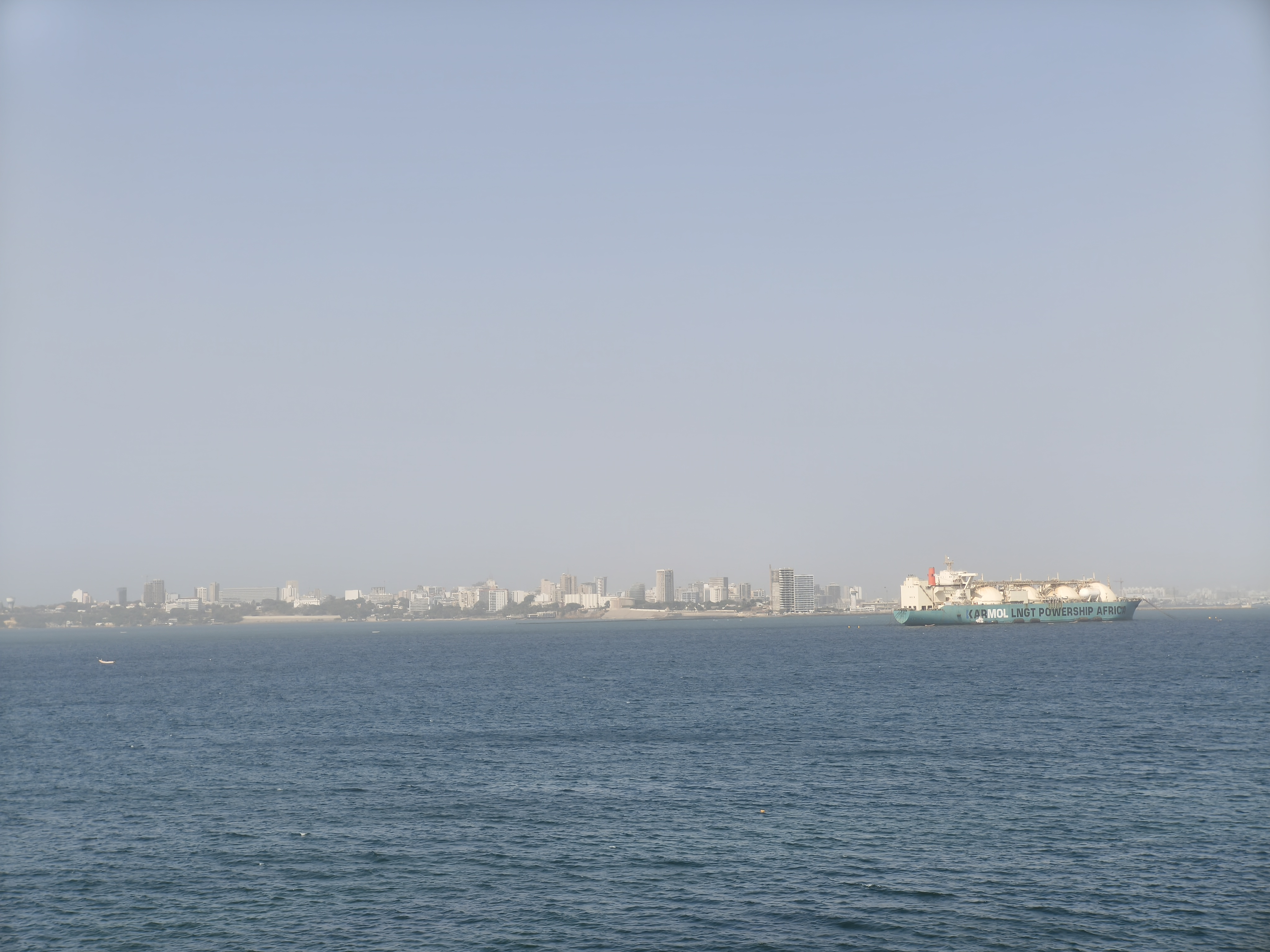
Dakar's skyline as seen from Gorée

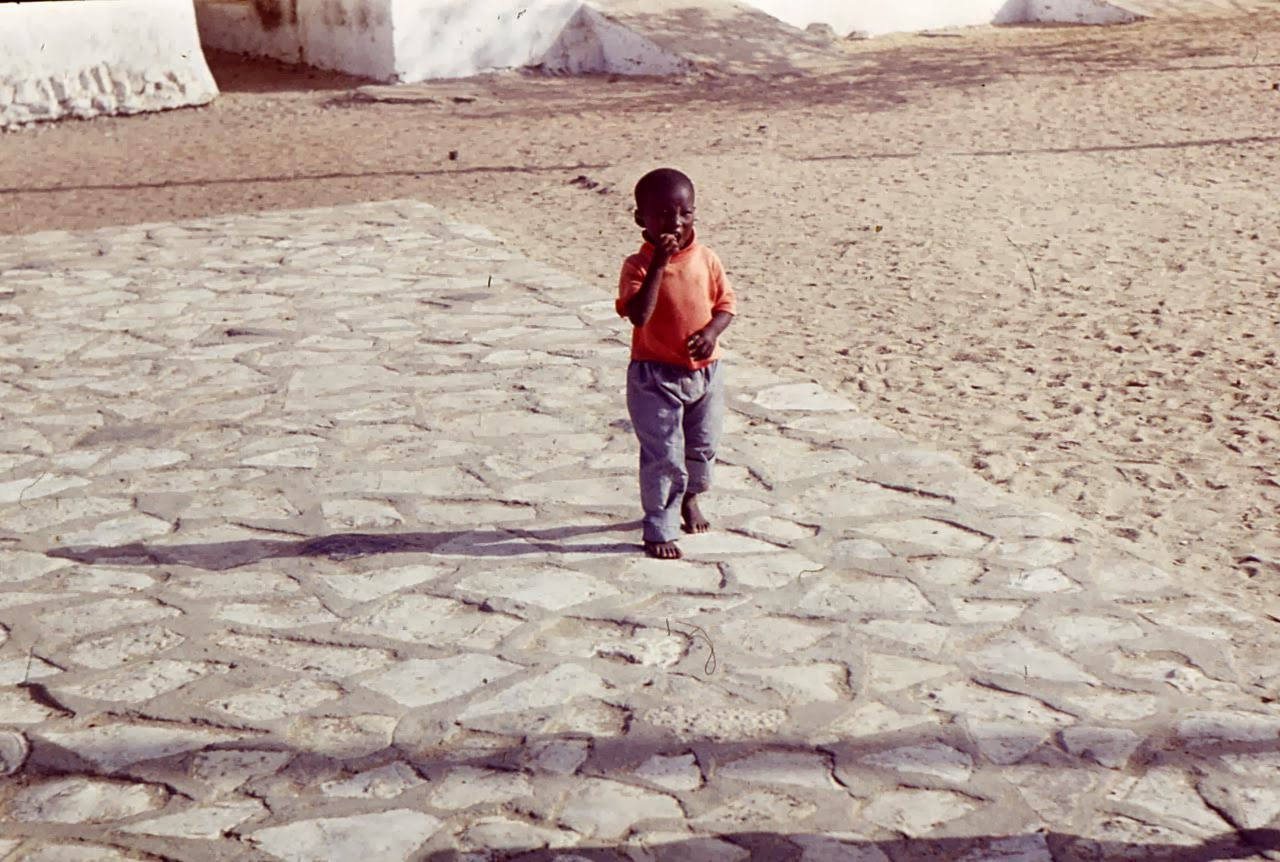
Senegalese boy on Gorée Island

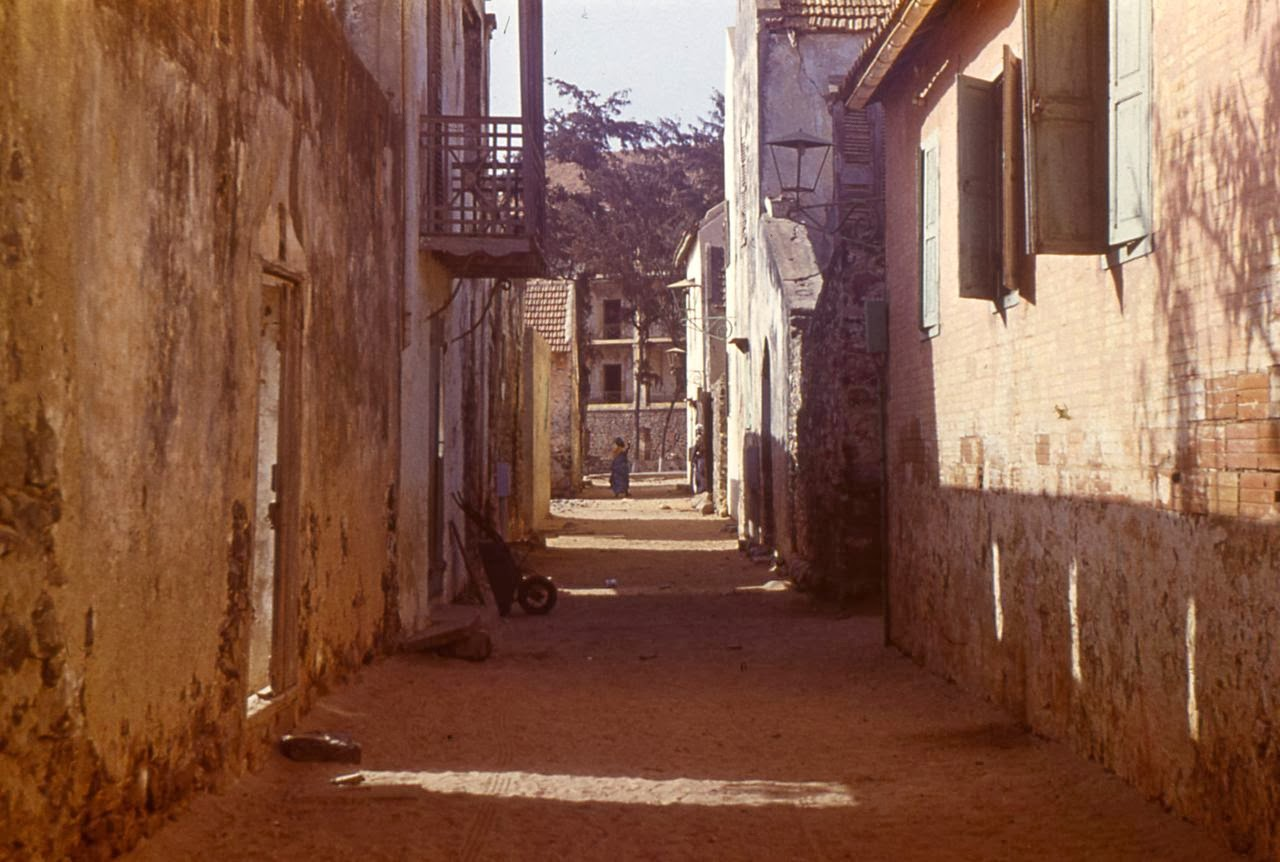
Street in Gorée

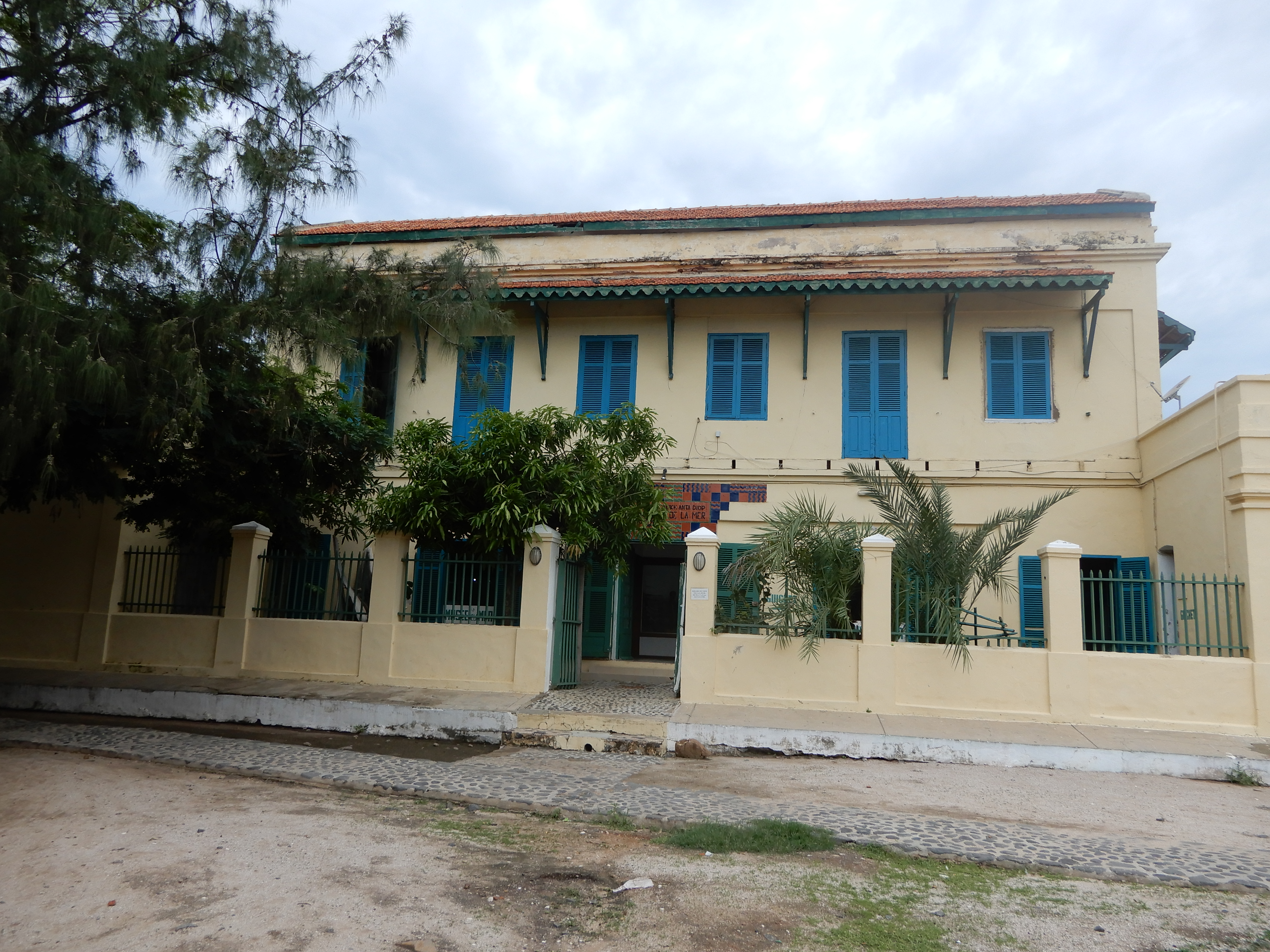

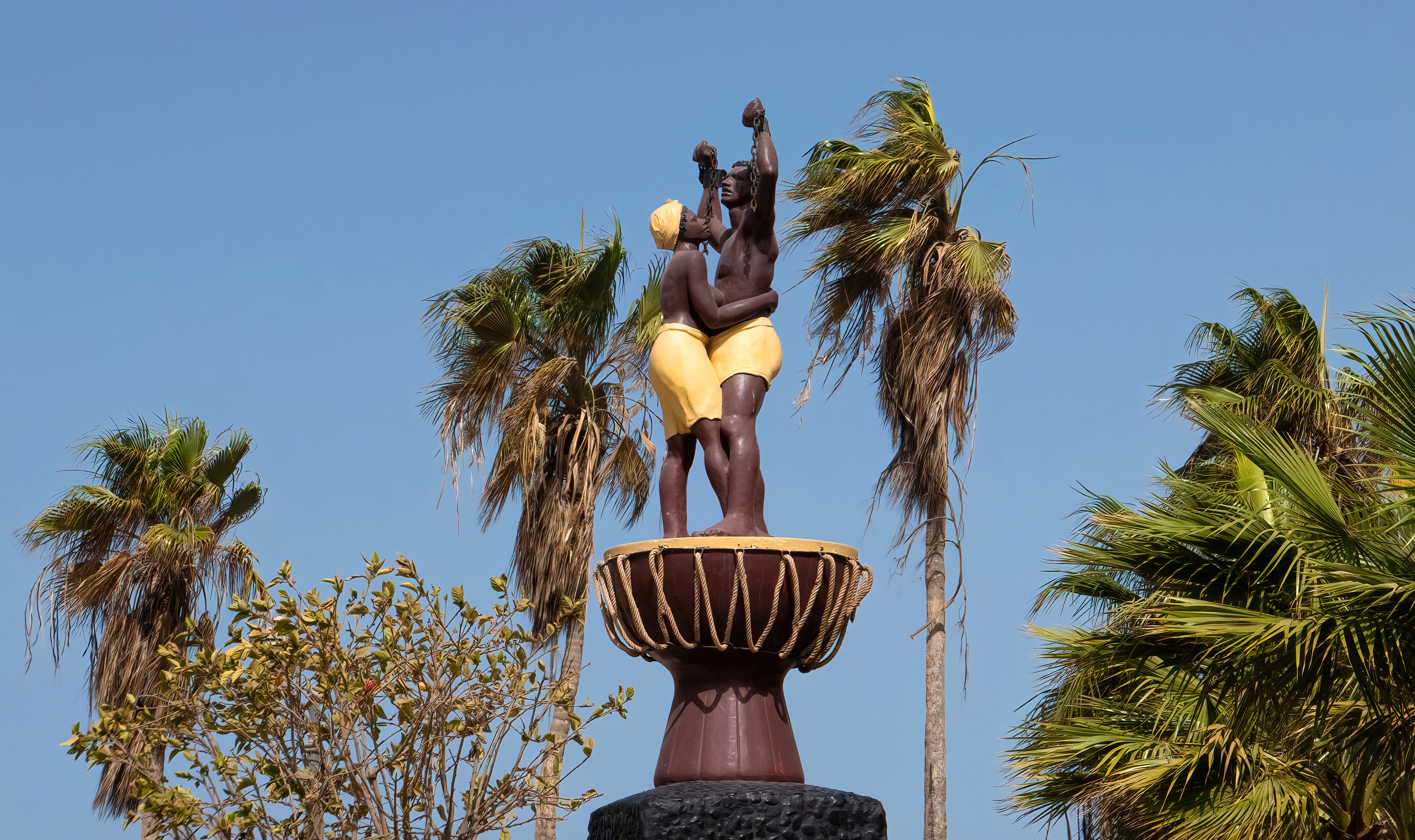
Memorial to slavery
