= Augustin Senghor =

Senegalese politician

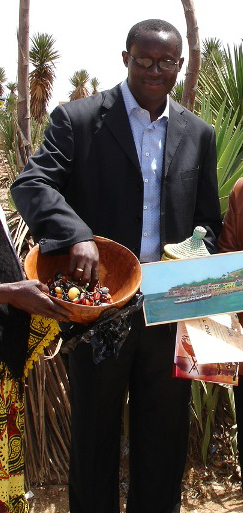
- Senghor in 2007
- Born: 21 November 1965 (age 59); Senegal

Augustin Senghor (born 21 November 1965) is a Senegalese politician. A member of the Rally of the Ecologists of Senegal, he became the mayor of Gorée in 2002, prominently featuring anti-erosion measures in his platform.

Senghor is also the president of the US Gorée football club. In 2009, he was elected as president of the Senegal Football Association. Senghor drew 174 votes, compared to 130 for runner-up El Hadji Malick Gackou, and 26 for third candidate Oumar Diop.
