= Historical Museum of Senegal in Gorée =

Coordinates: 14.670774°N 17.399603°W

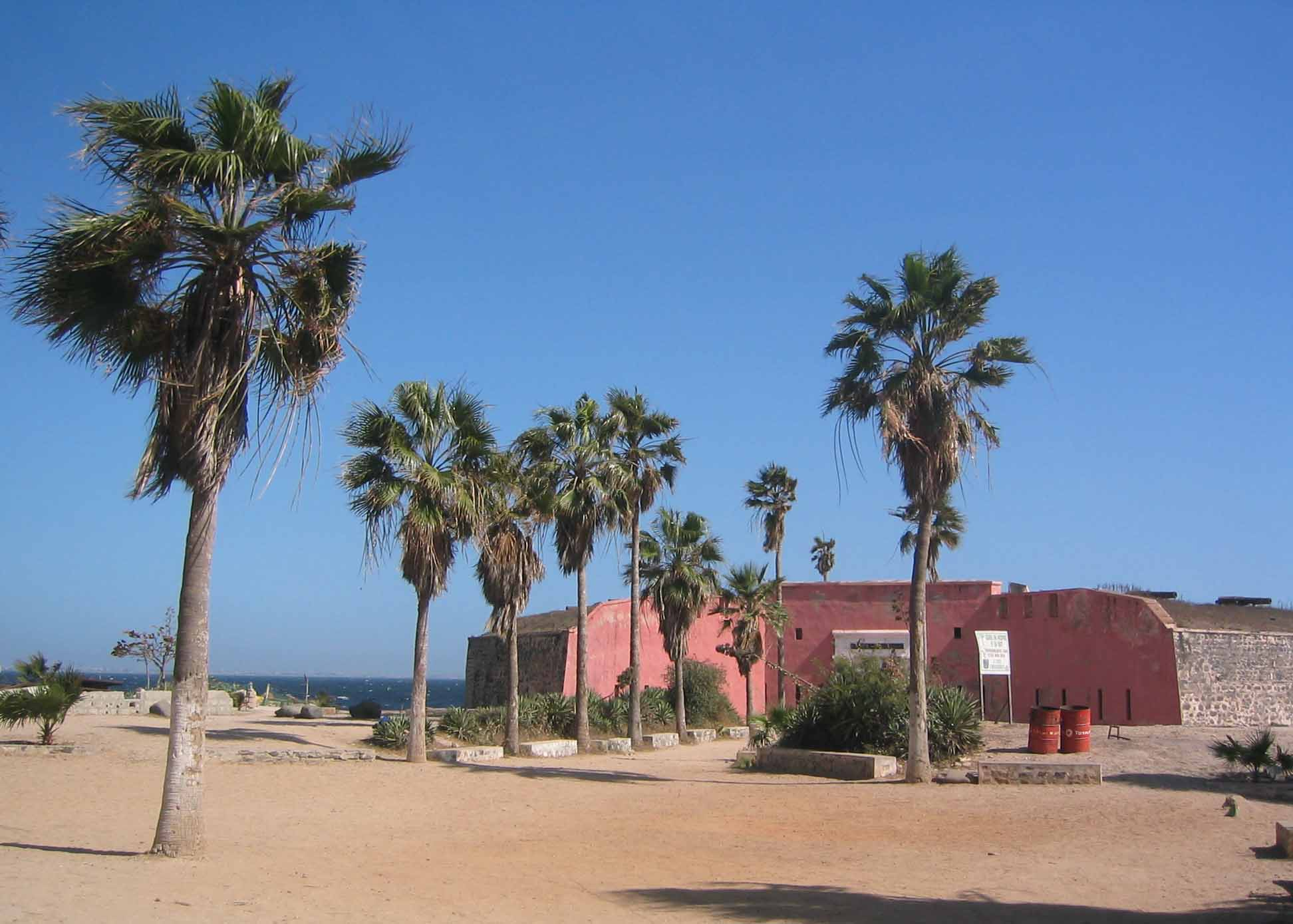
- Established: March 3, 1989; 36 years ago
- Location: Dakar, Senegal
- Type: Historical Museum
- Owner: Institut fondamental d'Afrique noire

The Historical Museum of Senegal in Gorée (French: Musée historique du Sénégal à Gorée) is a museum attached to the Institut fondamental d'Afrique noire (IFAN) and located on the island of Gorée, in the bay of Dakar, Senegal. The museum is dedicated to showing and commemorating the different stages of Senegal's history from ancient times to the country's independence.

== History ==
The fort was built between 1852 and 1856, the fortification has an area of 1900m^{2}, it was built for the purpose of defending the Dakar harbour. The fort is named in honor of vice-admiral Jean II d'Estrées, in which he regained control of the island from the Dutch in 1677. The person in charge of the construction of the fort was Emile Pinet-Laparde, he was one of the persons responsible for the French colonial administration of Dakar, in which he was sent to Senegal in 1849. After the Second World War, the fort became a prison and disciplinary center reserved for certain prisoners of the Dakar prison. In 1977, the government of Senegal closed the prison and handed over ownership of the building to the Institut fondamental d'Afrique noire. The work of renovation and transformation of the fort to create the museum was initiated by the Belgian anthropologist Guy Thilmans, these renovations took more than a decade. The renovation work was financed by public authorities and private funds, including the Ford Foundation, UNESCO in addition to the French and Saudi Arabian embassies. The decision to create the museum in the fort was due to the fact that the previous IFAN museum was too small, therefore, at the request of the director of the institute, Amar Samb, it was decided to establish a new museum there to replace the previous one, the restoration works were supervised by the Bureau d'Architecture des Monuments Historiques. On March 3, 1989, the renovations were completed and the museum was inaugurated. According to Abdouyale Ly, the first director of the museum, the objective with the opening of this museum is to promote the West African culture.

== Collections ==
In this fort is located the historical museum of Senegal, this museum contains various artifacts dating from the stone age on the history of the country. The museum is divided into 13 rooms, each of these rooms deals with a certain period in the history of Senegal, including a room for the Paleolithic period, the Neolithic period, colonization and independence, the museum also has collections about the different ethnic groups of the country. The museum has a room dedicated to Senegambian stone circles, a group of megalithic stones that are considered by UNESCO as a world heritage site. In the resistance room, there are exhibits of historical figures such as King Lat Jor. The museum contains documents on the history and religion of Senegal.

- Room 1: Cartography of Gorée Island
- Room 2: Paleolithic Period
- Room 3: Neolithic Period
- Room 4: Marine animals of the Senegal Coast
- Room 5: Hydrography of the Senegal River
- Room 6: Megaliths
- Room 7: Kingdoms and empires
- Room 8: Black Trade
- Room 9: Resistance
- Room 10: European Colonization
- Room 11: Islam (This room was rehabilitated with the help of the Islamic World Educational, Scientific and Cultural Organization in 2003)
- Room 12: Independence Period
- Room 13: Cannon Hall, handicrafts and fabrics

== Gallery ==
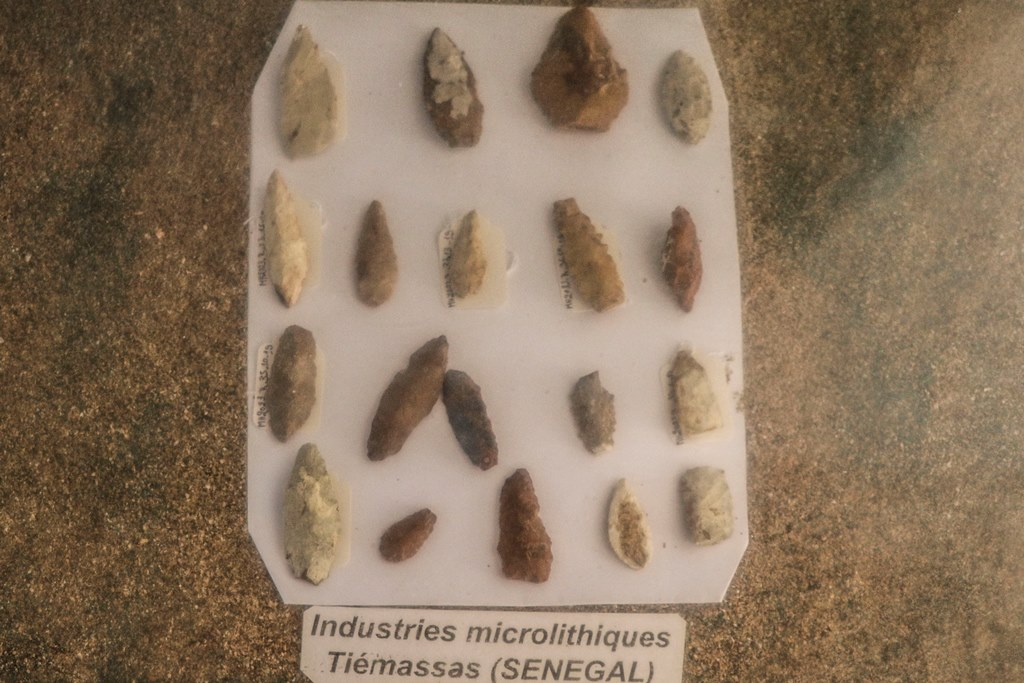
Upper Paleolithic flint tools of Tiemassas near Nianing.

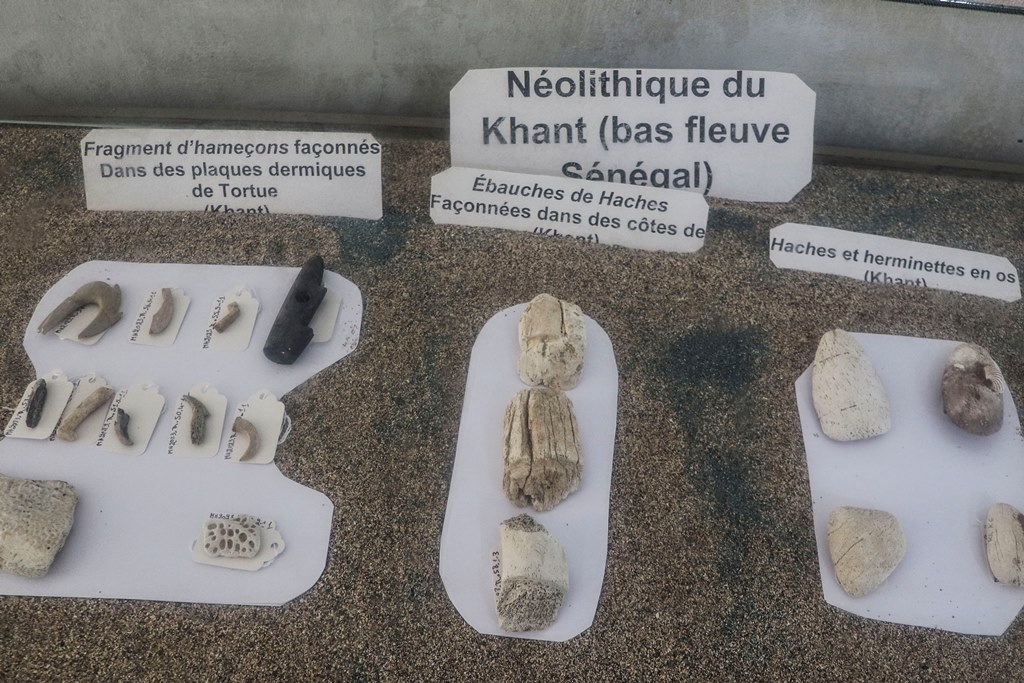
Neolithic flint tools from Khant near Kayar.

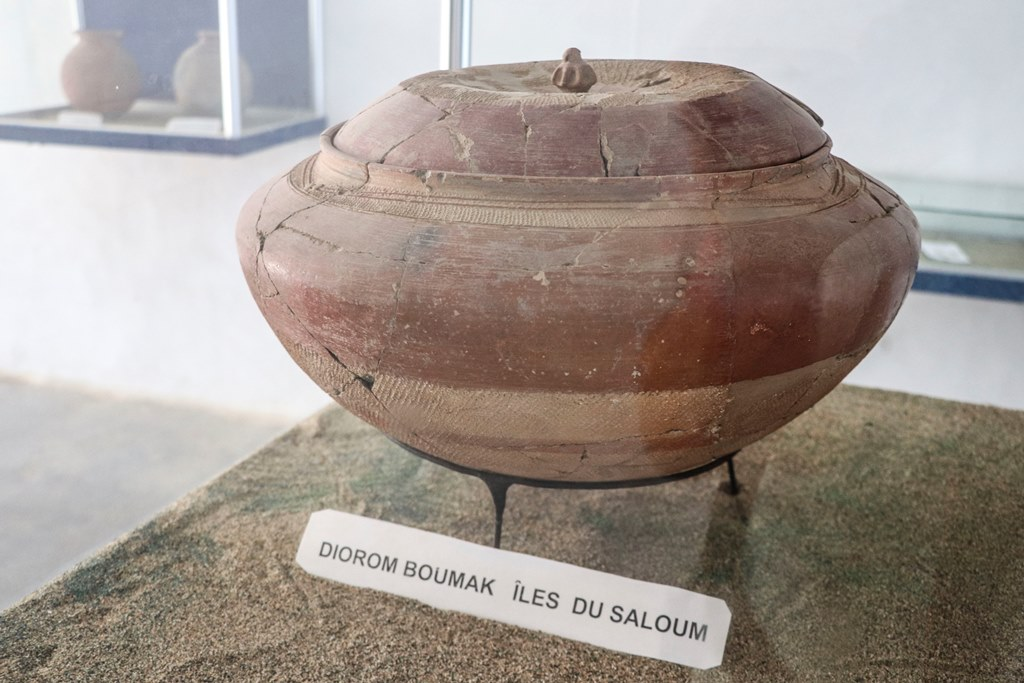
Pottery of the midden of Diorom Boumak in the Saloum Delta.

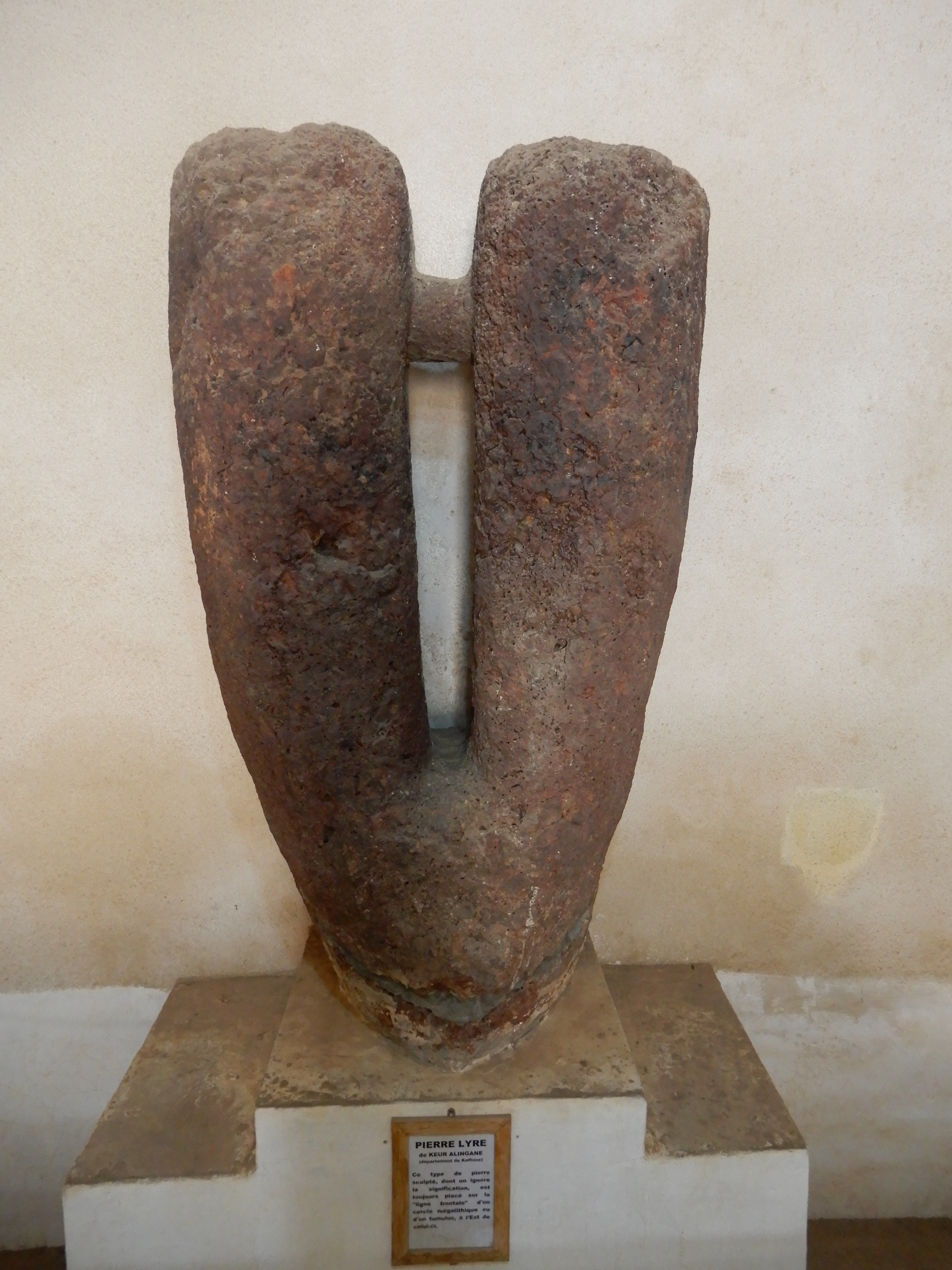
Lyre-shaped bifid Megalith with central tenon of Keur Alingane.

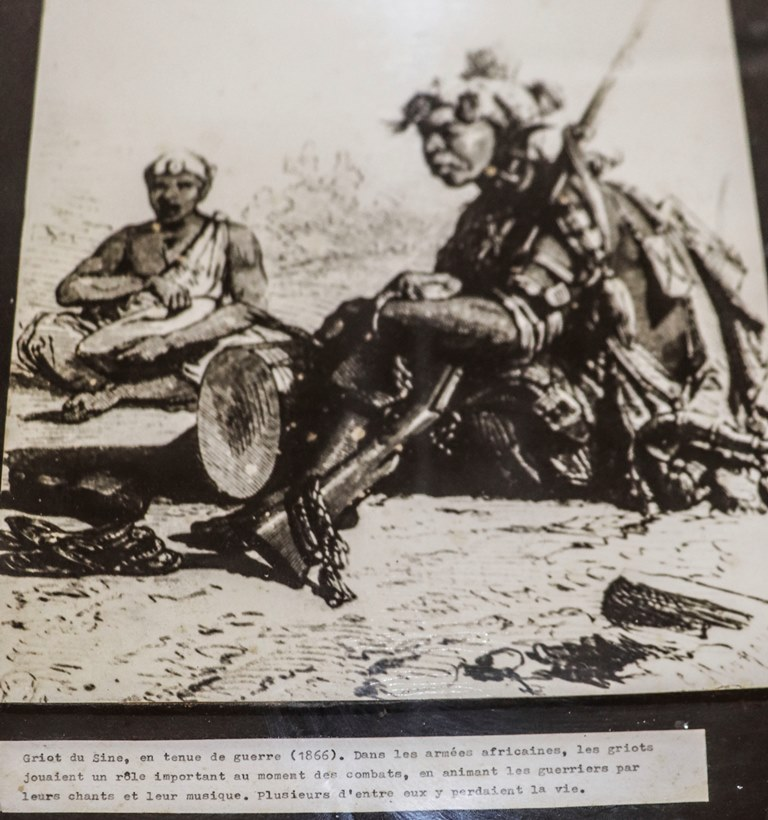
Photo of a griot in war dress (1866).
