= Senegalese Football Federation =

Governing body of football in Senegal

CAF
- Founded: 1960; 66 years ago
- Headquarters: Dakar
- FIFA affiliation: 1964
- CAF affiliation: 1963
- WAFU affiliation: 1975
- President: Augustin Senghor
- Vice-President: Saer Seck
- Website: fsfoot.sn

The Senegalese Football Federation (French: Fédération Sénégalaise de Football; FSF) is the governing body of football in Senegal. It is based in the capital of Senegal, Dakar, and was founded in 1960. The FSF aided in the development of football in Senegal, specifically for its professional and amateur leagues, youth and women's football, and academies. Currently the FSF oversees the professional leagues, run by the Ligue Sénégalaise de Football Professionnel (LSFP) and fully organises the national teams, youth, women's, and amateur football and all football administration.

== History ==
=== Pre-2000s ===
A former colony of France, football was introduced to Senegal by French soldiers who played to remain fit and healthy. Soon after, football spread and became an important aspect of Senegalese culture, and the FSF was established in 1960.

In 1964 the FSF was affiliated with FIFA (French: Fédération internationale de Football Association) and the Confederation of African Football (French: Confédération Africaine de Football) or CAF. Due to lacking such affiliations prior to this, the FSF was unable to send a team for the 1962 FIFA World Cup or 1957-1963 African Cup of Nations (AFCON).

In 1964, although the FSF fielded a team for the 1966 World Cup Qualifiers, it later withdrew along with all the remaining CAF Associations in protest against FIFA providing 1 World Cup place for 3 confederations (Africa, Asia and Oceania) through an inter-continental playoff. The CAF associations felt the continent had improved to a level deserving of a guaranteed place and were concerned with high costs associated with organising an overseas playoff. The CAF nations also opposed the possibility of facing South Africa, who had qualified with Asia, after being expelled from CAF for the Apartheid policy.

=== Post-2000s ===
In 2008 the Navétanes amateur neighbourhood football competition and its accompanying regulatory body, ONCAV (French: Orginisme national de coordination des activités des vacances) were affiliated with the FSF (thus with FIFA) for the first time since its inception in the 1950s. This follows a historical struggle for control between the independent teams and the FSF and Sports Ministry (MoS).

In 2008 following the Senegalese National Team's failure to qualify for the 2010 World Cup and AFCON, frustrated fans attacked the FSF headquarters in Dakar, destroying windows and torching a bus. Riots continued at the national stadium as fans erected burning barricades, damaging billboards and windows and engaged in violent clashes with Police.

Following such disappointing performances and other off field issues, complying with FIFA regulations the FSF was dissolved and replaced by a caretaker Normalisation Committee (French: Comité de normalisation). This body remained until the re-organisation of the FSF in 2009. In July 2011, player El Hadji Diouf was banned from all football related activities for 5 years, after alleging corruption across the African Footballing System. The FSF later rescinded the ban in 2012.

The Léopold Sédar Senghor Stadium in the Senegalese capital, Dakar

In December 2011 the national team's preparation for the 2012 AFCON was stalled, following a dispute between the FSF and MoS, over coach Amara Traore's contract. Traore's request for a salary increase was denied by the ministry, a decision which was subsequently challenged by the FSF. This led to a delay in the naming of the squad, the cancellation of two preparation matches and a complete breakdown in relations between the MoS and the FSF, as the two were also disputing funds associated with attending the competition. Eventually an agreement was struck and Traore led the team to the 2012 AFCON. However, Senegal who were seen as favourites, exited the competition with no wins. As a result, Traore was dismissed by the FSF executive committee, leading to a dispute with Traore, who sued for wrongful termination and outstanding salary, arguing no clause existed in his contract which allowed for the cancellation of the contract on the basis of performance. In April 2012 the FSF was ordered by the courts to pay Traore US$72,000 and when this was not paid the court ordered for the FSF's bank account to be frozen. Later the two parties came to an agreement to settle the matter privately.

In 2012 during qualifications for the 2013 AFCON, Senegal's second-leg match against Ivory Coast was terminated after 74 minutes, following a large group of Senegalese fans, unhappy with refereeing decisions, began to riot. They threw projectiles at the Ivorian players, lit fires and forced many Ivorian fans to flee the pitch. Consequently, Senegal was disqualified from AFCON 2013 and CAF banned matches at the Leopold Sedar Senghor Stadium for 1 year, also fining the FSF US$100,000.

In 2020 as a result of the COVID-19 pandemic, the FSF executive as advised by the federations Medical Committee voted to cancel the remainder of the 2019–20 season. As part of the move promotions and relegations were halted; although Teungueth and Jaraaf FC were designated to represent Senegal continentally next season. The FSF also announced it would provide a financial stimulus for struggling teams.

== Structure ==
The General Assembly elect a 23-person executive committee which administer and govern football in Senegal. Under the executive, the FSF has an emergency committee and various independent commissions. Politician, Augustin Senghor is the president of the FSF and lies on the next level of the hierarchy. Ex professional player Victor Cisse is the current General Secretary of the FSF. From here the FSF splits into two distinct operational areas. The Federal Administration covers the administrative elements of the FSF's activities, including; Arbitration, Marketing, Legal, Finance and Logistics departments. The National Technical Directory (DTN) focuses on the football side of the FSF, concerning; Management, training, youth, elite, national and women's football departments.

=== Election Process ===
The executive includes the President, elected by the General Assembly and 6 Vice-presidents who are selected as ex-officio members, a member since they hold a particular position (i.e. the president of the LSFP or the LFA amateur league). The remaining 16 members are also elected by the General Assembly but must belong to a specific FSF interest organisations. For example, three members represent the first division clubs, four represent regional leagues, five represent the LSFP and one represents women's football.

President	Augustin Senghor
Vice President	Saer Seck
General Secretary	Victor Cisse
Treasurer	Aboubacar Sy
Media Officer	Coumba Fall
Men's Coach	Aliou Cisse
Women's Coach	Sidate Sarr
Futsal Coordinator	Amadou Diop
Referee Coordinator	Mamadou N Diaye
Technical Director	Mayacine Mar

== Activities ==
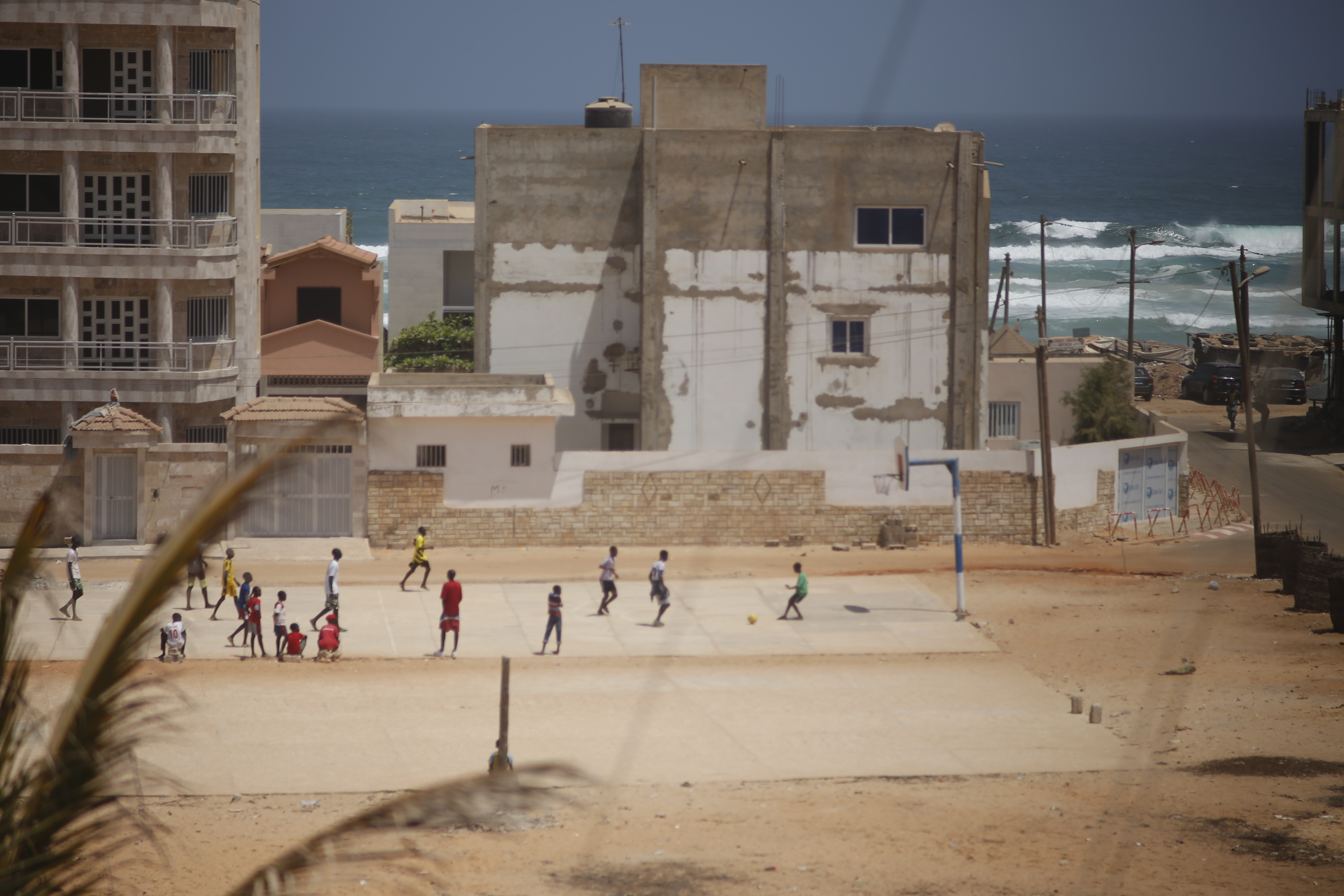
A local neighbourhood football match in Dakar

Following Senegalese Independence, the Senegalese Government employed a public and private system of sports. The FSF relies on subsidies from the Ministry of Sports (MoS) for many of its activities, including; competitions, training and national teams. The FSF oversees the majority of association-football activities through the DTN which is responsible for the technical development and promotion of Senegalese football through its various departments.

=== Navetanes ===
The FSF has extremely limited authority over the Navetanes neighbourhood amateur competition. Each team or 'Sports/Cultural Association' (ASC) are controlled by neighbourhood administrators, competing in local territorial tournaments. In 1970 the MoS organised ONCAV to oversee the competition and register each team as an ASC to instil some control and authority. In 1977 the ASC's gained control of ONCAV and became once again independent of the FSF and MoS. Eventually, in 2008, ONCAV and the Navetanes competition became affiliated with the FSF and therefore FIFA and the power struggle ceased, with the Navetanes remaining entirely independent from the control and reliance of the FSF. The FSF only regulates the ASC's if they choose to enter professional competitions or through its strong control's governing the ability for players to transition between FSF competitions and the Navetanes. i.e. players become ineligible for Navetanes after playing five professional matches.

=== Competitions ===
All competitive and amateur football is sanctioned by the FSF. First directly through its organisation of the Amateur Football League or LFA (French: Ligue du Football Am.) which consists of two leagues, Nationale 1 and Nationale 2. The leagues act as feeder competitions of the professional leagues, whereby the top 6 Nationale 1 teams enter a play-off replacing the bottom two Ligue 2 teams. The FSF also indirectly controls professional football through the LSFP, who operate the top 2 divisions, Ligue 1 and Ligue 2, as well as the League Cup. These leagues were developed by the interim Normalisation Committee in 2009, following advice from FIFA to professionalise Senegalese football. The LSFP although managing the leagues still operates under the authority of the FSF, as in 2020 when the FSF abandoned all leagues due to COVID-19. The FSF organises the Senegal FA Cup, established in 1961 and the Senegal Super Cup.

The FSF also governs youth football and its associated leagues, including the youth national teams. In 2011 the FSF created a parallel youth league to the professional league for junior clubs, aiming to restructure grassroots football in Senegal. The FSF is responsible for the transportation, funding, equipment organisation and operation of the competition.

=== Women's Football ===
The FSF solely manages female football in Senegal. The women's game in Senegal began with Elior Khouma who began to informally coach girls at his footballing school in Sicap-Liberté, Dakar. An Italian friend brought a team from Milan to play Khouma's women's team in a match that was supported by the FSF and the Municipal Government of Dakar, although they lost 5–2. In 1991 the team, 'The Gazelles' were invited to take part in the first African Championship for Women, but withdrew as the FSF refused to send a team. Prior to the 1990s the FSF played only a small role in women's football, although through the advocacy of Fancoise Seck and the development of a national team, the FSF began to sanction league play, championships and international friendlies. In 2000 following Seck's appointment to the head of women's football in 2000, the FSF further committed to women's football, establishing a national league with 12 teams, providing uniforms, paying coaches and transporting teams.

=== Academies ===
Most of Senegal's youth academies are privately owned and operated, falling outside of the governance of the FSF. Most academies are either controlled by local or foreign teams (or both), as well as unregistered academies. The MoS and FSF only regulate these academies by implementing a mandate, ensuring that the youth in academies are properly educated, with no other obligations to the FSF unless an academy team register's to play in FSF sanctioned competitions.

Although the Aldo Gentina Academy was founded by then president of the FSF, El Hadj Malick Sy as a collaboration between Senegalese Ligue 1 club ASC Jeanne d'Arc and AS Monaco of France.

The Diambars institute academy was developed by the vice-president of the FSF, Saer Seck, ex French professional player Patrick Vieira and Bernard Lerma in 2003. The institute provides both football and education development and was initially supported by the Nord-Pas-de-Calais region in France and the Senegalese Government.

=== Regulation & Administration ===
The status' of players including; registration, contract stability, protection of minors, training, compensation, solidarity mechanisms, wages, quotas and limitations are all organised and managed by the FSF. The FSF has established various regulations and codes, implementing the Statutes De La FSF, Codes de La FSF, Reglement Generaux de la FSF and Reglement de la CNRE.

The FSF and LSFP together oversee disciplinary proceedings, with the league operating its own disciplinary model and the association providing a means for appeals. The FSF also operates its own arbitration court.

== National teams ==
The Federation is responsible for organising the men's, women's and youth national football teams; appointing the management staff, funding, organising matches, sponsorships and other organisational matters.

=== Men's National Football Team ===
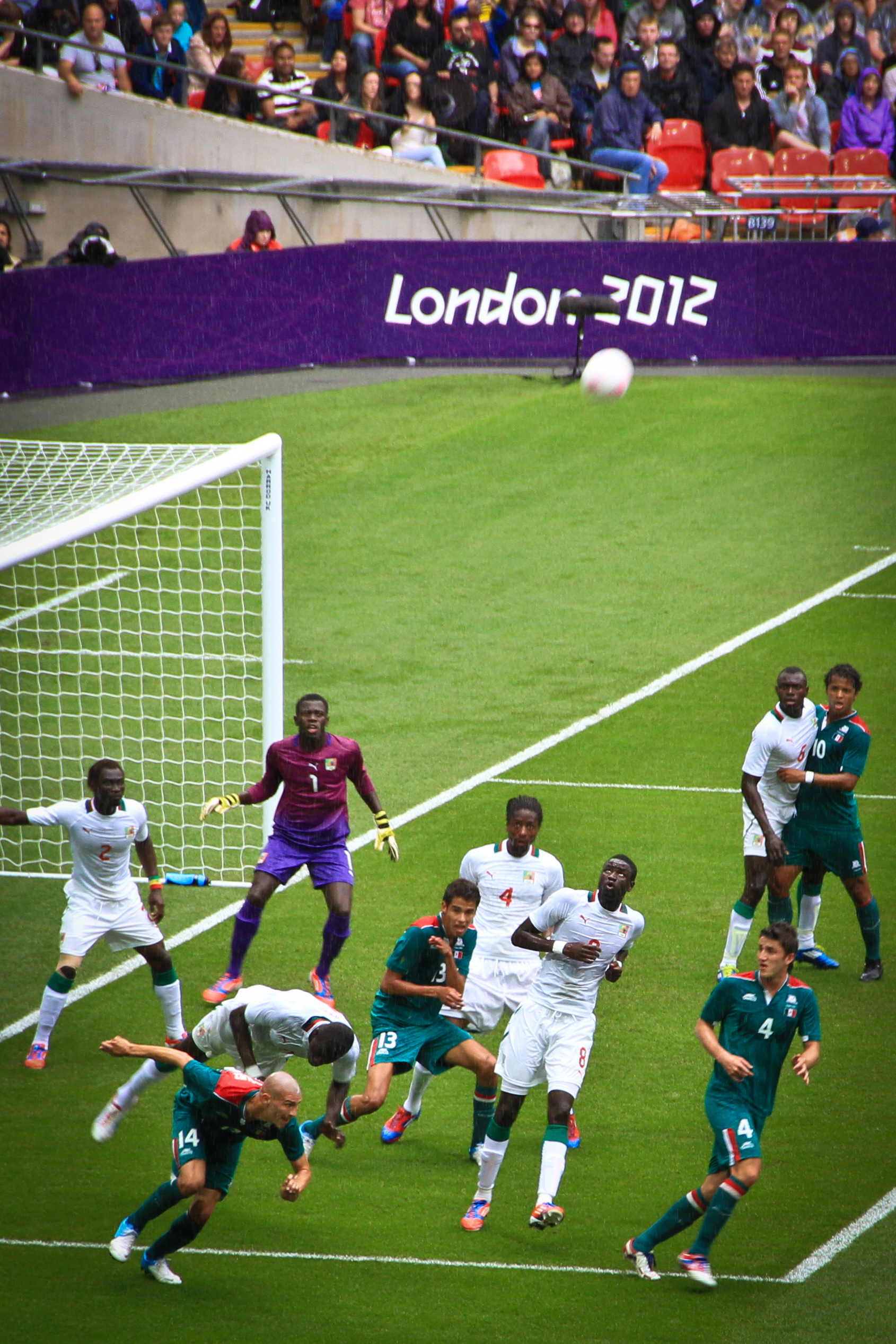
The Senegalese Olympic Football Team defend a cross against Mexico, in a quarter final at the 2012 London Olympics

The team, nicknamed The Lions of Teranga (French: Les Lions de la Teranga) are the highest ranked African national team. Established in the 1960s the team has seen success in West African competitions, have reached 2 AFCON finals, as well as the 2002 FIFA World Cup quarter final.

=== Local Selection A ===
The U23 national men's football team or 'Senegal Olympic' represents Senegal at the U23 level and at the Olympics. Most notably, the Cubs of Teranga (French: Lionceaux de la Teranga) reached the quarter-finals in the 2012 Olympics and 4th place at the CAF U23 Championship in 2011.

=== Women's National Football Team ===
Established in the late 1990s, the women's team only reached its first AFCON in 2012 where it exited in the group stages. The team has found some success in its West African Competitions.

=== Men's U20 Youth Team ===
The U20 Men's Youth Team is the feeder club for the senior team and represents Senegal at the U20 youth level. The team has qualified for 3 U20 World Cup Finals, reaching the semi-finals in 2015.

=== Men's U17 Youth Team ===
The team represents Senegal at U17 youth competitions, which made its first continental appearance at the 2011 U17 AFCON, and their first appearance at the U17 World Cup in 2019.

=== Men's National Beach Soccer Team ===
The Senegalese beach soccer team represents Senegal internationally in beach soccer, winning the Beach Soccer AFCON 5 times and is the highest ranked CAF team. The team has also become a consistent competitor in the FIFA Beach Soccer World Cup.

== Honours ==
=== National football teams ===
Men

- Africa Cup of Nations (AFCON)
  - Winners (1): 2021
  - Runners-up (2): 2002, 2019
- Amílcar Cabral Cup
  - Winners (8): 1979, 1980, 1983, 1984, 1985, 1986, 1991, 2001
  - Runners-up (5): 1982, 1993, 1997, 2000, 2005
- WAFU Nations Cup
  - Winners (1): 2019
  - Runners-up (2): 2010, 2013
- All African Games
  - Winners (1): 2015
  - Third place (1): 2019
- CEDEAO Cup
  - Winners (1): 1985
  - Runners-up (2): 1990, 1991
- UEMOA Tournament
  - Winners (3): 2009, 2011, 2016

Women

- WAFU Zone A Women's Cup
  - Winners (1): 2020

=== National youth teams ===
Men

- FIFA U-20 World Cup
  - Fourth place (1): 2015
- CAF U-23 Africa Cup of Nations
  - Fourth place (1): 2011
- U-20 Africa Cup of Nations (African Youth Championships)
  - Runners-up (3): 2015, 2017, 2019
- WAFU Nations Cup
  - Winners (1): 2015
- WAFU U-20 Championship
  - Winners (1): 2019
  - Runners-up (1): 2008
- WAFU Zone B U-20 Tournament
  - Winners (1): 2018

=== National beach soccer teams ===
Men

- Africa Beach Soccer Cup of Nations
  - Winners (5): 2008, 2011, 2013, 2016, 2018
  - Runners-up (2): 2007, 2015
  - Third place (1): 2009

=== Association awards ===
- Most Improved Squad: 2022 award
- FIFA Fair Play Award: 2019 FIFA Beach Soccer World Cup
- Fair Play Award: 2019 Africa Cup of Nations

== Hosting ==
- Africa Cup of Nations: 1992
- WAFU Nations Cup: 2015, 2019
- Amílcar Cabral Cup: 1986, 1991
- Africa U-20 Cup of Nations: 2015
- UEMOA Tournament: 2017

== Sponsors ==
Puma

Orange

== Trivia ==
In July 2018 CAF donated the Youssouffa Ndiaye Centre for Technical Excellence to the FSF to aid in its ability to develop and promote football.

Senegal is also a member of the West African Football Union (French: Union des Fédérations Quest-Africaines de Football) or WAFU, as part of Western Zone A, following its split into two zones by CAF.

The FSF is the only body in Senegal which can issue a club licence, allowing teams to compete professionally.
